= Solvent dye =

A solvent dye is a dye soluble in organic solvents. It is usually used as a solution in an organic solvent.

Solvent dyes are used to color organic solvents, hydrocarbon fuels, waxes, lubricants, plastics, and other hydrocarbon-based nonpolar materials. Fuel dyes are one use of solvent dyes. Their molecules are typically nonpolar or little polar, and they do not undergo ionization. They are insoluble in water. They form a colloidal solution in solvents. They have poor (basic dyes) to good (metal complex based) light fastness.

Solvent dyes are used for gold imitation (and other transparent metallic effects) of metallized polyester films. Also used in marking inks, inkjet inks, glass coloration, and so on.

Names of solvent dyes are often generic, of the scheme "solvent <color> <number>", e.g. Solvent Red 24, Solvent Red 26, Solvent Red 164, Solvent Yellow 124, Solvent Blue 35, etc.

Red and yellow solvent dyes are often azo dyes, green and blue ones tend to be anthraquinone dyes.
