= 2024 Taiwanese Sudan Red contamination incident =

Food safety incident in Taiwan

In 2024, a food safety scandal erupted in Taiwan after a citizen reported that a seasoning product from Chi-Sheng Co., Ltd. contained Sudan stains, a potentially carcinogenic dye. Local health authorities traced the source back to Po-Hsin Enterprise Co., Ltd. and a network of trading companies established by businessman Lee Yen-Ting. Further investigation revealed that Po-Hsin had distributed Sudan Red stain-tainted chili powder to multiple downstream manufacturers, affecting a wide range of products across Taiwan. Both Po-Hsin and Lee were indicted by the New Taipei District Prosecutors Office and the Kaohsiung District Prosecutors Office, respectively. Chi-Sheng was also fined for falsifying inspection records.

== Background ==
Sudan Red refers to a group of synthetic chemical dyes (such as Sudan I, II, III, and IV) that are commonly used for coloring plastics and industrial products. They are banned for use in food due to their potential carcinogenicity. In the 2024 Taiwan contamination incident, Sudan Red compounds were illegally added to food products, prompting widespread public concern and recalls.

== Origin ==
Since 2018, Taiwanese businessman Lee Yen-Ting established ten companies in Taiwan under the names of relatives and friends, divided into trading firms (Jinzhan, Zhanjie, Jia-Guang, Guang-Yuan, Busan), manufacturing (Hai-Shun), and e-commerce sales (Chu Yi Shi Wu). Meanwhile, he also founded Longhai Tongji Food Company in China, where he purchased and processed adulterated chili powder from rural areas. These 11 companies were found to contain Sudan stain as early as 2018. To evade further detection, Lee shifted imports under the name of a shell company registered in Hong Kong. These tainted ingredients were sold to Po-Hsin Enterprise, which then supplied Chi-Sheng Co., Ltd.

In early 2024, a citizen reported that a household four-in-one seasoning set produced at Chi-Sheng's Douliu Factory contained Sudan stain in the fine chili powder. Taiwan's Food and Drug Administration (FDA) and local health departments launched a joint investigation, which traced the source to chili powder imported by Po-Hsin from Sanhe Pharmaceutical Co., Ltd. (三禾藥業有限公司) in Henan Province, China. The contaminated powder had already been distributed to many downstream companies and processed into various products, including snacks such as Hsia Wei Hsien (蝦味先) and pork jerky.

=== Development ===
On February 19, 2024, the Kaohsiung City Department of Health was notified by the Yunlin County Department of Health that chili powder produced by Chi-Sheng's Douliu Factory tested positive for Sudan stain III. The tainted powder had been distributed to multiple jurisdictions, including Taipei City, New Taipei City, Taoyuan, Taichung, Tainan, Yunlin, Yilan, Pingtung, and Kaohsiung. In Kaohsiung, it was delivered to Yu-Rong Foods Co., Ltd. (裕榮食品股份有限公司) and used to produce the spicy flavor of Hsia Wei Hsien snacks. Although the tainted raw materials were no longer present at the factory, the health authority ordered a recall of all affected products.

Further tests revealed that several of Lee's associated companies—such as Jin-Chan, Jia-Guang, and Hai-Shun—had imported Sudan stain-tainted chili powder. The Kaohsiung health department discovered extensive regulatory violations among these 11 affiliated companies and announced the revocation of their business licenses on March 11. Meanwhile, the Tainan City Department of Health detected contaminated chili powder at Great Agar-Agar Enterprise Co., Ltd., and local authorities continued supervising product recalls.

As of March 19, 2024, the FDA reported a total of 537,238.2 kilograms of tainted chili powder and its derivatives had been recalled or seized across Taiwan.

=== Impact ===
According to Kaohsiung health authorities, 8 kilograms of Sudan stain-tainted chili powder from Chi-Sheng's Douliu Factory had been used to produce Hsia Wei Hsien snacks at Yu-Rong Foods. Between January and early February 2024, a total of 31,208.65 kilograms of the spicy-flavored snack—packaged into 60g, 80g, 115g, and 300g sizes, totaling 366,841 units—were manufactured. Over 1300 units remained in storage, while the rest had already entered retail distribution. Authorities ordered an immediate nationwide recall.

In March 2024, fast food chain TKK Fried Chicken announced that, although their suppliers’ inspection reports showed no Sudan dye contamination, they would voluntarily suspend the use of pepper, chili powder, and Sichuan pepper powder until their own third-party tests confirmed safety.

=== Legal Actions ===
During the investigation by the Kaohsiung District Prosecutors Office, Lee Yen-Ting divorced his wife, Wu Kemin, and concealed NT$20 million in cash at her residence. He also transferred funds, relocated assets, and registered a Porsche under the name of a female physician friend. Prosecutors confiscated over NT$130 million in Lee's assets, and the health department fined him NT$81.72 million. Prosecutors estimated Lee had profited NT$40 million over five years from selling Sudan stain-tainted chili powder and requested the court to impose a NT$1.2 billion fine. On May 9, the Kaohsiung District Prosecutors Office formally indicted Lee and sought a heavy sentence.

On April 29, the New Taipei District Prosecutors Office indicted Po-Hsin Co. and its representative, Liu Ching-Shih (劉慶士).

On February 26, the Yunlin District Prosecutors Office confirmed that Chi-Sheng had previously sent chili powder samples to SGS for testing, which returned positive for Sudan stain. However, the company forged reports showing a clean result. Prosecutors requested the detention of Chi-Sheng's R&D staff and released company executives on bail. As of May 8, the Taipei City Department of Health had fined Chi-Sheng NT$3.44 million in total.

=== Reactions ===
In March 2024, Hsu Fu (許輔), director of the Executive Yuan Food Safety Office, stated that Sudan stain is classified as a Group 3 carcinogen, the same as coffee and tea, and urged the public not to panic. His remarks were criticized by physician Su Yi-Feng, who pointed out that the Group 3 classification results from insufficient human data and should not be equated with everyday substances like coffee or tea. Hsu later apologized for the lack of clarity in his explanation.
