= 2-Naphthol =

- Skeletal formula

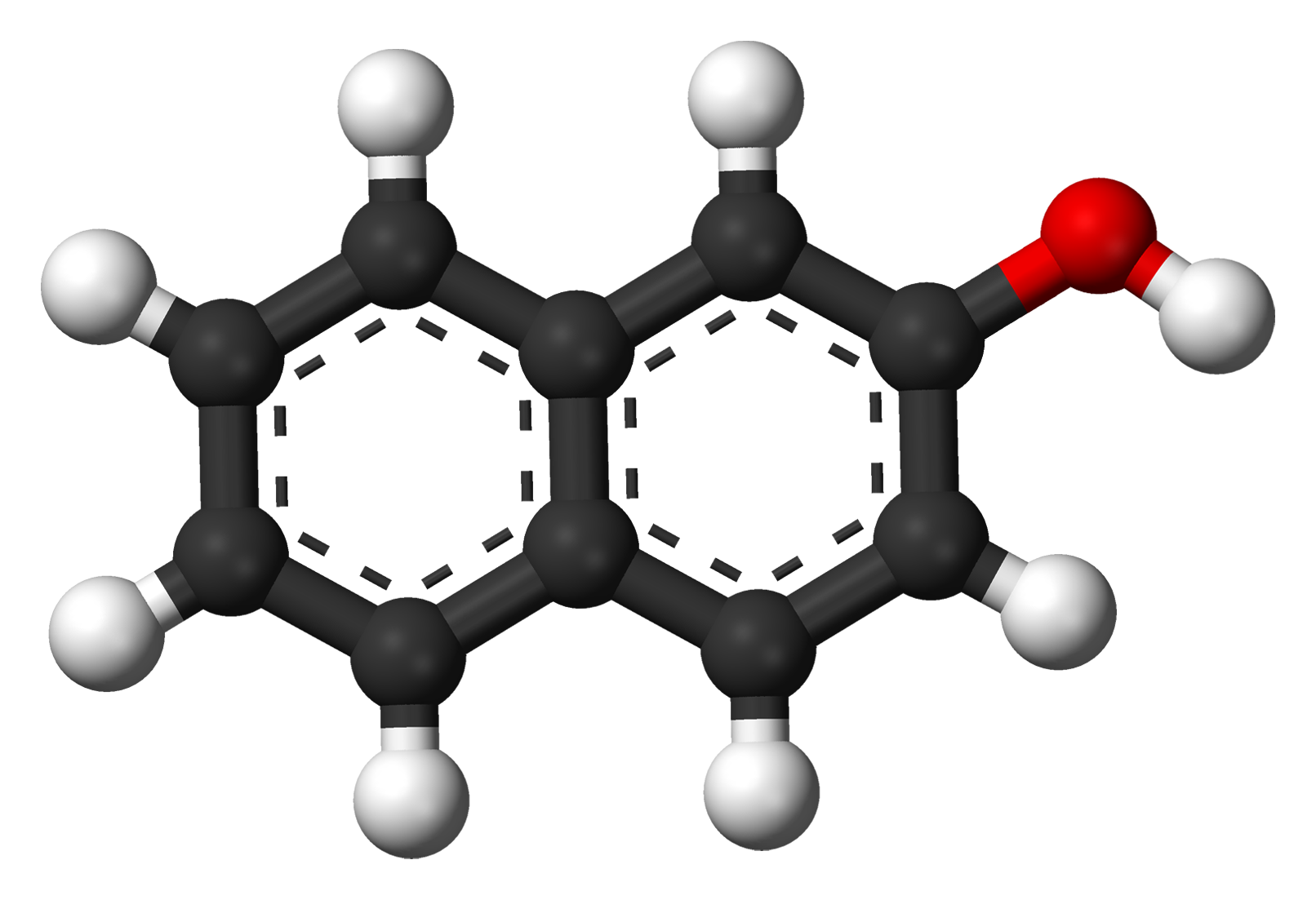

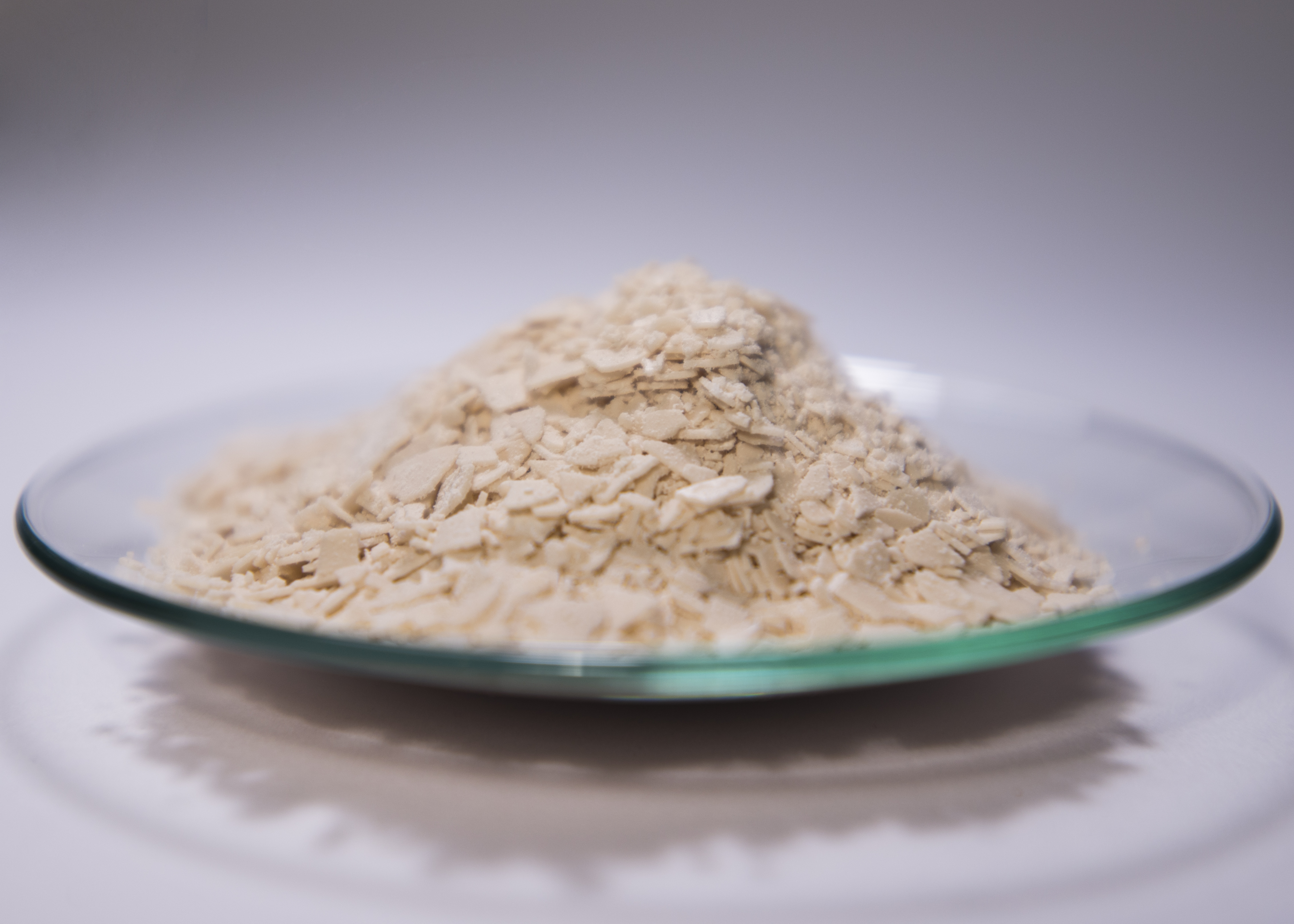

Names
- Preferred IUPAC name Naphthalen-2-ol
- Other names 2-Hydroxynaphthalene; 2-Naphthalenol; beta-Naphthol; Naphth-2-ol

Identifiers
CAS Number	135-19-3
3D model (JSmol)	Interactive image; Interactive image
Beilstein Reference	742134
ChEBI	CHEBI:10432
ChEMBL	ChEMBL14126
ChemSpider	8341
ECHA InfoCard	100.004.712
EC Number	205-182-7
Gmelin Reference	27395
KEGG	C11713
PubChem CID	8663
RTECS number	QL2975000
UNII	P2Z71CIK5H
UN number	3077
CompTox Dashboard (EPA)	DTXSID5027061
- InChI: InChI=1S/C10H8O/c11-10-6-5-8-3-1-2-4-9(8)7-10/h1-7,11H Key: JWAZRIHNYRIHIV-UHFFFAOYSA-N; InChI=1/C10H8O/c11-10-6-5-8-3-1-2-4-9(8)7-10/h1-7,11H Key: JWAZRIHNYRIHIV-UHFFFAOYAV
- SMILES: Oc2ccc1c(cccc1)c2; c1ccc2cc(ccc2c1)O

Properties
Chemical formula	C_{10}H_{8}O
Molar mass	144.173 g·mol^{−1}
Appearance	Colorless crystalline solid
Density	1.280 g/cm^{3}
Melting point	121 to 123 °C (250 to 253 °F; 394 to 396 K)
Boiling point	285 °C (545 °F; 558 K)
Solubility in water	0.74 g/L
Acidity (pK_{a})	9.51
Magnetic susceptibility (χ)	−98.25·10^{−6} cm^{3}/mol

Hazards
- Occupational safety and health (OHS/OSH)
Main hazards	Harmful when inhaled or swallowed; dangerous to environment, esp. aquatic organisms.
- GHS labelling
Pictograms	(GHS07: Exclamation mark) (GHS09: Environmental hazard)
Signal word	Warning
Hazard statements	H302, H332, H400
Precautionary statements	P261, P264, P270, P271, P273, P301+P312, P304+P312, P304+P340, P312, P330, P391, P501
NFPA 704 (fire diamond)	2 1 0
Flash point	161 °C (322 °F; 434 K)

Related compounds
Related compounds	1-Naphthol
- Except where otherwise noted, data are given for materials in their standard state (at 25 °C [77 °F], 100 kPa). verify (what is ?) Infobox references

2-Naphthol, or β-naphthol, is a fluorescent colorless (or occasionally yellow) crystalline solid with the formula C_{10}H_{7}OH. It is an isomer of 1-naphthol, differing by the location of the hydroxyl group on the naphthalene ring. The naphthols are naphthalene homologues of phenol, but more reactive. Both isomers are soluble in simple alcohols, ethers, and chloroform. 2-Naphthol is a widely used intermediate for the production of dyes and other compounds.

== Production ==
Traditionally, 2-naphthol is produced by a two-step process that begins with the sulfonation of naphthalene in sulfuric acid:

C_{10}H_{8} + H_{2}SO_{4} → C_{10}H_{7}SO_{3}H + H_{2}O

The sulfonic acid group is then cleaved in molten sodium hydroxide:

C_{10}H_{7}(SO_{3}H) + 3 NaOH → C_{10}H_{7}ONa + Na_{2}SO_{3} + 2 H_{2}O

Neutralization of the product with acid gives 2-naphthol.

2-Naphthol can also be produced by a method analogous to the cumene process.

== 2-Naphthol-derived dyes ==
The Sudan dyes are popular dyes noted for being soluble in organic solvents. Several of the Sudan dyes are derived from 2-naphthol by coupling with diazonium salts. Sudan dyes I–IV and Sudan Red G consist of arylazo-substituted naphthols.

Selected 2-Naphthol-derived dyes

Sudan I

Sudan II

Sudan III

Sudan IV

Oil Red O

Naphthol AS

== Reactions ==
Some reactions of 2-naphthol are explicable with reference to its tautomerism, which produces a small amount of the keto tautomer.

Tautomeric equilibrium for beta-naphthol

One consequence of this tautomerism is the Bucherer reaction, the ammonolysis of 2-naphthol to give 2-aminonaphthalene.

2-Naphthol can be oxidatively coupled to form BINOL, a C_{2}-symmetric ligand popularized for use in asymmetric catalysis.

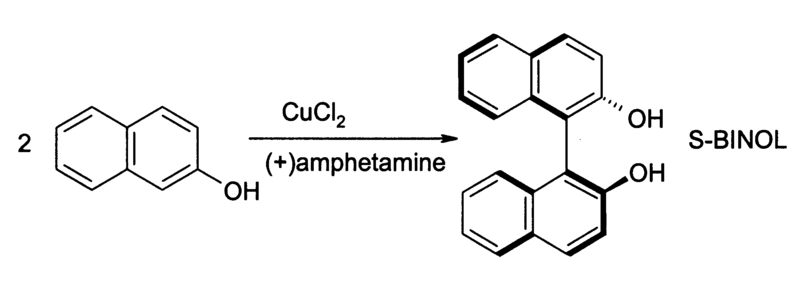
Coupling of beta-naphthol using CuCl2

2-Naphthol converts to 2-naphthalenethiol by reaction with dimethylthiocarbamoyl chloride via the Newman–Kwart rearrangement. The OH→Br conversion has been described.

2-Bromonaphthalene is prepared by treatment of naphthol with phosphorus bromide:

C_{10}H_{7}(OH) + (C_{6}H_{5})_{3}PBr_{2} → C_{10}H_{7}Br + (C_{6}H_{5})_{3}PO + HBr

Electrophilic attack occurs characteristically at the 1-position as indicated by nitrosylation to give 1-nitroso-2-naphthol. Bromination and alkylations proceed with similar regiochemistry. Ring-opening reactions have been documented.

Carbonation of 2-naphthol gives 2-hydroxy-1-naphthoic acid.

== Safety ==
2-Naphthol has been described as "moderately toxic".
