= Fecal fat test =

Medical diagnostic test

In medicine, the fecal fat test is a diagnostic test for fat malabsorption conditions, which lead to excess fat in the feces (steatorrhea).

== Background ==
In the duodenum, dietary fat (primarily triglycerides) is digested by enzymes such as pancreatic lipase into smaller molecules of 1,2-Diacylglycerols and free fatty acids, which can be absorbed through the wall of the jejenum of the small intestine and enter circulation for metabolism and storage. Since fat is a valuable nutrient, human feces normally contains very little undigested fat. However, a number of diseases of the pancreas and gastrointestinal tract are characterized by fat malabsorption.

Examples of such diseases are:

- disorders of exocrine pancreatic function, such as chronic pancreatitis, cystic fibrosis and Shwachman–Diamond syndrome (these are characterized by deficiency of pancreatic digestive enzymes)
- celiac disease (in which the fat malabsorption in severe cases is due to inflammatory damage to the integrity of the intestinal lining)
- short bowel syndrome (in which much of the small intestine has had to be surgically removed and the remaining portion cannot completely absorb all of the fat).
- small bowel bacterial overgrowth syndrome

== Microscopy ==
In the simplest form of the fecal fat test, a random fecal specimen is submitted to the hospital laboratory and examined under a microscope after staining with a Sudan III or Sudan IV dye ("Sudan staining"). Visible amounts of fat indicate some degree of fat malabsorption.

== Quantitative ==
Quantitative fecal fat tests measure and report an amount of fat. This is usually done over a period of three days, the patient collecting all of their feces into a container.

The container is thoroughly mixed to homogenize the feces, without using specific mixer equipment. A small sample from the feces is collected. The fat content is extracted with solvents and measured by saponification (turning the fat into soap).

Normally, up to 7 grams of fat can be malabsorbed in people consuming 100 grams of fat per day. In patients with diarrhea, up to 12 grams of fat may be malabsorbed since the presence of diarrhea interferes with fat absorption, even when the diarrhea is not due to fat malabsorption.
