= Sudan stain =

Group of dyes

Sudan stains and Sudan dyes are synthetic organic compounds that are used as dyes for various plastics (plastic colorants) and are also used to stain sudanophilic biological samples, usually lipids. Sudan II, Sudan III, Sudan IV, Oil Red O, and Sudan Black B are important members of this class of compounds (see images below).

== Staining ==
Sudan dyes have high affinity to fats, so they are used to demonstrate triglycerides, lipids, and lipoproteins. Alcoholic solutions of Sudan dyes are usually used, however pyridine solutions can be used in some situations as well.

Sudan stain test is often used to determine the level of fecal fat to diagnose steatorrhea. A small sample is dissolved in water or saline, glacial acetic acid is added to hydrolyze the insoluble salts of fatty acids, a few drops of alcoholic solution of Sudan III are added, the sample is spread on a microscopic slide, and heated twice to boil. Normally a stool sample should show only a few drops of red-orange stained fat under the microscope. The method is only semiquantitative but, due to its simplicity, it is used for screening.

== Dyeing ==
Since they are characteristically oil- and fat-soluble, Sudan dyes are also useful for dyeing plastics and fabrics. Sudan dyes I–IV and Sudan Red G consist of arylazo-substituted 2-naphthols. Such compounds are known to exist as a pair of tautomers:

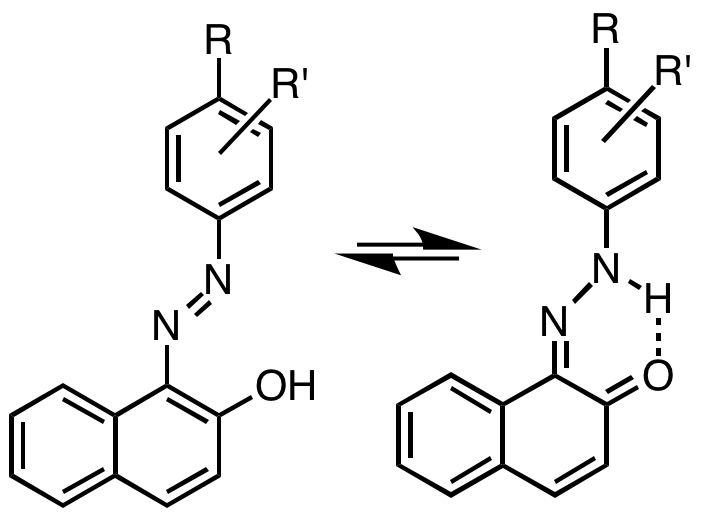

== Examples ==
Selected Sudan dyes

Sudan I

Sudan II

Sudan III

Sudan IV

Sudan Black B

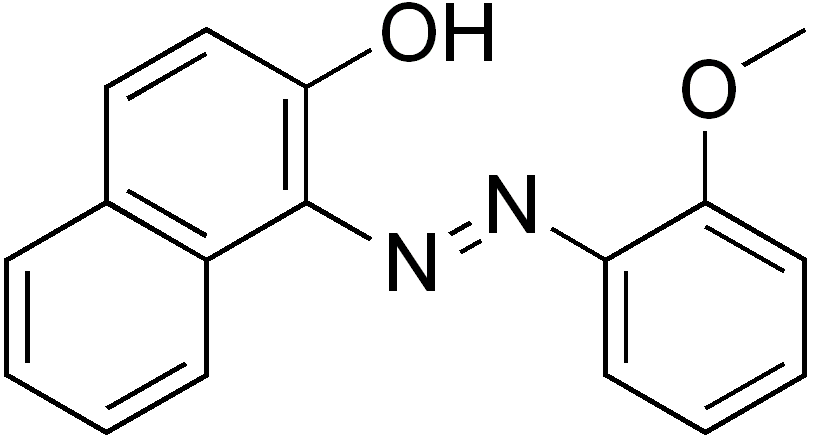
Sudan Red G

== Safety ==
Some spices exported from Asia have been adulterated with Sudan dyes, especially Sudan I and Sudan III, to enhance their colors. This finding has led to controversy because some Sudan dyes are carcinogenic in rats. In the 2024 Taiwanese Sudan Red contamination incident, chili powder distributed by a company tested positive for Sudan dyes, which led to many product recalls.
