= 2-Naphthylamine =

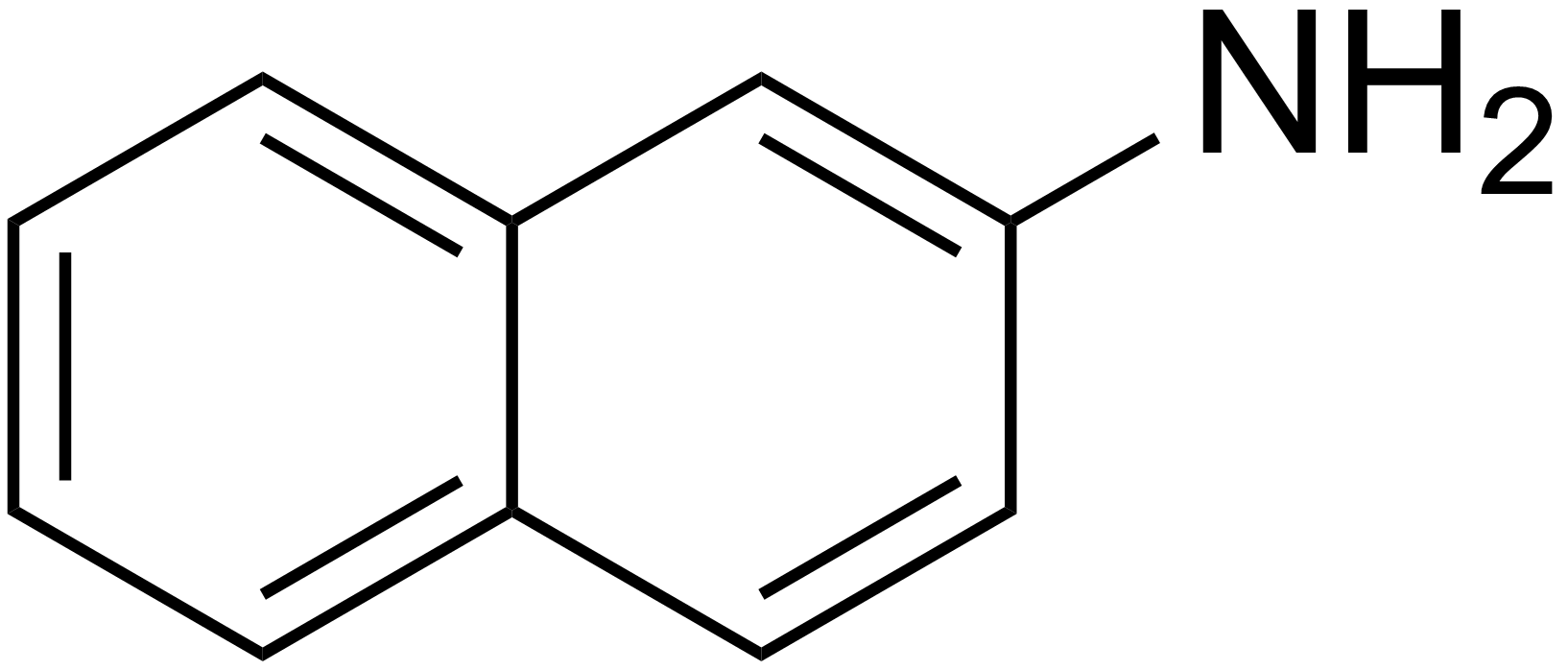
- Skeletal formula

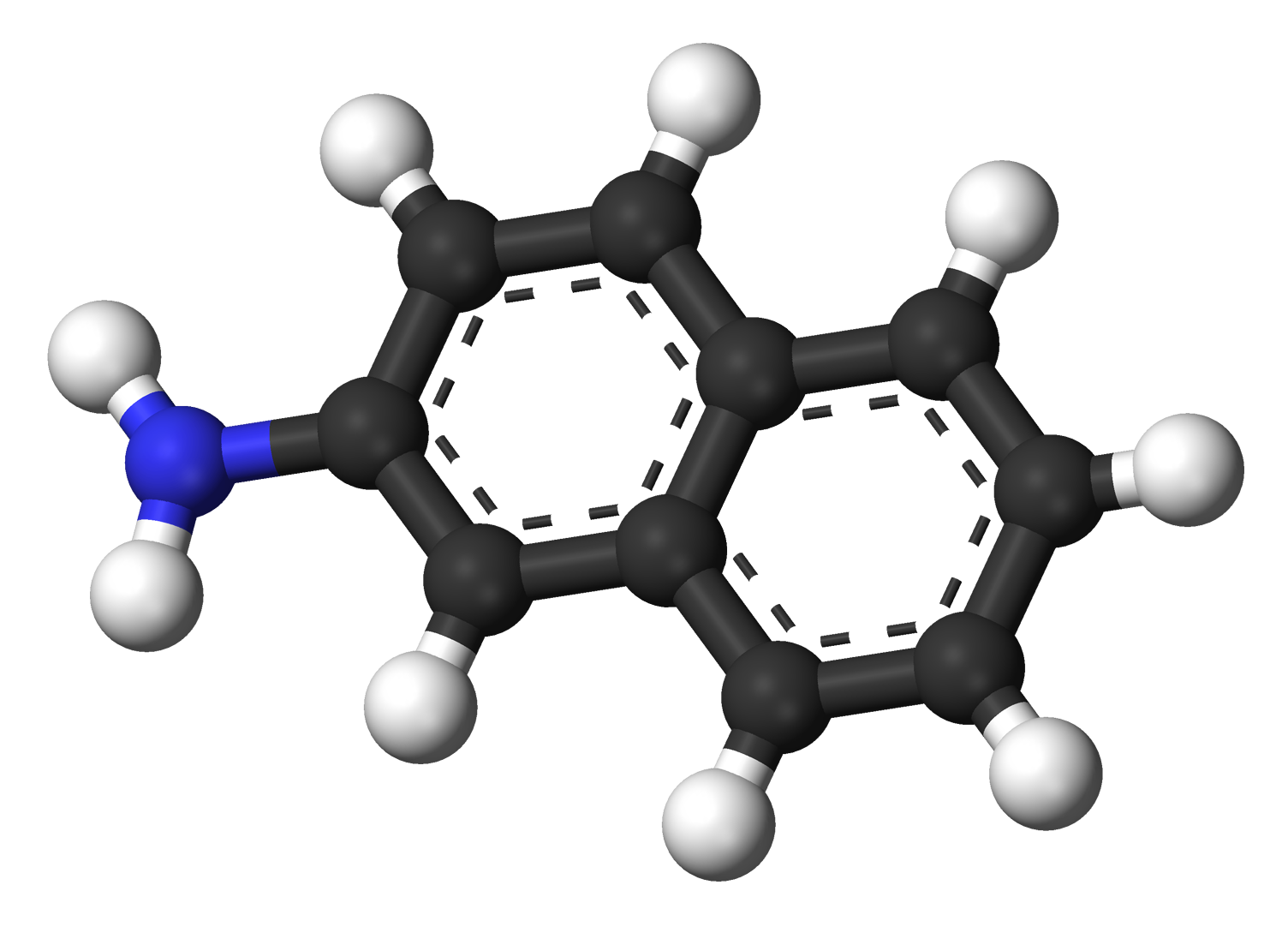
- Ball-and-stick model

Names
- Preferred IUPAC name Naphthalen-2-amine
- Other names 2-Naphthaleneamine; 2-Aminonaphthalene β-Naphthylamine β-Aminonaphthalene

Identifiers
CAS Number	91-59-8
3D model (JSmol)	Interactive image
Beilstein Reference	606264
ChEBI	CHEBI:27878
ChEMBL	ChEMBL278164
ChemSpider	6790
ECHA InfoCard	100.001.892
EC Number	202-080-4
Gmelin Reference	165176
KEGG	C02227
PubChem CID	7057
RTECS number	QM2100000
UNII	CKR7XL41N4
UN number	1650
CompTox Dashboard (EPA)	DTXSID2020921
- InChI: InChI=1S/C10H9N/c11-10-6-5-8-3-1-2-4-9(8)7-10/h1-7H,11H2 Key: JBIJLHTVPXGSAM-UHFFFAOYSA-N; InChI=1/C10H9N/c11-10-6-5-8-3-1-2-4-9(8)7-10/h1-7H,11H2 Key: JBIJLHTVPXGSAM-UHFFFAOYAA
- SMILES: c12ccccc1ccc(N)c2

Properties
Chemical formula	C_{10}H_{9}N
Molar mass	143.189 g·mol^{−1}
Appearance	White to red crystals
Odor	odorless
Density	1.061 g/cm^{3}
Melting point	111 to 113 °C (232 to 235 °F; 384 to 386 K)
Boiling point	306 °C (583 °F; 579 K)
Solubility in water	miscible in hot water
Vapor pressure	1 mmHg (107°C)
Acidity (pK_{a})	3.92
Magnetic susceptibility (χ)	−98.00·10^{−6} cm^{3}/mol

Hazards
- GHS labelling
Pictograms	(GHS07: Exclamation mark) (GHS08: Health hazard) (GHS09: Environmental hazard)
Signal word	Danger
Hazard statements	H302, H350, H411
Precautionary statements	P201, P202, P264, P270, P273, P281, P301+P312, P308+P313, P330, P391, P405, P501
Flash point	157 °C; 315 °F; 430 K

Related compounds
Related compounds	2-Naphthol
- Except where otherwise noted, data are given for materials in their standard state (at 25 °C [77 °F], 100 kPa). verify (what is ?) Infobox references

2-Naphthylamine or 2-aminonaphthalene is one of two isomeric aminonaphthalenes, compounds with the formula C_{10}H_{7}NH_{2}. It is a colorless solid, but samples take on a reddish color in air because of oxidation. It was formerly used to make azo dyes, but it is a known carcinogen and has largely been replaced by less toxic compounds.

== Preparation ==
2-Naphthylamine is prepared by heating 2-naphthol with ammonium zinc chloride to 200-210 °C, the Bucherer reaction. Its acetyl derivative can be obtained by heating 2-naphthol with ammonium acetate to 270-280 °C.

== Reactions ==
It gives no color with iron(III) chloride. When reduced by sodium in boiling amyl alcohol solution, it forms tetrahydro-3-naphthylamine, which exhibits the properties of the aliphatic amines in that it is strongly alkaline in reaction, has an ammoniacal odor and cannot be diazotized. On oxidation, it yields ortho-carboxy-hydrocinnamic acid, HO_{2}CC_{6}H_{4}CH_{2}CH_{2}CO_{2}H.

Numerous sulfonic acid derivatives of 2-naphthylamine are used in commerce, such as precursors to dyes. Owing to the carcinogenicity of the amine, these derivatives are mainly prepared by amination of the corresponding naphthols. Of them, the δ-acid and Bronner's acid are of more value technically, since they combine with ortho-tetrazoditolyl to produce fine red dye-stuffs.

2-Naphthylamine was previously used as a dye precursor and rubber antioxidant in the 1930s, 40s and 50s. Dupont stopped using it in the 1970s.

== Role in disease ==
2-Naphthylamine is found in cigarette smoke and suspected to contribute to the development of bladder cancer.

It is activated in the liver but quickly deactivated by conjugation to glucuronic acid. In the bladder, glucuronidase re-activates it by deconjugation, which leads to the development of bladder cancer.

== See also ==
- Naphthalene
- Naphthol
- 1-Naphthylamine
- 1,8-Bis(dimethylamino)naphthalene
