= Sudan I =

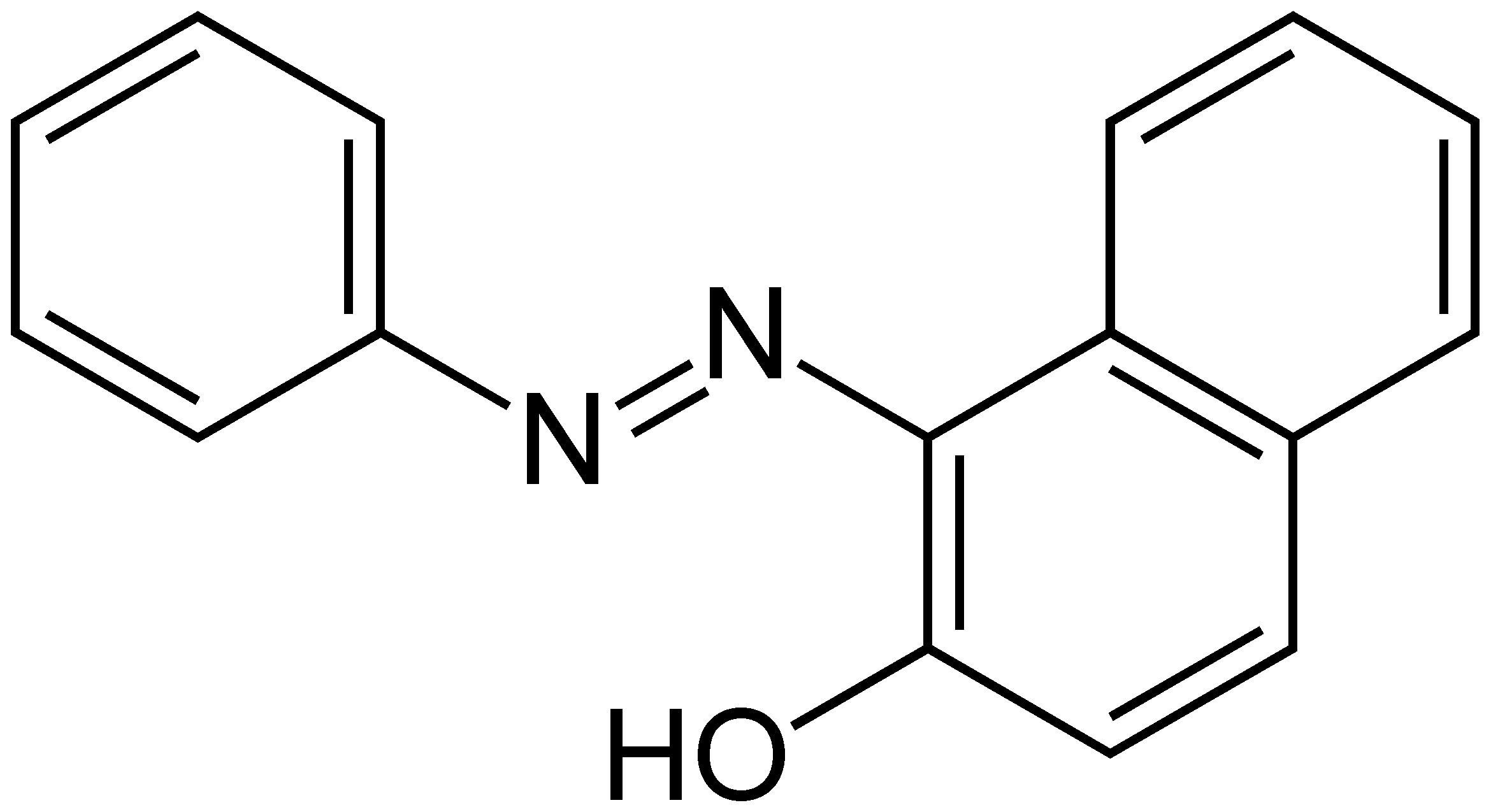
- Sudan I

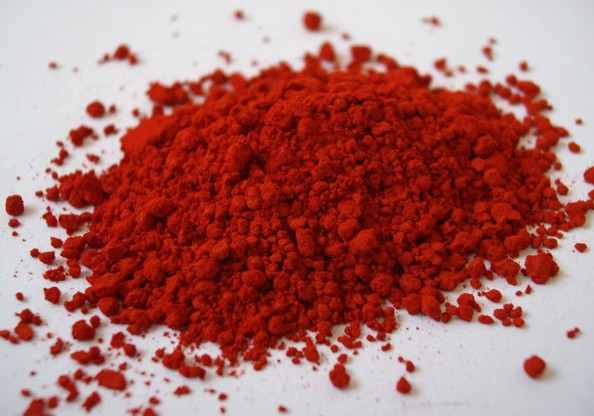

Names
- IUPAC name 1-(Phenyldiazenyl)naphthalen-2-ol
- Other names: Solvent Yellow 14; C.I. Solvent Yellow 14; Solvent Orange R; 1-Phenylazo-2-naphthol

Identifiers
| CAS Number | 842-07-9 |
| 3D model (JSmol) | Interactive image |
| ChEBI | CHEBI:30958 |
| ChEMBL | ChEMBL1397023 |
| ChemSpider | 10296256 |
| ECHA InfoCard | 100.011.517 |
| EC Number | 212-668-2 |
| KEGG | C19525 |
| PubChem CID | 13297 |
| UNII | 48I7IBB68J |
| CompTox Dashboard (EPA) | DTXSID90873447 DTXSID4021135, DTXSID90873447 |
- InChI: InChI=1S/C16H12N2O/c19-15-11-10-12-6-4-5-9-14(12)16(15)18-17-13-7-2-1-3-8-13/h1-11,19H/b18-17+ Key: MRQIXHXHHPWVIL-ISLYRVAYSA-N; InChI=1/C16H12N2O/c19-15-11-10-12-6-4-5-9-14(12)16(15)18-17-13-7-2-1-3-8-13/h1-11,19H/b18-17+ Key: MRQIXHXHHPWVIL-ISLYRVAYBO
- SMILES: Oc3ccc1ccccc1c3/N=N/c2ccccc2

Properties
| Chemical formula | C_{16}H_{12}N_{2}O |
| Molar mass | 248.28 g/mol |
| Density | 1.2g/cm^{3} |
| Melting point | 131 °C (268 °F; 404 K) |
| Boiling point | 443.7 °C (830.7 °F; 716.8 K) |
| Magnetic susceptibility (χ) | −1.376×10^{−4} cm^{3}/mol |

Hazards
- GHS labelling
| Pictograms | (GHS07: Exclamation mark) (GHS08: Health hazard) |
| Signal word | Warning |
| Hazard statements | H317, H341, H351, H413 |
| Precautionary statements | P201, P202, P261, P272, P273, P280, P281, P302+P352, P308+P313, P321, P333+P313, P363, P405, P501 |
| Flash point | 290.2 °C |
- Except where otherwise noted, data are given for materials in their standard state (at 25 °C [77 °F], 100 kPa). verify (what is ?) Infobox references

Sudan I (also known as CI Solvent Yellow 14 or Solvent Orange R) is an organic compound typically classified as an azo dye. It is an orange-red solid, used to color waxes, oils, petrol, solvents, and polishes. Historically, Sudan I used to serve as a food coloring agent, notably for curry powder and chili powder. However, along with its derivatives Sudan III and Sudan IV, the compound has been banned for use in food in many countries (including the United States and the European Union) due to its classification as a category 3 carcinogen by the International Agency for Research on Cancer (not classifiable as to its carcinogenicity in humans). Nevertheless, Sudan I remains valuable as a coloring reagent for non-food-related uses, such as in the formulation of orange-colored smoke.

== Application ==
The Sudan dyes are a group of azo compounds which have been used to color hydrocarbon solvents, oils, fats, waxes, shoes, and floor polishes. As recently as 1974, about 270,000 kg (600,000 lb) of Sudan I, 236,000 kg (520,000 lb) of Sudan II, 70,000 kg (150,000 lb) of Sudan III, and 1,075,000 kg (2,370,000 lb) of Sudan IV was produced in the United States.

Sudan I and Sudan III (1-(4-(phenyldiazenyl)phenyl) azo naphthalen-2-ol) are primarily used for the same application.

Sudan III melts at a 68°C (154.4°F), a much lower temperature than Sudan I, which melts at 131°C (268°F).

== Synthesis ==
There are two steps in synthesizing this compound:

The first step is the preparation of a benzene diazonium chloride solution, a diazonium salt created from the reaction of aniline with nitrous acid generated by the reaction of sodium nitrite and hydrochloric acid.

The second step involves adding the solution of the diazonium salt to 2-naphthol, to produce the diazo dye.

Sudan I is prone to photodegradation when exposed to light. This process involves the breakdown of the dye due to the interaction with singlet oxygen and free radicals. As a result, the colorfastness of Sudan I on materials is poor.

== Degradation and metabolism ==
The metabolism of Sudan I, as characterized in rabbits, involves both oxidative and reductive reactions.

The biological breakdown of the nitrogen-nitrogen bond by hydrogenation of the Sudan I molecule (azo-reduction) produces aniline and 1-amino-2-naphthol. This reaction appears to contribute to the detoxification observed in animal studies. After oxidation of Sudan I, C-hydroxylated metabolites are formed as major oxidation products and are excreted in urine. These metabolites are also found after oxidation with rat hepatic microsomes in vitro.

The C-hydroxylated metabolites may be considered as the detoxification products, while the benzene diazonium ion (BDI), formed by the microsome-catalyzed enzymatic splitting of the azo group of Sudan I, reacts with DNA in vitro. The major DNA adduct formed from this reaction is the 8-(phenylazo)guanine adduct, which was also found in the liver DNA of rats who were exposed to Sudan I.

The formation of C-hydroxylated metabolites and DNA-adducts from Sultan I oxidation was also demonstrated with human cytochrome P450 (CYP) enzymes, with CYP1A1 being the major enzyme involved in the oxidation of Sudan I in human tissues rich in this enzyme, while CYP3A4 is also active in human liver.

CYP1A1 constitutes less than 0.7% of the total hepatic CYP expression in human livers but can be responsible for up to 30% of the oxidation of Sudan I in a set of human liver microsomes. Moreover, Sudan I strongly induces CYP1A1 in rats and human cells in culture due to the activation of the cytosolic aryl hydrocarbon receptor.

In addition to oxidation by CYP enzymes, Sudan I and its C-hydroxylated metabolites are oxidized by peroxidases, such as a model plant peroxidase and the mammalian enzyme cyclooxygenase. In bladder tissue, CYP enzymes are not detectable, but relatively high levels of peroxidases are expressed. As a consequence, DNA, RNA, and protein adducts are formed. (Note: Attributed to multiple references:) Therefore, peroxidase-catalyzed activation of Sudan I has been suggested as mechanism. This is similar to other carcinogens, such as the carcinogenic aromatic amines. (Note: Attributed to multiple references:)

It has been suggested that a CYP- or peroxidase-mediated activation of Sudan I or a combination of both mechanisms may be responsible for the organ specificity of this carcinogen for the liver and urinary bladder in animals. The Sudan I metabolites formed by peroxidase are much less likely to be formed at physiological conditions because in vivo there are many nucleophilic molecules present which scavenge the Sudan I reactive species. Hence, the formation of adducts in the Sudan I reactive species with nucleophilic species (such as DNA, tRNA, proteins, polynucleotides, and polydeoxynucleotides) seems to be the preferred reaction under physiological conditions, with deoxyguanosine as the major target for Sudan-I DNA binding, followed by deoxyadenosine.

== Effect on humans ==
Sudan I is determined to be a health hazard by EU chemical regulators as well as the IARC. It may cause allergic skin reactions and skin irritation. Exposure to the skin can happen by textile workers being subjected to direct exposure, or by wearing tight-fitting textiles dyed with Sudan I. Allergic reactions are induced when the azo dye binds to the human serum albumin (HSA), forming a dye-HSA conjugate which immunoglobulin E binds to, leading to an eventual release of histamine.

Sudan I is also suspected of causing genetic defects. The mutagenicity and genetic hazard have been evaluated with the Ames test and animal experiments. Furthermore, it is suspected of causing cancer. The carcinogenicity was estimated merely through animal testing. It has not been verified in human subjects yet.

== Safety and regulation ==
The regulation of Sudan I in Europe started in 2003, after repeated notifications were published in the EU rapid alert system. The EU rapid alert system announced that Sudan I was found in chili powder and other foods that were prepared with it. Due to the suspicion of genotoxicity and mutagenicity of Sudan I, a daily intake was not tolerable. The European Commission therefore prohibited the import of chili and hot chili products. The German Federal Institute for Risk Assessment was asked its opinion and came to the conclusion that Sudan dyes are harmful to health. Sudan I was classified as a category three carcinogen and category three mutagen in Annex I of Directive 67/548/EC. This classification was based on findings from animal experiments from this organisation.

The regulation of azo colorants by ‘The EU azo Colorants Directive 2002/61/EC’ has been replaced by the REACH regulation in 2009, when azo dyes were put on the REACH Restriction list Annex XVII. This includes that said dyes are forbidden to be used in textiles and leather, that may come in direct and prolonged contact with the skin or oral cavity. No textiles made of leather material are allowed to be coloured with azo dyes, a specific list of which items can be found in the Official Journal of the European Union. Furthermore, it is prohibited, in the European Union, to place any textile or leather articles coloured with azo dyes on the market.

A certificate for azo dyes exists to ensure that dyes that cleave to one of the forbidden amines are not being used for dyeing. All dyers should ensure that the supply company is fully informed about the legislation of the prohibited azo dyes. To ensure this, they should be members of the ETAD (Ecological and Toxicological Association of Dyes and Organic Pigments Manufacturers) from which they can receive their certificate. Non-ETAD member suppliers will be correlated with doubt about the origin and safety of their dyes. Dyes without certification are not advised to be used.

== Toxicology, genotoxicity, and mutagenesis ==
=== Humans ===
No specific information exists on Sudan I related to the toxic, genotoxic, and mutagenic effect on humans.

=== Animal experiments ===
Sudan I was associated with a significant increase in neoplastic nodules and carcinomas in both male and female rats. Other studies, however, showed no significantly increased incidence of micro-nucleated hepatocytes after the administration of Sudan I. These results suggest that the liver carcinogenicity may not be due to the genotoxic effects of Sudan I. No carcinogenic effects were visible in livers of mice after the application of Sudan I. But when Sudan I is applied subcutaneously to mice, liver tumors were found.

Furthermore, DNA damage was depicted in the stomach and liver cells of mice. In rats, no significant increase was found in the amount of micro-nucleated epithelial cells of the gastrointestinal tract. This indicates the absence of genotoxic compounds in the gastrointestinal epithelial cells in rats.

Contradictory to the findings in the gastrointestinal tract and liver, there was an increase in micro-nucleated cells found in the bone marrow. The frequency of micro-nucleated bone marrow cells increased in a dose-dependent manner. Significantly higher frequencies of micro-nucleated immature erythrocytes (MNIME) were found at a dose of 150mg/day or more. This supports the explanation that Sudan I is oxidized or activated by peroxidase in the blood cells, thereby forming micro-nucleated cells.

Guanosine DNA adducts derived from peroxidase metabolites of Sudan I were also found in vivo, in the bladder of rats. The bladder also contains high levels of tissue peroxidase.

=== Toxicology ===
Sudan I is genotoxic. It is also carcinogenic in rats. Comparisons between experimental animals and human Cytochrome P450 (CYP) suggest animal carcinogenicity data may be extrapolated to humans, although the IARC has not done this.

Sudan I is also present as an impurity in Sunset Yellow FCF, which is its desulfonated water-soluble version.

== Food scare ==
In February 2005, Sudan I gained attention, particularly in the United Kingdom. It was identified as a contaminant in Worcestershire sauce produced by Premier Foods. The Food Standards Agency traced the source of the contamination to adulterated chili powder.

== See also ==
- Para Red
