= C22H16N4O =

The molecular formula C_{22}H_{16}N_{4}O (molar mass: 352.39 g/mol, exact mass: 352.1324 u) may refer to:

- Sudan III
