= Para red =

Names
- Preferred IUPAC name 1-[(E)-(4-Nitrophenyl)diazenyl]naphthalen-2-ol
- Other names 1-[(4-Nitrophenyl)azo]-2-naphthalenol, 1-((4-nitrophenyl)azo)-2-naphthol, 1-[(p-nitrophenyl)azo]-2-naphthalenol, 1-[(p-nitrophenyl)azo]-2-naphthol, 1-[(E)-(4-Nitrophenyl)diazenyl]-2-naphthol, paranitraniline red, Pigment Red 1, C.I. 12070, Recolite Para Red B, Carnelio Para Red BS

Identifiers
CAS Number	6410-10-2
3D model (JSmol)	Interactive image
ChEMBL	ChEMBL1967257
ChemSpider	13544963
ECHA InfoCard	100.026.449
EC Number	229-093-8
PubChem CID	22917
UNII	D54Q24K2EI
CompTox Dashboard (EPA)	DTXSID1052325
- InChI: InChI=1S/C16H11N3O3/c20-15-10-5-11-3-1-2-4-14(11)16(15)18-17-12-6-8-13(9-7-12)19(21)22/h1-10,20H/b18-17+ Key: WOTPFVNWMLFMFW-ISLYRVAYSA-N; InChI=1/C16H11N3O3/c20-15-10-5-11-3-1-2-4-14(11)16(15)18-17-12-6-8-13(9-7-12)19(21)22/h1-10,20H/b18-17+ Key: WOTPFVNWMLFMFW-ISLYRVAYBR
- SMILES: O=N(=O)c1ccc(cc1)/N=N/c2c3ccccc3ccc2O

Properties
Chemical formula	C_{16}H_{11}N_{3}O_{3}
Molar mass	293.282 g·mol^{−1}
Appearance	Red solid
Melting point	248 to 252 °C (478 to 486 °F; 521 to 525 K)

Hazards
- GHS labelling
Pictograms	(GHS07: Exclamation mark)
Signal word	Warning
Hazard statements	H315, H319, H335
Precautionary statements	P261, P264, P271, P280, P302+P352, P304+P340, P305+P351+P338, P312, P321, P332+P313, P337+P313, P362, P403+P233, P405, P501
- Except where otherwise noted, data are given for materials in their standard state (at 25 °C [77 °F], 100 kPa). verify (what is ?) Infobox references

Para red (paranitraniline red, Pigment Red 1, C.I. 12070) is a dye. Chemically, it is similar to Sudan I. It was discovered in 1880 by von Gallois and Ullrich. It dyes cellulose fabrics a brilliant red color, but is not very fast. The dye can be washed away easily from cellulose fabrics if not dyed correctly. Acidic and basic stages both occur during the standard formation of Para red, and acidic or basic byproducts may be present in the final product.

== Synthesis ==
Para red is prepared by diazotization of para-nitroaniline at ice-cold temperatures, followed by coupling with β-naphthol:

Synthesis of Para Red

== Regulation ==
Para red is not approved for use in food in any jurisdiction. In 2005, Old El Paso dinner kits were found to be contaminated with the dye and removed from supermarket shelves.
