= Solvent Black 3 =

Names
- IUPAC name (2,2-dimethyl-1,3-dihydroperimidin-6-yl)-(4-phenylazo-1-naphthyl)diazene
- Other names Sudan Black; Fat Black HB; Solvent Black 3; C.I. 26150

Identifiers
CAS Number	4197-25-5
3D model (JSmol)	Interactive image
ChEBI	CHEBI:88216
ChemSpider	55272
ECHA InfoCard	100.021.898
MeSH	Sudan+Black+B
PubChem CID	61336
UNII	9YDL1Q990E
CompTox Dashboard (EPA)	DTXSID0052091
- InChI: InChI=1S/C29H24N6/c1-29(2)30-26-14-8-13-22-25(17-18-27(31-29)28(22)26)35-34-24-16-15-23(20-11-6-7-12-21(20)24)33-32-19-9-4-3-5-10-19/h3-18,30-31H,1-2H3/b33-32+,35-34+ Key: YCUVUDODLRLVIC-VPHDGDOJSA-N; InChI=1/C29H24N6/c1-29(2)30-26-14-8-13-22-25(17-18-27(31-29)28(22)26)35-34-24-16-15-23(20-11-6-7-12-21(20)24)33-32-19-9-4-3-5-10-19/h3-18,30-31H,1-2H3/b33-32+,35-34+ Key: YCUVUDODLRLVIC-VPHDGDOJBF
- SMILES: N(=N/c5c1c(cccc1)c(/N=N/c4c2cccc3NC(Nc(c23)cc4)(C)C)cc5)\c6ccccc6

Properties
Chemical formula	C_{29}H_{24}N_{6}
Molar mass	456.54 g/mol
Melting point	120 to 124 °C (248 to 255 °F; 393 to 397 K)
- Except where otherwise noted, data are given for materials in their standard state (at 25 °C [77 °F], 100 kPa). verify (what is ?) Infobox references

Solvent Black 3 is an azo dye. It is a non-fluorescent, relatively thermostable lysochrome (fat-soluble dye) diazo dye used for staining of neutral triglycerides and lipids on frozen sections and some lipoproteins on paraffin sections. It has the appearance of a dark brown to black powder with maximum absorption at 596–605 nm and melting point 120–124 °C. It stains blue-black.

== Applications ==
Solvent Black 3 is used for a wide variety of commercial applications.

In the laboratory, Solvent Black 3 is used for Sudan staining. Similar dyes include Oil Red O, Sudan III, and Sudan IV. It can be used to stain some other materials than the other Sudan dyes, as it is not so specific to lipids. It is used in fingerprint enhancement. It is useful for detecting fats that are contaminated with oil and grease. In differentiating haematological disorders, it will stain myeloblasts but not lymphoblasts.

It was introduced by Lison and Dagnelie in 1935.

== Production and composition ==
Sudan Black is formed by coupling of diazotized 4-phenylazo-1-naphthylamine with 2,3-dihydro-2,2-dimethyl-1H-perimidine. Therefore, the main product expected was 2,3-dihydro-2,2dimethyl-6-[(4-phenylazo-1-naphthalenyl)-azo]-1H-perimidine. However the dye resulting from the above reaction product actually contains many, up to 42 colored and colorless by-products that can be fractionated. The two major products were blue in color confirmed by various chromatographic (TLC and column etc.) separation and spectroscopic (IR, NMR, Mass) identification were named SBB-I & SBB-II (Rf values of 0.49 and 0.19 (chloroform/benzene 1:1, SiO2) in thin Layer Chromatography). The above described product indeed turned out to be SSB-II which comprises up to 60% of the mixture, and the SBB-I was 2,3-dihydro-2,2-dimethyl-4-[(4-phenylazo-1-naphthalenyl)-azo]-1H-perimidine.
