= Sudan Red 7B =

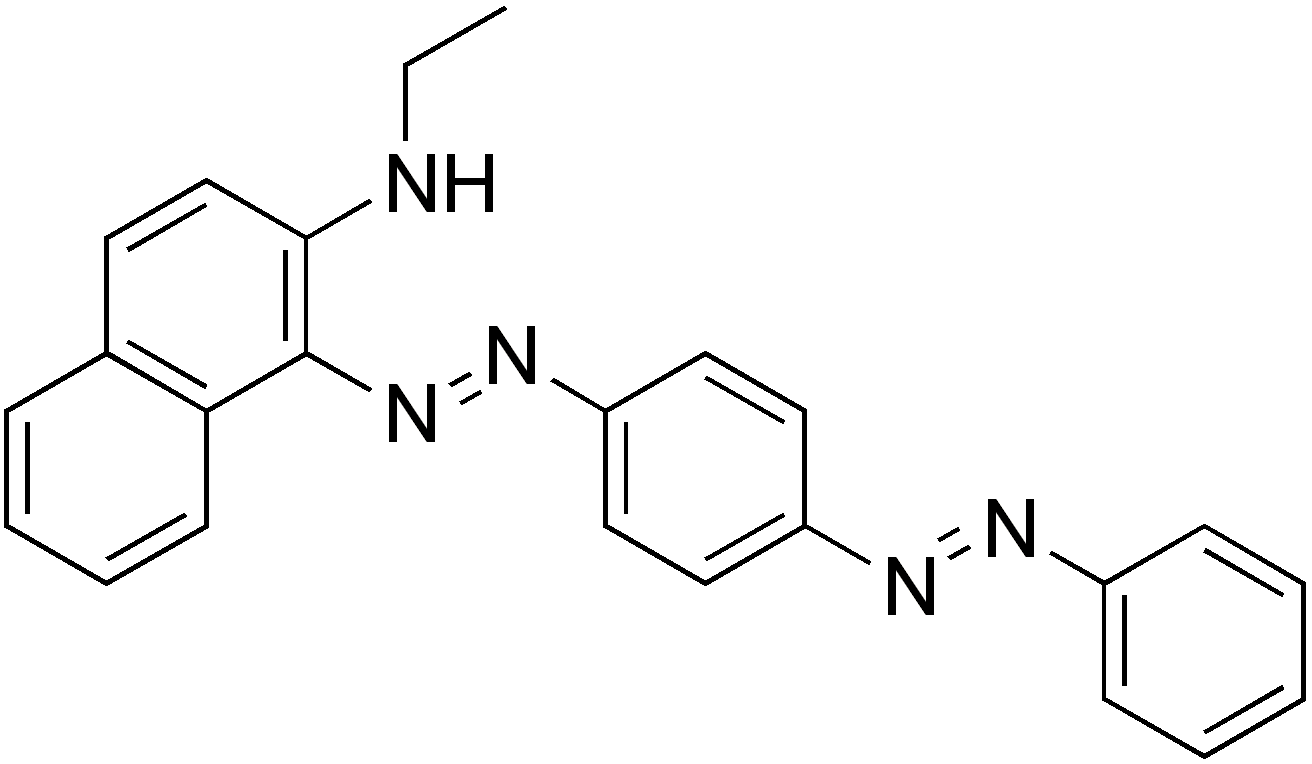

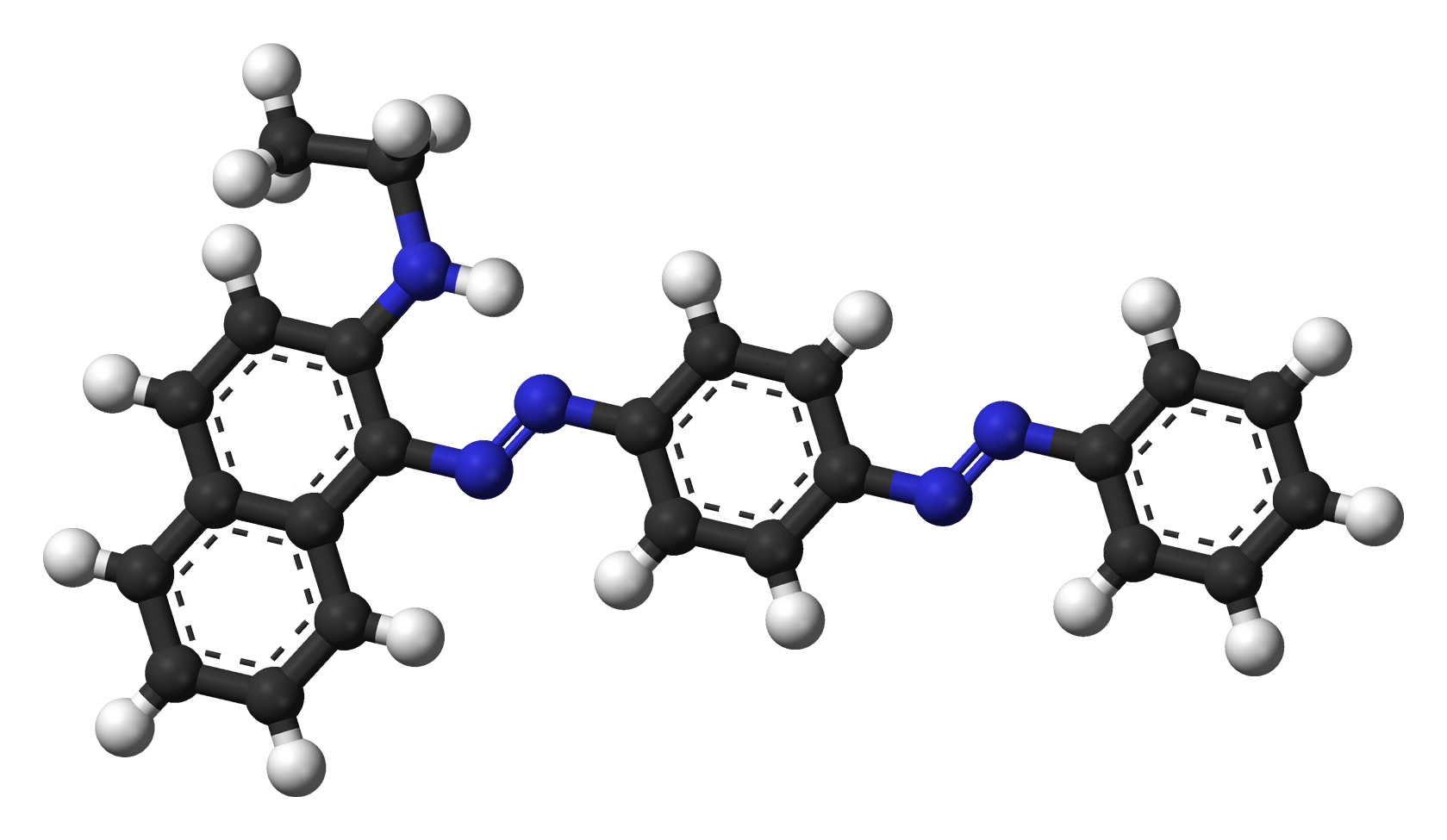

Names
- Preferred IUPAC name N-Ethyl-1-{[4-(phenyldiazenyl)phenyl]diazenyl}naphthalen-2-amine
- Other names Solvent Red 19; Ceres Red 7B; Fat Red 7B; Hexatype carmine B; Lacquer red V3B; Oil violet; Organol bordeaux B; Sudanrot 7B; Typogen carmine; C.I. 26050; N-ethyl-1-[[p-(phenylazo)phenyl]azo]-2-naphthalenamine

Identifiers
CAS Number	6368-72-5
3D model (JSmol)	Interactive image
ChemSpider	55325
ECHA InfoCard	100.026.238
KEGG	C19529
PubChem CID	61396
UNII	8QUH39Y06P
CompTox Dashboard (EPA)	DTXSID4064266
- InChI: InChI=1S/C24H21N5/c1-2-25-23-17-12-18-8-6-7-11-22(18)24(23)29-28-21-15-13-20(14-16-21)27-26-19-9-4-3-5-10-19/h3-17,25H,2H2,1H3/b27-26+,29-28+ Key: VKWNTWQXVLKCSG-ZDXBJJIESA-N; InChI=1/C24H21N5/c1-2-25-23-17-12-18-8-6-7-11-22(18)24(23)29-28-21-15-13-20(14-16-21)27-26-19-9-4-3-5-10-19/h3-17,25H,2H2,1H3/b27-26+,29-28+ Key: VKWNTWQXVLKCSG-ZDXBJJIEBU
- SMILES: N(=N/c3ccc(/N=N/c1c2c(ccc1NCC)cccc2)cc3)\c4ccccc4

Properties
Chemical formula	C_{24}H_{21}N_{5}
Molar mass	379.467 g·mol^{−1}
- Except where otherwise noted, data are given for materials in their standard state (at 25 °C [77 °F], 100 kPa). verify (what is ?) Infobox references

Sudan Red 7B, also known as Solvent Red 19, Ceres Red 7B, Fat Red 7B, Hexatype carmine B, Lacquer red V3B, Oil violet, Organol bordeaux B, Sudanrot 7B, Typogen carmine, and C.I. 26050, is a red diazo dye. Chemically it is N-ethyl-1-[[p-(phenylazo)phenyl]azo]-2-naphthalenamine. It is soluble in oils and insoluble in water.

It is used in biology for staining, and in industry as one of the fuel dyes. It can be also present in red laser toners.
