= Tripalmitin =

- Skeletal formula of tripalmitin

Names
- Systematic IUPAC name Propane-1,2,3-triyl tri(hexadecanoate)
- Other names Palmitin; Glycerol tripalmitate; Glycerin tripalmitate; Glyceryl tripalmitate; Palmitic triglyceride; Tripalmitoyl glycerol

Identifiers
CAS Number	555-44-2
3D model (JSmol)	Interactive image
ChemSpider	10674
ECHA InfoCard	100.008.272
EC Number	209-098-1
PubChem CID	11147
RTECS number	RT4953500
UNII	D133ZRF50U
CompTox Dashboard (EPA)	DTXSID8046169
- InChI: InChI=1S/C51H98O6/c1-4-7-10-13-16-19-22-25-28-31-34-37-40-43-49(52)55-46-48(57-51(54)45-42-39-36-33-30-27-24-21-18-15-12-9-6-3)47-56-50(53)44-41-38-35-32-29-26-23-20-17-14-11-8-5-2/h48H,4-47H2,1-3H3 Key: PVNIQBQSYATKKL-UHFFFAOYSA-N; InChI=1/C51H98O6/c1-4-7-10-13-16-19-22-25-28-31-34-37-40-43-49(52)55-46-48(57-51(54)45-42-39-36-33-30-27-24-21-18-15-12-9-6-3)47-56-50(53)44-41-38-35-32-29-26-23-20-17-14-11-8-5-2/h48H,4-47H2,1-3H3 Key: PVNIQBQSYATKKL-UHFFFAOYAV
- SMILES: O=C(OCC(OC(=O)CCCCCCCCCCCCCCC)COC(=O)CCCCCCCCCCCCCCC)CCCCCCCCCCCCCCC

Properties
Chemical formula	C_{51}H_{98}O_{6}
Molar mass	807.339 g·mol^{−1}
Appearance	White powder
Density	0.8752 g/cm^{3} (70 °C)
Melting point	44.7–67.4 °C (112.5–153.3 °F; 317.8–340.5 K)
Boiling point	315 °C (599 °F; 588 K) at 760 mmHg
Solubility in water	Insoluble
Solubility	Soluble in EtOH, (C_{2}H_{5})_{2}O, C_{6}H_{6}, CHCl_{3}
Refractive index (n_{D})	1.4381 (80 °C)

Structure
Crystal structure	Triclinic (β-form)
Space group	P1̅ (β-form)

Thermochemistry
Heat capacity (C)	1219.4 J/mol·K (β-form, 281.2 K); 1753.1 J/mol·K (338.8 K)
Std molar entropy (S^{⦵}_{298})	1387.4 J/mol·K (liquid)
Std enthalpy of formation (Δ_{f}H^{⦵}_{298})	−2468.7 kJ/mol
Std enthalpy of combustion (Δ_{c}H^{⦵}_{298})	−31605.9 kJ/mol

Hazards
- GHS labelling
Pictograms	(GHS09: Environmental hazard)
Signal word	Warning
Hazard statements	H411
Precautionary statements	P273, P391, P501
NFPA 704 (fire diamond)	0 1 0
- Except where otherwise noted, data are given for materials in their standard state (at 25 °C [77 °F], 100 kPa). Infobox references

Tripalmitin is a triglyceride derived from the fatty acid palmitic acid.
