= Solvent Yellow 56 =

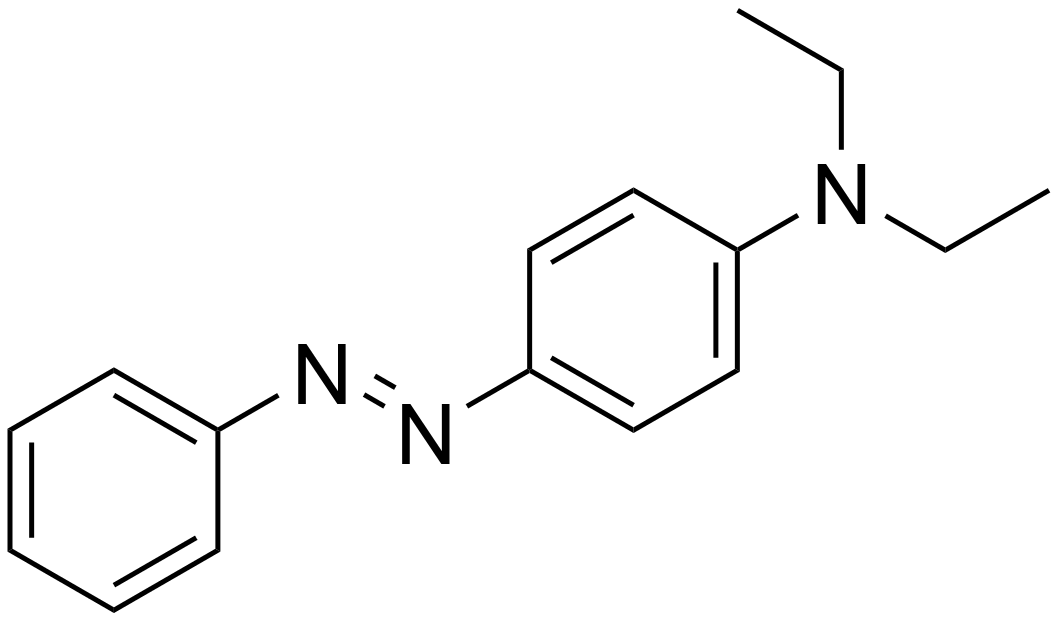

Names
- Other names Solvent yellow 56; C.I. 11021

Identifiers
CAS Number	2481-94-9
3D model (JSmol)	Interactive image
ChEBI	CHEBI:91087
ChemSpider	16286
ECHA InfoCard	100.017.834
PubChem CID	17204
UNII	5E973680S8
CompTox Dashboard (EPA)	DTXSID8041745
- InChI: InChI=1S/C16H19N3/c1-3-19(4-2)16-12-10-15(11-13-16)18-17-14-8-6-5-7-9-14/h5-13H,3-4H2,1-2H3/b18-17+ Key: SJJISKLXUJVZOA-ISLYRVAYSA-N; InChI=1/C16H19N3/c1-3-19(4-2)16-12-10-15(11-13-16)18-17-14-8-6-5-7-9-14/h5-13H,3-4H2,1-2H3/b18-17+ Key: SJJISKLXUJVZOA-ISLYRVAYBE
- SMILES: N(=N/c1ccc(N(CC)CC)cc1)\c2ccccc2

Properties
Chemical formula	C_{16}H_{19}N_{3}
Molar mass	253.349 g·mol^{−1}
Melting point	168 °C (334 °F; 441 K)
- Except where otherwise noted, data are given for materials in their standard state (at 25 °C [77 °F], 100 kPa). verify (what is ?) Infobox references

Solvent Yellow 56 is the organic compound N,N-diethyl-p-(phenylazo)aniline. It is an azo dye, which has the appearance of a reddish yellow powder. Its EINECS number is 219-616-8. Its structure is similar to Solvent Yellow 124, which used as a fuel dye in European Union, and to Aniline Yellow.

== Uses ==
It is used to dye hydrocarbon solvents, oils, fats, waxes (candles), notably petrol, mineral oil and shoe polishes, and polystyrene resins. In pyrotechnics, it is used in some yellow colored smokes, reflecting its tendency to sublime.
