= Fuel dye =

Dyes added to identify fuels

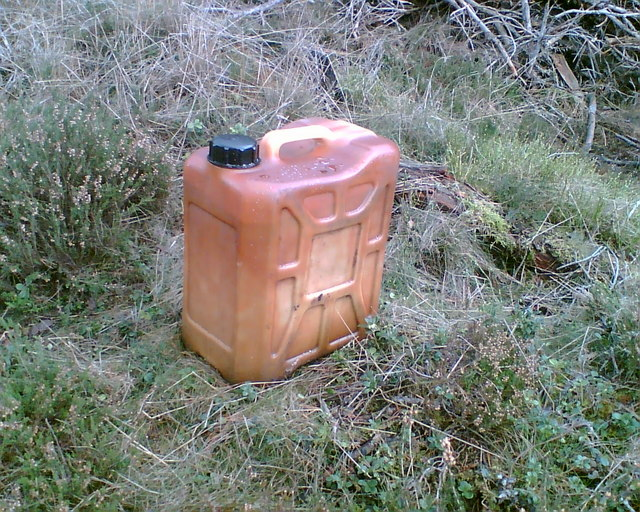
Plastic jerrycan containing 'red' diesel

Fuel dyes are dyes added to fuels, as in some countries it is required by law to dye a low-tax fuel to deter its use in applications intended for higher-taxed ones. Untaxed fuels are referred to as "dyed", while taxed ones are called "clear" or "white".

Aviation gasoline is dyed, both for tax reasons (avgas is typically taxed to support aviation infrastructure) as well as safety (due to the consequences of fuelling an aircraft with the wrong kind of fuel).

== Types of dyes ==
The dyes used have to be soluble in the fuels they are added to and therefore in hydrocarbon-based nonpolar solvents ("solvent dyes"). Red dyes are often various diazo dyes, e.g., Solvent Red 19, Solvent Red 24, and Solvent Red 26. Anthraquinone dyes are used for green and blue shades, e.g., Solvent Green 33, Solvent Blue 35 and Solvent Blue 26.

The pure dyes found in modern liquid petroleum dyes are longer alkyl side chain forms of traditional dyes and normally multiple chain length variations of the chromophore are found within a typical commercial liquid petroleum dye. For instance, Sudan Red 462 is a form of Solvent Red 19, with the ethyl side chain replaced by either a 2-ethylhexyl or a tridecyl side chain. The longer branched side chains improve solubility dramatically, but in some cases the high solubility prevents the dye being isolated as a crystal, except at very low temperatures. The high-solubility liquid dyes originated with Morton International and BASF (ACNA Italy) as the primary inventors. For instance, Morton International created Solvent Blue 98 as a high solubility form of Solvent Blue 35. BASF created Solvent Blue 79 as its high solubility form of Solvent Blue 35. In some cases it is possible, with normal solvents—e.g., xylene—to prepare stable (to -20C) solutions at 65% "solids" content. The original powder dye form of the chromophore would not be soluble beyond 2% in xylene.

Only a few refineries worldwide still use powder dyes for colouring fuels, as although they are lower cost per active molecule of dye chromophore than the modified forms, they have significant handling issues and health and safety issues that inherently arise from the handling of azo dyes (reds/yellows/green mixes). It is advantageous to mix a liquid with a liquid instead of handling powdered dyes into a liquid.

== Fuel dye in Europe ==
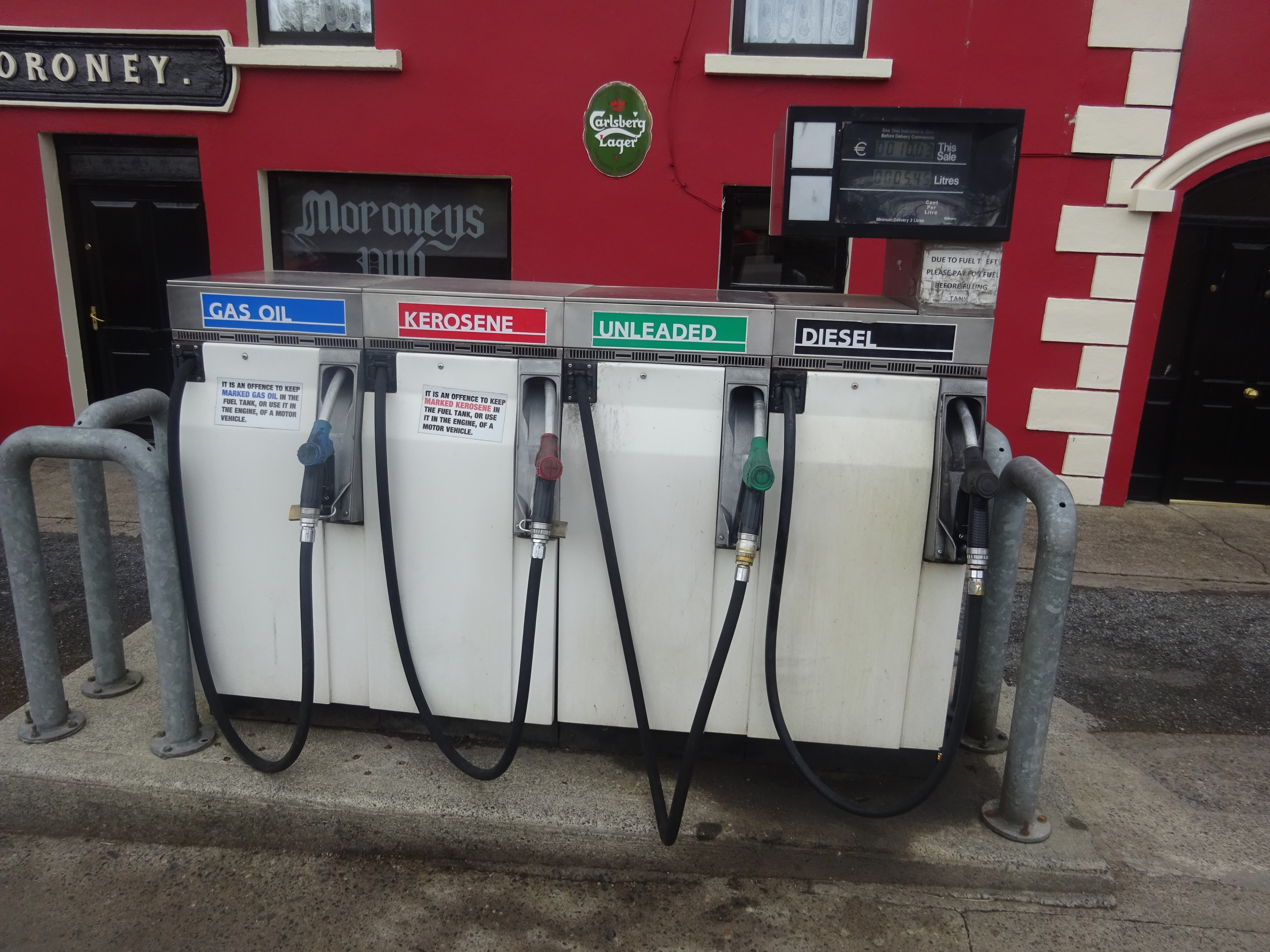
Fuel pumps in Ireland, with green gas oil (Blue sign with the inscription "Gas Oil") and red kerosene, and notices that it is an offence to use marked fuels in a motor vehicle

After August 2002, all European Union countries became obliged to add about 6 mg/L (0.034 oz/bbl) of Solvent Yellow 124, a dye with structure similar to Solvent Yellow 56, to heating fuel. This dye can be easily hydrolyzed with acids, splitting off the acetal group responsible for its solubility in nonpolar solvents, and yielding a water-soluble form. Like a similar methyl orange dye, it changes color to red in acidic pH. It can be easily detected in the fuel at levels as low as 0.3 ppm by extraction to a diluted hydrochloric acid, allowing detection of the red diesel added into motor diesel in amounts as low as 2–3%. With the implementation decision (EU) 2022/197 by the European Commission, ACCUTRACE Plus, developed by Dow Chemical Company, replaced the Euromarker Solvent Yellow 124 dye on 18 January 2024. The new Accutrace dye is significantly more difficult to remove from gas oil than its predecessor. Consequently, the introduction of this new fuel dye is expected to reduce the illegal conversion of gas oil, subject to reduced taxation, into diesel fuel. Accutrace can be detected in trace amounts using gas chromatography, both in laboratory and field settings. Residues from both Accutrace and the previous Euromarker dyes persist in fuel tanks and filters long after the illegal gas oil has been discontinued. Thus, even months after switching to legitimate diesel fuel, traces of illegal gas oil use can still be identified.

=== United Kingdom ===
Motor Spirit (Regulation) Act 1948 (Note: Section 16(1).)
- Act of Parliament
- Parliament of the United Kingdom
- Long title: An Act to create certain offences in connection with the supply and use of motor spirit, and for purposes connected therewith.
- Citation: 11 & 12 Geo. 6. c. 34
- Territorial extent: United Kingdom

Dates
- Royal assent: 28 May 1948
- Commencement: 1 June 1948 (Note: Section 16(2).)
- Repealed: 18 December 1953
Other legislation
Repealed by	Statute Law Revision Act 1953

Status: Repealed

Text of statute as originally enacted

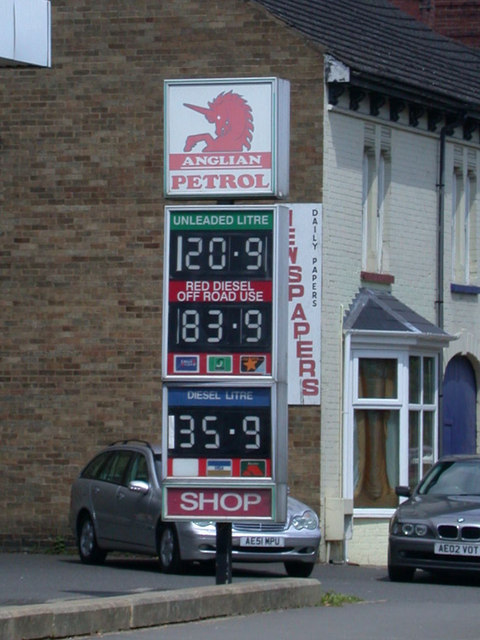
Petrol station in England, with 'red diesel' available for a lower price, but only for "off road use", i.e. agricultural machinery and similar

In the United Kingdom, "red diesel" is dyed gas oil for registered agricultural or construction vehicles such as tractors, excavators, cranes and some other non-road applications such as boats. Red diesel carries a significantly reduced tax levy compared to undyed diesel fuel used in ordinary road vehicles. As red diesel is widely available in the UK, the authorities regularly carry out roadside checks. Unauthorised use incurs heavy fines but despite this, spot checks have occasionally found as many as one in five motorists using red diesel.

Red diesel can also be used in road vehicles which are registered as off-road with the DVLA provided they are only used on private land. On 14 July 2014, the European Commission announced it was referring the United Kingdom to the European Court of Justice over the use of red diesel in propelling private pleasure craft on water. It believed the UK was not properly applying EU regulations for the fiscal marking of fuels.

On 18 November 2014, a new measure to combat fuel laundering was set to result in the illegal trade being "virtually eliminated" in the United Kingdom, according to HM Revenue and Customs. A new dye was introduced in April 2015 in the United Kingdom and the Republic of Ireland.

==== Carbon offset red diesel ====
In 2014, Crown Oil became the first fuel supplier to begin offering their red diesel customers the opportunity to purchase carbon offset red diesel which is marketed as a more environmentally friendly alternative. With the additional costs incurred being used to purchase carbon credits, with projects aimed at lowering carbon emissions around the world, offering businesses a more sustainable way to use red diesel.

=== Finland ===
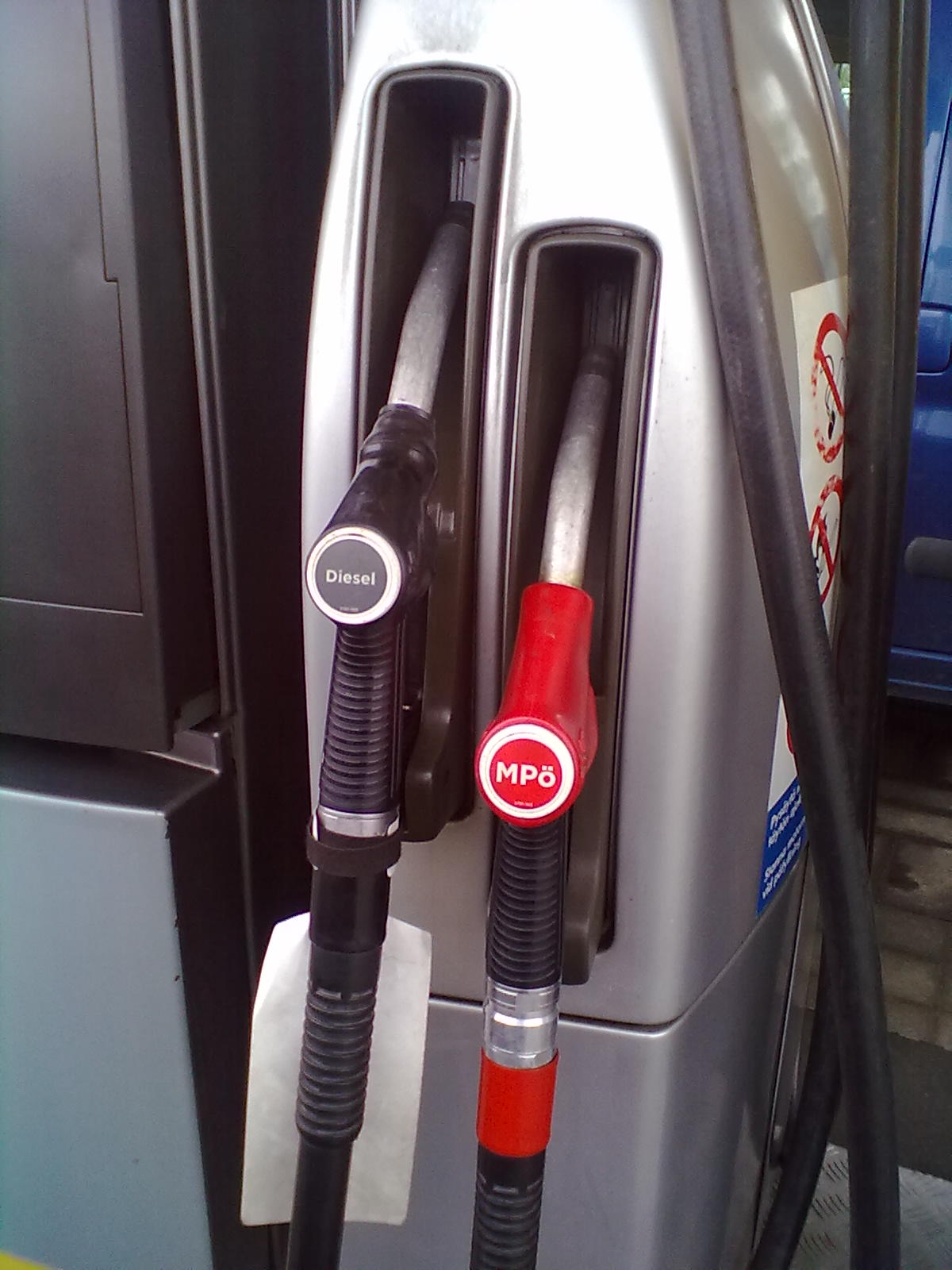
Diesel (black) and dyed fuel oil (MPÖ; red) dispensers at a St1 petrol station in Tornio, Finland

Low-tax dyed fuel oil (Finnish: polttoöljy; Swedish: brännolja; always abbreviated on nozzles as MPÖ) is available in many rural petrol stations in Finland, primarily intended for certain types of non-road vehicles such as tractors and driveable construction vehicles. Until 2002, furfural was used to dye fuel oil in Finland, when it was replaced with Solvent Yellow 124. Since 2008, boats and pleasure craft are no longer legally allowed to use low-tax fuel oil; instead, taxable diesel must be used for fuel.

=== Poland ===
Currently there are no naked-eye visible dyes in car fuels sold in Poland. Previously, during the time of Communist Party rule, the state-owned CPN fuel monopoly dyed leaded gasolines (marketed as "ethilins") in the following colors: 78 – blue, 86 – green, 94 – yellow, 98 – red. Diesel fuel, although unleaded, was also dyed a brown color.

== Fuel dye in North America ==
In the United States of America, the Environmental Protection Agency mandates use of a red dye to identify fuels for off-road use. Solvent Red 26 is used in the United States as a standard, though it is often replaced with Solvent Red 164, which is similar to Solvent Red 26 but with longer alkyl chains. The Internal Revenue Service regulation 26 CFR 48.4082-1 mandates use of the same red dyes, in fivefold concentration, for tax-exempt diesel fuels such as heating oil; their argument for the higher dye content is to allow detection even when diluted with "legal" fuel. Detection of red-dyed fuel in the fuel system of an on-road vehicle will incur substantial penalties.

== Fuel laundering ==
Organised crime gangs may "launder" low-price dyed fuel, removing the dye and selling it illegally to unsuspecting motorists at the higher price of undyed fuel. Paramilitary groups connected to political unrest in Northern Ireland have established laundering plants on both sides of the Irish border. In 2004, Northern Irish police discovered an illegal facility capable of removing the dye from 12 million L (2.6 million imp gal; 3.2 million US gal) per year. In 2009, customs officials shut down a plant capable of removing the dye from 6.5 million litres of fuel per year. In 2011, a plant capable of processing 30 million litres was discovered. The European Union aims to combat fuel laundering with the introduction of the new fuel dye Accutrace starting from 2024.

== Fuel theft ==
Fuel is being dyed by companies such as Bord na Móna in Ireland in an effort to combat the widespread theft of fuel.

== Dyes used by country ==
Some dyes required in some countries are listed here:

Country	Fuel	Dye
Australia	Regular unleaded petrol	undyed – clear to yellow (was purple or brown up to 2013, was red/orange until 2015)
Australia	Premium unleaded petrol	undyed – clear to yellow
Austria	Heating oil	any red dye and Solvent Yellow 124
Canada	Off-road fuel (agriculture, construction, mining etc.)	red/purple dye
Canada	Marine gasoline	any red dye
Canada	Heating oil	any red dye
Finland	Heating oil	Solvent Yellow 124
Finland	Diesel for construction and agriculture	Solvent Yellow 124
France	Diesel (off-road)	Solvent Red 24 and Solvent Yellow 124
France	Heating oil	Solvent Red 24 and Solvent Yellow 124
France	Kerosene as heating fuel	Solvent Yellow 124
France	Marine diesel	Solvent Blue 35
Latvia		Solvent Yellow 124. SIA "Straujupīte" for diesel labeling is using no more than 0.2% of sulfur content. Diesel is labeled by adding one of the coloring matters to 1000 liters of oil products: (N-ethyl-1-(4-fenilazofenilazo) naphthyl-2-amine – at least 5.0 grams;
Latvia	Agricultural diesel	fiscal marker – Solvent Yellow 124, CAS Nr.34432-92-3 – at least 6.0 grams, and no more than 9.0 grams, per 1000 L
Latvia	Agricultural diesel	Solvent Blue 35, CAS no. 17354-14-2, or any other equivalent blue coloring – at least 7.0 grams per 1000 L
Estonia	Heating oil	Automate Red NR or similar
Estonia	Agricultural diesel	Automate Blue 8 GHF or similar
Germany	Heating oil	Solvent Yellow 124 + 4.1 gr/litre Solvent Red 19 or 5.3 gr tolyazotolyazo-ethylhexylbetanaphthylamine or 6.1 gr tolyazotolyazo-tridecylbetanaphthylamine and similar
Greece	Heating oil	any red dye
Greece	Marine diesel	any black dye
Hungary	Heating oil	Ferrocene
India	Subsidised Kerosene	Blue dye
Indonesia	Pertalite (RON 90)	Green dye
Indonesia	PERTAMAX (RON 92)	Blue dye
Indonesia	PERTAMAX Turbo (RON 98)	Red dye
Ireland	Gas oil	green dye = Solvent Yellow 124 and Anthraquinone Blue dye equivalent to Solvent Blue 35 and ACCUTRACE S10 ((3-(sec-butyl)-4-(decyloxy)phenyl)methanetriyl)tribenzene
Ireland	Kerosene	Solvent Red 19, Solvent Yellow 124 and ACCUTRACE S10 ((3-(sec-butyl)-4-(decyloxy)phenyl)methanetriyl)tribenzene
Italy	Heating oil	Solvent Red 161
Italy	Gas oil	Solvent Green 32 or 33 and Solvent Yellow 124
Netherlands	Agricultural diesel	any red dye and Solvent Yellow 124 (the additive Furfural is obsolete)
Norway	Agricultural diesel	any green dye
Portugal	Agricultural diesel	Solvent Blue 35
Portugal	Heating oil	Solvent Red 19 and similar
Saudi Arabia	Gasoline 91	Green dye – introduced to prevent counterfeit sale of gasoline (typically sold as incorrect octane in the past)
Saudi Arabia	Gasoline 95	Red dye – introduced to prevent counterfeit sale of gasoline (typically sold as incorrect octane in the past)
Saudi Arabia	Gasoline 98	Blue dye - dyed blue since the introduction of 98 octane gasoline to the Saudi market in early 2026.
Spain	Agricultural diesel	any red dye + Solvent Yellow 124: Orden PRE/1724/2002 of 5 July.
Spain	Heating oil	any blue dye + Solvent Yellow 124: Orden PRE/1724/2002 of 5 July.
Sweden	Heating oil	Solvent Blue 35, Solvent Blue 79, Solvent Blue 98 and Solvent Yellow 124
Thailand	Gasoline 95	yellow dye
Thailand	Gasoline 91	red dye
United Kingdom	Gas oil ("red diesel")	Solvent Red 24, quinizarin, Solvent Yellow 124 and ((3-(sec-butyl)-4-(decyloxy)phenyl)methanetriyl)tribenzene
United Kingdom	Rebated kerosene	Coumarin, Solvent Yellow 124 and ((3-(sec-butyl)-4-(decyloxy)phenyl)methanetriyl)tribenzene
Europe	many rebated	Solvent Yellow 124 ("Euromarker") Transition commenced to replace this by ButoxyBenzene from 18 January 2024
United States	low-tax fuels, high-sulfur fuels	Solvent Red 26 3.9 lbs per 1000 barrels (11 mg/L), Solvent Red 164
Worldwide	Aviation gasoline 80/87	red dye
Worldwide	Aviation gasoline 82UL	purple dye
Worldwide	Aviation gasoline 100LL	blue dye
Worldwide	Aviation gasoline 100/130	green dye

== See also ==
- Denatured alcohol
