= Solvent Red 26 =

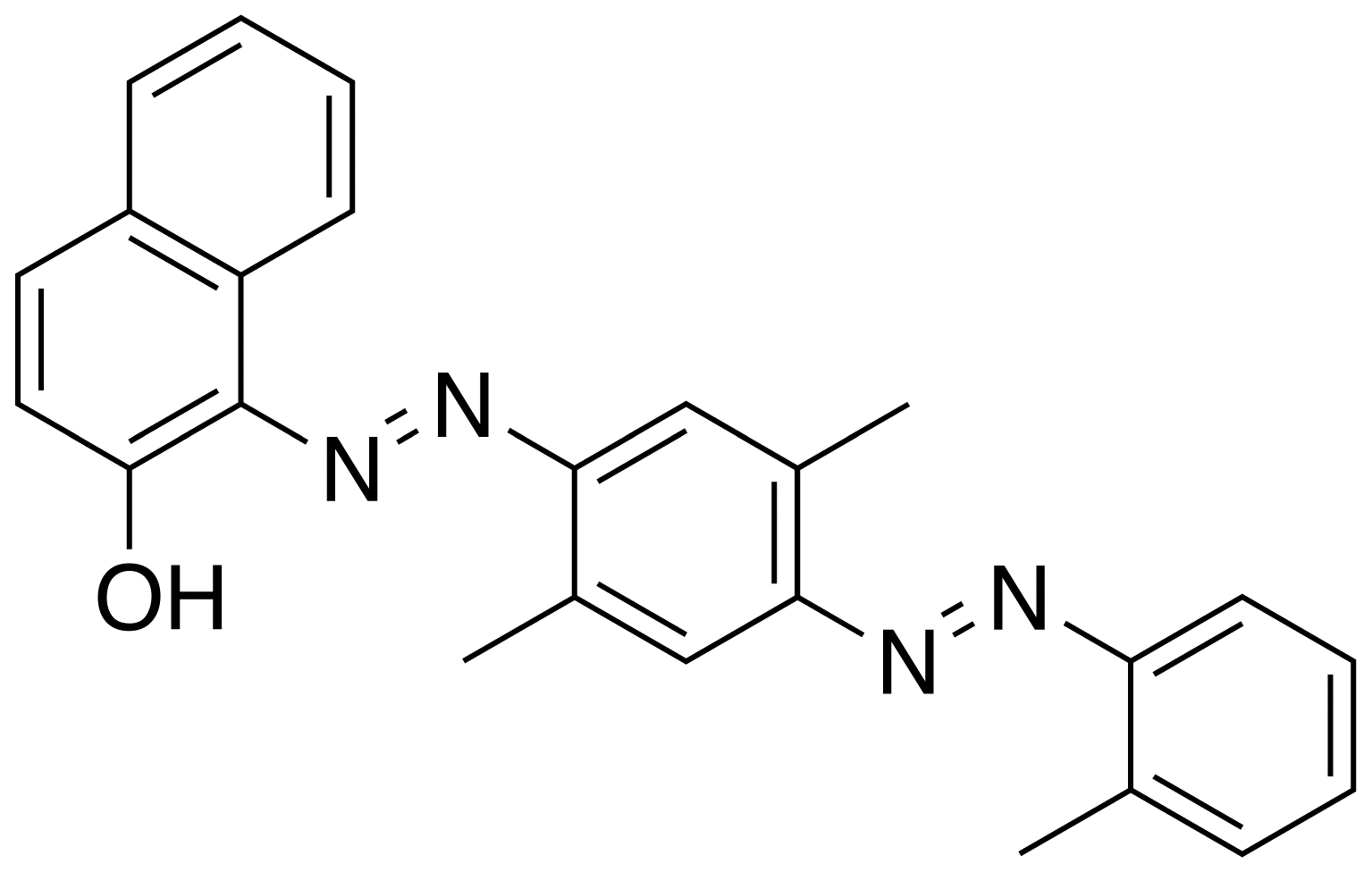

Names
- Other names Oil Red EGN, Benzidine Yellow 10G, Sanyo Pigment Yellow 8105

Identifiers
CAS Number	4477-79-6
3D model (JSmol)	Interactive image
ChEMBL	ChEMBL1966947
ChemSpider	16097342
ECHA InfoCard	100.022.508
EC Number	224-757-3
PubChem CID	62541
UNII	KR6F64FLX3
CompTox Dashboard (EPA)	DTXSID5050395
- InChI: InChI=1S/C25H22N4O/c1-16-8-4-7-11-21(16)26-27-22-14-18(3)23(15-17(22)2)28-29-25-20-10-6-5-9-19(20)12-13-24(25)30/h4-15,30H,1-3H3 Key: NRBKWAQSLYBVSG-UHFFFAOYSA-N
- SMILES: Oc2ccc1ccccc1c2N=Nc3cc(C)c(N=Nc4ccccc4C)cc3C

Properties
Chemical formula	C_{25}H_{22}N_{4}O
Molar mass	394.478 g·mol^{−1}
Appearance	Red solid
Solubility in water	Low

Hazards
- GHS labelling
Pictograms	(GHS07: Exclamation mark) (GHS08: Health hazard)
Signal word	Warning
Hazard statements	H315, H317, H319, H335, H341, H351
Precautionary statements	P201, P202, P261, P264, P271, P272, P280, P281, P302+P352, P304+P340, P305+P351+P338, P308+P313, P312, P321, P332+P313, P333+P313, P337+P313, P362, P363, P403+P233, P405, P501
- Except where otherwise noted, data are given for materials in their standard state (at 25 °C [77 °F], 100 kPa). Infobox references

Solvent Red 26, also known as Oil Red EGN or C.I. 26120, is a purplish red synthetic azo dye. It is soluble in oils and insoluble in water.

Its main use is as a standard fuel dye in the US mandated by the US IRS to distinguish low-taxed or tax exempt heating oil from automotive diesel fuel, and by the EPA to mark fuels with higher sulfur content; it is however increasingly replaced with Solvent Red 164, a similar dye with longer alkyl chains, which is better soluble in hydrocarbons. The concentration required by IRS is a spectral equivalent of 3.9 pounds per 1,000 barrels, or 11.13 mg/L, of Solvent Red 26 in solid form; the concentrations required by EPA are roughly 5 times lower.

== See also ==
- Solvent Red 27
- Solvent Red 164
