= Naphthol =

Naphthol may refer to:

- 1-Naphthol
- 2-Naphthol
