= Oil Red O =

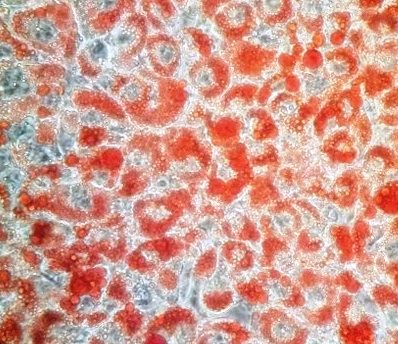
- Differentiated adipocytes in a 3T3-L1 cell line stained with Oil Red O

Names
- IUPAC name 1-(2,5-dimethyl-4-(2,5-dimethylphenyl) phenyldiazenyl) azonapthalen-2-ol

Identifiers
CAS Number	1320-06-5
3D model (JSmol)	Interactive image
ChEBI	CHEBI:88213
ChemSpider	14217961
ECHA InfoCard	100.013.906
MeSH	oil+red+O
PubChem CID	5841742
UNII	G7S71FND9B
CompTox Dashboard (EPA)	DTXSID301039601 DTXSID90889366, DTXSID301039601
- InChI: InChI=1S/C26H24N4O/c1-16-9-10-17(2)22(13-16)27-28-23-14-19(4)24(15-18(23)3)29-30-26-21-8-6-5-7-20(21)11-12-25(26)31/h5-15,31H,1-4H3/b28-27+,30-29+ Key: NPGIHFRTRXVWOY-XOXGWFOHSA-N; InChI=1/C26H24N4O/c1-16-9-10-17(2)22(13-16)27-28-23-14-19(4)24(15-18(23)3)29-30-26-21-8-6-5-7-20(21)11-12-25(26)31/h5-15,31H,1-4H3/b28-27+,30-29+ Key: NPGIHFRTRXVWOY-XOXGWFOHBH
- SMILES: Cc4cc(/N=N/c1cc(C)c(cc1C)/N=N/c2c3ccccc3ccc2O)c(C)cc4

Properties
Chemical formula	C_{26}H_{24}N_{4}O
Molar mass	408.49496
- Except where otherwise noted, data are given for materials in their standard state (at 25 °C [77 °F], 100 kPa). verify (what is ?) Infobox references

Oil Red O (Solvent Red 27, Sudan Red 5B, C.I. 26125, C_{26}H_{24}N_{4}O) is a lysochrome (fat-soluble dye) diazo dye used for staining of neutral triglycerides and lipids on frozen sections and some lipoproteins on paraffin sections. It has the appearance of a red powder with an absorbance maximum at 518 nanometers.

== Uses ==
Oil Red O is one of the dyes used for Sudan staining. Similar dyes include Sudan III, Sudan IV, and Sudan Black B. The staining has to be performed on fresh samples, as alcohol fixation removes most lipids. Oil Red O largely replaced Sudan III and Sudan IV, as it provides much deeper red color and the stains are therefore much easier to see.

Oil Red O can be used to mark lipid-containing vacuoles, particularly in cases of acute lymphoblastic leukemia or Burkitt's lymphoma. It can also be used to stain liver sections for histological analysis, quantify cell lipid content, and to stain the aorta to examine lesions from atherosclerosis.

In pyrotechnics, Oil Red O is used in some compositions of red colored smokes.

== Forensic ==
When staining, Oil Red O can make fat more visible in various cuts in pathology.

It is also used in a technique (the method is called as the dye: Oil Red O), discovered in 2004 by Alexandre Beaudoin, for staining latent fingerprints. This technique allows the development of latent fingerprints on porous exhibits (such as paper, cardboard, etc.) that are dry or wet.

It mainly targets fat deposits on the surface of porous exhibits. It is a non-destructive technique (which does not destroy the exhibit nor prevents the use of other techniques).

It is a safe alternative to the Physical Developer method, and is also used in sequence with other methods of fingerprints development.
