= Solvent Yellow 124 =

Names
- IUPAC name N-Ethyl-N-[2-[1-(2-methylpropoxy)ethoxy]ethyl]-4-phenyldiazenylaniline
- Other names SY124; Sudan 455; Somalia Yellow; T10 Yellow LBN; C.I. 111155

Identifiers
CAS Number	34432-92-3
3D model (JSmol)	Interactive image
ChemSpider	105606
ECHA InfoCard	100.047.277
PubChem CID	118170
UNII	E880XYT70P
CompTox Dashboard (EPA)	DTXSID60865718
- InChI: InChI=1S/C22H31N3O2/c1-5-25(15-16-26-19(4)27-17-18(2)3)22-13-11-21(12-14-22)24-23-20-9-7-6-8-10-20/h6-14,18-19H,5,15-17H2,1-4H3/b24-23+ Key: BATVZJPOLFSGTD-WCWDXBQESA-N; InChI=1/C22H31N3O2/c1-5-25(15-16-26-19(4)27-17-18(2)3)22-13-11-21(12-14-22)24-23-20-9-7-6-8-10-20/h6-14,18-19H,5,15-17H2,1-4H3/b24-23+ Key: BATVZJPOLFSGTD-WCWDXBQEBJ
- SMILES: N(=N/c1ccc(N(CCOC(OCC(C)C)C)CC)cc1)\c2ccccc2

Properties
Chemical formula	C_{22}H_{31}N_{3}O_{2}
Molar mass	369.509 g·mol^{−1}
Density	1.02 g/m^{3}
Boiling point	488.9 ºC

Hazards
- GHS labelling
Pictograms	(GHS07: Exclamation mark) (GHS08: Health hazard) (GHS09: Environmental hazard)
Signal word	Danger
Hazard statements	H220 H302 H317 H361 H373
Precautionary statements	P203 P260 P261 P270 P272 P273 P280 P301+P317 P302+P352 P318 P319 P321 P330 P333+P317 P362+P364 P391 P405 P501
NFPA 704 (fire diamond)	0 1 0
Flash point	249.5 °C (481.1 °F; 522.6 K)
Safety data sheet (SDS)	Echemi
- Except where otherwise noted, data are given for materials in their standard state (at 25 °C [77 °F], 100 kPa). verify (what is ?) Infobox references

Solvent Yellow 124 is a yellow azo dye used in European Union as a fuel dye. It is a marker used since August 2002 to distinguish diesel fuel intended for heating from a higher-taxed motor diesel fuel. It is added to fuels not intended for motor vehicles in amounts of 6 mg/L or 7 mg/kg under the name Euromarker.

== Euromarker ==
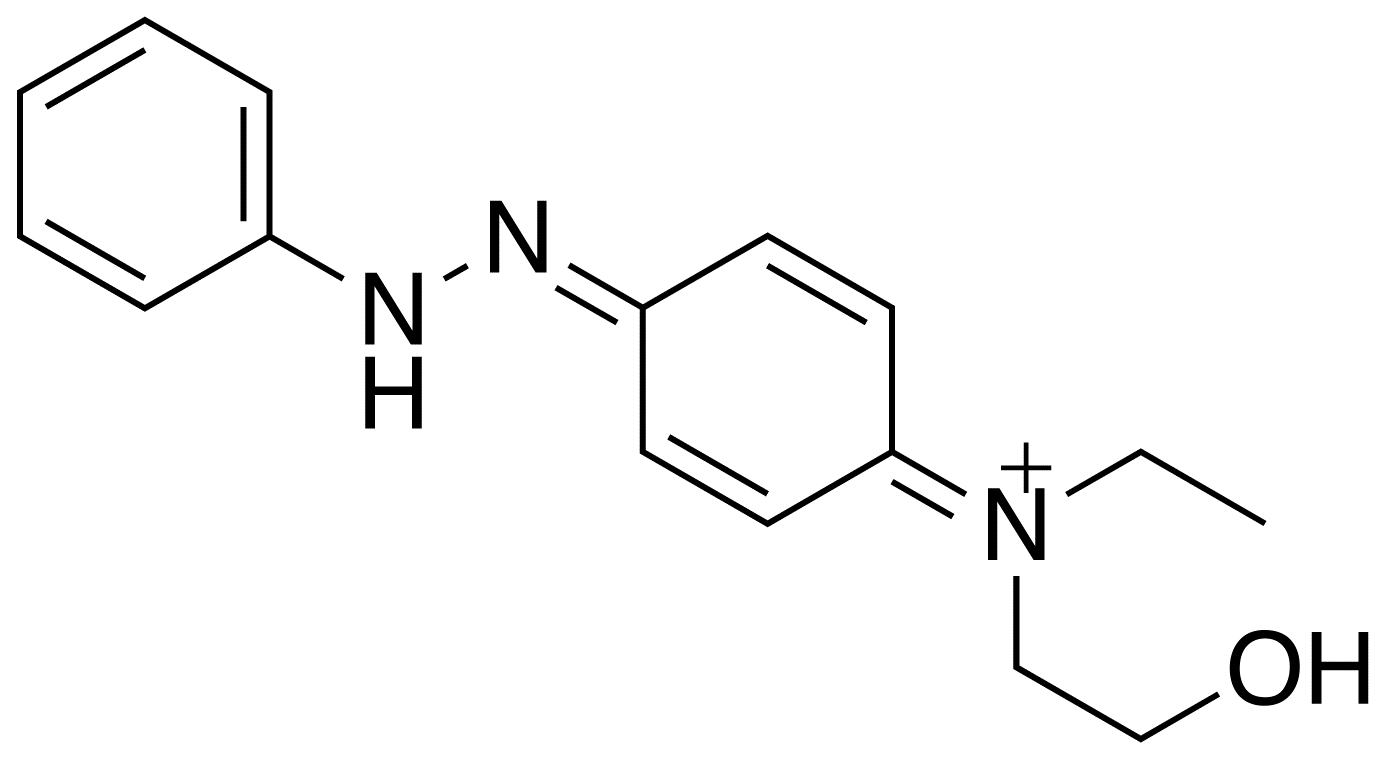
Solvent Yellow 124, hydrolyzed protonated form

Solvent Yellow 124 is a dye with structure similar to Solvent Yellow 56. This dye can be easily hydrolyzed with acids, splitting off the acetal group responsible for its solubility in nonpolar solvents, and yielding a water-soluble form which is easy to extract to water. Like a similar methyl orange dye, it changes color to red in acidic pH. It can be easily detected in the fuel at levels as low as 0.3 ppm by extraction to a diluted hydrochloric acid, allowing detection of the red diesel added into motor diesel in amounts as low as 2-3%.

Solvent Yellow 124 is intended to be difficult to remove from the fuel in an economical way. The Customs, familiar with various tricks including dual fuel systems with hidden fuel tanks, will take samples from the fuel lines to the engine itself if such equipment is suspected in the car.

As the amount of Solvent Yellow 124 added to the fuel is known, by measuring its content in the fuel it is possible to calculate how much of the low-taxed fuel was added to the legal one.

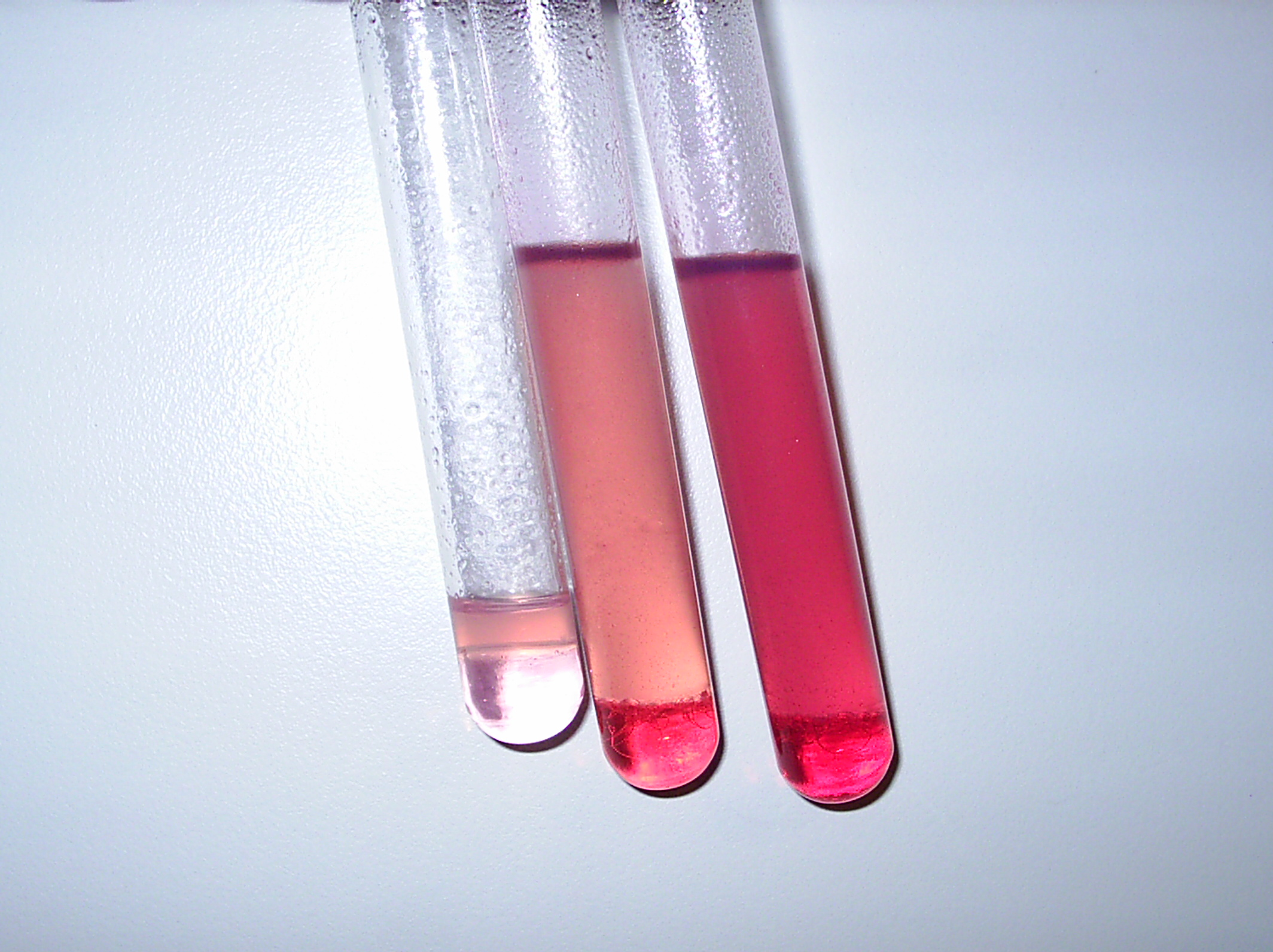
Heating oil detection in Diesel fuel

== Concerns ==
The UK government expressed concerns about the possibility of "laundering" the dye out of "illicit" fuel, hampering the detection. Denmark expressed concerns about the dye's toxicity.

Euromarker is intended to be replaced later by newer technology markers, such as biological markers or fuel markers with non-destructive analytical methods. These are all special chemicals tailored for the individual products, and perhaps even for individual refineries, allowing the identification of the source of the material by its content of the molecular markers.

In 2014, a new fuel marker more resistant to removal was announced for the United Kingdom.
