= Sudan II =

Names
- IUPAC name 1-(2,4-Dimethylphenylazo)-2-naphthol
- Other names see text

Identifiers
CAS Number	3118-97-6
3D model (JSmol)	Interactive image
ChemSpider	13621577
ECHA InfoCard	100.019.537
KEGG	C19526
PubChem CID	18386
UNII	8C1M5O3ECT
CompTox Dashboard (EPA)	DTXSID80859795 DTXSID5040706, DTXSID80859795
- InChI: InChI=1S/C18H16N2O/c1-12-7-9-16(13(2)11-12)19-20-18-15-6-4-3-5-14(15)8-10-17(18)21/h3-11,21H,1-2H3/b20-19+ Key: JBTHDAVBDKKSRW-FMQUCBEESA-N; InChI=1/C18H16N2O/c1-12-7-9-16(13(2)11-12)19-20-18-15-6-4-3-5-14(15)8-10-17(18)21/h3-11,21H,1-2H3/b20-19+ Key: JBTHDAVBDKKSRW-FMQUCBEEBZ
- SMILES: Cc3ccc(/N=N/c1c2ccccc2ccc1O)c(C)c3

Properties
Chemical formula	C_{18}H_{16}N_{2}O
Molar mass	276.339 g·mol^{−1}
Melting point	156 to 158 °C (313 to 316 °F; 429 to 431 K)
- Except where otherwise noted, data are given for materials in their standard state (at 25 °C [77 °F], 100 kPa). verify (what is ?) Infobox references

Sudan II (Solvent Orange 7, C.I. 12140, C_{18}H_{16}N_{2}O) is a lysochrome (fat-soluble dye) azo dye used for staining of triglycerides in frozen sections, and some protein bound lipids and lipoproteins on paraffin sections. It has the appearance of red powder with melting point 156–158 °C and maximum absorption at 493(420) nm.

== Uses ==
In industry, it is used to color nonpolar substances like oils, fats, waxes, greases, various hydrocarbon products, and acrylic emulsions.

It was used as food dye under the designation FD&C Red 32 in the US until the FDA banned its use in food in 1956 due to toxicity.
