= Sudan III =

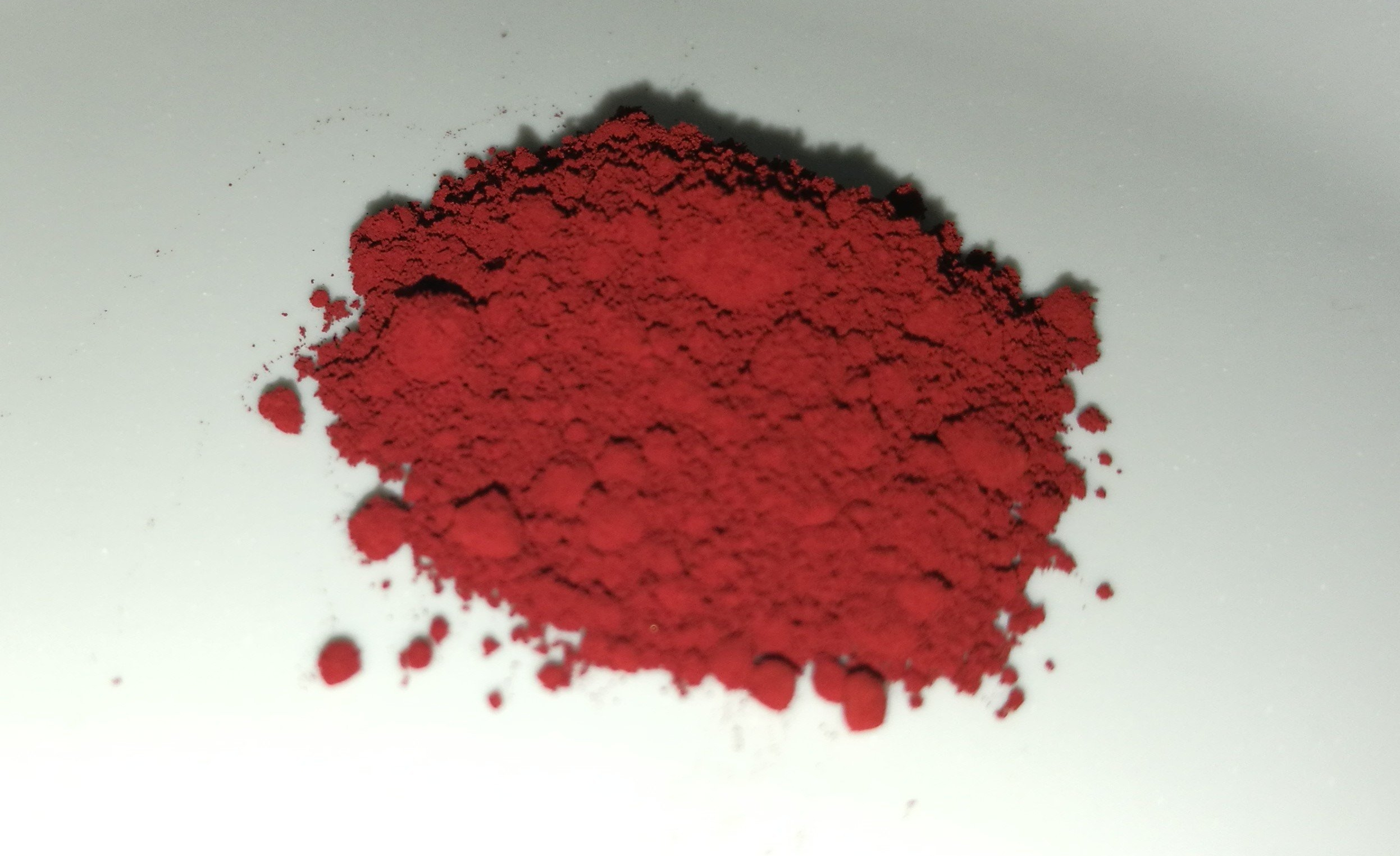
- A sample of dye Sudan III

- Sudan III

Names
- Preferred IUPAC name 1-{[4-(Phenyldiazenyl)phenyl]diazenyl}naphthalen-2-ol
- Other names Sudan Red BK, Fat Ponceau G, Cerasin Red, C.I. 26100, Solvent Red 23, Solvent Red 164, Sudan Red, Sudan Red III, Sudan V, Sudan Red B, Sudan G, Scarlet B, and Tony Red

Identifiers
CAS Number	85-86-9
3D model (JSmol)	Interactive image
ChEBI	CHEBI:82535
ChEMBL	ChEMBL2001927
ChemSpider	16736189
ECHA InfoCard	100.001.490
KEGG	C19527
PubChem CID	62331
UNII	ND733RX3JN
CompTox Dashboard (EPA)	DTXSID3041742
- InChI: InChI=1S/C22H16N4O/c27-21-15-10-16-6-4-5-9-20(16)22(21)26-25-19-13-11-18(12-14-19)24-23-17-7-2-1-3-8-17/h1-15,27H/b24-23-,26-25+ Key: FHNINJWBTRXEBC-HXEHWPEMSA-N; InChI=1/C22H16N4O/c27-21-15-10-16-6-4-5-9-20(16)22(21)26-25-19-13-11-18(12-14-19)24-23-17-7-2-1-3-8-17/h1-15,27H/b24-23-,26-25+ Key: FHNINJWBTRXEBC-HXEHWPEMBU
- SMILES: Oc4ccc1ccccc1c4/N=N/c3ccc(\N=N/c2ccccc2)cc3

Properties
Chemical formula	C_{22}H_{16}N_{4}O
Molar mass	352.397 g·mol^{−1}
Melting point	199 °C (390 °F; 472 K)

Hazards
- GHS labelling
Pictograms	(GHS05: Corrosive) (GHS07: Exclamation mark)
Signal word	Warning
Hazard statements	H315, H318, H319, H335, H413
Precautionary statements	P101, P102, P103, P261, P264, P270, P271, P273, P280, P302+P352, P304+P340, P305+P351+P338, P310, P312, P321, P332+P313, P337+P313, P362, P403+P233, P405, P501
Safety data sheet (SDS)	Sigma-Aldrich Sudan III
- Except where otherwise noted, data are given for materials in their standard state (at 25 °C [77 °F], 100 kPa). verify (what is ?) Infobox references

Sudan III is a lysochrome (fat-soluble dye) diazo dye. It is structurally related to azobenzene.

== Uses ==
It is used to color nonpolar substances such as oils, fats, waxes, greases, various hydrocarbon products, and acrylic emulsions. Its main use is as a fuel dye in the United States mandated by the Internal Revenue Service (IRS) to distinguish low-taxed heating oil from automotive diesel fuel, and by the United States Environmental Protection Agency (EPA) to mark fuels with higher sulfur content; it is a replacement for Solvent Red 26 with better solubility in hydrocarbons. The IRS requires "a concentration spectrally equivalent to at least 3.9 pounds of... Solvent Red 26 per thousand barrels of fuel" (11.1 mg/L); the concentrations required by EPA are roughly 5 times lower. It should be stored at room temperature.

=== Biological staining ===
Sudan III is a dye used for Sudan staining. Similar dyes include Oil Red O, Sudan IV, and Sudan Black B. They are used for staining of triglycerides in frozen sections, and some protein bound lipids and lipoproteins on paraffin sections. It has the appearance of reddish brown crystals and a maximum absorption at 507(304) nm. It has a more orange shade than Oil Red O, lending to its less popular status. In botany, it is used with Light Green SF Yellowish to differentiate between suberized and cutinized plant tissue.
