= Triglyceride =

Any ester of glycerol having all three hydroxyl groups esterified with fatty acids

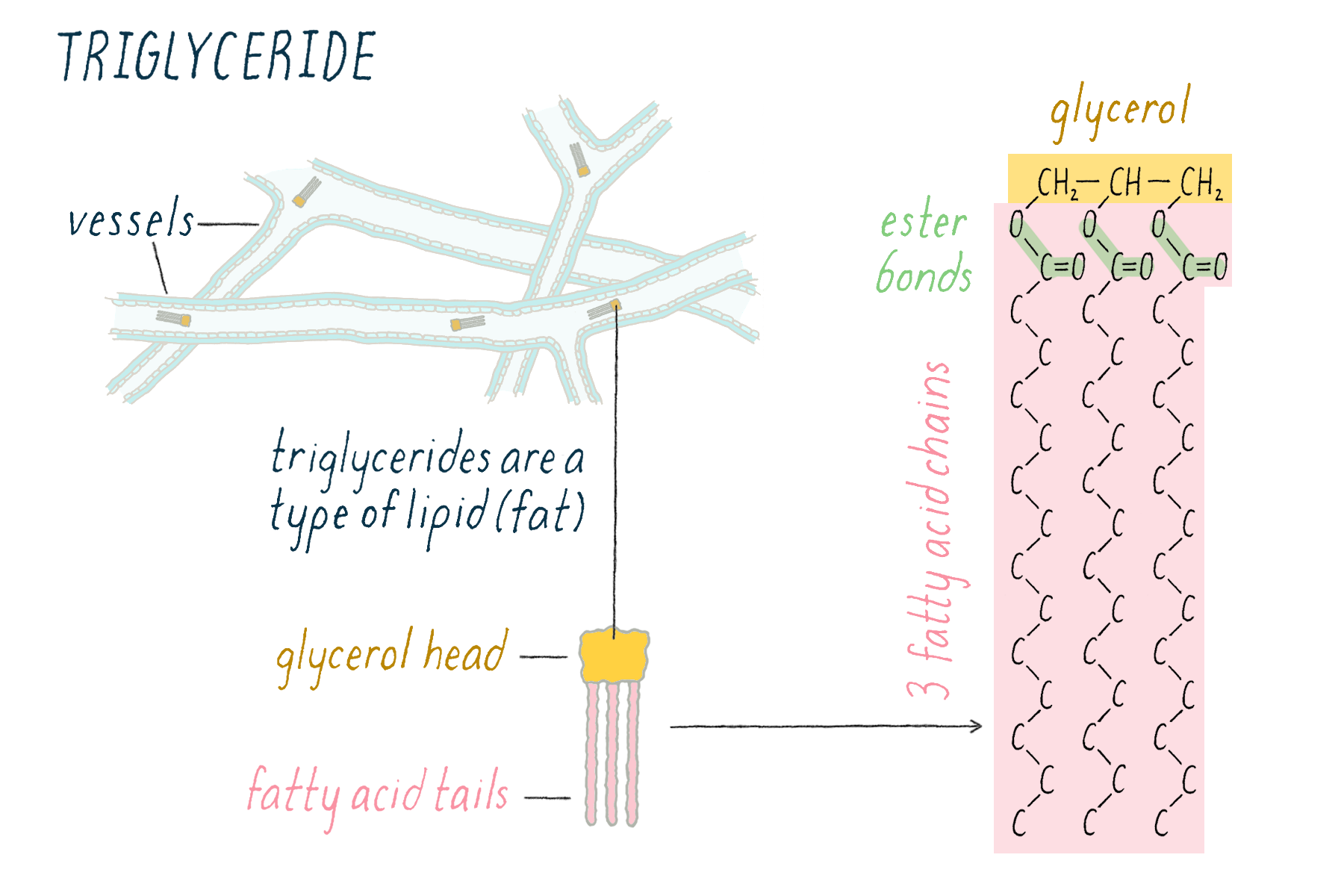
A triglyceride is a type of fat (lipid) found in the blood

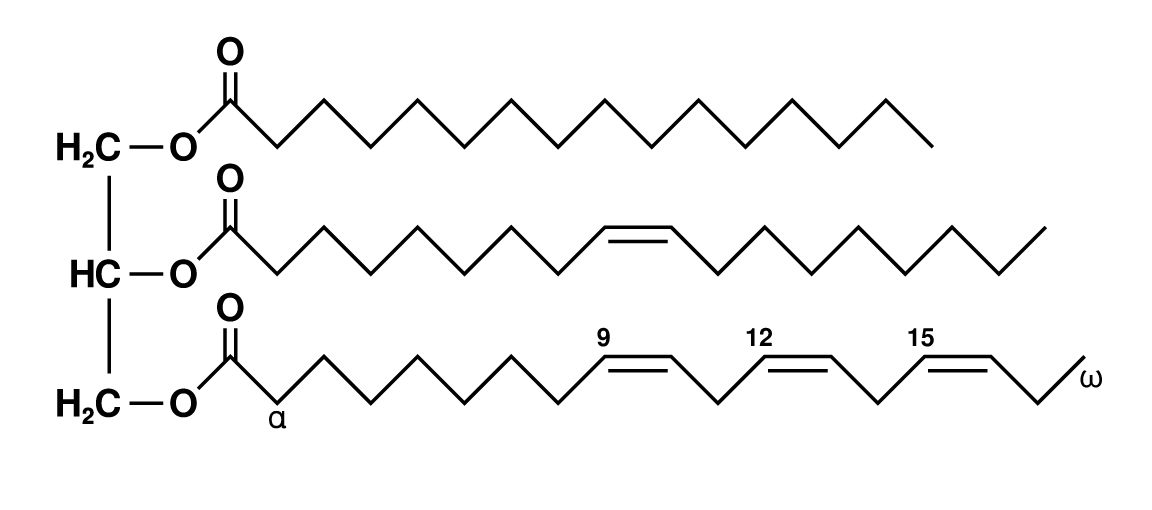
Example of an unsaturated fat triglyceride (C_{55}H_{98}O_{6}). Left part: glycerol; right part, from top to bottom: palmitic acid, oleic acid, alpha-linolenic acid.

A triglyceride (from tri- and glyceride; also TG, triacylglycerol, TAG, or triacylglyceride) is an ester derived from glycerol and three fatty acids. Triglycerides are the main constituents of body fat in humans and other vertebrates as well as vegetable fat. They are also present in the blood to enable the bidirectional transference of adipose fat and blood glucose from the liver and are a major component of human skin oils.

Many types of triglycerides exist. One specific classification focuses on saturated and unsaturated types. Saturated fats have no C=C groups; unsaturated fats feature one or more C=C groups. Unsaturated fats tend to have a lower melting point than saturated analogues; as a result, they are often liquid at room temperature.

== Chemical structure ==
Example of a natural mixed triglyceride with residues of three different fatty acids. The first fatty acid residue is saturated (blue highlighted), the second fatty acid residue contains one double bond within the carbon chain (green highlighted). The third fatty acid residue (a polyunsaturated fatty acid residue, highlighted in red) contains three double bonds within the carbon chain. All carbon-carbon double bonds shown are cis isomers.

The three fatty acids substituents can be the same, but they are usually different. The positions of the three fatty acids are specified using stereospecific numbering as sn-1, sn-2, and sn-3. The compositions of many fats and oils have been determined. Many triglycerides are known because many fatty acids are known. The chain lengths of the fatty acid groups vary in naturally occurring triglycerides. Those containing 16, 18, or 20 carbon atoms are defined as long-chain triglycerides, while medium-chain triglycerides contain shorter fatty acids. Animals synthesize even-numbered fatty acids, but bacteria possess the ability to synthesise odd- and branched-chain fatty acids. As a result, ruminant animal fat contains odd-numbered fatty acids, such as 15, due to the action of bacteria in the rumen. Many fatty acids are unsaturated; some are polyunsaturated (e.g., those derived from linoleic acid).

Most natural fats contain a complex mixture of individual triglycerides. Because of their heterogeneity, they melt over a broad range of temperatures. Cocoa butter is unusual in that it is composed of only a few triglycerides, derived from palmitic, oleic, and stearic acids in the 1-, 2-, and 3-positions of glycerol, respectively.

The simplest triglycerides are those where the three fatty acids are identical. Their names indicate the fatty acid: stearin derived from stearic acid, triolein derived from oleic acid, palmitin derived from palmitic acid, etc. These compounds can be obtained in three crystalline forms (polymorphs): α, β, and β′, the three forms differing in their melting points.

A triglyceride containing different fatty acids is known as a mixed triglyceride. These are more common in nature.

If all three fatty acids on the glycerol differ, then the mixed triglyceride is chiral.

== Physical properties ==
Triglycerides are colorless, although degraded samples can appear yellowish. Stearin, a simple, saturated, symmetrical triglyceride, is a solid near room temperature, but most examples are oils. Their densities range from around 0.89 with very long-chain fatty acids, through about 0.93 to 0.98 with medium-chain, and above 1.0 for very-short-chain acids.

== Biosynthesis ==
Triglycerides are tri-esters derived from the condensation reaction of glycerol with three fatty acids. Their formation can be summarised by the following overall equation:

CH(OH)(CH_{2}OH)_{2} + RCOOH + R'COOH + R"COOH → RC(O)OCH_{2}−CH(OC(O)R')−CH_{2}C(O)OR" + 3H_{2}O

In nature, the formation of triglycerides is not random; rather, specific fatty acids are selectively condensed with the hydroxyl functional groups of glycerol. Animal fats typically have unsaturated fatty acid residues on carbon atoms 1 and 3. Extreme examples of non-random fats are cocoa butter (mentioned above) and lard, which contains about 20% triglyceride with palmitic acid on carbon 2 and oleic acid on carbons 1 and 3. An early step in the biosynthesis is the formation of the glycerol-1-phosphate:

CH(OH)(CH_{2}OH)_{2} + H_{2}PO^{−}_{4} → HOCH_{2}−CH(OH)−CH_{2}−OPO_{3}H^{−} + H_{2}O

The three oxygen atoms in this phosphate ester are differentiated, setting the stage for regiospecific formation of triglycerides, as the diol reacts selectively with coenzyme-A derivatives of the fatty acids, RC(O)S–CoA:

HOCH_{2}−CH(OH)−CH_{2}−OPO_{3}H^{−} + RC(O)S−CoA + R'C(O)S−CoA → RC(O)O−CH_{2}−CH(−OC(O)R')−CH_{2}−OPO_{3}H^{−} + 2HS−CoA

The phosphate ester linkage is then hydrolysed to make way for the introduction of a third fatty acid ester:

RC(O)O−CH_{2}−CH(−OC(O)R')−CH_{2}−OPO_{3}H^{−} + H_{2}O → RC(O)O−CH_{2}−CH(−OC(O)R')−CH_{2}OH + H_{2}PO^{−}_{4}

RC(O)O−CH_{2}−CH(−OC(O)R')−CH_{2}OH + R"C(O)S−CoA → RC(O)O−CH_{2}−CH(−OC(O)R')−CH_{2}−OC(O)R" + HS−CoA

== Nomenclature ==
=== Common fat names ===
Fats are often named after their source, e.g., olive oil, cod liver oil, shea butter, tail fat. Some have traditional names of their own, e.g., butter, lard, ghee, and margarine. The composition of these natural fats is somewhat variable. The oleic acid component in olive oil can vary from 64% to 86%.

=== Chemical fatty acid names ===
Triglycerides are then commonly named as esters of those acids, as in glyceryl 1,2-dioleate 3-palmitate, the name for a brood pheromone of the honey bee. Where the fatty acid residues in a triglyceride are all the same, names like olein (for glyceryl trioleate) and palmitin (for glyceryl tripalmitate) are common.

=== IUPAC ===
In the International Union of Pure and Applied Chemistry's (IUPAC's) general chemical nomenclature for organic compounds, any organic structure can be named by starting from its corresponding hydrocarbon and then specifying differences so as to describe its structure completely. For fatty acids, for example, the position and orientation of carbon-carbon double bonds is specified counting from the carboxyl functional group. Thus, oleic acid is formally named (9Z)-octadec-9-enoic acid, which describes that the compound has:

- an 18 carbon chain ("octadec-") with the carbon of the carboxyl ("-oic acid") given the number 1
- all carbon-carbon bonds are single except for the double bond then joins carbon 9 ("9-en") to carbon 10
- the chain connects to each of the carbons of the double bond on the same side (hence, cis, or "(9Z)"—the "Z" being an abbreviation for the German word zusammen, meaning together).

IUPAC nomenclature can also handle branched chains and derivatives where hydrogen atoms are replaced by other chemical groups. Triglycerides take formal IUPAC names according to the rule governing naming of esters. For example, the formal name propane-1,2,3-triyl 1,2-bis((9Z)-octadec-9-enoate) 3-(hexadecanoate) applies to the pheromone informally named as glyceryl 1,2-dioleate-3-palmitate, and also known by other common names including 1,2-dioleoyl-3-palmitoylglycerol, glycerol dioleate palmitate, and 3-palmito-1,2-diolein.

=== Fatty acid code ===
A notation specific for fatty acids with unbranched chain, that is as precise as the IUPAC one but easier to parse, is a code of the form "{N}:{D} cis-{CCC} trans-{TTT}", where {N} is the number of carbons (including the carboxyl one), {D} is the number of double bonds, {CCC} is a list of the positions of the cis double bonds, and {TTT} is a list of the positions of the trans bonds. Either or both cis and trans lists and their labels are omitted if there are no multiple bonds with that geometry. For example, the codes for stearic, oleic, elaidic, and vaccenic acids are "18:0", "18:1 cis-9", "18:1 trans-9", and "18:1 trans-11", respectively. Catalpic acid, (9E,11E,13Z)-octadeca-9,11,13-trienoic acid according to IUPAC nomenclature, has the code "18:3 cis-13 trans-9,11".

== Saturated and unsaturated fats ==
For human nutrition, an important classification of fats is based on the number and position of double bonds in the constituent fatty acids. Saturated fat has a predominance of saturated fatty acids, without any double bonds, while unsaturated fat has predominantly unsaturated acids with double bonds. (The names refer to the fact that each double bond means two fewer hydrogen atoms in the chemical formula. Thus, a saturated fatty acid, having no double bonds, has the maximum number of hydrogen atoms for a given number of carbon atoms – that is, it is "saturated" with hydrogen atoms.)

Unsaturated fatty acids are further classified into monounsaturated (MUFAs), with a single double bond, and polyunsaturated (PUFAs), with two or more. Natural fats usually contain several different saturated and unsaturated acids, even on the same molecule. For example, in most vegetable oils, the saturated palmitic (C16:0) and stearic (C18:0) acid residues are usually attached to positions 1 and 3 (sn1 and sn3) of the glycerol hub, whereas the middle position (sn2) is usually occupied by an unsaturated one, such as oleic (C18:1, ω–9) or linoleic (C18:2, ω–6).)

Stearic acid (saturated, C18:0)

Palmitoleic acid (mono-unsaturated, C16:1 cis-9, omega-7)

Oleic acid (mono-unsaturated, C18:1 cis-9, omega-9)

α-Linolenic acid (polyunsaturated, C18:3 cis-9,12,15, omega-3)

γ-Linolenic acid (polyunsaturated, C18:3 cis-6,9,12, omega-6)

Saturated fats generally have a higher melting point than unsaturated ones with the same molecular weight, and thus are more likely to be solid at room temperature. For example, the animal fats tallow and lard are high in saturated fatty acid content and are solids. Olive and linseed oils on the other hand are unsaturated and liquid. Unsaturated fats are prone to oxidation by air, which causes them to become rancid and inedible.

The double bonds in unsaturated fats can be converted into single bonds by reaction with hydrogen effected by a catalyst. This process, called hydrogenation, is used to turn vegetable oils into solid or semisolid vegetable fats like margarine, which can substitute for tallow and butter and (unlike unsaturated fats) resist rancidification. Under some conditions, hydrogenation can create some unwanted trans acids from cis acids.

In cellular metabolism, unsaturated fat molecules yield slightly less energy (i.e., fewer calories) than an equivalent amount of saturated fat. The heats of combustion of saturated, mono-, di-, and tri-unsaturated 18-carbon fatty acid esters have been measured as 2859, 2828, 2794, and 2750 kcal/mol, respectively; or, on a weight basis, 10.75, 10.71, 10.66, and 10.58 kcal/g – a decrease of about 0.6% for each additional double bond.

The greater the degree of unsaturation in a fatty acid (i.e., the more double bonds in the fatty acid) the more vulnerable it is to lipid peroxidation (rancidity). Antioxidants can protect unsaturated fat from lipid peroxidation.

== Commercial applications ==
While it is the nutritional aspects of polyunsaturated fatty acids that are generally of greatest interest, these materials also have non-food applications.

Linseed oil and related oils are important components of useful products used in oil paints and related coatings. Linseed oil is rich in di- and tri-unsaturated fatty acid components, which tend to harden in the presence of oxygen. This heat-producing hardening process is peculiar to these so-called drying oils. It is caused by a polymerization process that begins with oxygen molecules attacking the carbon backbone. Aside from linseed oil, other oils exhibit drying properties and are used in more specialized applications. These include tung, poppyseed, perilla, and walnut oil. All "polymerize" on exposure to oxygen to form solid films, useful in paints and varnishes.

Triglycerides can also be split into methyl esters of the constituent fatty acids via transesterification:

RCO_{2}CH(CH_{2}O_{2}CR')(CH_{2}O_{2}CR) + 3 CH_{3}OH → RCO_{2}CH_{3} + R'CO_{2}CH_{3} + RCO_{2}CH_{3} + HOCH(CH_{2}OH)_{2}

The resulting fatty acid methyl esters can be used as fuel in diesel engines, hence their name biodiesel.

== Staining ==
Staining for fatty acids, triglycerides, lipoproteins, and other lipids is done through the use of lysochromes (fat-soluble dyes). These dyes can allow the qualification of a certain fat of interest by staining the material a specific color. Some examples: Sudan IV, Oil Red O, and Sudan Black B.

== Interactive pathway map ==
Click on genes, proteins and metabolites below to link to respective articles. (Note: The interactive pathway map can be edited at WikiPathways: "Statin_Pathway_WP430".)

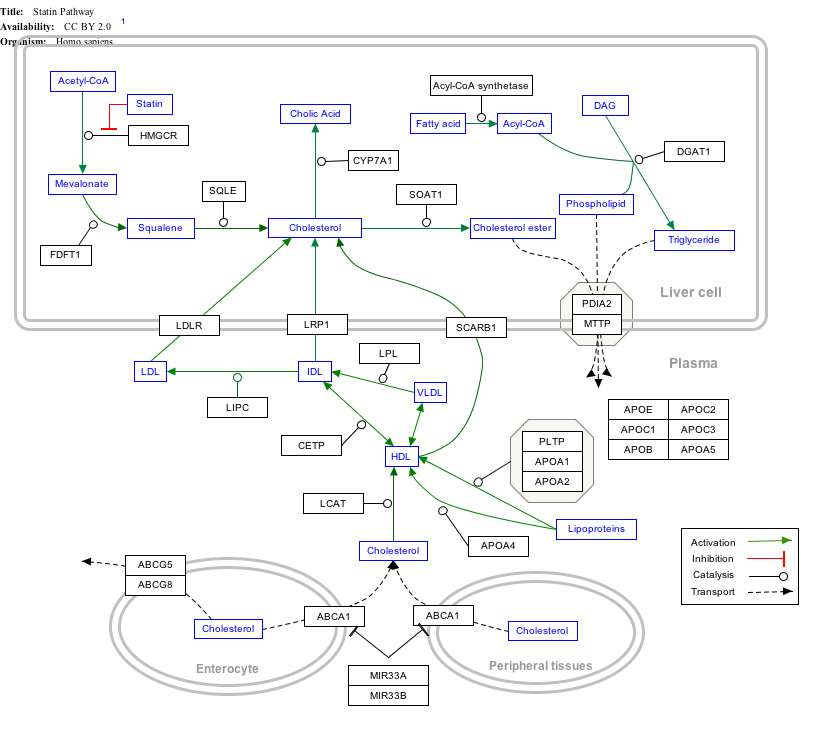

Statin pathway edit

== See also ==
- Diglyceride acyltransferase, an enzyme that produces triglycerides
- Glycerol-3-phosphate acyltransferases, enzymes involved in early step in biosynthesis of triglycerides
- Hypertriglyceridemia, the presence of high amounts of triglycerides in the blood.
- Lipid profile
- Lipids
- Medium-chain triglycerides
- Phosphatidic acids, playing a role in biosynthesis of triglycerides
- Vertical auto profile
