= Sudan IV =

Names
- Preferred IUPAC name 1-[{2-Methyl-4-[(2-methylphenyl)diazenyl]phenyl}diazenyl]naphthalen-2-ol
- Other names 1-{2-Methyl-4-[(2-methylphenyl)diazenyl]phenyl}azonaphthalen-2-ol; Sudan R, C.I. Solvent Red 24, C.I. 26105, Lipid Crimson, Oil Red, Oil Red BB, Fat Red B, Oil Red IV, Scarlet Red, Scarlet Red N.F, Scarlet Red Scharlach, Scarlet R

Identifiers
CAS Number	85-83-6
3D model (JSmol)	Interactive image
ChEBI	CHEBI:88014
ChEMBL	ChEMBL1707454
ChemSpider	11252033
ECHA InfoCard	100.001.487
EC Number	201-635-8
KEGG	C19520
PubChem CID	62330
UNII	I35E9QU96C
CompTox Dashboard (EPA)	DTXSID8041743
- InChI: InChI=1S/C24H20N4O/c1-16-7-3-6-10-21(16)26-25-19-12-13-22(17(2)15-19)27-28-24-20-9-5-4-8-18(20)11-14-23(24)29/h3-15,29H,1-2H3/b26-25+,28-27+ Key: RCTGMCJBQGBLKT-PAMTUDGESA-N; InChI=1S/C24H20N4O/c1-16-7-3-6-10-21(16)26-25-19-12-13-22(17(2)15-19)27-28-24-20-9-5-4-8-18(20)11-14-23(24)29/h3-15,29H,1-2H3/b26-25+,28-27+ Key: RCTGMCJBQGBLKT-PAMTUDGEBE; Key: RCTGMCJBQGBLKT-PAMTUDGESA-N
- SMILES: Cc4ccccc4/N=N/c3ccc(/N=N/c1c2ccccc2ccc1O)c(C)c3

Properties
Chemical formula	C_{24}H_{20}N_{4}O

Hazards
- GHS labelling
Pictograms	(GHS07: Exclamation mark)
Signal word	Warning
Hazard statements	H315, H319
Precautionary statements	P264, P280, P302+P352, P305+P351+P338, P321, P332+P313, P337+P313, P362
- Except where otherwise noted, data are given for materials in their standard state (at 25 °C [77 °F], 100 kPa). verify (what is ?) Infobox references

Sudan IV (C_{24}H_{20}N_{4}O) is a lysochrome (fat-soluble dye) diazo dye used for the staining of lipids, triglycerides and lipoproteins on frozen paraffin sections. It has the appearance of reddish brown crystals with melting point 199 °C and maximum absorption at 520(357) nm.

Sudan IV is one of the dyes used for Sudan staining. Similar dyes include Oil Red O, Sudan III, and Sudan Black B. Staining is an important biochemical technique, offering the ability to visually qualify the presence of the fatty compound of interest without isolating it. For staining purposes, Sudan IV can be made up in propylene glycol. Alternatively, authors have reported using the dye saturated in isopropyl alcohol, 95% ethanol, or 0.05% by weight in acetone:ethanol:water (50:35:15). The idea is to use a moderately apolar solvent to solubilize the dye allowing it to partition into the highly apolar fat without the solvent solubilizing the fat to be stained.

Sudan I, Sudan III, and Sudan IV have been classified as category 3 carcinogen by the International Agency for Research on Cancer.

In its purified form it is called Biebrich scarlet R, which should not be confused with the water-soluble Biebrich scarlet.

In industry, it is used to color nonpolar substances like oils, fats, waxes, greases, various hydrocarbon products, and acrylic emulsions. Sudan IV is also used in United Kingdom as a fuel dye to dye lower-taxed heating oil; because of that it is also known as Oil Tax Red. As a food dye, Sudan IV is considered an illegal dye, mainly because of its harmful effect over a long period of time, as it is a carcinogen. It was ruled unsafe in the 1995 food safety regulations report.

While the dye does stain triglycerides with an intense red color, it does not stain lipid droplets or phospholipids. Sudan IV can be used to stain the aorta by staining lipid-rich plaques. The dye can also be used to stain lipids in atherosclerotic lesions in mice.
