= Lysochrome =

A lysochrome is a soluble dye used for histochemical staining of lipids, which include triglycerides, fatty acids, and lipoproteins. Lysochromes such as Sudan IV dissolve in the lipid and show up as colored regions. The dye does not stick to any other substrates, so a quantification or qualification of lipid presence can be obtained.

The name was coined by John Baker (biologist) in his book "Principles of Biological Microtechnique", published in 1958, from the Greek words lysis (solution) and chroma (colour).
