= List of dyes =

This is a list of dyes with Colour Index International generic names and numbers and CAS Registry numbers.

== List ==
Common name	Synonyms	C.I. generic name	C.I. number	Class	CAS number
Acid Black 52		Acid Black 52	15711	azo	5610-64-0
Acid Blue AS	Weak Acid Blue	Acid Blue 25	62055	anthraquinone	6408-78-2
Acid fuchsin	Acid Magenta; Acid Rubin	Acid Violet 19	42685	triarylmethane	3244-88-0
Acid orange 3		Acid orange 3	10385	nitro	6373-74-6
Acid orange 19		Acid Orange 19	14690	azo	3058-98-8
Acid orange 20	Orange I	Acid Orange 20	14600	azo	523-44-4
Acid Red 13	Fast red E	Acid red 13	16045	azo	2302-96-7
Acid red 25		Acid red 25	16050	azo	5858-93-5
Acid red 88	Fast red A	Acid red 88	15620	azo	1658-56-6
Acid Red 95	Erythrosine Y Diiodofluorescein	Acid red 95	45425	xanthene	33239-19-9
Acid Red 151			26900	diazo	6406-56-0
Acridine orange	Euchrysine	Basic Orange 14	46005	acridine	494-38-2
Acridine red 3B			45000	pyronin	2465-29-4
Acriflavine	Trypaflavine		46000	acridine	65589-70-0; 10597-46-3 (hydrochloride)
Alcian Blue 8GX	Alcian Blue	Ingrain Blue 1	74240	phthalocyanine	75881-23-1
Alcian yellow GXS	Sudan orange	Ingrain yellow 1	12840	azo	61968-79-1
Alizarin	Turkey red	Mordant red 11; Pigment red 83	58000	anthraquinone	72-48-0
Alizarin blue			67410	anthraquinone	66675-89-6
Alizarin cyanin BBS	Anthracene blue SWX	Mordant blue 23	58610	anthraquinone	8005-67-2
Alizarin Red S	alizarin carmine	Mordant red 3	58005	anthraquinone	130-22-3
Alizarin Violet	Gallein	Mordant violet 25	45445	fluorone	2103-64-2
Alizarin yellow GG		Mordant yellow 1	14025	azo	584-42-9
Alizarin yellow R		Mordant orange 1	14030	azo	1718-34-9 (Na salt); 2243-76-7 (acid)
Alkali blue	Alkali blue 4B; Alkali blue 5B	Acid blue 110	42750	triarylmethane	62152-67-4
Alkannin	Anchusin	Natural red 20	75530	natural	517-88-4
Allura Red AC		Food red 17	16035	azo	25956-17-6
Amaranth	Azorubin S	Acid red 27	16185	azo	915-67-3
Amido black 10B	Amidoschwarz; Naphthol blue black	Acid black 1	20470	diazo	1064-48-8
Aniline black		Pigment black 1 Oxidation base 1	50440	azine	13007-86-8
Aniline Yellow	Sudan yellow R Induline R	Solvent yellow 1	11000	azo	60-09-3
Anthracene blue SWR	Alizarin blue 2RC	Mordant blue 32	58605	anthraquinone	6372-24-6
Anthrapurpurin	1,2,7-Trihydroxyanthraquinone		58255	anthraquinone	602-65-3
Apigenin	Chamomile	Natural yellow 1	75580	natural	520-36-5
Apocarotenal		Food orange 6	40820	carotenoid	1107-26-2
Archil red		Acid red 74	13355	azo	6300-18-1
Astaxanthin				carotenoid	472-61-7
Astra blue 6GLL	Astrablau	Basic blue 140	743516	phthalocyanine	61724-62-7
Auramine O	Canary yellow	Basic yellow 2	41000	diarylmethane	2465-27-2
Aurin	Rosolic acid Corallin		43800	triarylmethane	603-45-2
Aurintricarboxylic acid	ATA			triarylmethane	4431-00-9
Azocarmine B		Acid red 103	50090	quinone-imine	25360-72-9
Azocarmine G		Acid red 101	50085	quinone-imine	25641-18-3
Azo-eosin	Azoeosin G	Acid red 4	14710	azo	5858-39-9
Azo Fuchsine 6B		Acid violet 7	18055	azo	4321-69-1
Azophloxine	Red 2G; Azogeranin B Amidonaphthol red G	Acid red 1 Food red 10	18050	azo	3734-67-6
Azorubine		Acid red 14; Food red 3	14720	azo	3567-69-9
Azo violet	Magneson I			azo	74-39-5
Azure A	Methylene azure A		52005	thiazin	531-53-3
Azure B	Methylene azure B		52010	thiazin	531-55-2
Azure C	Methylene azure C		52002	thiazin	531-57-7
Basic Black 2		Basic black 2	11825	azo	4443-99-6
Basic Red 18		Basic red 18	11085	azo	25198-22-5
Benzanthrone		Solvent yellow 182	589005	benzanthrone	82-05-3
Benzo scarlet 4BNS	Amyloid red	Direct red 72	29200	diazo	8005-64-9
Benzyl violet	FD&C violet No. 1	Acid violet 49; Food violet 2	42640	triarylethlamine	1694-09-3
Berberine	Umbellatine	Natural yellow 18	75160	natural	2086-83-1
Betanin	Beetroot red			natural	7659-95-2
Biebrich scarlet	Croceine scarlet Ponceau B	Acid red 66	26905	diazo	4196-99-0
Bismarck brown R	Vesuvine brown	Basic brown 4	21010	diazo	8005-78-5
Bismarck brown Y	Vesuvine BA; Phenylene brown Manchester brown	Basic brown 1	21000	diazo	8005-77-4
Black 7984		Food black 2	27755	diazo	2118-39-0
Blue MX-R		Reactive blue 4	61205	anthraquinone	13324-20-4
BODIPY	Dipyrrometheneboron difluoride				138026-71-8
Brazilin/Brazilein		Natural red 24	75280	natural	474-07-7
Brilliant Black BN		Food Black 1	28440	diazo	2519-30-4
Brilliant blue FCF	Erioglaucine; FD&C Blue No. 1	Acid blue 9 Food blue 2	42090	triarylethlamine	3844-45-9
Brilliant cresyl blue	Cresyl blue BBS	Basic dye	51010	oxazin	81029-05-2
Brilliant green	Malachite green G Zeylonka	Basic green 1	42040	triarylmethane	633-03-4
Bromsulfthalein	BSP			triarylmethane	71-67-0
Bromocresol green	BCG			triarylmethane	76-60-8
Bromocresol purple	BCP			triarylmethane	115-40-2
Bromodeoxyuridine	BDU				59-14-3
Bromophenol blue	BPB; Albutest			triarylmethane	115-39-9
Bromopyrogallol red	Dibromopyrogallosulfonphthalein			triarylmethane	16574-43-9
Bromothymol blue	BTB			triarylmethane	76-59-5
Brooker's merocyanine	MOED			merocyanine	23302-83-2
Brown FK	Kipper brown	Food Brown 1		azo	8062-14-4
Brown HT	Chocolate brown HT	Food Brown 3	20285	diazo	4553-89-3
Brown MX-5BR		Reactive brown 10	179060	azo	12225-67-1
Cadmium acetate			77185	inorganic	543-90-8
Calcofluor white		Fluorescent brightener 28	40622	stilbene	4193-55-9
Calconcarboxylic acid	Patton and Reeder's indicator			azo	3737-95-9
Canthaxanthin		Food orange 8	40850	carotenoid	514-78-3
Capsanthin	Paprika	Natural red 34	75133	natural	465-42-9
Capsorubin				carotenoid	470-38-2
6-Carboxyfluorescein	6-FAM			fluorone	3301-79-9
Carmine	Cochineal; Carminic acid	Natural red 4	75470	natural	1260-17-9
Carthamin	Carthamine	Natural red 26	75140	natural	36338-96-2
Celestin blue		Mordant blue 14	51050	oxazin	1562-90-9
Chrome Azurol S	Alberon	Mordant blue 29	43825	triarylmethane	1667-99-8
Chrome fast yellow 8GL	Luxine pure yellow 6G	Mordant yellow 33	56210	aminoketone	6486-77-7
Chrome violet CG	Aluminon	Mordant violet 39	43810	triphenylmethane	13186-45-3
Chromium(III) chloride	Chromic chloride		77295	inorganic	10025-73-7
Chromium(III) sulfate			77305	inorganic	10101-53-8
Chromotrope 2R	Carmoisine 6R	Acid red 29	16570	azo	4197-07-3
Chromoxane Cyanin R	Solochrome cyanin R Alizarol cyanin R Eriochrome cyanin R	Mordant blue 3	43820	triphenylmethane	3564-18-9
Chrysoidine R		Basic orange 1	11320	azo	4438-16-8
Chrysoidine Y		Basic orange 2	11270	azo	532-82-1
Chrysophanol	Turkey rhubarb	Natural yellow 23	75400	anthraquinone	481-74-3
Ciba blue	Tetrabromoindigo	Vat blue 5	73065	indigoid	5475-31-2
Cibacron Blue F3GA	Procion Blue HB	Reactive blue 2	61211	anthraquinone	12236-82-7
Citrus Red 2	Citrous red No. 2	Solvent red 80	12156	azo	6358-53-8
Congo corinth	Erie garnet B	Direct red 10	22145	diazo	2429-70-1
Congo red	Cotton red	Direct red 28	22120	diazo	573-58-0
Coomassie brilliant blue	Brilliant blue R	Acid blue 83	42660	triarylmethane	6104-59-2
Cotton scarlet		Acid red 73	27290	diazo	5413-75-2
Coumarin 7		Disperse yellow 82; Solvent yellow 145; Solvent yellow 185	551200	coumarin	27425-55-4
Crystal violet	Gentian violet Methyl violet 10B	Basic violet 3	42555	triarylmethane	548-62-9
Cudbear	Orcein archil lacmus	Natural red 28	758600	natural	1400-62-0
Curcumin		Natural yellow 3	75300	natural	458-37-7
D&C Red 33	Azo fuchsine	Acid red 33	17200	azo	3567-66-6
o-Dianisidine		Disperse black 6	24110	diazo	119-90-4
Dibenzpyrenequinone	Vat golden yellow GK	Vat yellow 4	59100	anthraquinone	128-66-5
Dibromoanthanthrone	Vat brilliant orange 3RK	Vat orange 3 Pigment red 168	59300	anthanthrone	4378-61-4
2,5-Dichlorobenzenediazonium	Fast Scarlet GG	Azoic diazo component 3	37010	diazonium salt	15470-55-0
Dichlorophenolindophenol	DCPIP				956-48-9
Direct blue 218		Direct blue 218	24401	diazo	28407-37-6
Direct brown 2		Direct brown 2	22311	diazo	2429-82-5
Direct sky blue 5B	Direct sky blue FB	Direct Blue 15	22400	diazo	2429-74-5
Direct sky blue 6B	Direct sky blue FF	Direct Blue 1	24410	diazo	2610-05-1
Direct yellow 4	Brilliant fast yellow	Direct yellow 4	24890	diazo	3051-11-4
Direct yellow 106	Brilliant fast yellow	Direct yellow 106	40300	stilbene	12222-60-5
Disperse blue 1	1,4,5,8-Tetraaminoanthraquinone	Disperse blue 1 Solvent blue 18	64500	anthraquinone	2475-45-8
Disperse blue 124		Disperse blue 124	111938	azo	61951-51-7
Disperse Orange 1	4-anilino-4'-nitroazobenzene	Disperse orange 1	11080	azo	2581-69-3
Disperse orange 3		Disperse orange 3 Solvent orange 9	11005	azo	730-40-5
Disperse orange 11	1-Amino-2-methylanthraquinone	Disperse orange 11; Solvent orange 35	60700	anthraquinone	82-28-0
Disperse orange 13	Seriplas Orange BL	Disperse orange 13; Solvent orange 52	26080	diazo	6253-10-7
Disperse red 1		Disperse red 1 Solvent red 14	11110	azo	2872-52-8
Disperse Red 9	1-(methylamino)anthraquinone	Disperse red 9 Solvent red 111	60505	anthraquinone	82-38-2
Disperse Red 11	1,4-diamino-2-methoxyanthraquinone	Disperse red 11	62015	anthraquinone	2872-48-2
Disperse Red 60	1-amino-4-hydroxy-2-phenoxyanthraquinone	Disperse red 60	60756	anthraquinone	17418-58-5
Disperse Yellow 3		Disperse yellow 3 Solvent yellow 77; Solvent yellow 99	11855	azo	2832-40-8
Disperse Yellow 26		Disperse yellow 26	10348	nitrodiphenylamine	16611-15-7
Disperse Yellow 42		Disperse yellow 42	10338	nitrodiphenylamine	5124-25-4
Durazol blue 8G		Direct blue 86	74180	phthalocyanine	1330-38-7
Ellagic acid	Alizarine yellow		75270	natural	476-66-4
Eosin B	Eosine bluish Imperial red	Acid red 91	45400	fluorone	548-24-3
Eosin Y ws	Eosine yellowish Bromoeosine; Tetrabromofluorescein	Acid red 87	45380	fluorone	17372-87-1
Eriochrome Black T	Chrome black	Mordant black 11	14645	azo	1787-61-7
Erythrosin B	Red No. 3 Food red 14	Acid red 51	45430	fluorone	16423-68-0
Ethyl eosin	Alcohol soluble eosin	Solvent red 45	45386	fluorone	6359-05-3
Ethyl β-apo-8′-carotenoate	Carophyll yellow	Food orange 7	40825	carotenoid	1109-11-1
Ethyl Green			42590	triarylmethane	14855-76-6
Ethyl violet		Basic violet 4	42600	triarylmethane	2390-59-2
Evans blue	Azovan blue	Direct blue 53	23860	azo	314-13-6
Fast red B	Red B base	Azoic diazo component 5	37125	diazonium salt	27761-26-8
Fast blue B		Azoic diazo component 48	37235	diazonium salt	20282-70-6
Fast Green FCF		Food green 3	42053	triarylmethane	2353-45-9
Fast Yellow AB	Acetyl yellow	Acid yellow 9 Food yellow 2	13015	azo	2706-28-7
Flavazine L		Acid yellow 11	18820	azo	6359-82-6
Fluoran				triarylmethane	596-24-7
Fluorescein		Solvent yellow 94	45350	fluorone	2321-07-5
Food orange 7		Food orange 7	40825	carotenoid	1109-11-1
Fuchsine	Basic fuchsin Rosalinin; Magenta I	Basic violet 14	42510	triarylmethane	632-99-5
Gallamin blue		Mordant blue 45	51045	oxazin	1563-02-6
Gallocyanin		Mordant blue 10	51030	oxazin	1562-85-2
Gossypetin			75750	natural	489-35-0
Green S		Acid green 50; Food green 4	44090	triarylmethane	3087-16-9
Guinea green B	Guinea green	Acid green 3 Food green 1	42085	triarylmethane	4680-78-8
Hematoxylin/Hematein		Natural black 1	75290	natural	517-28-2
Hofmann's Violet	Dahlia; Primula		42530	triarylmethane	8004-86-2
Hydroxynaphthol blue				azo	63451-35-4
Indigo	Indigo blue	Vat blue 1	73000	indigoid	482-89-3
Indigo carmine (synthetic)	Indigo	Acid blue 74	73015	indigoid	860-22-0
Indigo carmine (natural)		Natural blue 2 Food blue 1	75781	natural	860-22-0
Indocyanine green	Cardiogreen			cyanine	3599-32-4
Induline		Solvent blue 7	50400	azine	8004-98-6
Iodine green			42556	triarylmethane	33231-00-4
Isosulfan blue	Patent blue violet	Acid blue 1 Food blue 3	42045	triarylmethane	129-17-9
Janus Green B	Union green B	Basic dye	11050	azo	2869-83-2
Juglone	Oil red BS; Black walnut	Natural brown 7	75500	natural	481-39-0
Kaempferol	Rhamnolutein	Natural yellow 13	75640	natural	520-18-3
Kermes	Kermesic acid	Natural red 3	75460	natural	18499-92-8
Lac	Shellac; Laccaic acid Xanthokermesic acid	Natural red 25	75450	natural	60687-93-6
Lanosol yellow 4G		Reactive yellow 39	18976	azo	70247-70-0
Lawsone	Hennotannic acid Henna	Natural orange 6	75480	natural	83-72-7
Light green SF yellowish	Acid green Lissamine green SF	Acid green 5	42095	triarylmethane	5141-20-8
Lissamine fast red		Acid red 37	17045	azo	6360-07-2
Lissamine flavine FF	Brilliant acid yellow 8G; Fenazo yellow XX; Brilliant sulpho flavine FF	Acid yellow 7	56205	aminoketone	2391-30-2
Lissamine rhodamine B	Kiton rhodamine B Sulphorhodamine B Xylene red B	Acid red 52	45100	xanthene	3520-42-1
Lithol Rubine BK		Pigment red 57	15850	azo	5858-81-1
Luteolin				natural	491-70-3
Luxol fast blue MBS		Solvent blue 38; Direct blue 86	74180	phthalocyanine	1330-38-7
Malachite green	Victoria green B Diamond green B	Basic green 4	42000	triarylmethane	569-64-2
Martius yellow	Naphthol yellow	Acid yellow 24	10315	nitro	605-69-6
Mauveine	Mauve	Mauveine basic dye	50245	safranin	6373-22-4
Meldola blue	Phenylene blue	Basic blue 6	51175	oxazine	966-62-1
Metacresol purple	m-cresolsulfonphthalein			triarylmethane	2303-01-7
Metanil yellow	Tropaeolin G	Acid yellow 36	13065	azo	587-98-4
Methyl blue	Cotton blue Helvetia blue	Acid blue 93	42780	triarylmethane	28983-56-4
Methyl green	Light green	Basic blue 20	42585	triarylmethane	82-94-0
Methyl orange		Acid orange 52	13025	azo	547-58-0
Methyl red		Acid red 2	13020	azo	493-52-7
Methyl violet 2B	Gentian violet B	Basic violet 1	42535	triarylmethane	8004-87-3
Methyl violet 6B			42536	triarylmethane	84215-49-6
Methyl yellow	Butter yellow	Solvent yellow 2	11020	azo	60-11-7
Methylene blue	Swiss blue	Basic blue 9 Solvent blue 8	52015	thiazin	61-73-4
Methylene green		Basic green 5	52020	thiazin	2679-01-8
Milling red G			25110	diazo	
Milling red FR			25115	diazo	
Milling yellow 3G		Acid yellow 40	18950	azo	6372-96-9
Mordant brown 33	Acid chrome brown RH	Mordant brown 33	13250	azo	3618-62-0
Mordant red 19	Chrome red 5G	Mordant red 19	18735	azo	1934-24-3
Mordant yellow 16		Mordant yellow 16	25100	diazo	8003-87-0
Morelloflavone	Fukugetin	Natural yellow 24	75600	natural	16851-21-1
Morin	Calico yellow	Natural yellow 11	75660	natural	480-16-0
Morindin				anthraquinone	60450-21-7
Morindone			75430	anthraquinone	478-29-5
Murexide	Ammonium purpurate		56085	aminoketone	3051-09-0
Naphthalene blue black CS	Blauschwartz NSF	Acid black 41	20480	diazo	5850-37-3
2-Naphthol	β-naphthol	Azoic coupling component 1	37500	diazonium salt	135-19-3
Naphthol green B		Acid green 1	10020	nitroso	19381-50-1
Naphthol yellow S	Sulfur yellow S	Acid yellow 1 Food yellow 1	10316	nitro	846-70-8
Naphthylamin Brown F		Acid brown 6	14625	azo	6419-10-5
Neutral red	Toluylene red	Basic red 5	50040	eurhodin	553-24-2
New fuchsine	Magenta III	Basic violet 2	42520	triarylmethane	3248-91-7
New methylene blue	NMB	Basic blue 24	52030	thiazine	1934-16-3
Night blue		Basic blue 15	44085	triarylmethane	4692-38-0
Nigrosin		Solvent black 5	50415	azine	11099-03-9
Nigrosin WS		Acid black 2	50420	azine	8005-03-6
Nile blue	Nile blue sulphate	Basic blue 12	51180	oxazin	2381-85-3
Nile red	Nile blue oxazone			oxazone	7385-67-3
5-Nitro-o-anisidine	2-Methoxy-5-nitroaniline	Azoic diazo component 13	37130	diazo	99-59-2
Nuclear fast red	Kernechtrot; Calcium red		60760	anthraquinone	6409-77-4
Oil Blue 35	Transparent blue 2N	Solvent blue 35	61554	anthraquinone	17354-14-2
Oil Blue A	Unisol blue AS	Solvent blue 36	61551	anthraquinone	14233-37-5
Oil Orange SS	Orange OT	Solvent Orange 2	12100	azo	2646-17-5
Oil Red O	Sudan red 5B	Solvent red 27	26125	diazo	1320-06-5
Olsalazine (di)sodium		Mordant yellow 5	14130	azo	15722-48-2 (acid); 6054-98-4 (Na salt)
Orange B		Acid orange 137	19235	azo	15139-76-1
Orange G	Orange gelb	Acid orange 10	16230	azo	1936-15-8
Para red	Paranitraniline red	Pigment red 1	12070	azo	6410-10-2
Pararosanilin	Magenta 0 Basic fuchsin	Basic red 9	42500	triarylmethane	569-61-9
Patent Blue V	Sulphan blue	Acid blue 3 Food blue 5	42051	triarylmethane	3536-49-0
Perylenetetracarboxylic dianhydride	PTCDA	Pigment red 224	71127	perylene	128-69-8
p-Phenylenediamine	Paraphenylenediamine	Developer 13	76060	oxidation base	106-50-3
Phloxine B		Acid red 92	45410	fluorone	18472-87-2
Picric acid	Trinitrophenol		10305	nitro	88-89-1
Pigment Red 122	2,9-dimethylquinacridone	Pigment Rot 122; Pigment red 122	73915	quinacridone	980-26-7
Pigment Red 179	Perylene maroon	Vat red 23; Pigment red 179	71130	perylene	5521-31-3
Pigment Red 190		Vat red 29; Pigment red 190	71140	perylene	6424-77-7
Pigment Violet 29		Pigment violet 29; Pigment brown 26	71129	perylene	81-33-4
Ponceau 2R	Xylidine ponceau	Acid red 26; Food red 5	16150	azo	3761-53-3
Ponceau 3R	FD&C Red No. 1	Food red 6	16155	azo	3564-09-8
Ponceau 4R	Cochineal red A Brilliant scarlet 3R	Acid red 18	16255	azo	2611-82-7
Ponceau 6R	Crystal scarlet Crystal ponceau 6R; Brilliant crystal scarlet 6R	Acid red 44	16250	azo	2766-77-0
Ponceau S		Acid red 112	27195	diazo	6226-79-5
Primuline	Carnotine; Chloramine yellow	Direct yellow 59	49010	thiazole	8064-60-6
Prodan				naphthalene	70504-01-7
Purpurin	Alizarin purpurin 1,2,4-Trihydroxyanthraquinone		58205	anthraquinone	81-54-9
Purpuroxanthin	1,3-Dihydroxyanthraquinone		75340	anthraquinone	518-83-2
Pyranine	D&C green 8	Solvent green 7	59040	pyrene	6358-69-6
Pyrogallol	Pyrogallic acid	Oxidation Base 32	76515	oxidation base	87-66-1
Pyronin B			45010	pyronin	2150-48-3
Pyronin Y	Pyronin G		45005	pyronin	92-32-0
Quercetin	Xanthaurine	Natural yellow 10	75670	natural	117-39-5
Quercitrin	Thujin		75720	natural	522-12-3
Quinalizarin	Alizarin bordeaux B	Mordant violet 26	58500	anthraquinone	81-61-8
Quinizarin	1,4-Dihydroxyanthraquinone	Solvent orange 86	58050	anthraquinone	81-64-1
Quinizarine Green SS		Solvent green 3	61565	anthraquinone	128-80-3
Quinoline Yellow SS		Solvent yellow 33	47000	quinoline	8003-22-3
Quinoline Yellow WS	Japan yellow 203	Acid yellow 3 Food yellow 13	47005	quinoline	8004-92-0
Red HE-3B		Reactive red 120	292775	diazo	61951-82-4
Remazol Brilliant Blue R		Reactive blue 19	61200	anthraquinone	2580-78-1
Rhodamine 123				rhodamine	62669-70-9
Rhodamine 6G		Basic red 1	45160	rhodamine	989-38-8
Rhodamine B		Basic violet 10	45170	rhodamine	81-88-9
Rhamnazin			75700	natural	552-54-5
Rhamnocitrin	Kaempferol 7-O-methyl ether	Natural green 2	75650	natural	569-92-6
Riboflavin-5-Sodium Phosphate	Coflavinase				130-40-5
Rose bengal		Acid red 94	45440	fluorone	632-68-8
Rottlerin	Kamala	Natural yellow 25	75310	natural	82-08-6
Ruthenium red	Ammoniated ruthenium oxychloride		77800	inorganic	11103-72-3
Rutin	Rutoside; Sophorin		75730	natural	153-18-4
Saffron	Crocin	Natural yellow 6 Natural yellow 19; Natural red 1	75100	natural	89382-88-7
Safranin O		Basic red 2	50240	safranin	477-73-6
Scarlet GN	Ponceau SX	Food red 1	14700	azo	4548-53-2
Seminaphtharhodafluor	SNARF			fluorone	153967-04-5
Sirius red 4B	Chlorantine fast red 5B	Direct red 81	28160	diazo	2610-11-9
Sirius red F3B		Direct red 80	35780	diazonium salt	2610-10-8
Sirius scarlet GG	Durazol scarlet 2G; Solantine scarlet G	Direct red 76	40270	stilbene	1325-63-9
Smoke royal purple	1,4-Diamino-2,3-dihydroanthraquinone	Solvent violet 47	61690	anthraquinone	81-63-0
Solvent Red 26	Oil red EGN	Solvent red 26	26120	diazo	4477-79-6
Solvent Violet 13	Oil violet 401; D&C Violet No.2	Solvent violet 13; Disperse blue 72	60725	anthraquinone	81-48-1
Solvent Yellow 56	Euromarker; Sudan 455	Solvent yellow 56	11021	azo	2481-94-9
Solvent Yellow 124	Euromarker SY 124	Solvent yellow 124	111155	azo	34432-92-3
Spirit blue	Opal blue SS	Solvent blue 23	42760	triarylmethane	2152-64-9
Stains-all	DBTC			thiazole	7423-31-6
Sudan Black B	Fat black HB	Solvent Black 3	26150	azo	4197-25-5
Sudan I	Solvent yellow R	Solvent yellow 14	12055	azo	842-07-9
Sudan II	Sudan red	Solvent orange 7	12140	azo	3118-97-6
Sudan III	Sudan red BK	Solvent red 23	26100	diazo	85-86-9
Sudan IV	Scarlet R Scharlach R Biebrich scarlet R	Solvent red 24	26105	diazo	85-83-6
Sudan Red 7B	Novasol red RN	Solvent red 19	26050	diazo	6368-72-5
Sudan Red G	Oil red G	Solvent red 1	12150	azo	1229-55-6
Sudan Yellow 3G		Solvent yellow 16	12700	azo	4314-14-1
Sulforhodamine 101	SR101			rhodamine	60311-02-6
Sulphur black 1		Sulphur black 1	53185	sulfur	1326-82-5
Sulphur black 11		Sulphur black 11	53190	sulfur	1327-14-6
Sulphur blue 7		Sulphur blue 7	53440	sulfur	1327-57-7
Sun yellow		Direct yellow 11	40000	stilbene	1325-37-7
Sunset yellow FCF	Orange yellow S	Food yellow 3	15985	azo	2783-9-0
SYBR Green I				cyanine	163795-75-3
Tartrazine	Acid yellow T Hydrazine yellow	Acid yellow 23	19140	azo	1934-21-0
Texas Red	Sulforhodamine 101 acid chloride			rhodamine	82354-19-6
Thioflavine S		Direct yellow 7	49010	thiazole	12262-60-1
Thioflavine T		Basic yellow 1	49005	thiazole	2390-54-7
Thioindigo	DyStar	Vat red 41	73300	thioindigo	522-75-8
Thionin	Lauth's violet		52000	thiazin	581-64-6
Thymolphthalein				triarylmethane	125-20-2
Titan yellow	Clayton yellow	Direct yellow 9	19540	azo	1829-00-1
Toluidine blue	Tolonium chloride	Basic blue 17	52040	thiazin	92-31-9
Tropaeolin O	Chrysoine resorcinol Sulpho orange Gold yellow	Acid orange 6 Food yellow 8	14270	azo	547-57-9
Tropaeolin OO	Fast yellow	Acid orange 5	13080	azo	554-73-4
Tropaeolin OOO2	Orange II; 2-napththol orange	Acid Orange 7	15510	azo	633-96-5
Trypan blue	Niagara blue 3B	Direct blue 14	23850	diazo	72-57-1
Tyrian purple	Phoenician red	Natural violet 1	75800	natural	19201-53-7
Uranin	Fluoresceine sodium	Acid yellow 73	45350	fluorone	518-47-8
Vat Blue 6	Blue K	Vat blue 6	69825	anthraquinone	130-20-1
Vat Blue 36		Vat blue 36	73675	indigoid	6424-69-7
Vat brown 1		Vat brown 1	70802	anthraquinone	2475-33-4
Vat Green 1	Jade green base	Vat green 1	59825	anthraquinone	128-58-5
Vat Green 9	Vat black BB	Vat green 9	59850	anthraquinone	6369-65-9
Vat Orange 1	Vat golden yellow RK	Vat orange 1	59105	anthraquinone	1324-11-4
Vat Yellow 1	Flavanthrone; Indofast yellow	Vat yellow 1	70600	anthraquinone	475-71-8
Vat yellow 2		Vat yellow 2	67300	anthraquinone	129-09-9
Victoria blue 4R		Basic blue 8	42563	triarylmethane	2185-87-7
Victoria blue B		Basic blue 26	44045	triarylmethane	2580-56-5
Victoria blue BO		Basic blue 7	42595	triarylmethane	2390-60-5
Victoria blue R		Basic blue 11	44040	triarylmethane	2185-86-6
Violanthrone	Dibenzanthrone	Vat blue 20	59800	violanthrone	116-71-2
Water blue	Aniline blue	Acid blue 22	42755	triarylmethane	28631-66-5
Woodstain scarlet	Crocein scarlet 3B; Brilliant crocein MOO	Acid red 73	27290	diazo	5413-75-2
Wool red B	Fast milling red B	Acid red 115	27200	diazo	6226-80-8
Xylene cyanol FF		Acid blue 147	42135	triarylmethane	2650-17-1
Yellow 2G	Lissamine fast yellow	Acid yellow 17; Food yellow 5	18965	azo	6359-98-4
Yellow H-A		Reactive yellow 3	13245	azo	6539-67-9

Note

- Synonyms should be treated with caution because they are often used inconsistently, see discussion page and external link

== See also ==
- Glossary of dyeing terms

== Sources ==
- BDH laboratory chemicals & biochemicals catalogue 1983
- Important Early Synthetic Dyes 1991 Smithsonian Institution
