= SunnyD =

Orange-flavored beverage

- Manufacturer: Sunny Delight Beverages
- Distributor: Keurig Dr Pepper (US); Saputo (Canada)
- Introduced: 1963
- Color: Varies by flavor
- Flavor: Various
- Ingredients: Water, high fructose corn syrup, 2% or less concentrated juices
- Website: www.sunnyd.com

SunnyD (named Sunny Delight prior to 2000) is an orange drink developed in 1963 by Doric Foods of Mount Dora, Florida, United States. Additional plants were built in California and Ohio in 1974 and 1978, respectively. In April 1983, Sundor Brands bought out Doric Foods; Sundor Brands was then purchased by American multinational Procter & Gamble in March 1989.

The drink produced an estimated $455 million in revenue for Procter & Gamble in 2004. In 2005, Sunny Delight was spun off into the independent Sunny Delight Beverages Company (SDBC). The beverage is also distributed by Dr Pepper/Seven Up (DPSU). In Canada, the drink is manufactured and distributed by Saputo.

The beverage was launched in the United Kingdom in April 1998 with a £10 million promotional campaign, and by August 1999, it became the third biggest selling soft drink in the United Kingdom, behind Coca-Cola and Pepsi. It was sold in refrigerated cabinets, and marketed as a healthier alternative to soft drinks despite neither being healthier nor requiring refrigeration.

SunnyD originally only sold one flavor (being orange), but would later go on to include other flavors including Tangy Original, Smooth Orange, Orange Strawberry, Orange Mango, Orange Peach, Watermelon, Fruit Punch, Peach, Mango, Blue Raspberry, Cherry Limeade, Lemonade, and Orange Pineapple.

== Ingredients ==
As of 2020 in the United States, SunnyD's ingredients consist of:

- Water
- High fructose corn syrup
- 2% or less of the following:
  - Citric acid
  - Ascorbic acid
  - Thiamin hydrochloride
  - Natural flavors
  - Modified cornstarch
  - Canola oil
  - Sodium citrate
  - Cellulose gum
  - Sucralose
  - Acesulfame potassium
  - Neotame
  - Sodium hexametaphosphate
  - Potassium sorbate
  - Yellow #5
  - Yellow #6
  - Concentrated juices:
    - Orange
    - Tangerine
    - Apple
    - Lime
    - Grapefruit
    - Pear
  - Red #33
  - Red #40

== Promotional campaigns ==
=== Reach for the Sun Bottle Hunt ===
Images of Sunny Delight bottles were hidden across the Web.

In the middle of the 1990s, Sunny Delight sponsored an early internet contest promoting their beverage. For the game, the "Reach for the Sun Bottle Hunt", simple graphics depicting Sunny Delight bottles were incorporated into independent American web sites. The site locations were various personal home pages or more well known internet resources.

At the main contest site, riddles were provided weekly to help people discover each of the sites displaying a hidden bottle. Participants were encouraged to use the newest search engines in combination with the riddles.

Initially appearing in 1996 and gaining widespread attention, the contest was repeated three times over the course of a year and a half, and over 4,000 prizes were awarded during each iteration, ranging from T-shirts to college scholarships. As a pioneering internet advertising meme, it set the stage for years of later web marketing promotions.

=== Peel 'n Taste Flavor Strips ===
In July 2009, to promote the company's Sunny Delight Smoothies, the company partnered with Food Lion supermarkets to place SunnyD Smoothies Peel 'n Taste flavor samplers in the aisles where Sunny Delight products were located.

=== Reformulation ===
In recent years, the artificial sweetener sucralose has been added in combination with high fructose corn syrup, in order to cut the calorie count.

As of 2023, North American Sunny Delight contains 2% or less concentrated fruit juice.

== Controversies ==
In the United Kingdom, there were many negative press reports about the product, following an investigation by The Food Commission, an independent consumer organisation in the United Kingdom.

In December 1999, according to a report by BBC News, the negative publicity escalated when a Sunny Delight television commercial showing a snowman turning orange was released, at about the same time as reports of a four-year-old girl who experienced her skin turning orange – due to the product's use of beta-Carotene for color – after drinking an estimated 1.5 liters of Sunny Delight a day.

Sales had halved by 2001, and the drink was redesigned and reinvented in March 2003 as "SunnyD". In the United Kingdom, SunnyD was relaunched in March 2009, with a new formulation containing 70% fruit juice and no artificial ingredients or added sugar. However, amid declining sales, the product was further reformulated in April 2010, as a lower priced beverage containing only 15% fruit juice.

In January 2024, the drink was the subject of BBC Radio 4's consumer programme Sliced Bread Presents: Toast, which discussed "why sales of Sunny Delight faltered in the UK after an extremely successful launch".

The brand's Twitter account is known for its odd tweets; one particular tweet, saying "I can't do this anymore" created extensive engagement from other brands, but has received criticism for trivializing and monetizing mental illness.

== See also ==
- Capri Sun
- Tang
- Kool-Aid
- Orange drink
- Orange juice
- Soft drinks
