= Loop-mediated isothermal amplification =

Single tube technique for the amplification of DNA

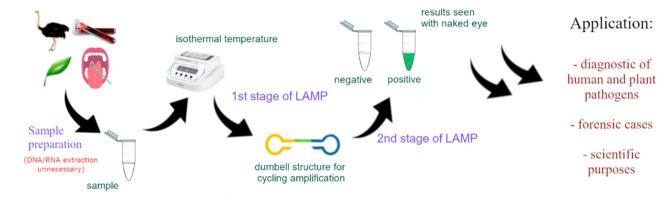
Loop-mediated isothermal amplification (LAMP) process

Loop-mediated isothermal amplification (LAMP) is a single-tube technique for the amplification of DNA for diagnostic purposes and a low-cost alternative to detect certain diseases. LAMP is an isothermal nucleic acid amplification technique. In contrast to the polymerase chain reaction (PCR) technology, in which the reaction is carried out with a series of alternating temperature steps or cycles, isothermal amplification is carried out at a constant temperature, and does not require a thermal cycler. LAMP was invented in 1998 by Eiken Chemical Company in Tokyo. Reverse transcription loop-mediated isothermal amplification (RT-LAMP) combines LAMP with a reverse transcription step to allow the detection of RNA.

== Amplification ==
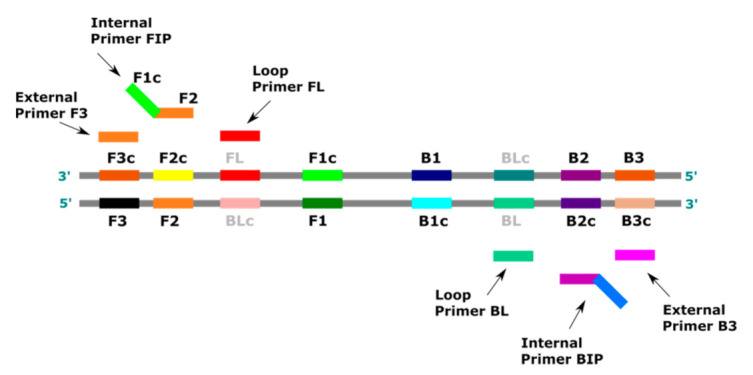
Loop-mediated isothermal amplification (LAMP) primers

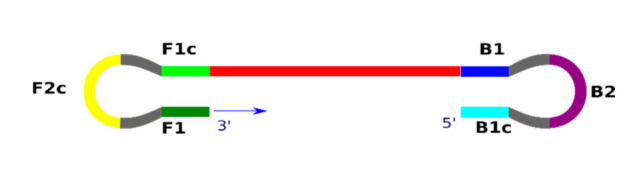
Loop-mediated isothermal amplification (LAMP) product

In LAMP, the target sequence is amplified at a constant temperature of 60–65 °C (140–149 °F) using either two or three sets of primers and a polymerase like Bst Klenow fragment with high strand displacement activity in addition to a replication activity. Typically, four different primers are used to amplify six distinct regions on the target gene, which increases specificity. An additional pair of "loop primers" can further accelerate the reaction. The amount of DNA produced in LAMP is considerably higher than PCR-based amplification. Primer design could be performed using several programs, such as PrimerExplorer, MorphoCatcher, and NEB LAMP Primer Design Tool. For the screening of conservative and species-specific nucleotide polymorphisms, in most diagnostics applications a combination of PrimerExplorer and MorphoCatcher is very useful, because it allows for the localization of species-specific nucleotides at 3'-ends of primers to enhance the specificity of reactions.

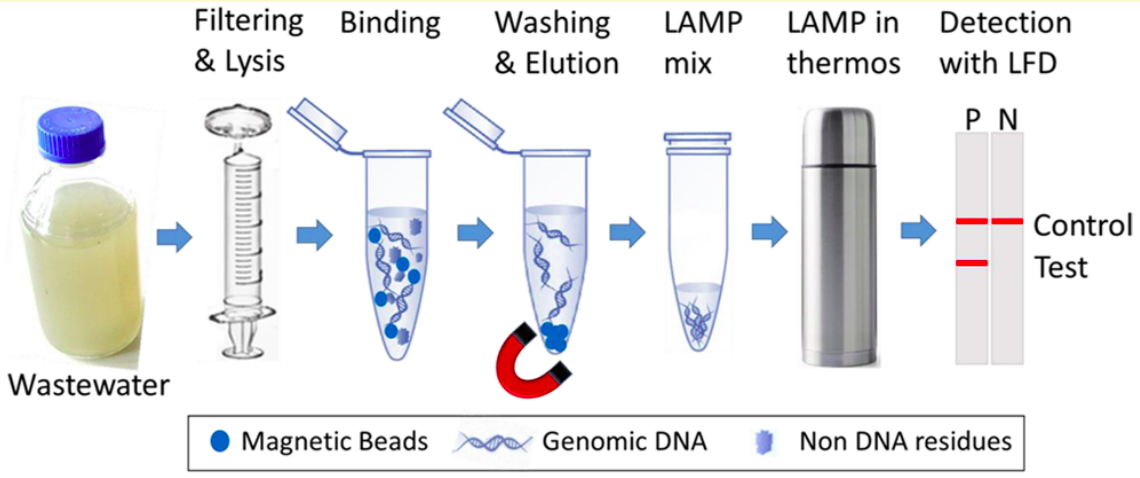
Schema of a LAMP of nucleic acid biomarkers from raw untreated wastewater samples, to rapidly quantify human-specific mitochondrial DNA (mtDNA).

== Detection ==
The amplification product can be detected via photometry, measuring the turbidity caused by magnesium pyrophosphate precipitate in solution as a byproduct of amplification. This allows easy visualization by the naked eye or via simple photometric detection approaches for small volumes. The reaction can be followed in real-time either by measuring the turbidity or by fluorescence using intercalating dyes such as SYTO 9.

Dyes, such as SYBR green, can be used to create a visible color change that can be seen with the naked eye without the need for expensive equipment, or for a response that can more accurately be measured by instrumentation. Dye molecules intercalate or directly label the DNA, and in turn can be correlated with the number of copies initially present. Hence, LAMP can also be quantitative. In-tube detection of LAMP DNA amplification is possible using manganese loaded calcein which starts fluorescing upon complexation of manganese by pyrophosphate during in vitro DNA synthesis. Another method for visual detection of the LAMP amplicons by the unaided eye was based on their ability to hybridize with complementary gold nanoparticle-bound (AuNP) single-stranded DNA (ssDNA) and thus prevent the normal red to purple-blue color change that would otherwise occur during salt-induced aggregation of the gold particles. So, a LAMP method combined with amplicon detection by AuNP can have advantages over other methods in terms of reduced assay time, amplicon confirmation by hybridization and use of simpler equipment (i.e., no need for a thermocycler, electrophoresis equipment or a UV trans-illuminator).

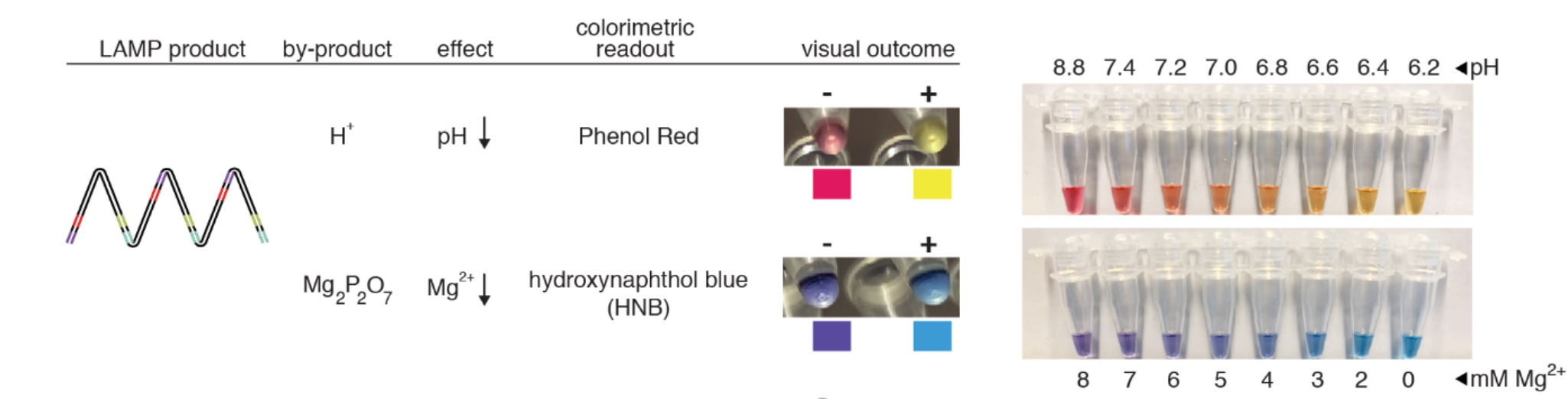
Colorimetric detections

pH-dependent dye indicators such as Phenol Red induce a color change from pink to yellow when the pH value of the reaction decreases upon DNA amplification. Due to its pronounced color change, this is the most commonly used readout for RT-LAMP assays. However, the pH-change dependent readout requires a weakly buffered reaction solution, which poses a great challenge when using crude sample inputs with variable pH. A second colorimetric assay utilizes metal ion indicators such as hydroxynaphthol blue (HNB), which changes color from purple to blue upon a drop in free Mg^{2+} ions, which form a Mg-pyrophosphate precipitate upon DNA amplification.

== Uses and benefits ==
LAMP is a relatively new DNA amplification technique, which due to its simplicity, ruggedness, and low cost could provide major advantages. LAMP has the potential to be used as a simple screening assay in the field or at the point of care by clinicians. Because LAMP is isothermal, which eradicates the need for expensive thermocyclers used in conventional PCR, it may be a particularly useful method for infectious disease diagnosis in low and middle income countries. LAMP is widely being studied for detecting infectious diseases such as filariasis, Zika Virus, tuberculosis, malaria, sleeping sickness, and SARS-CoV-2. In developing regions, it has yet to be extensively validated for other common pathogens.

LAMP has been observed to be less sensitive (more resistant) than PCR to inhibitors in complex samples such as blood, likely due to use of a different DNA polymerase (typically Bst – Bacillus stearothermophilus – DNA polymerase rather than Taq polymerase as in PCR). Several reports describe successful detection of pathogens from minimally processed samples such as heat-treated blood, or in presence of clinical sample matrices. This feature of LAMP may be useful in low-resource or field settings where a conventional DNA or RNA extraction prior to diagnostic testing may be impractical.

LAMP has also been used in helping identify body fluids. With its simplicity, researchers are able to test one or more samples with little hands on time which is helping cut down the time needed to get results. Researchers have also been able to add factors to make identification even more simple including metal-indicator dye and phenol red to be able to use a smartphone and the naked eye respectively to analyze the results.

== Limitations ==
LAMP is less versatile than PCR, the most well-established nucleic acid amplification technique. LAMP is useful primarily as a diagnostic or detection technique, but is not useful for cloning or many other molecular biology applications enabled by PCR. Because LAMP uses 4 (or 6) primers targeting 6 (or 8) regions within a fairly small segment of the genome, and because primer design is subject to numerous constraints, it is difficult to design primer sets for LAMP "by eye". Free, open-source or commercial software packages are generally used to assist with LAMP primer design, although the primer design constraints mean there is less freedom to choose the target site than with PCR.

In a diagnostic application, this must be balanced against the need to choose an appropriate target (e.g., a conserved site in a highly variable viral genome, or a target that is specific for a particular strain of pathogen). Multiple degenerated sequences may be required to cover the different variant strains of the same species. A consequence of having such a cocktail of primers can be non-specific amplification in the late amplification.

Multiplexing approaches for LAMP are less developed than for PCR. The larger number of primers per target in LAMP increases the likelihood of primer-primer interactions for multiplexed target sets. The product of LAMP is a series of concatemers of the target region, giving rise to a characteristic "ladder" or banding pattern on a gel, rather than a single band as with PCR. Although this is not a problem when detecting single targets with LAMP, "traditional" (endpoint) multiplex PCR applications wherein identity of a target is confirmed by size of a band on a gel are not feasible with LAMP. Multiplexing in LAMP has been achieved by choosing a target region with a restriction site, and digesting prior to running on a gel, such that each product gives rise to a distinct size of fragment, although this approach adds complexity to the experimental design and protocol.

The use of a strand-displacing DNA polymerase in LAMP also precludes the use of hydrolysis probes, e.g. TaqMan probes, which rely upon the 5'-3' exonuclease activity of Taq polymerase. An alternative real-time multiplexing approach based on fluorescence quenchers has been reported.

SYBR green dye may be added to view LAMP in real-time. However, in the late amplification, primer-dimer amplification may contribute to a false positive signal. The use of inorganic pyrophosphatase in a SYBR reaction mix allows the use of melt analysis to distinguish correct amplification

Although different mitigation strategies have been proposed for false-positive results in assays based on this method, nonspecific amplification due to various factors including the absence of temperature gating mechanisms is one of the major limitations of Loop-mediated isothermal amplification.

Lastly, because LAMP requires maintained, elevated incubation temperatures (60–65 °C), some sort of heating mechanism, thermostat, and/or insulator is required (though not necessarily a thermal cycler). This requirement makes LAMP less ideally suited for in the field, point-of-care diagnostics which would ideally function at ambient temperature.

== Research ==
RNase hybridization-assisted amplification (RHAM) integrates LAMP with RNase HII-mediated fluorescent reporting. This method employs a conventional LAMP primer set to exponentially amplify the target sequence, followed by the hybridization of a ribonucleotide-containing fluorescent probe to the amplification product. RNase HII then cleaves the probe, releasing a fluorescent signal that can be detected.
