= C12H12N2O =

The molecular formula C_{12}H_{12}N_{2}O (molar mass: 200.24 g/mol, exact mass: 200.0950 u) may refer to:

- Harmalol
- 4,4'-Oxydianiline
