= C13H14N2 =

The molecular formula C_{13}H_{14}N_{2} may refer to:

- Lanicemine, a low-trapping NMDA receptor antagonist
- 4,4'-Methylenedianiline, an organic compound produced on industrial scale as a precursor to polyurethanes
- Tacrine, a centrally acting acetylcholinesterase inhibitor and parasympathomimetic
