= E128 =

E128 can refer to:

- Red 2G, a food additive
- A medical form for students and workers now replaced by the European Health Insurance Card
- Element 128, unbioctium, a predicted chemical element; see Extended periodic table § Superactinides
