= Switch Health =

Canadian company

- Industry: Health
- Founded: March 2020
- Headquarters: Toronto, Canada
- Area served: Canada
- Key people: Marc Thomson, CEO
- Services: Medical testing
- Website: www.switchhealth.ca

Switch Health is a Canadian company that provides COVID-19 testing services. The company was founded in Toronto in 2020.

== Organization ==
The company is led by chief executive officer Marc Thomson. Other key staff include Mary Langley and Olga Jilani. Board members include politician and former federal health minister Rona Ambrose.

== Activities and history ==
The company was founded in Toronto in March 2020. It provides services to enable home self-testing for COVID-19 and provides testing services for organizations including the Canadian Broadcasting Corporation, Air Canada, Ontario Health, and the Government of Canada.

The company's reverse transcription loop-mediated isothermal amplification test was used as an alternative to Polymerase chain reaction tests. In 2021, the company was criticised by Conservative Party of Canada leader Erin O’Toole who stated that "one in six of their tests have failed to deliver a test result within the 14-day quarantine period”.

By February 2022, the company had 2,000 employees. During 2022, the company was developing products for home testing for sexually transmitted diseases.
