= Eiken Chemical =

Eiken Chemical Co., Ltd.
- Native name: 栄研化学株式会社
- Company type: Public KK
- Traded as: TYO: 4549
- ISIN: JP3160700005
- Industry: Pharmaceutical
- Founded: February 20, 1939; 87 years ago
- Headquarters: Taito-ku, Tokyo, 110-8408, Japan
- Area served: Worldwide
- Key people: Morifumi Wada (President and CEO)
- Products: Clinical diagnostic products; Reagents
- Revenue: ▲JPY 35 billion (FY 2017) (US$ 315 million) (FY 2017)
- Net income: ▼JPY 2.6 billion (FY 2017) (US$ 23.5 million) (FY 2017)
- Number of employees: 659 (as of March 31, 2018)
- Website: Official website

Eiken Chemical (栄研化学株式会社, Eiken Kagaku Kabushiki-gaisha) is a Japanese company headquartered in Tokyo, established in 1939. The company's business is manufacturing and sales of clinical diagnostics and equipment.

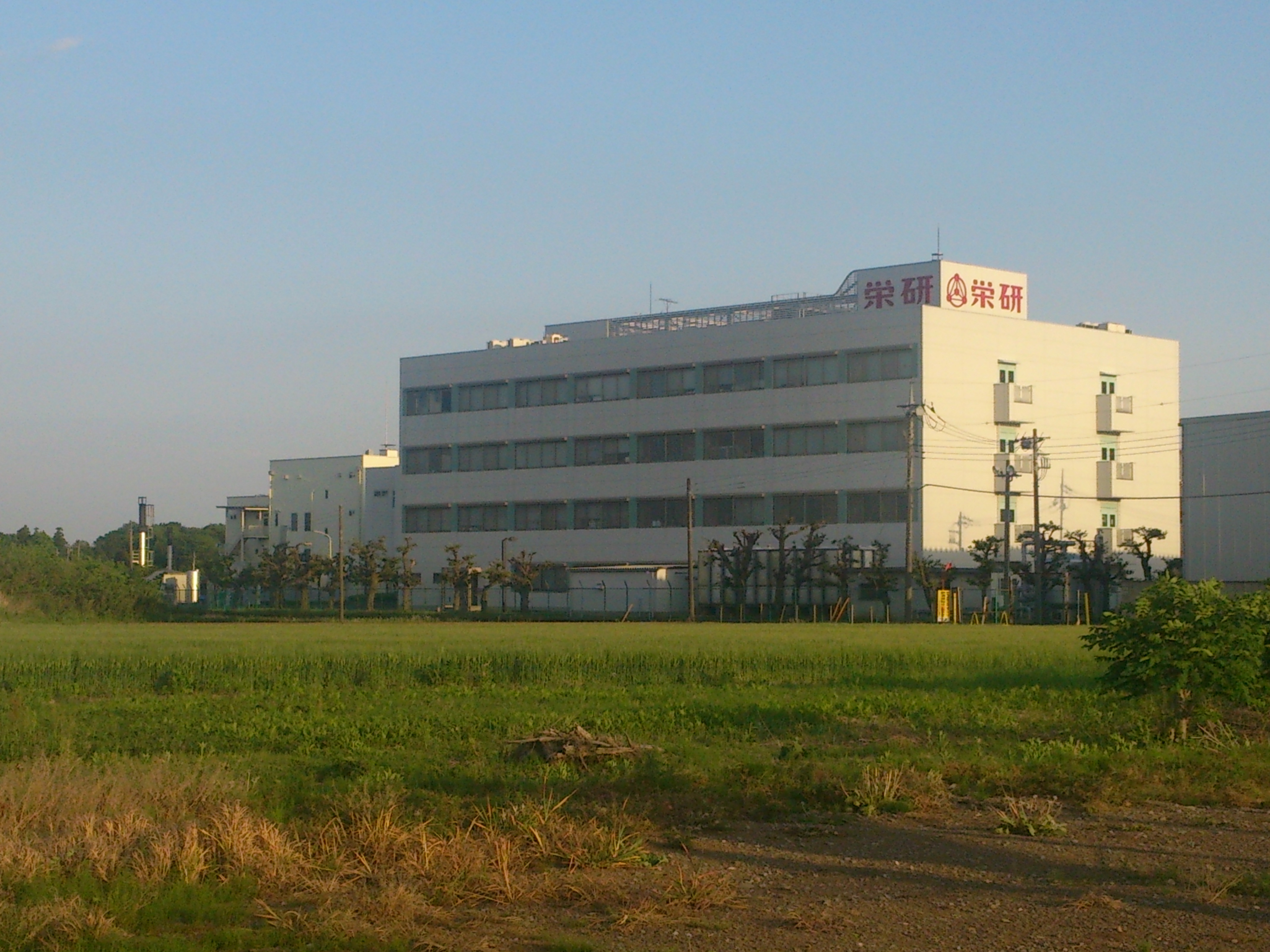
Eiken biochemical laboratories in Nogi, Tochigi Prefecture

Eiken's major products include fecal immunochemical test reagents, immunological and serological reagents, microbiological reagents, urinalysis test strips, clinical chemistry reagents, molecular genetics, medical devices and industrial products.

The company in 1998 developed the Loop-mediated isothermal amplification (LAMP) method, a nucleic acid amplification method, and an alternative to traditional PCR.
