= Allergen of the Year =

Annual award

Allergen of the Year is an annual award voted upon by the American Contact Dermatitis Society, aiming to raise awareness about common allergens. The purpose of the award is "to draw attention to the agents causing the most significant clinical effects, those that are under-recognized and those that have become obsolete or for which exposure patterns have changed".

== Awards ==
Year	Allergen	Description	References
2026	Benzyl alcohol	Aromatic alcohol widely used as a preservative, solvent, and fragrance ingredient in personal care products, topical medications, and injectable formulations.	
2025	Toluene-2,5-diamine sulfate	Aromatic amine used in hair dyes.	
2024	Sulfites	Group of compounds used to preserve food and drink products.	
2023	Lanolin	Natural wax from sheep's wool, often used in skincare products.	
2022	Aluminium	Common metal.	
2021	Acetophenone azine	Compound found in EVA foam, used in sporting equipment and footwear.	
2020	Isobornyl acrylate	Used in medical devices for diabetes patients.	
2019	Parabens (selected as a non-allergen)	"One of the least allergenic preservatives available".	
2018	Propylene glycol	Emulsifier used in foods and cosmetics.	
2017	Alkyl glucosides	Surfactants extracted from vegetal and renewable sources. Often used in cosmetic products.	
2016	Cobalt	Metal.	
2015	Formaldehyde	Preservative.	
2014	Benzophenones	Chemical ultraviolet light absorbers used in products such as sunscreens, hair sprays and photographic filters.	
2013	Methylisothiazolinone	Chemical used as a preservative in many cosmetics, lotions, and makeup removers..	
2012	Acrylate	Plastic materials derived from acrylic acid or methacrylic acid with a variety of uses, including in paints, adhesives, printing ink and in the medical and dental professions.	
2011	Dimethyl fumarate	Chemical often used to inhibit the growth of mold. Has been banned in consumer products in the European Union since 2009.	
2010	Neomycin	Common antibiotic.	
2009	Mixed dialkyl thiourea	Used in rubber manufacturing, Neoprene rubber is a common source.	
2008	Nickel	Cheap metal, widely used in coins and household items.	
2007	Fragrance	Variety of compounds with smells or odours.	
2006	p-Phenylenediamine	Common hair dye chemical that is used to augment black henna tattoos. It has been shown to cause severe blistering and scarring, and its topical use is banned in some countries.	
2005	Corticosteroids	Class of steroid hormones, can be used to treat a variety of medical conditions.	
2004	Cocamidopropyl betaine	Mixture of closely related organic compounds, used in soaps and shampoos.	
2003	Bacitracin	Common antibiotic.	
2002	Thimerosal	Well-established antiseptic and antifungal agent, often used in medicines and vaccines.	
2001	Gold	Precious metal, used often in jewelry.	
2000	Disperse blue dye	Dye used to color synthetic textiles.	

== See also ==
- List of cutaneous conditions
