= Food orange 7 =

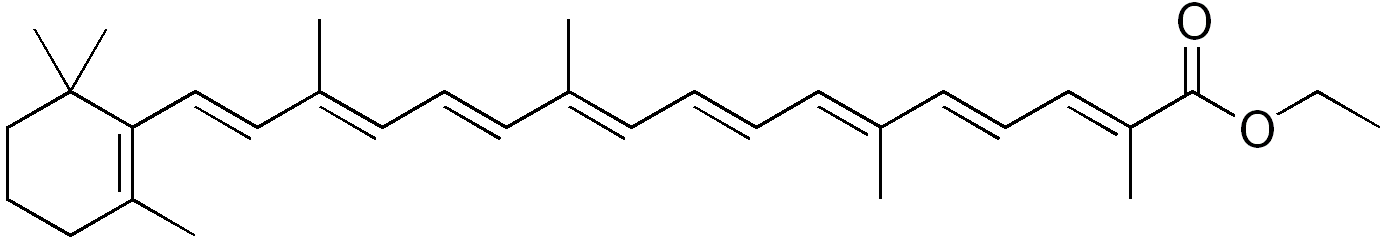

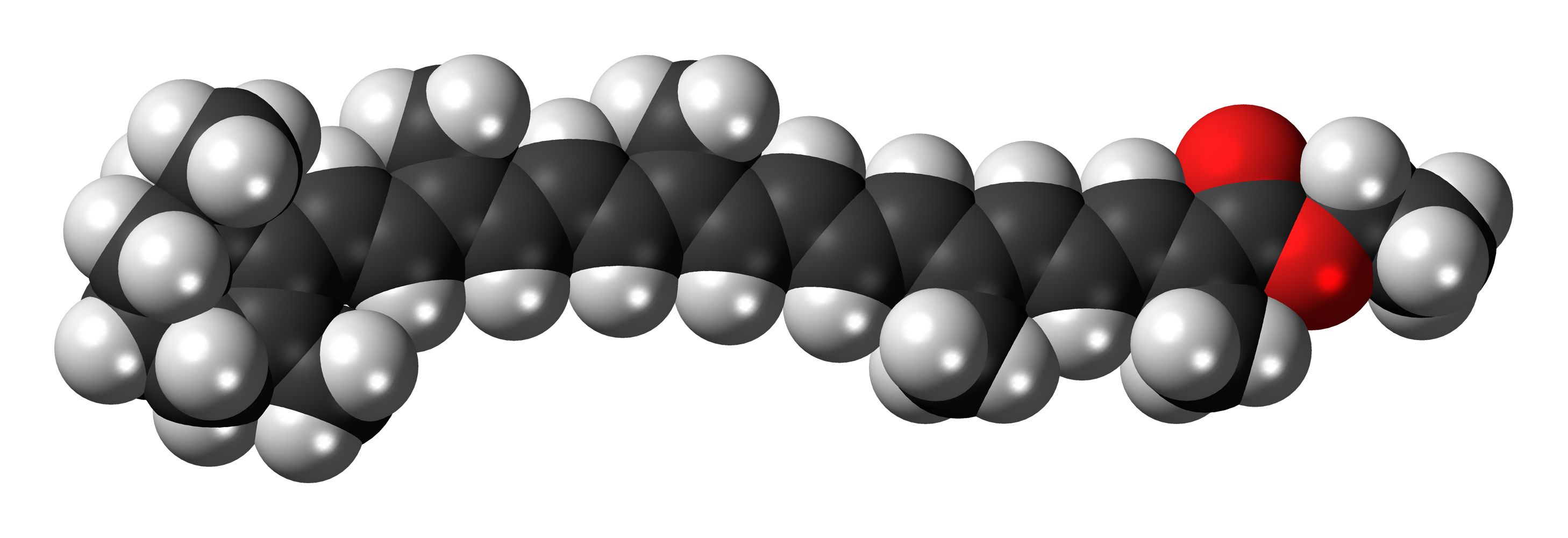

Names
- IUPAC name Ethyl 8′-apo-β-caroten-8′-oate
- Systematic IUPAC name Ethyl (2E,4E,6E,8E,10E,12E,14E,16E)-2,6,11,15-tetramethyl-17-(2,6,6-trimethylcyclohex-1-en-1-yl)heptadeca-2,4,6,8,10,12,14,16-octaenoate
- Other names: Ethyl ester of beta-apo-8'-carotenic acid; Ethyl 8'-apo-beta,psi-carotenoate; E160f

Identifiers
| CAS Number | 1109-11-1 |
| 3D model (JSmol) | Interactive image |
| ChemSpider | 4907239 |
| ECHA InfoCard | 100.012.885 |
| EC Number | 214-173-7 |
| E number | E160f (colours) |
| PubChem CID | 6391647 |
| CompTox Dashboard (EPA) | DTXSID901015586 |
- InChI: InChI=1S/C32H44O2/c1-9-34-31(33)29(6)20-13-19-26(3)16-11-10-15-25(2)17-12-18-27(4)22-23-30-28(5)21-14-24-32(30,7)8/h10-13,15-20,22-23H,9,14,21,24H2,1-8H3/b11-10+,17-12+,19-13+,23-22+,25-15+,26-16+,27-18+,29-20+ Key: GIRXTOSJOKKBHO-BQTUIHPCSA-N
- SMILES: CCOC(=O)/C(=C/C=C/C(=C/C=C/C=C(\C)/C=C/C=C(\C)/C=C/C1=C(CCCC1(C)C)C)/C)/C

Properties
| Chemical formula | C_{32}H_{44}O_{2} |
| Molar mass | 460.702 g·mol^{−1} |
- Except where otherwise noted, data are given for materials in their standard state (at 25 °C [77 °F], 100 kPa). verify (what is ?) Infobox references

Food orange 7, the ethyl ester of beta-apo-8'-carotenic acid, is a carotenoid with an orange-red color. It is found in small quantities in some plants, but is often produced commercially from apocarotenal (E160e). It is used as a food coloring under the E number E160f and is approved for use in Australia and New Zealand. It was formerly approved for use in the EU and UK, but was delisted in November 2011 as it was no longer being manufactured. It is not approved in the United States.
