= Alizarin Red S =

Chemical compound and histologic dye

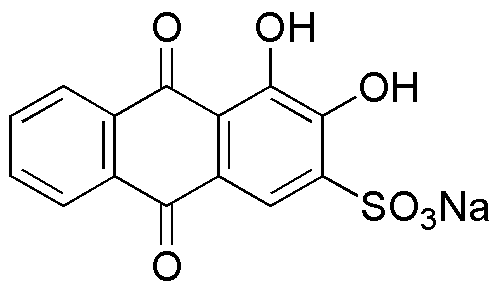

Names
- IUPAC name Sodium 3,4-Dihydroxy-9,10-dioxo-9,10-dihydroanthracene-2-sulfonate
- Other names: Mordant Red 3; C.I 58005; Sodium alizarinesulfonate; Alizarine S; Alizarine sulfonate; Alizarin Red, water-soluble; Alizarin Carmine; Alizarin sodium monosulfonate

Identifiers
CAS Number	130-22-3
3D model (JSmol)	Interactive image
ChEBI	CHEBI:87358
ChEMBL	ChEMBL175336
ChemSpider	8217
ECHA InfoCard	100.004.530
EC Number	204-981-8
PubChem CID	3955344
UNII	3F3AT0Q12H
CompTox Dashboard (EPA)	DTXSID6052744
- InChI: InChI=1S/C14H8O7S.Na/c15-11-6-3-1-2-4-7(6)12(16)10-8(11)5-9(22(19,20)21)13(17)14(10)18;/h1-5,17-18H,(H,19,20,21);/q;+1/p-1 Key: HFVAFDPGUJEFBQ-UHFFFAOYSA-M
- SMILES: [Na+].Oc1c(O)c2C(=O)c3ccccc3C(=O)c2cc1S([O-])(=O)=O

Properties
Chemical formula	C_{14}H_{7}NaO_{7}S
Molar mass	342.253 g/mol
Appearance	yellow-orange powder
Solubility in water	Soluble in water and ethanol

Hazards
- Safety data sheet (SDS)
- Except where otherwise noted, data are given for materials in their standard state (at 25 °C [77 °F], 100 kPa). Infobox references

Alizarin Red S (also known as C.I. Mordant Red 3, Alizarin Carmine, and C.I 58005.) is a water-soluble sodium salt of Alizarin sulfonic acid with a chemical formula of C_{14}H_{7}NaO_{7}S. Alizarin Red S was discovered by Graebe and Liebermann in 1871. In the field of histology alizarin Red S is used to stain calcium deposits in tissues, and in geology to stain and differentiate carbonate minerals.

== Uses ==
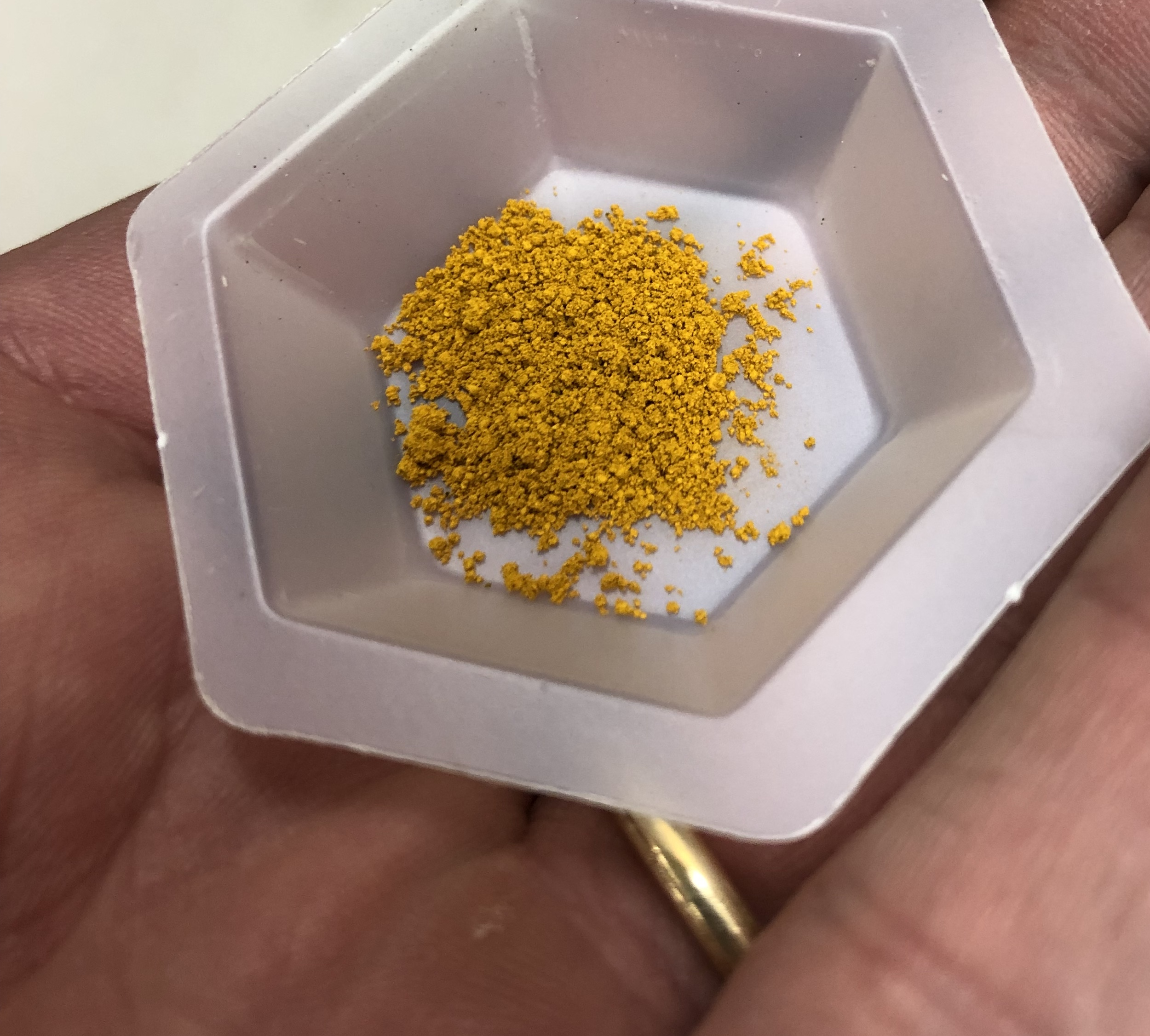
Alizarin Red S, as sold for use as a histologic stain.

Alizarin Red S is used in histology and histopathology to stain, or locate calcium deposits in tissues. In the presence of calcium, Alizarin Red S, binds to the calcium to form a Lake pigment that is orange to red in color. Whole specimens can be stained with Alizarin Red S to show the distribution of bone, especially in developing embryos. In living corals alizarin Red S has been used to mark daily growth layers.

In geology, Alizarin Red S is used on thin sections, and polished surfaces to help identify carbonate minerals which stain at different rates.

== See also ==
- Aniline
- 1,2,4-Trihydroxyanthraquinone or purpurin, another red dye that occurs in madder root
- Hydroxyanthraquinone
- Dihydroxyanthraquinone
- List of dyes
- List of colors (compact)
