= Pigment Red 122 =

Identifiers
| CAS Number | 980-26-7 |
| 3D model (JSmol) | Interactive image |
| ChemSpider | 63602 |
| ECHA InfoCard | 100.012.329 |
| EC Number | 213-561-3 |
| PubChem CID | 70423 |
| UNII | 28UCS3P84C |
| CompTox Dashboard (EPA) | DTXSID2052655 |
- InChI: InChI=1S/C22H16N2O2/c1-11-3-5-17-13(7-11)21(25)15-9-20-16(10-19(15)23-17)22(26)14-8-12(2)4-6-18(14)24-20/h3-10H,1-2H3,(H,23,25)(H,24,26) Key: TXWSZJSDZKWQAU-UHFFFAOYSA-N
- SMILES: CC1=CC2=C(C=C1)NC3=CC4=C(C=C3C2=O)NC5=C(C4=O)C=C(C=C5)C
- Except where otherwise noted, data are given for materials in their standard state (at 25 °C [77 °F], 100 kPa). Infobox references

Pigment Red 122 is an organic compound. A purple solid, it is related to quinacridone, a motif found in several organic pigments.

== Extraction and presentation ==
Pigment Red 122 can be obtained by the reaction of dimethyl succinyl succinate with p-toluidine, followed by base hydrolysis of the resulting intermediate with sodium hydroxide and subsequent cyclization.

== Use ==
Pigment Red 122 is used as a pigment in paints and printing inks. It exhibits very good light fastness, very good migration fastness, and thermostability, as well as sterilization fastness and calendering fastness. The pigment produces a very bluish, pure red shade, which is usually described as pink or magenta. The main areas of application are similar to those of the γ-modification of unsubstituted quinacridone in the field of high-quality paints and printing inks, as well as in the coloration of polystyrene plastics, acrylonitrile butadiene styrene copolymer, polycarbonate, PVC films and PVC-based coatings, and polyurethanes. It is also used in technical and toy articles made of PVC and polyolefins, as well as in PO films and polyester fibers. Owing to its higher weather fastness, it is also suitable for use in metallic paints for passenger cars. Its resistance to common organic solvents is very good, which also provides good overcoat fastness in oven-drying systems. Due to its good weather fastness, the pigment is also of interest for exterior architectural coatings. Because of its resistance to common solvents such as styrene and acetone, it is suitable for laminates based on polyester as well as melamine resin.
