= 4,4'-Thiodianiline =

4,4′-Thioaniline

Names
- Preferred IUPAC name 4,4′-Sulfanediyldianiline
- Other names p,p′-Thiodianiline; Bis(4-aminophenyl) sulfide; 4,4′-Thioaniline; 4-(4-Aminophenyl)sulfanylaniline

Identifiers
CAS Number	139-65-1
3D model (JSmol)	Interactive image
ChEBI	CHEBI:82374
ChEMBL	ChEMBL348856
ChemSpider	8435
ECHA InfoCard	100.004.883
EC Number	205-370-9
KEGG	C19303
PubChem CID	8765
UNII	6GGU990BQF
CompTox Dashboard (EPA)	DTXSID9021344
- InChI: InChI=1S/C12H12N2S/c13-9-1-5-11(6-2-9)15-12-7-3-10(14)4-8-12/h1-8H,13-14H2 Key: ICNFHJVPAJKPHW-UHFFFAOYSA-N
- SMILES: C1=CC(=CC=C1N)SC2=CC=C(C=C2)N

Properties
Chemical formula	C_{12}H_{12}N_{2}S
Molar mass	216.3 g/mol
Appearance	Brown-brown violet powder or needles
Density	1.26 g/cm^{3}
Melting point	105 to 107 °C (221 to 225 °F; 378 to 380 K)
Boiling point	464.8 °C (868.6 °F; 738.0 K) @ 760mmHg

Hazards
Flash point	234.9 °C (454.8 °F; 508.0 K)
- Except where otherwise noted, data are given for materials in their standard state (at 25 °C [77 °F], 100 kPa). verify (what is ?) Infobox references

4,4′-Thiodianiline (TDA) is the organosulfur compound with the formula (H2NC6H4)2S. It is classified as a diamine and a thioether. It typically appears as an (off-)white solid powder. An analogue of TDA is the drug dapsone, for which the sulphur species is oxidised.

== Synthesis ==
Sulfur is boiled in excess aniline over several hours to produce three isomers (1,1′; 1,4; 4,4′) of TDA. The same journal documents syntheses of similar and overlapping compounds by Merz and Weith in 1871, and K. A. Hoffman in 1894. A study by Nietzki and Bothof shows indications that including an oxide of lead may maximize the yield of the 4,4′ variant that this page refers to.

== Uses ==
TDA was used as a chemical intermediate in the production of three dyes: CI mordant yellow 16, milling red G and milling red FR, as well as the medicine Dapsone. TDA has also been used in the synthesis of polyimine vitrimers.

== Production ==
TDA is no longer produced in the USA.

== Toxicity ==
TDA has caused mutations in some strains of Salmonella typhimurium and has caused tumors in laboratory mice and rats.

== Related compounds ==
- 4,4'-Oxydianiline
- 4,4'-Methylenedianiline
- Dapsone
