= 4,4'-Methylenedianiline =

4,4′-Methylenedianiline

Names
- Preferred IUPAC name 4,4′-Methylenedianiline
- Other names MDA dadpm 4,4′-Diaminodiphenylmethane; 4,4′-Methylenebisbenzenamine para,para′-Diaminodiphenylmethane; Dianilinomethane; 4,4′-Diphenylmethanediamine Bis(4-aminophenyl)methane

Identifiers
CAS Number	101-77-9
3D model (JSmol)	Interactive image
ChEBI	CHEBI:32506
ChEMBL	ChEMBL85728
ChemSpider	7296
ECHA InfoCard	100.002.705
EC Number	202-974-4
KEGG	C14288
PubChem CID	7577
RTECS number	BY5425000
UNII	GG5LL7OBZC
UN number	2651
CompTox Dashboard (EPA)	DTXSID6022422
- InChI: InChI=1S/C13H14N2/c14-12-5-1-10(2-6-12)9-11-3-7-13(15)8-4-11/h1-8H,9,14-15H2 Key: YBRVSVVVWCFQMG-UHFFFAOYSA-N; InChI=1/C13H14N2/c14-12-5-1-10(2-6-12)9-11-3-7-13(15)8-4-11/h1-8H,9,14-15H2 Key: YBRVSVVVWCFQMG-UHFFFAOYAE
- SMILES: c1cc(N)ccc1Cc2ccc(N)cc2

Properties
Chemical formula	C_{13}H_{14}N_{2}
Molar mass	198.269 g·mol^{−1}
Appearance	Colorless solid
Odor	faint, amine-like
Density	1.05 g/cm^{3} (100°C)
Melting point	89 °C (192 °F; 362 K)
Boiling point	398 to 399 °C (748 to 750 °F; 671 to 672 K)
Solubility in water	0.125 g/100 ml (20 °C)
Vapor pressure	0.0000002 mmHg (20°C)

Hazards
- Occupational safety and health (OHS/OSH)
Main hazards	potential carcinogen
- GHS labelling
Pictograms	(GHS08: Health hazard) (GHS07: Exclamation mark) (GHS09: Environmental hazard)
Signal word	Danger
Hazard statements	H317, H341, H350, H370, H373, H411
Precautionary statements	P201, P260, P273, P280, P308+P313
Flash point	190 °C; 374 °F; 463 K
- NIOSH (US health exposure limits)
PEL (Permissible)	TWA 0.010 ppm ST 0.100 ppm
REL (Recommended)	Ca
IDLH (Immediate danger)	Ca [N.D.]
- Except where otherwise noted, data are given for materials in their standard state (at 25 °C [77 °F], 100 kPa). verify (what is ?) Infobox references

4,4′-Methylenedianiline (MDA) is an organic compound with the formula CH_{2}(C_{6}H_{4}NH_{2})_{2}. It is a colorless solid, although commercial samples can appear yellow or brown. It is produced on an industrial scale, mainly as a precursor to polyurethanes.

== Synthesis and applications ==
In the industrial production, MDA is produced by reaction of formaldehyde and aniline in the presence of hydrochloric acid.

MDA is a common monomer in the synthesis of polymer materials. These include polyamides, polyimides and polyimines. MDA is also used extensively as a precursor to methylene diphenyl diisocyanate (MDI). Here, MDA is treated with phosgene to produce MDI. MDI, in turn, is a precursor to many polyurethane foams. Lower quantities are used as hardeners in epoxy resins and adhesives, as well as in the production of high-performance polymers. Additionally, hydrogenation of MDA can be performed to produce 4,4,diaminodicyclohexylmethane, which is also used in polymer chemistry.

MDA can also be applied as a bidentate (bridging) ligand in the formation of metal-coordination complexes.

== Safety ==
MDA is considered a potential occupational carcinogen by the US National Institute for Occupational Safety and Health. The Occupational Safety and Health Administration has set a permissible exposure limit at 0.01 ppm over an eight-hour time-weighted average, and a short-term exposure limit at 0.1 ppm.

It is suspected carcinogen. It is included in the "substances of very high concern" list of the European Chemicals Agency (ECHA). The compound was blamed in a mass poisoning in the vicinity of Epping, Essex, United Kingdom during 1965 during which 84 individuals were poisoned through accidental contamination of flour used to make bread.

== Related compounds ==
- 4,4'-Thiodianiline
- 4,4'-Oxydianiline
- Dapsone
