= Disperse blue dye =

Group of synthetic dyes

Disperse blue dyes are blue-colored disperse dyes. Disperse dyes are used to color textiles. Disperse blue dyes are used to produce blue and other dark colors. Like other disperse dyes, they are only slightly soluble in water. However, they can be a source of water pollution.

Disperse blue dyes, especially Disperse Blue 106 and Disperse Blue 124, have a higher than usual prevalence of textile dermatitis. This means that people who are allergic to the dyes may develop allergic symptoms (e.g., a rash) when they wear clothes that have been colored with these dyes.

== Types ==
There are hundreds of disperse blue dyes. This table lists only a few. Some disperse dyes are also solvent dyes; for example, Disperse Blue 1 is the same chemical as Solvent Blue 18.

Partial list of disperse blue dyes
Colour Index Generic Number	CAS number	Type	Concerns	Reference
Disperse Blue 1	2475-45-8	Anthraquinone	Allergy risk, water pollution	
Disperse Blue 3	2475-46-9		Allergy risk, aqueous toxicity	
Disperse Blue 7	3179-90-6		Allergy risk, water pollution	
Disperse Blue 26			Allergy risk, water pollution	
Disperse Blue 35	12222-75-2		Allergy risk	
Disperse Blue 74		Methine dyes		
Disperse Blue 79			Aqueous toxicity	
Disperse Blue 102	12222-97-8		Allergy risk, water pollution	
Disperse Blue 106	12223-01-7		Textile allergy, water pollution	
Disperse Blue 124	61951-51-7	Azo dye	Textile allergy, water pollution	
Disperse Blue 165		Cyano-substituted azo dye		
Disperse Blue 183		Cyano-substituted azo dye	Water pollution	
Disperse Blue 257		Cyano-substituted azo dye		
Disperse Blue 291			Water pollution	
Disperse Blue 373		Azo dye	Water pollution	

== Uses ==
Disperse blue dyes are used for dyeing synthetic fibers, such as fabric made from nylon or polyester.

== Allergies ==
Some patch testing kits for allergens include a mix of Disperse Blue 106 and Disperse Blue 124, and other colors can be tested if a textile dye allergy is suspected. Treatment mostly involves not wearing dark-colored synthetic clothing.

Although allergies to dyes are not very common, the disperse blue dyes are among the most common textile allergies. The American Contact Dermatitis Society named it their Allergen of the Year in 2000.
