= Chrome Azurol S =

Microbial stain

Names
- Preferred IUPAC name Trisodium 5-[(E)-(3-carboxy-5-methyl-4-oxocyclohexa-2,5-dien-1-ylidene)(2,6-dichloro-3-sulfonatophenyl)methyl]-3-methyl-2-oxidobenzoate
- Other names: Mordant Blue 29; C.I. 43825; Alberon

Identifiers
CAS Number	1667-99-8
3D model (JSmol)	Interactive image
ChEMBL	ChEMBL377545
ChemSpider	21159525
ECHA InfoCard	100.015.262
EC Number	216-787-0
PubChem CID	54694372
UNII	Y6C592EY5D
CompTox Dashboard (EPA)	DTXSID50889367
- InChI: InChI=1S/C23H16Cl2O9S.3Na/c1-9-5-11(7-13(20(9)26)22(28)29)17(12-6-10(2)21(27)14(8-12)23(30)31)18-15(24)3-4-16(19(18)25)35(32,33)34;;;/h3-8,26H,1-2H3,(H,28,29)(H,30,31)(H,32,33,34);;;/q;3*+1/p-3/b17-12+;;; Key: FUIZKNBTOOKONL-DPSBJRLESA-K
- SMILES: CC1=CC(=CC(=C1[O-])C(=O)[O-])C(=C2C=C(C(=O)C(=C2)C(=O)O)C)C3=C(C=CC(=C3Cl)S(=O)(=O)[O-])Cl.[Na+].[Na+].[Na+]

Properties
Chemical formula	C_{23}H_{13}Cl_{2}Na_{3}O_{9}S
Molar mass	605.28 g·mol^{−1}
- Except where otherwise noted, data are given for materials in their standard state (at 25 °C [77 °F], 100 kPa). Infobox references

Chrome Azurol S is a histological dye used in biomedical research. Chrome Azural S (CAS) is a common spectrophotometric reagent for detection of certain metals like aluminum which can be toxic in excess and can contribute to people with neurodegenerative disorders. CAS is used to provide quantitative and qualitative information on molecules of interest like aluminum and siderophores. Qualitatively a color change can be observed while also allowing to quantitatively determine concentration of certain ions.
