= Black 7984 =

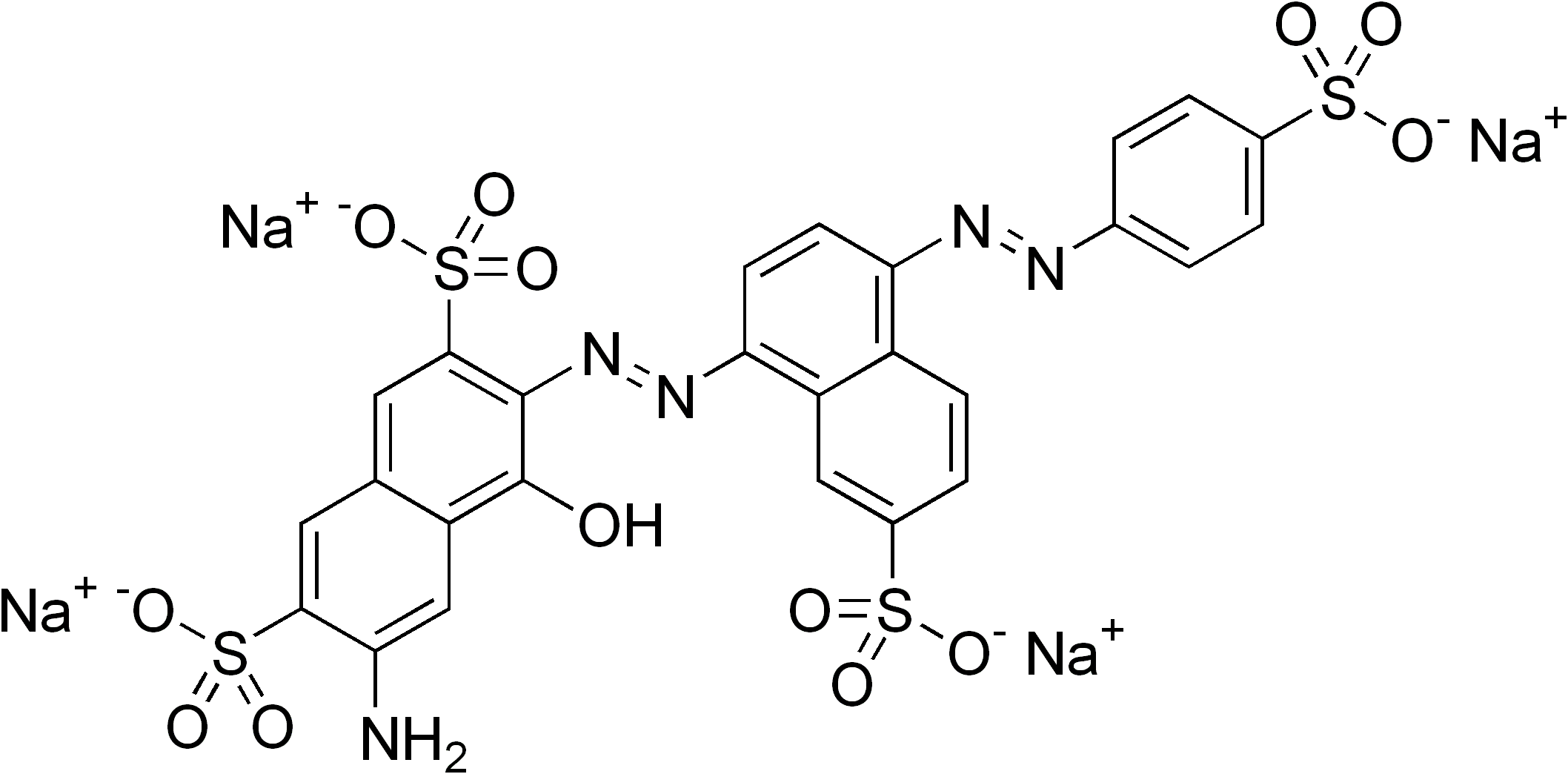

Names
- IUPAC name Tetrasodium 6-amino-4-hydroxy-3-[[7-sulfonato-4-[(4-sulfonatophenyl)azo]-1-naphthyl]azo]naphthalene-2,7-disulfonate
- Other names: Food Black 2; C.I. 27755

Identifiers
CAS Number	2118-39-0; acid: 25738-38-9
3D model (JSmol)	Interactive image; acid: Interactive image
ChemSpider	acid: 14306907
ECHA InfoCard	100.016.661
EC Number	218-326-9
PubChem CID	14047491
UNII	4SA5S34DWJ
CompTox Dashboard (EPA)	DTXSID40879792
- InChI: InChI=1S/C26H19N5O13S4.4Na/c27-20-12-18-13(9-23(20)47(39,40)41)10-24(48(42,43)44)25(26(18)32)31-30-22-8-7-21(17-6-5-16(11-19(17)22)46(36,37)38)29-28-14-1-3-15(4-2-14)45(33,34)35;;;;/h1-12,30H,27H2,(H,33,34,35)(H,36,37,38)(H,39,40,41)(H,42,43,44);;;;/q;4*+1/p-4/b29-28?,31-25-;;;; Key: XAOPCPOUYMCJFA-PEEPPZCGSA-J; acid: InChI=1S/C26H19N5O13S4/c27-20-12-18-13(9-23(20)47(39,40)41)10-24(48(42,43)44)25(26(18)32)31-30-22-8-7-21(17-6-5-16(11-19(17)22)46(36,37)38)29-28-14-1-3-15(4-2-14)45(33,34)35/h1-12,32H,27H2,(H,33,34,35)(H,36,37,38)(H,39,40,41)(H,42,43,44)/b29-28+,31-30+ Key: DUUHLAZWLLCPSP-DUJDKOHPSA-N
- SMILES: [O-]S(C(C=C4)=CC=C4/N=N/C(C=C2)=C3C(C=C(S([O-])(=O)=O)C=C3)=C2/N=N/C1=C(S([O-])(=O)=O)C=C(C=C(S([O-])(=O)=O)C(N)=C5)C5=C1O)(=O)=O.[Na+].[Na+].[Na+].[Na+]; acid: Nc1cc2c(O)c(/N=N/c3ccc(/N=N/c4ccc(S(=O)(=O)O)cc4)c4ccc(S(=O)(=O)O)cc34)c(S(=O)(=O)O)cc2cc1S(=O)(=O)O

Properties
Chemical formula	C_{26}H_{15}N_{5}Na_{4}O_{13}S_{4}
Molar mass	825.63 g·mol^{−1}
- Except where otherwise noted, data are given for materials in their standard state (at 25 °C [77 °F], 100 kPa). verify (what is ?) Infobox references

Black 7984, Food Black 2, or C.I. 27755, is a brown-to-black synthetic diazo dye. It is often used as the tetrasodium salt.

== Production ==
In the synthesis of Food Black 2, sulfanilic acid 1 is first reacted with sodium nitrite under acid diazotization conditions, and the resulting diazonium salt 2 is subjected to azo coupling with 8-aminonaphthalene-2-sulfonic acid 3. The monoazo dye 4 is subsequently diazotized to form the diazonium compound 5 and then reacted with 3-amino-5-hydroxynaphthalene-2,7-disulfonic acid 6 to yield the diazo dye 7.

== Use ==
Under the designation E 152, Food Black 2 was approved in the EU as a food colorant by Directive 62/2645/EEC until the end of 1976.

Food Black 2 is approved in the EU under Regulation (EC) No 1223/2009 as a colorant in cosmetics. Its use as a hair dye is not permitted.

Together with Acid Yellow 23 and Acid Red 52, Food Black 2 is used in inks for inkjet printing.

Black 7984 is also used in cosmetics.

== See also ==
- Carbon black
