= Red 2G =

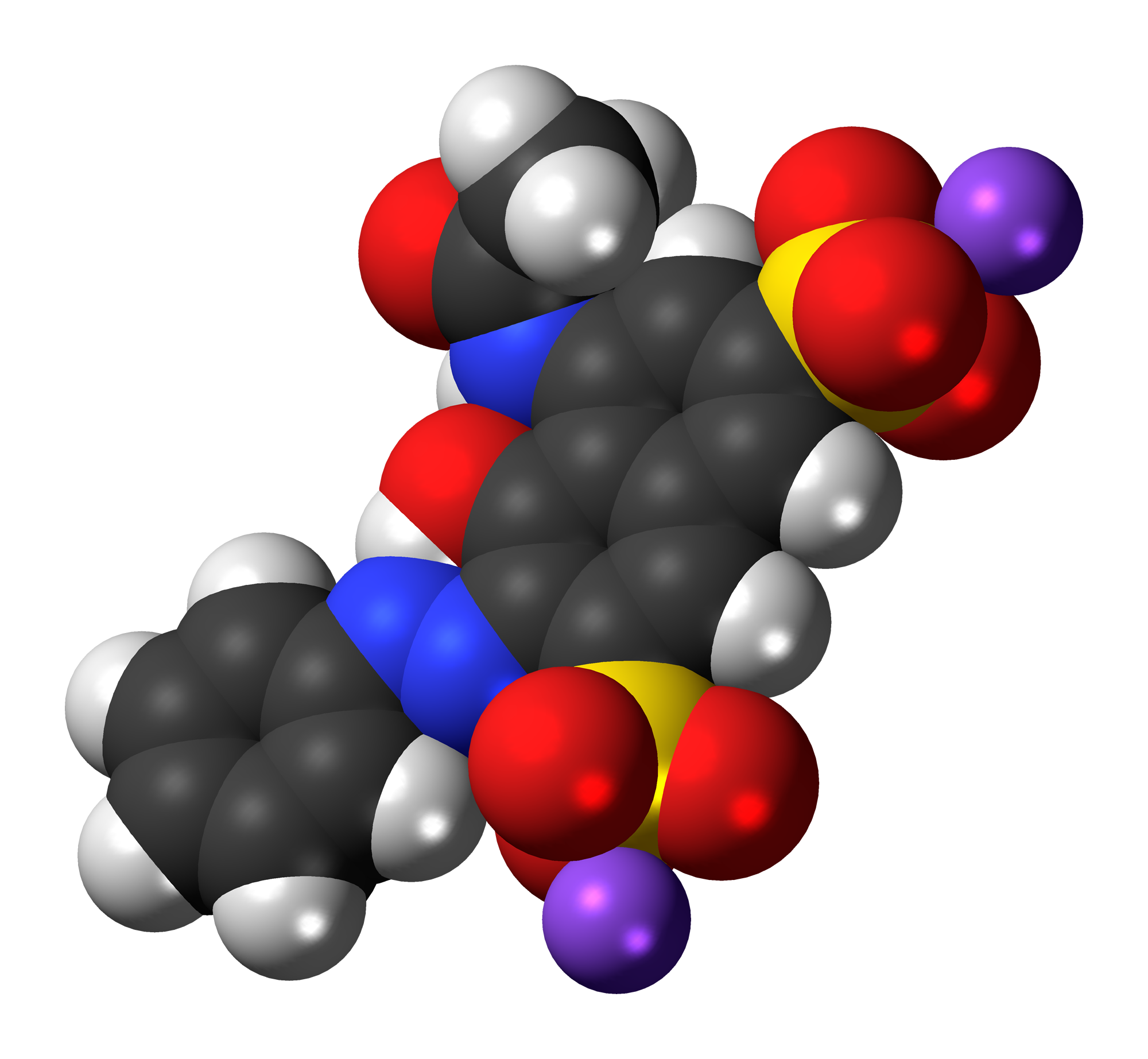

Names
- Other names: Acid Red 1; Food Red 10; Amidonaphthol red G; azogeranine; azophloxine; azofloxin; C.I. 18050

Identifiers
CAS Number	3734-67-6
3D model (JSmol)	Interactive image
ChemSpider	21106472
ECHA InfoCard	100.020.999
E number	E128 (colours)
PubChem CID	6507024
UNII	3365R6427R
CompTox Dashboard (EPA)	DTXSID9044663
- InChI: InChI=1S/C18H15N3O8S2/c1-10(22)19-14-9-13(30(24,25)26)7-11-8-15(31(27,28)29)17(18(23)16(11)14)21-20-12-5-3-2-4-6-12/h2-9,23H,1H3,(H,19,22)(H,24,25,26)(H,27,28,29)/p-2/b21-20+ Key: RSNSKUBBVCGSND-QZQOTICOSA-L; InChI=1/C18H15N3O8S2/c1-10(22)19-14-9-13(30(24,25)26)7-11-8-15(31(27,28)29)17(18(23)16(11)14)21-20-12-5-3-2-4-6-12/h2-9,23H,1H3,(H,19,22)(H,24,25,26)(H,27,28,29)/p-2/b21-20+ Key: RSNSKUBBVCGSND-OLKPTRFBBB
- SMILES: CC(=O)Nc2cc(cc3cc(c(/N=N/c1ccccc1)c(O)c23)S([O-])(=O)=O)S([O-])(=O)=O

Properties
Chemical formula	C_{18}H_{13}N_{3}O_{8}S_{2}
Molar mass	463.44 g·mol^{−1}
Solubility in water	18 g/100 mL (20 °C)
Solubility	1 g/ 100 mL glycerol Negligible in ethanol
- Except where otherwise noted, data are given for materials in their standard state (at 25 °C [77 °F], 100 kPa). verify (what is ?) Infobox references

Red 2G is a synthetic red azo dye. It is soluble in water and slightly soluble in glycerol. It usually comes as a disodium salt of 8-acetamido-1-hydroxy-2-phenylazonaphthalene-3,6 disulfonate. It is assigned the E number E128 in Europe, although it's use is banned.

== Preparation ==
Red 2G is produced by azo coupling of Acetyl-H acid and diazonium derivative of Aniline under basic conditions:

== Uses ==
=== Food dye ===
In the European Union, Red 2G was used as a food dye (E number E128). However, it was only permitted for use in breakfast sausages with a minimum cereal content of 6% and burger meat with a minimum vegetable and/or cereal content of 4%.

Following safety concerns raised by the European Food Safety Authority (EFSA) in its opinion of 5 July 2007, the European Commission has prepared a draft Regulation to suspend use of E128 as a food colouring. This proposed course of action was unanimously approved by European Union Member States at a meeting of the Standing Committee of the Food Chain and Animal Health (Section Toxicological Safety of the Food Chain) on 20 July 2007. and Commission Regulation (EC) No 884/2007 on emergency measures suspending the use of E 128 Red 2G as food colour was published in the Official Journal of the European Union on 27 July 2007. It was banned due to its metabolite, aniline, being deemed as carcinogenic by the EFSA.

Red 2G is also banned in United States, Australia, Canada, Japan, Norway, and Malaysia. It was banned in Israel in August 2007.

It is relatively insensitive to the bleaching effect of sulfur dioxide (E220) and sodium metabisulfite (E223). In the intestines, Red 2G can be converted to the toxic compound aniline, so there are concerns Red 2G may ultimately interfere with blood haemoglobin, as well as cause cancer.

=== Inks ===
It is also used as a dye for coatings, inks, paper, crepe paper, and fine tissue.

=== Histology ===
Red 2G can be also used for staining in histology, though rarely, e.g. as a component of Masson's trichrome.

== Potential health risks ==
In July 2007, the EFSA established that E128 is potentially carcinogenic because it forms aniline in the body when consumed. The pressure group, The Food Commission, said there had been concerns about Red 2G going back decades and it was suspected of being a carcinogen in the 1980s.
