= 4,4'-Oxydianiline =

4,4′-Oxydianiline
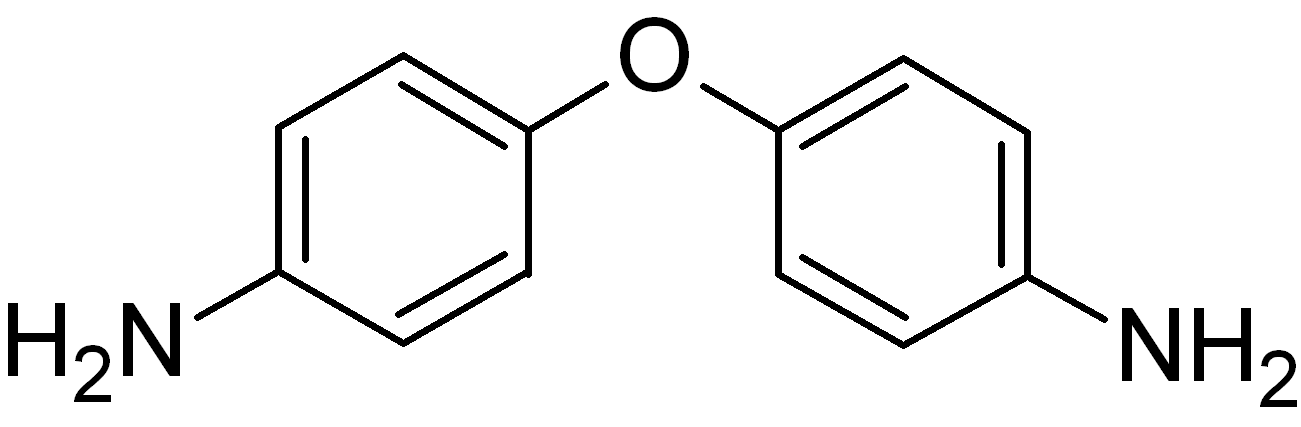

Names
- Preferred IUPAC name 4,4′-Oxydianiline
- Other names 4,4′-Diaminodiphenyl ether; 4-Aminophenyl ether; 4,4′-Oxybisbenzenamine; Bis(4-aminophenyl) ether; 4,4′-ODA

Identifiers
CAS Number	101-80-4
3D model (JSmol)	Interactive image
ChEBI	CHEBI:34384
ChEMBL	ChEMBL354663
ChemSpider	7298
ECHA InfoCard	100.002.707
EC Number	202-977-0
KEGG	C14759
PubChem CID	7579
UNII	28DLB4Z70T
UN number	3077
CompTox Dashboard (EPA)	DTXSID0021094
- InChI: InChI=1S/C12H12N2O/c13-9-1-5-11(6-2-9)15-12-7-3-10(14)4-8-12/h1-8H,13-14H2 Key: HLBLWEWZXPIGSM-UHFFFAOYSA-N; InChI=1/C12H12N2O/c13-9-1-5-11(6-2-9)15-12-7-3-10(14)4-8-12/h1-8H,13-14H2 Key: HLBLWEWZXPIGSM-UHFFFAOYAM
- SMILES: O(c1ccc(N)cc1)c2ccc(cc2)N

Properties
Chemical formula	C_{12}H_{12}N_{2}O
Molar mass	200.24 g/mol
Appearance	Colorless crystalline solid
Density	1.417 g/cm³
Melting point	188 to 192 °C (370 to 378 °F; 461 to 465 K)
Boiling point	219 °C (426 °F; 492 K)
Solubility in water	Insoluble

Hazards
- GHS labelling
Pictograms	(GHS06: Toxic) (GHS08: Health hazard) (GHS09: Environmental hazard)
Signal word	Danger
Hazard statements	H301, H311, H331, H340, H350, H361f, H411
Precautionary statements	P201, P202, P261, P264, P270, P271, P273, P280, P281, P301+P310, P302+P352, P304+P340, P308+P313, P311, P312, P321, P322, P330, P361, P363, P391, P403+P233, P405, P501
NFPA 704 (fire diamond)	2
Flash point	219 °C (426 °F; 492 K)
- Except where otherwise noted, data are given for materials in their standard state (at 25 °C [77 °F], 100 kPa). verify (what is ?) Infobox references

4,4′-Oxydianiline (ODA) is an organic compound with the formula O(C_{6}H_{4}NH_{2})_{2}. It is an ether derivative of aniline. This colourless solid is a useful monomer and cross-linking agent for polymers, especially the polyimides, such as Kapton.

== Uses ==
The primary use lies in the production of polyimide and poly(ester)imide resins. These resins are used for their temperature-resistant properties and are utilized in products including wire enamels, coatings, film, adhesives, insulating varnishes, coated fabrics, flame-retardant fibers, oil sealants and retainers, insulation for cables and printed circuits, and laminates and composite for aerospace vehicles. 4,4′-Oxydianiline is used in the production of a wide variety of polymer resins.

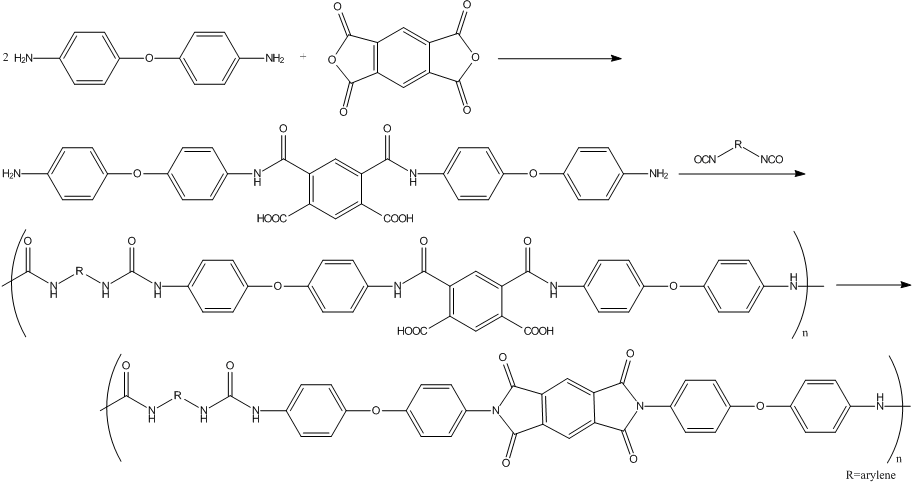

A specific reaction involving industrial use of 4,4′-oxydianiline is in the production of thermostable poly(amideurea) acids, which can be prepared from 4,4′-oxydianiline, pyromellitic dianhydride, and diisocyanates. These poly(amideurea) acids can be used as intermediates in the syntheses of poly(imideurea)s:

Other applications of 4,4′-oxydianiline include the production of poly(amide)imide resins (which are used in the manufacture of heat-resistant wire enamels and coatings), as an intermediate in the manufacture of epoxy resins and adhesives, and in the production of aromatic polyether imides.

== Research ==
Its use in the production of polyimine vitrimers and related materials has also been proposed.

== Related compounds ==
- 4,4'-Thiodianiline
- 4,4'-Methylenedianiline
- Dapsone
