= Bromopyrogallol red =

Names
- Preferred IUPAC name 2′,7′-Dibromo-3′,4′,5′,6′-tetrahydroxy-1H-1λ^{6}-spiro[[2,1]benzoxathiole-3,9′-xanthene]-1,1-dione
- Other names: 3,3′-Dibromosulfongallein; Dibromopyrogallolsulfonphthalein; Dibromopyrogallolsulfonphthaleine

Identifiers
CAS Number	16574-43-9
3D model (JSmol)	Interactive image
ChemSpider	77105
ECHA InfoCard	100.036.923
EC Number	240-632-6
PubChem CID	85495
UNII	A6NS5EJ2GF
CompTox Dashboard (EPA)	DTXSID0066082
- InChI: InChI=1S/C19H10Br2O8S/c20-10-5-8-17(15(24)13(10)22)28-18-9(6-11(21)14(23)16(18)25)19(8)7-3-1-2-4-12(7)30(26,27)29-19/h1-6,22-25H
- SMILES: Brc5c(O)c(O)c4Oc1c(O)c(O)c(Br)cc1C3(OS(=O)(=O)c2ccccc23)c4c5

Properties
Chemical formula	C_{19}H_{10}Br_{2}O_{8}S
Molar mass	558.15 g·mol^{−1}
Appearance	Powder, dark brown
Melting point	300 °C (572 °F; 573 K)

Hazards
- Occupational safety and health (OHS/OSH)
Main hazards	Not a dangerous substance according to Directive 67/548/EEC
NFPA 704 (fire diamond)	0 1 0
Safety data sheet (SDS)	MSDS
- Except where otherwise noted, data are given for materials in their standard state (at 25 °C [77 °F], 100 kPa). Infobox references

Bromopyrogallol red is frequently used in analytical chemistry as a reagent for spectrophometric analysis and as an complexometric indicator.

== Uses, behaviors, and properties ==
Bromopyrogallol red is commonly used in analytical chemistry as a spectrophotometric reagent and complexometric indicator. When metal ion complexation reactions are carried out in the presence of quaternary ammonium salts, the analytical possibilities with bromopyrogallol red are even greater. Doing this also increases the color contrast and sensitivity of many elements for analysis. In addition, bromopyrogallol red can also be widely used as a metallochromic indicator. Bromopyrogallol red has been used as a complexometric indicator for determination of Bi, Cd, Co, Mg, and Mn.

Bromopyrogallol red is protonized in 1 M H_{2}SO_{4} solution and changes gradually to its ionized forms in alkaline solution. In its neutral form, bromopyrogallol red is bipolar ion, containing a protonized carbonyl group as well as a dissociated sulfonate group. Through testing at isobestic points, it has been determined that bromopyrogallol red is a stronger acid than Pyrogallol Red. In the presence of ammonia salts, the bathochromic shifts increase. The hydrophilic group on the ammonia salts also change the dissociation of the reagent to be used with bromopyrogallol red to a more acidic region.

Bromopyrogallol red is also a triphenylmethane indictor. An efficient purification can be obtained by chromatographic separation on a polyamide column prewashed with HCl. Purity can then be checked by thin layer chromatography on a microcrystalline cellulose plate using either a system of butanol–acetic acid–water, n-propanol–water, or methanol–water. Another use of Bromopyrogallol red is as an indicator for titrations with Cd (pH 9.3), Mg (pH 10), Mn (pH10), and lanthanides (pH 7). It also commonly used in back-titrations with Co, Cu, Ga, Pb, and Th. It is usually used as a 0.05% solution in 50% ethanol when used as an indicator.

In pharmacy, bromopyrogallol red serves to bind proteins together. It is used in 30–100 μmol/L concentrations. It has been used in the electrophoretic mobility shift assay and p50 and title comp preincubated in assay buffer, pH 7.5 (room temp., 5 min).

== Applications and research ==
Bromopyrogallol red has numerous applications with analytical chemistry, such as spectrophotometric analysis and as a complexometric indicator.

=== Spectrophotometric determination ===
By reacting the bromopyrogallol red with niobium(V) in a tartrate medium at pH 6.0, an intense blue coloured 3:1 reagent was formed. The sensitivity and conditional selectivity of bromopyrogallol red was also studied and results show that trace amounts of silver can be detected from the formation of a ternary complex between 1,10-phenanthroline, bromopyrogallol red and silver ion. This is because of the two adjacent phenol groups in the structure of bromopyrogallol red.

Bromopyrogallol red is used as indicating reagent for rare-earth elements. It is chosen under the spectrophotometric determination method and used as indicator because the reagent forms different visible color. Bromopyrogallol red forms blue to violet-blue complexes with yttrium and cerium. It also has shows orange yellow in strong acid solution, claret red in nearly neutral solution and blue in alkaline solution.

=== Increased cell efficiency ===
By forming complex ion of bromopyrogallol red and iron(II) compounds, the efficiency of cell can be increased. The lowest transition in the bromopyrogallol have a MLCT character, which greatly increase the electron sensitivity in Iron (II) and thus the complexation of bromopyrogallol ligand with iron(II) bisoxalato moiety was determined to increase the cell efficiency to a higher level.

=== Hydrogen donor substrate for peroxidase ===
Bromopyrogallol red is designed to be a hydrogen donor for peroxidase. Instead of an indicator, bromopyrogallol red is now used as a catalyst, and its reaction rate depends upon enzyme and substrate concentrations. With the HRP-H_{2}O_{2}-BPR catalytic system, the bromopyrogallol red is determined to be an efficient reagent and quantitation of HRP can be performed. It will increase the reaction rate of H_{2}O_{2} and glucose.

== Characterization ==
Bromopyrogallol red is a green to dark brown crystalline powder. It produces a spectrum in dimethyl sulfoxide with an absorption maxima at 412 and 523 nm. When used with an ethanol solvent, the spectrum ranges from 400 to 540 nm; in H_{2}O it is 360–530 nm, and in 1,4-dioxane and water with a ratio of 4:2, gives an absorption maxima at 470 nm. It is soluble in water and can be stored at 4 °C.

== Safety ==
As a complexometric indicator for determination of : Bi, Cd, Co, Mg, Mn and rare earths, Bromopyrogallol red is not classified as harmful by ingestion. Direct contact with eye may cause tearing or conjunctive redness. It will also cause skin irritation; the entry of bromopyrogallol red into the blood stream may produce systemic injury. The material should also avoid contamination with oxidizing agents like nitrates, oxidizing acids, chlorine bleaches, pool chlorine etc.

== See also ==
- Benedict's reagent
- Tollens' reagent
- Lucas' reagent
- Drug checking
