= Dye-ligand affinity chromatography =

Chemical separation technique

Dye-ligand affinity chromatography is one of the Affinity chromatography techniques used for protein purification of a complex mixture. Like general chromatography, but using dyes to apply on a support matrix of a column as the stationary phase that will allow a range of proteins with similar active sites to bind to, refers to as pseudo-affinity. Synthetic dyes are used to mimic substrates or cofactors binding to the active sites of proteins which can be further enhanced to target more specific proteins. Follow with washing, the process of removing other non-target molecules, then eluting out target proteins out by changing pH or manipulate the salt concentration. The column can be reused many times due to the stability of immobilized dyes. It can carry out in a conventional way by using as a packed column, or in high-performance liquid chromatography (HPLC) column.

== Discovery ==
The discovery of dye-ligand ability is from a blue dye called blue dextran. The blue dye is used as a void volume (V_{0}) marker for a gel filtration column. It has shown that the dye has a property to bind to some certain proteins like pyruvate kinase and elute out with the void volume. Later on, it was found that "cibacron blue FG3-A", reactive dye link to dextran, is responsible for the interaction with the proteins.

== Dye immobilization ==
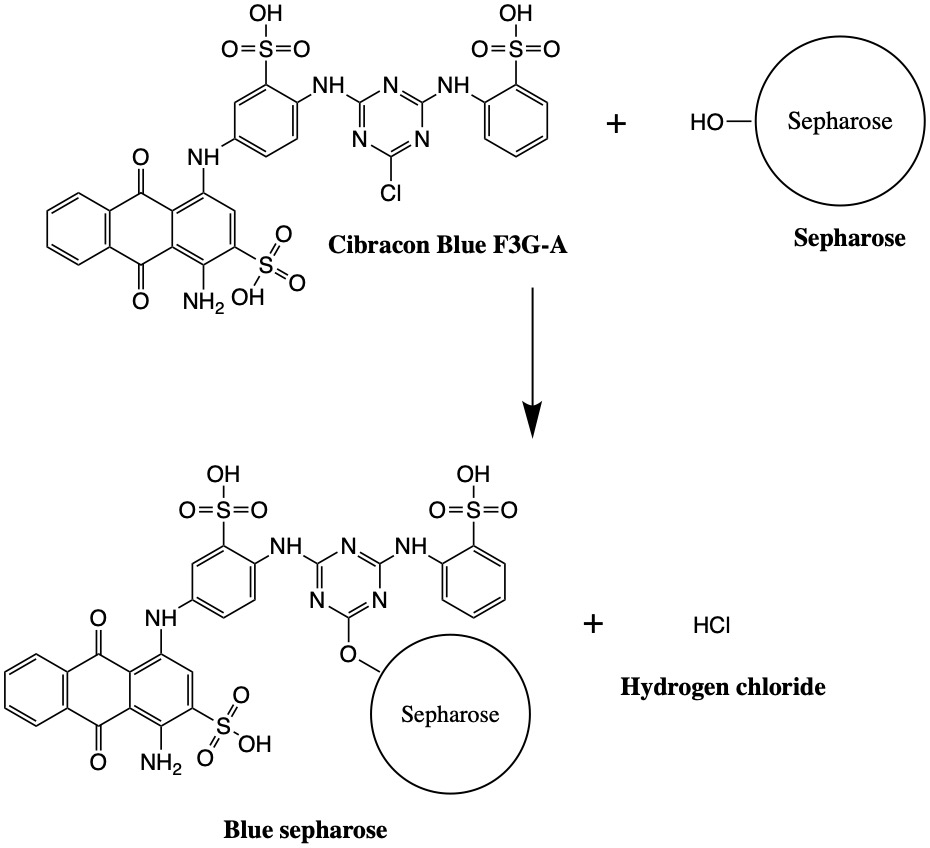

The dyes are immobilized on the column matrix effectively, since usually the dyes link to a monochlorotriazine or dichlorotriazine ring (triazine dye). This type of dyes works especially well on a support matrix with hydroxyl group. The commonly used supporting matrix would be cross-linked agarose (sepharose), sephadex, polyacrylamide, and silica.

An example for triazine linkage immobilization is Blue Sepharose, resulting from Cibacron blue FG3-A with monochlorotriazine covalently coupled with OH group of sepharose. This reaction form an ether linkage and also hydrogen chloride.

C_{29}H_{20}ClN_{7}O_{11}S_{3} + C_{24}H_{38}O_{19} → C_{53}H_{57}N_{7}O_{30}S_{3} + HCl

Cibacron Blue FG3-A + Sepharose → Blue Sepharose + HCl

== Reactive dyes ==
The dyes used in this type of chromatography are inexpensive and generally available as they are from textile industries called reactive dye. It contains chromophores that are often attached to a triazine ring. In textile industries, reactive dyes are used to dye material like cotton which is cellulose.

Commonly used reactive dyes for chromatography can be separated according to their color index name or functional group. Noted that each company has different trade names and slightly different formulas of the reactive dyes. Usually available commercially with sepharose as the supporting matrix in the form of packed columns.

=== Blue reactive dyes ===
==== Cibacron Blue F3GA ====
Cibacron Blue F3GA, Procion Blue HB, or Reactive blue 2 is a purinergic receptor antagonist, such as P2Y purinoceptor, and also an ATP receptor channels antagonist. It has a formula of C_{29}H_{20}ClN_{7}O_{11}S_{3} and a molecular weight of 774.2 g/mol. Cibacron blue is soluble in water and DMSO, however insoluble in ethanol. In water, saturated concentration is reached at 12.92 mM with the help of sonication. Cibacron Blue F3GA has a wide specificity for nucleotide-binding proteins or just a stereoselectivity electrostatic binding. It can be used to purify interferons, dehydrogenases, kinases, and serum albumin. For example, interferon purification from human gingival fibroblast extract using Cibacron Blue F3G-A on poly(2-hydroxyethyl methacrylate), the supporting matrix, in the form of cryogels. It has shown 97.6% purity of interferon.

==== Blue MX-R ====
Blue MX-R or Reactive Blue 4 has a formula of C_{23}H_{14}Cl_{2}N_{6}O_{8}S_{2} and a molecular weight of 637.4 g/mol. It contains dichlorotriazine ring to the chromophore unlike Cibacron Blue F3GA. For a large scale protein purification, Blue MX-R can be used to purify protein such as lactate dehydrogenase (LDH). In fast-protein liquid chromatography (FPLC) using Blue MX-R immobilized on poly(glycidyl methacrylate-co-ethylene dimethacrylate) beads, it was seen to separate lysozyme and bovine serum albumin (BSA), purified lysozyme from chicken albumin.

=== Red reactive dyes ===
==== Red HE-3B ====
Red HE-3B or Reactive Red 120 has a formula of C_{44}H_{30}Cl_{2}N_{14}O_{20}S_{6} and a molecular weight of 1338.1 g/mol, containing two monochlorotriazine rings. It is highly soluble in water. The dehydrogenases binding ability of Red HE-3B is greater to NADP+ dependent dehydrogenases than NAD+ dependent dehydrogenases, vice versa for Cibacron Blue F3G-A. It can be used to purify enterotoxins A, B, and C_{2} from Staphylococcus aureus using Procion Red HE-3B on sepharose, eluting out with 60 mM and 150 mM phosphate.

=== Yellow reactive dyes ===
==== Yellow H-A ====
Yellow H-A or Reactive Yellow 3 has a formula of C_{21}H_{17}ClN_{8}O_{7}S_{2} and a molecular weight of 593 g/mol, containing a monochlorotriazine ring. On agarose as supporting matrix, it was seen to purify cholesteryl ester transfer protein.

=== Brown reactive dyes ===
==== Brown MX-5BR ====
Brown MX-5BR or Reactive Brown 10 has a formula of C_{40}H_{19}Cl_{4}CrN_{12}Na_{2}O_{12}S_{2} and a molecular weight of 1163.6 g/mol, containing two dichlorotriazine rings. Brown MX-5BR, for example, can be used to purify lysozyme, phosphinothricin acetyltransferase. It also shown that it can elute tryptophanyl-tRNA synthetase using Trp as eluant, however, tryptophanyl-tRNA and tyrosyl-tRNA synthetase are the only t-RNA that can be elute out using Brown MX-5BR.
