= Yellow 2G =

Names
- IUPAC name Disodium 2,5-dichloro-4-[3-methyl-5-oxo-4-(4-sulfonatophenyl)diazenyl-4H-pyrazol-1-yl]benzenesulfonate
- Other names: Lissamine Fast Yellow; C.I. Acid Yellow 17; C.I. 18965; Light Fast Yellow 2G; C.I. Food Yellow 5; Acid Leather Yellow 2GL; Erio Flavine SX; Fenalan Yellow G; Erio Flavine 3G; Kayacyl Yellow GG

Identifiers
CAS Number	6359-98-4
3D model (JSmol)	Interactive image
ChEBI	tautomer: CHEBI:90206
ChemSpider	3490830
ECHA InfoCard	100.026.199
E number	E107 (colours)
PubChem CID	22842; acid: 4284331
UNII	Y428W9WW4D
CompTox Dashboard (EPA)	DTXSID6041719
- InChI: InChI=1S/C16H12Cl2N4O7S2.2Na/c1-8-15(20-19-9-2-4-10(5-3-9)30(24,25)26)16(23)22(21-8)13-6-12(18)14(7-11(13)17)31(27,28)29;;/h2-7,15H,1H3,(H,24,25,26)(H,27,28,29);;/q;2*+1/p-2 Key: FTZLWXQKVFFWLY-UHFFFAOYSA-L; acid: InChI=1S/C16H12Cl2N4O7S2/c1-8-15(20-19-9-2-4-10(5-3-9)30(24,25)26)16(23)22(21-8)13-6-12(18)14(7-11(13)17)31(27,28)29/h2-7,15H,1H3,(H,24,25,26)(H,27,28,29)/p-2/b20-19+ Key: DWYWPBYWDAZKNX-FMQUCBEESA-L
- SMILES: CC1=NN(C(=O)C1N=NC2=CC=C(C=C2)S(=O)(=O)[O-])C3=CC(=C(C=C3Cl)S(=O)(=O)[O-])Cl.[Na+].[Na+]

Properties
Chemical formula	C_{16}H_{10}N_{4}Na_{2}O_{7}S_{2}
Molar mass	480.38 g·mol^{−1}
- Except where otherwise noted, data are given for materials in their standard state (at 25 °C [77 °F], 100 kPa). verify (what is ?) Infobox references

Yellow 2G is a food coloring denoted by E number E107 with the color index CI18965. It has the appearance of a yellow powder, and it is soluble in water. It is a synthetic yellow azo dye.

It is not listed by the UK's Food Standards Agency among EU approved food additives. Its use is also banned in Austria, Canada, Japan, Norway, Sweden, Switzerland and the United States.
