= Pigment Red 179 =

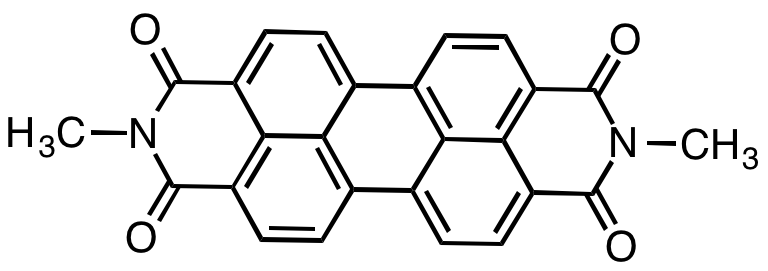

Names
- Preferred IUPAC name 2,9-Dimethylanthra[2,1,9-def:6,5,10-d′e′f′]diisoquinoline-1,3,8,10(2H,9H)-tetrone

Identifiers
CAS Number	5521-31-3
3D model (JSmol)	Interactive image
ChemSpider	71958
ECHA InfoCard	100.024.424
EC Number	226-866-1
PubChem CID	79657
UNII	2B7V5NT69F
CompTox Dashboard (EPA)	DTXSID9029273
- InChI: InChI=1S/C26H14N2O4/c1-27-23(29)15-7-3-11-13-5-9-17-22-18(26(32)28(2)25(17)31)10-6-14(20(13)22)12-4-8-16(24(27)30)21(15)19(11)12/h3-10H,1-2H3 Key: PJQYNUFEEZFYIS-UHFFFAOYSA-N
- SMILES: CN1C(=O)c2ccc3c4ccc5c6c4c(ccc6C(=O)N(C5=O)C)c7c3c2c(cc7)C1=O

Properties
Chemical formula	C_{26}H_{14}N_{2}O_{4}
Molar mass	418.40
- Except where otherwise noted, data are given for materials in their standard state (at 25 °C [77 °F], 100 kPa). Infobox references

Pigment Red 179 is an organic compound used as a pigment. Structurally, it is a derivative of perylene, produced from perylenetetracarboxylic dianhydride through derivatization with methylamine.

It is used in watercolor paints, usually labeled as Perylene Maroon.
