= Apocarotenal =

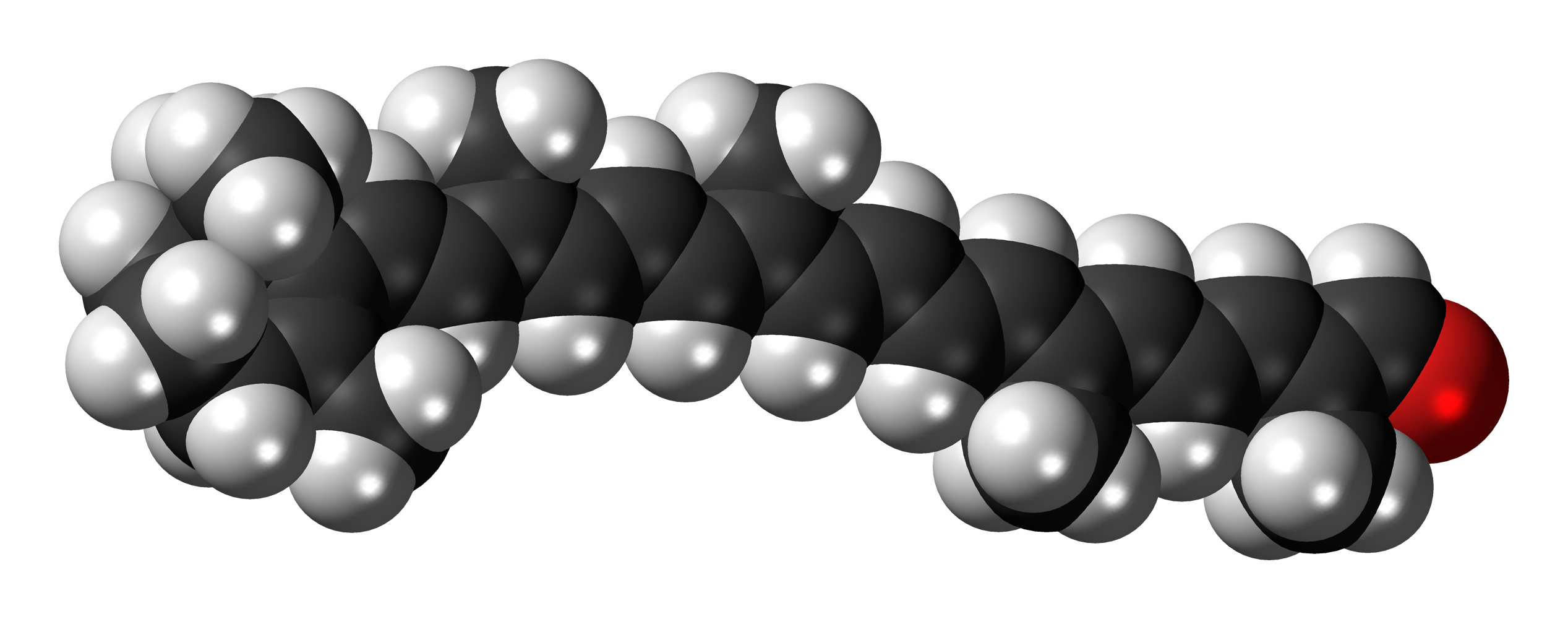

Names
- IUPAC name 8′-Apo-β-caroten-8′-al
- Systematic IUPAC name (2E,4E,6E,8E,10E,12E,14E,16E)-2,6,11,15-Tetramethyl-17-(2,6,6-trimethylcyclohex-1-en-1-yl)heptadeca-2,4,6,8,10,12,14,16-octaenal
- Other names: trans-beta-apo-8'-carotenal; C.I. Food Orange 6; E number 160E

Identifiers
CAS Number	1107-26-2
3D model (JSmol)	Interactive image; Interactive image
ChEBI	CHEBI:53154
ChemSpider	4585625
ECHA InfoCard	100.012.883
E number	E160e (colours)
PubChem CID	5478003
UNII	V22N3E2U32
CompTox Dashboard (EPA)	DTXSID20883251
- InChI: InChI=1S/C30H40O/c1-24(13-8-9-14-25(2)16-11-18-27(4)23-31)15-10-17-26(3)20-21-29-28(5)19-12-22-30(29,6)7/h8-11,13-18,20-21,23H,12,19,22H2,1-7H3/b9-8+,15-10+,16-11+,21-20+,24-13+,25-14+,26-17+,27-18+ Key: DFMMVLFMMAQXHZ-DOKBYWHISA-N; InChI=1S/C30H40O/c1-24(13-8-9-14-25(2)16-11-18-27(4)23-31)15-10-17-26(3)20-21-29-28(5)19-12-22-30(29,6)7/h8-11,13-18,20-21,23H,12,19,22H2,1-7H3/b9-8+,15-10+,16-11+,21-20+,24-13+,25-14+,26-17+,27-18+; Key: DFMMVLFMMAQXHZ-DOKBYWHISA-N
- SMILES: CC=1CCCC(C)(C)C=1/C=CC(\C)=C\C=C\C(\C)=C\C=C\C=C(/C)\C=C\C=C(/C)C=O; O=C\C(=C\C=C\C(=C\C=C\C=C(\C=C\C=C(\C=C\C1=C(\CCCC1(C)C)C)C)C)C)C

Properties
Chemical formula	C_{30}H_{40}O
Molar mass	416.649 g·mol^{−1}
- Except where otherwise noted, data are given for materials in their standard state (at 25 °C [77 °F], 100 kPa). verify (what is ?) Infobox references

Apocarotenal, or trans-β-apo-8'-carotenal, is a carotenoid found in spinach and citrus fruits. Like other carotenoids, apocarotenal plays a role as a precursor of vitamin A, even though it has 50% less pro-vitamin A activity than β-carotene. The empirical chemical formula for apocarotenal is C_{30}H_{40}O.

Apocarotenal has an orange to orange-red colour and is used in foods, pharmaceuticals and cosmetic products. Depending on the product forms, apocarotenal is used in fat-based foods (such as margarine, sauces, and salad dressing), beverages, dairy products, and sweets. Its E number is E160e and it is approved for use as a food additive in the US, EU, Australia, and New Zealand.
