= The Food Commission =

The Food Commission is an independent food watchdog campaigning for safer, healthier food in the UK. The commission is primarily funded by public subscriptions to their campaign journal, the Food Magazine.
