= D&C Red 33 =

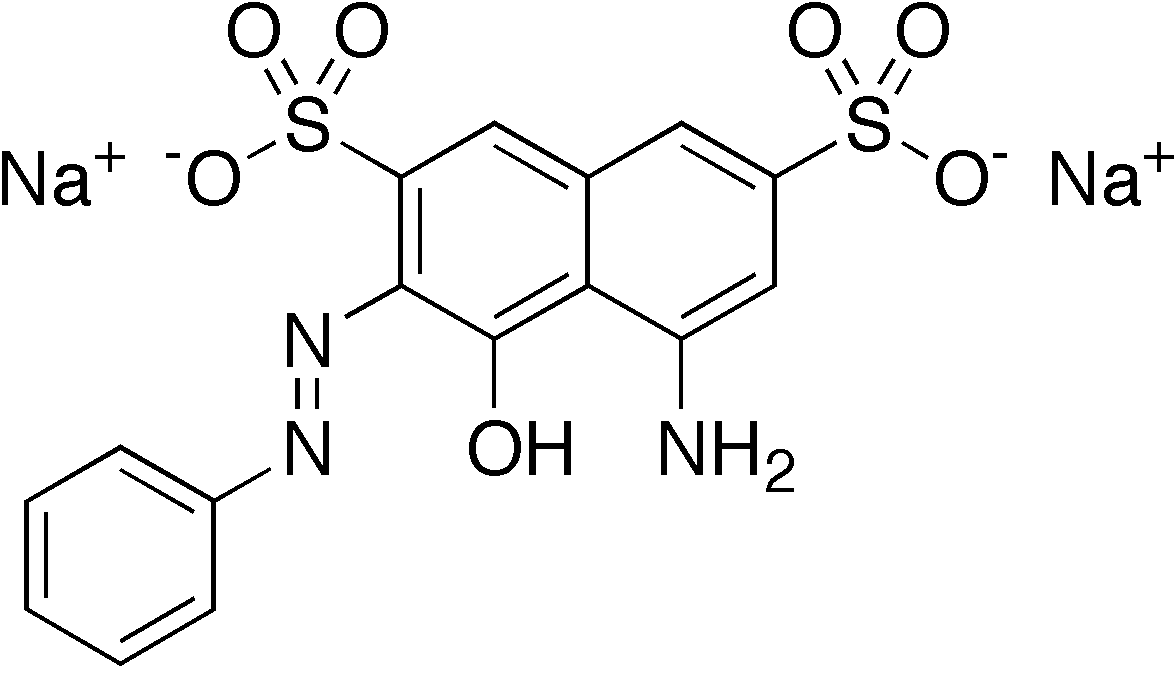

Names
- IUPAC name Disodium 5-amino-4-hydroxy-3-(phenylazo)-naphthalene-2,7-disulfonate
- Other names D&C Red 33, Acid Red 33, Azo grenadine, Azo fuchsine, Acid fuchsine D, Redusol Z, Azo magenta G, Certicol Red B, Fast acid magenta, Hexalan Red B, Acetyl Red B, Naphthalene Red B, C.I. 17200

Identifiers
CAS Number	3567-66-6
3D model (JSmol)	Interactive image
ChemSpider	10660796
ECHA InfoCard	100.020.597
PubChem CID	9570136
UNII	9DBA0SBB0L
CompTox Dashboard (EPA)	DTXSID1044562
- InChI: InChI=1S/C16H13N3O7S2.2Na/c17-12-8-11(27(21,22)23)6-9-7-13(28(24,25)26)15(16(20)14(9)12)19-18-10-4-2-1-3-5-10;;/h1-8,20H,17H2,(H,21,22,23)(H,24,25,26);;/q;2*+1/p-2/b19-18+;; Key: LQJVOKWHGUAUHK-BUFQOAPZSA-L; InChI=1/C16H13N3O7S2.2Na/c17-12-8-11(27(21,22)23)6-9-7-13(28(24,25)26)15(16(20)14(9)12)19-18-10-4-2-1-3-5-10;;/h1-8,20H,17H2,(H,21,22,23)(H,24,25,26);;/q;2*+1/p-2/b19-18+;; Key: LQJVOKWHGUAUHK-GJLVVKPQBK
- SMILES: OC1=C(C(N)=CC(S([O-])(=O)=O)=C3)C3=CC(S([O-])(=O)=O)=C1\N=N\C2=CC=CC=C2.[Na+].[Na+]

Properties
Chemical formula	C_{16}H_{11}N_{3}Na_{2}O_{7}S_{2}
Molar mass	467.38 g·mol^{−1}
Appearance	Dark reddish brown powder
Melting point	decomposes below the melting point
- Except where otherwise noted, data are given for materials in their standard state (at 25 °C [77 °F], 100 kPa). Infobox references

D&C Red 33 also known as Acid Red 33 or simply Red 33 is a red azo dye used as a colorant in mouthwashes, dentifrices, cosmetics, and hair dyes. Red 33 is a disodium salt of 5-amino-4-hydroxy-3-(phenylazo)-2,7-naphthalenedisulfonic acid, which can be purified through high performance liquid chromatography.
