= Hydroxynaphthol blue =

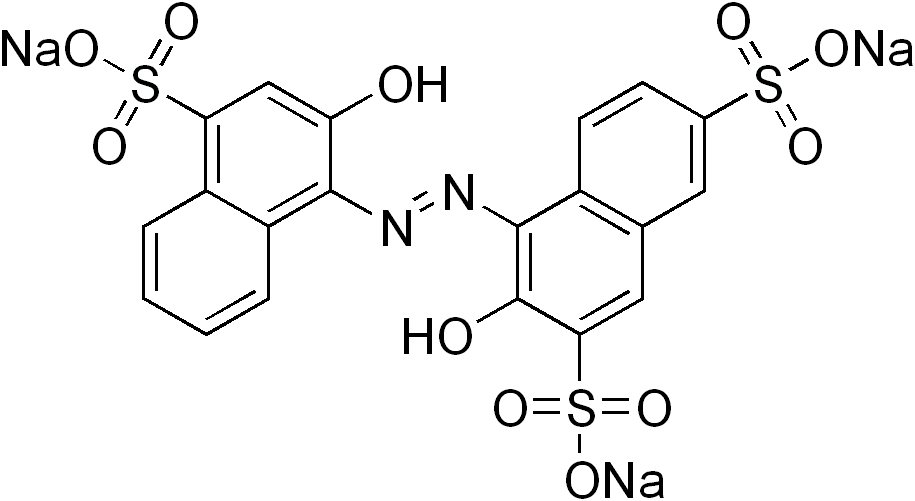

Names
- Other names Hydroxynaphthol blue

Identifiers
CAS Number	63451-35-4
3D model (JSmol)	Interactive image
ChemSpider	20157443
ECHA InfoCard	100.058.343
PubChem CID	9576626
UNII	VG5SKF7S6C
CompTox Dashboard (EPA)	DTXSID8069852
- InChI: InChI=1S/C20H14N2O11S3.3Na/c23-15-9-16(35(28,29)30)13-3-1-2-4-14(13)18(15)21-22-19-12-6-5-11(34(25,26)27)7-10(12)8-17(20(19)24)36(31,32)33;;;/h1-9,23-24H,(H,25,26,27)(H,28,29,30)(H,31,32,33);;;/q;3*+1/p-3/b22-21+;;; Key: AUIINJJXRXMPGT-ZRUFZDNISA-K; InChI=1/C20H14N2O11S3.3Na/c23-15-9-16(35(28,29)30)13-3-1-2-4-14(13)18(15)21-22-19-12-6-5-11(34(25,26)27)7-10(12)8-17(20(19)24)36(31,32)33;;;/h1-9,23-24H,(H,25,26,27)(H,28,29,30)(H,31,32,33);;;/q;3*+1/p-3/b22-21+;;; Key: AUIINJJXRXMPGT-QWKJSYRZBJ
- SMILES: O=S(C(C=C4)=CC1=C4C(/N=N/C2=C3C(C=CC=C3)=C(S(=O)(O[Na])=O)C=C2O)=C(O)C(S(=O)(O[Na])=O)=C1)(O[Na])=O

Properties
Chemical formula	C_{20}H_{11}N_{2}Na_{3}O_{11}S_{3}
Molar mass	620.46301 g/mol
Appearance	Black-violet Powder
Solubility in water	Soluble
Acidity (pK_{a})	6.44, 12.93
- Except where otherwise noted, data are given for materials in their standard state (at 25 °C [77 °F], 100 kPa). verify (what is ?) Infobox references

Hydroxynaphthol blue is an azo dye. It is used for determining the endpoint in complexometric titrations/Metal Titration.
