= Brilliant blue =

Brilliant blue is a shade of blue, or may refer to:

== Color ==
- RAL 5007 brilliant blue, an RAL color

== Chemicals ==
- Brilliant blue FCF, a dye
- Brilliant cresyl blue, a stain used in microscopy
- Coomassie brilliant blue, a dye
- Remazol Brilliant Blue R, a dye

== Entertainment ==
- "Brilliant Blue", a side B song on the single "Kyū Jō Show!!" by the Kanjani Eight
- Brilliant Blue (manga), a manga
- Daphne in the Brilliant Blue, a manga and television series

== Butterflies ==
- Junonia rhadama, a butterfly of islands in the Indian Ocean
- Lepidochrysops asteris, a butterfly of South Africa
