= Anthraquinone dyes =

Class of chemical compounds

Anthraquinone

Anthraquinone dyes are an abundant group of dyes comprising a anthraquinone unit as the shared structural element. Anthraquinone itself is colourless, but red to blue dyes are obtained by introducing electron donor groups such as hydroxy or amino groups in the 1-, 4-, 5- or 8-position. Anthraquinone dyestuffs are structurally related to indigo dyestuffs and are classified together with these in the group of carbonyl dyes.

Members of this dye group can be found in natural dyes as well as in synthetic dyes. Anthraquinone dyestuffs are represented in mordant and vat, but also in reactive and disperse dyes. They are characterized by very good light fastness.

== Natural anthraquinone dyes ==
Alizarin

One of the most important anthraquinone dyes of herbal origin is alizarin, which is extracted from the dyer's madder (Rubia tinctorum). Alizarin is the eponym for a number of structurally related dyes that use alizarin dyes (sometimes synonymous with anthraquinone dyes). It was the first natural dye for which an industrial synthesis was developed as early as 1869.

Anthraquinone dyes include red insect dyes derived from scale insects such as carminic acid, kermesic acid, and laccaic acids. The colorant carmine, with the main component carminic acid, is used, for example, as an approved food colorant E 120. The traditional methods for carmine production are labour-, land-, and insect-intensive. Because demand for red dyes is predicted to increase, researchers are exploring metabolic engineering approaches for the production of synthetic carminic acid.

== Synthetic anthraquinone dyes ==
The synthesis of most anthraquinone dyes is based on anthraquinone sulfonic acid (2) or nitroanthraquinone (3), which is obtained by sulfonation or nitration of anthraquinone (1).

Synthesis of 1-aminoanthraquinone

Sulfonation in α position is reversible and both the sulfonic acid groups and the nitro groups can be relatively easily replaced by amino, alkylamino, hydroxy and alkoxy groups. Aminoanthraquinone (4) is thus accessible by reaction of anthraquinone sulfonic acid with ammonia or by reduction of nitroanthraquinone.

An important intermediate product for many acid anthraquinone dyes is bromamic acid (1-amino-4-bromoanthraquinone-2-sulfonic acid) (6), which can be obtained from 1-aminoanthraquinone (4) by sulfonation with chlorosulfonic acid and subsequent bromination.

Synthesis of bromamic acid

By replacing the bromine substituent with an aliphatic or aromatic amine, vibrant blue dyes are obtained. For example, bromamic acid can be condensed with 3-(2-hydroxyethylsulfonyl)-aniline (7) to form the vibrant blue dye (8) (oxysulfone blue), from which the reactive dye C.I. Reactive Blue 19 is obtained after esterification with sulfuric acid.

Synthesis of C.I. Reactive Blue 19

Reactive Blue 19 is one of the oldest and still the most important reactive dyes, patented in 1949.

The first anthraquinone-based synthetic vat dye was indanthrone (C.I. Vat Blue 4) - the synthesis of which was developed by René Bohn in 1901:

Synthesis of indanthrone

By dimerization of 2-aminoanthraquinone (1) under strongly alkaline conditions at 220-235 °C, intermediate stage 3 is obtained in two steps, which is cyclized intramolecularly and oxidized to indanthrone 5.
