= Dye =

Soluble chemical substance or natural material which can impart color to other materials

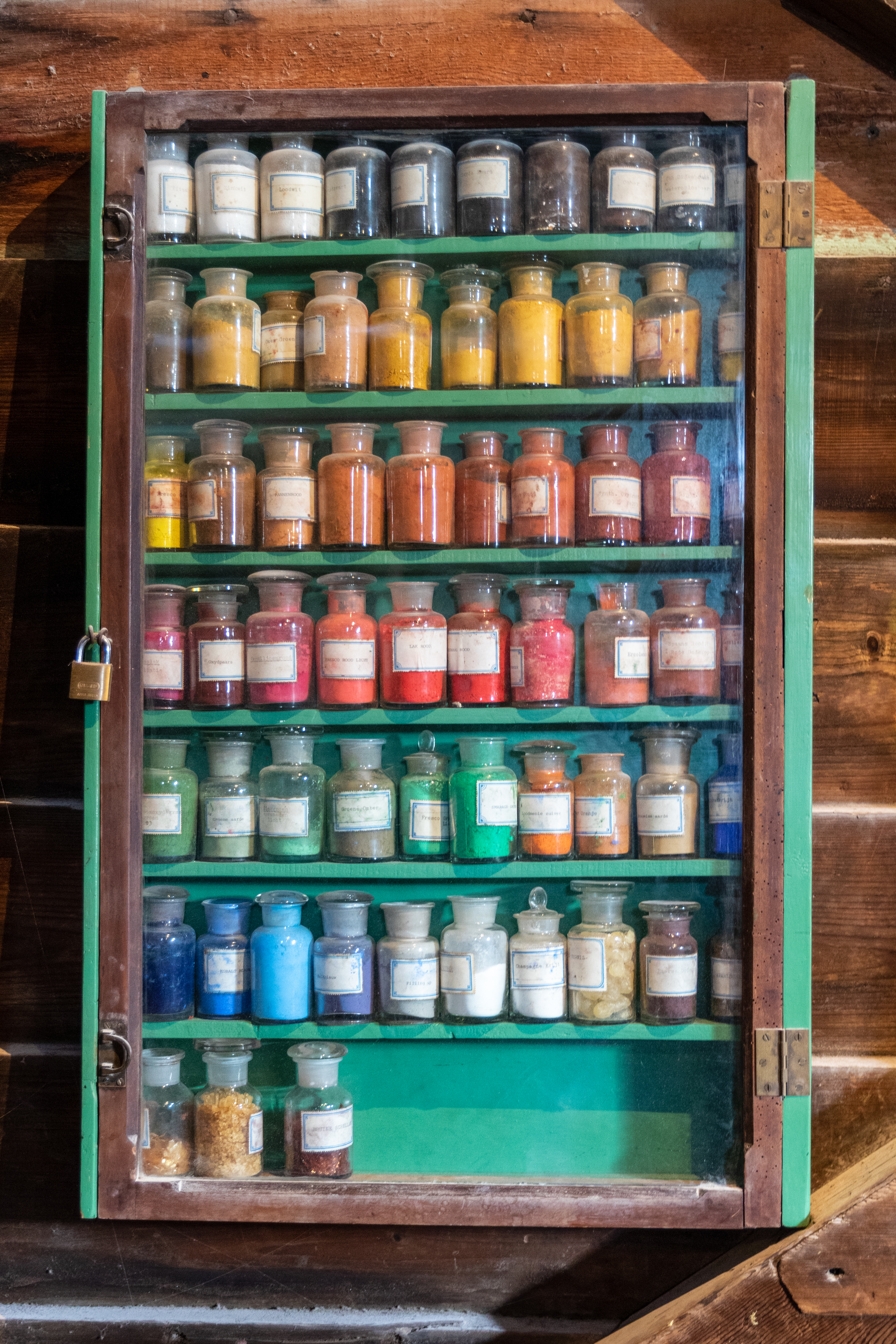
Dyes made at De Kat, Zaandam

A dye is a colored substance that is soluble in some solvent; by contrast pigments are insoluble or nearly so in all solvents. Because of their solubility, dyes can chemically bind to the material they color. Dye is generally applied in an aqueous solution and may require a mordant to improve the fastness of the dye on the fiber.

The majority of natural dyes are derived from non-animal sources such as roots, berries, bark, leaves, wood, fungi and lichens. However, due to large-scale demand and technological improvements, most dyes used in the modern world are synthetically produced from substances such as petrochemicals. Some are extracted from insects and/or minerals.

Synthetic dyes are produced from various chemicals. The great majority of dyes are obtained in this way because of their superior cost, optical properties (color), and resilience (fastness, mordancy). Both dyes and pigments are colored, because they absorb only some wavelengths of visible light. Dyes are usually soluble in some solvent, whereas pigments are insoluble. Some dyes can be rendered insoluble with the addition of salt to produce a lake pigment.

== History ==
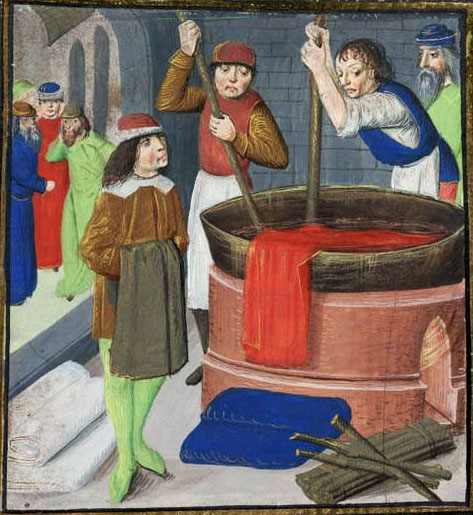
Dyeing wool cloth, 1482: from a French translation of Bartolomaeus Anglicus

Textile dyeing dates back to the Neolithic period. Throughout history, people have dyed their textiles using common, locally available materials. Scarce dyestuffs that produced brilliant and permanent colors such as the natural invertebrate dyes Tyrian purple and crimson kermes were highly prized luxury items in the ancient and medieval world. Plant-based dyes such as woad, indigo, saffron, and madder were important trade goods in the economies of Asia and Europe. Across Asia and Africa, patterned fabrics were produced using resist dyeing techniques to control the absorption of color in piece-dyed cloth. Dyes from the New World such as cochineal and logwood were brought to Europe by the Spanish treasure fleets, and the dyestuffs of Europe were carried by colonists to America.

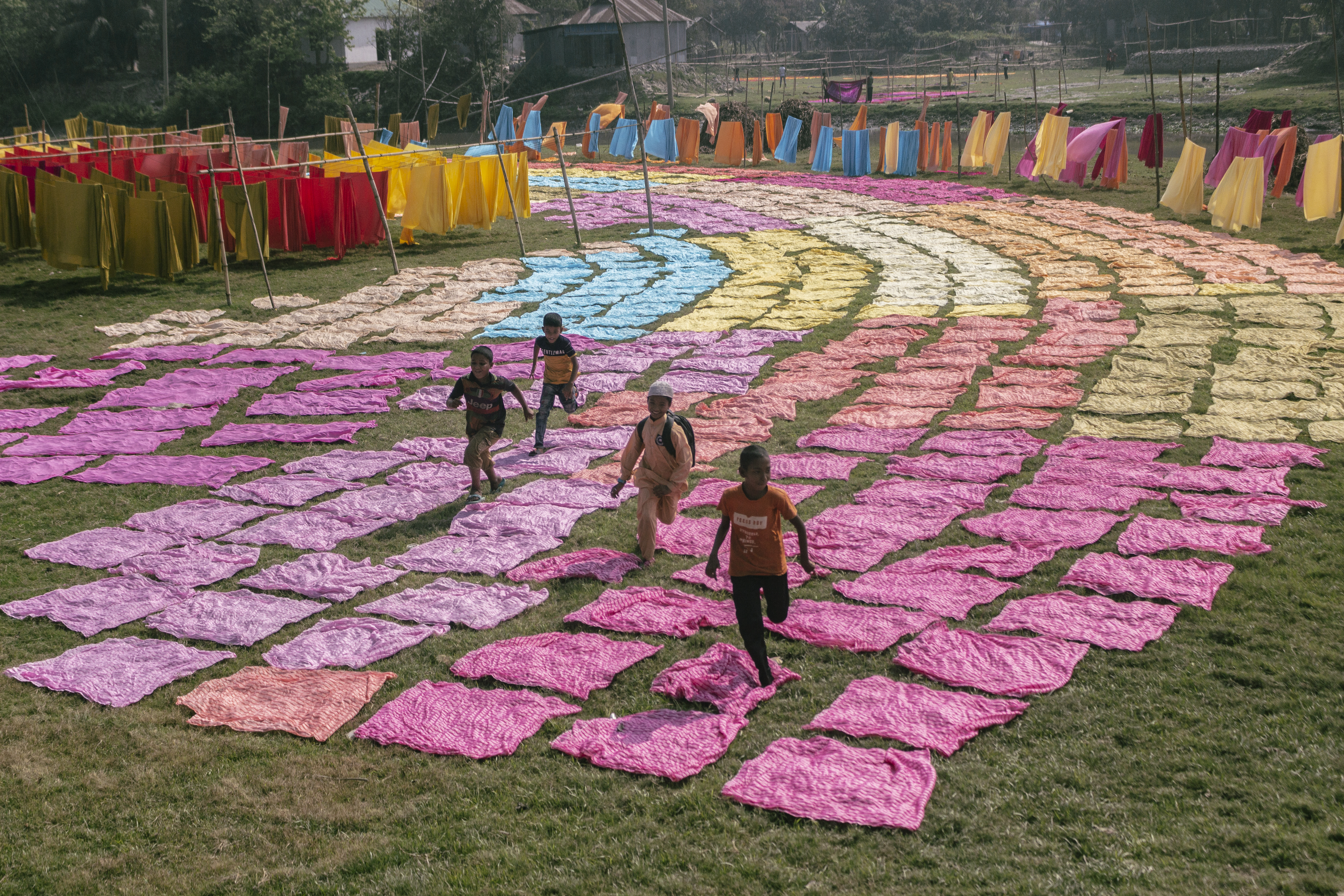
Drying colored cloth

Dyed flax fibers have been found in the Republic of Georgia in a prehistoric cave dated to 36,000 BP. Archaeological evidence shows that, particularly in India and Phoenicia, dyeing has been widely carried out for over 5,000 years. Early dyes were obtained from animal, vegetable or mineral sources, with no to very little processing. By far the greatest source of dyes has been from the plant kingdom, notably roots, berries, bark, leaves and wood, only few of which are used on a commercial scale.

Early industrialization was conducted by J. Pullar and Sons in Scotland. The first synthetic dye, mauve, was discovered serendipitously by William Henry Perkin in 1856. The discovery of mauveine started a surge in synthetic dyes and in organic chemistry in general. Other aniline dyes followed, such as fuchsine, safranine, and induline. Many thousands of synthetic dyes have since been prepared.

The discovery of mauveine in 1856 led to the development of a synthetic dyestuff industry. In Manchester, England, a number of people set up dyestuff manufacturing plant including Ivan Levinstein, Levinstein Ltd, Charles Dreyfus, Clayton Aniline Company, William Claus, Claus & co.

The discovery of mauve also led to developments within immunology and chemotherapy. In 1863 the forerunner to Bayer AG was formed in what became Wuppertal, Germany. In 1891, Paul Ehrlich discovered that certain cells or organisms took up certain dyes selectively. He then reasoned that a sufficiently large dose could be injected to kill pathogenic microorganisms, if the dye did not affect other cells. Ehrlich went on to use a compound to target syphilis, the first time a chemical was used in order to selectively kill bacteria in the body. He also used methylene blue to target the plasmodium responsible for malaria.

== Classification of dyes ==
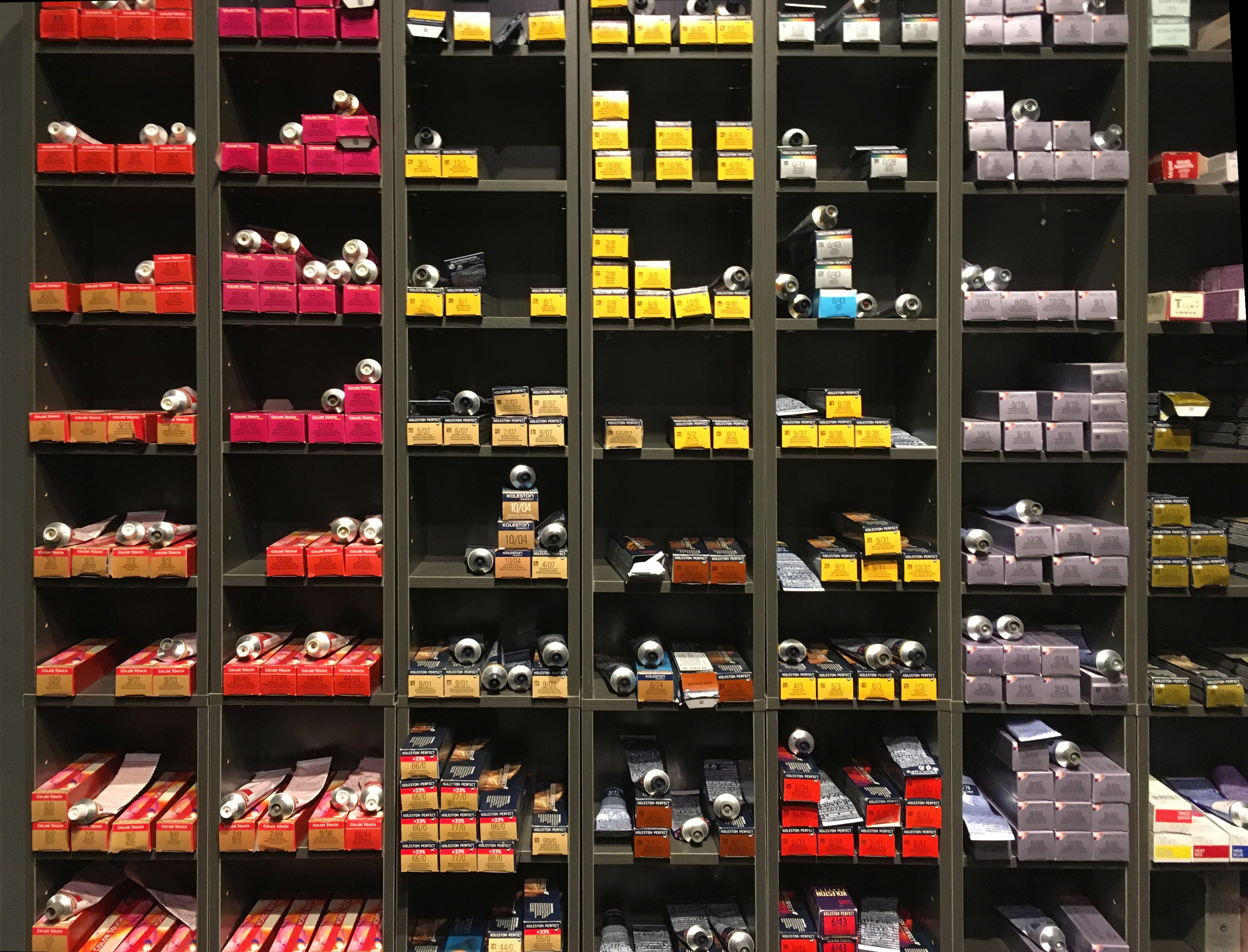
Shelf with various hair dyes in a hairdresser shop

The color of a dye derives from the absorption of light within the visible region of the electromagnetic spectrum (380–750 nm). The chemical structure determines the light absorption and is therefore the basis for many classification schemes.

=== Classification according to chemical structure ===
==== Anthraquinone dyes ====
The basic structure of this group of dyes is anthraquinone. By varying the substituents, almost all colors from yellow to red and from blue to green can be obtained, with red and blue anthraquinone dyes being particularly important. Through reduction, the quinone can be converted into the corresponding water-soluble hydroquinone, allowing anthraquinone dyes to be used as vat dyes. With appropriate substituents, anthraquinone dyes can also be used as disperse dyes for dyeing synthetic fibers. Water-soluble anthraquinone dyes containing sulfonic acid groups are used as acid or reactive dyes.

Indanthrone

Disperse Blue 87

Acid Blue 25

Reactive Blue 19

==== Azo dyes ====
Azo group, R^{1,2}=aryl / alkenyl

Azo dyes contain an azo group substituted with an aryl group or alkenyl group as their basic structural element. Azo dyes containing multiple azo groups are referred to as bisazo (also disazo), trisazo, tetrakisazo, and polyazo dyes. Aryl substituents are usually benzene or naphthalene derivatives, but may also include heteroaromatic systems such as pyrazoles or pyridones. Enolizable aliphatic groups, for example substituted anilides of acetoacetic acid, are used as alkenyl substituents.

The dyes are synthesized by diazotization of aromatic amines followed by azo coupling of the diazonium salts with electron-rich aromatics or β-dicarbonyl compounds. Azo dyes are by far the most important and extensive class of dyes and are represented in almost all application-related dye categories (→Classification according to application technology). No naturally occurring azo dyes are known. With the exception of turquoise and a brilliant green, almost all colors can be achieved using azo dyes. The azo group is sensitive to reducing agents; it is cleaved, resulting in discoloration of the dye. Some examples of different types of azo dyes (mono- and bisazo dyes / benzene, naphthalene residues / pyridone, acetoacetanilide coupling components / metal complex dyes):

C.I. Reactive Black 5

Disperse Yellow 241

Mordant Black 9

Solvent Yellow 19

==== Dioxazine dyes ====
Triphendioxazine

Dioxazine dyes, also known as triphendioxazine dyes, contain triphendioxazine as their basic structure. These intensely colored, brilliant dyes exhibit good color fastness and thus combine advantages of both azo and anthraquinone dyes. Dioxazine dyes are commercially available as direct and reactive dyes.

Direct Blue 106

Reactive Blue 204

==== Indigoid dyes ====
Chemical structure of indigo dye, the blue coloration of blue jeans. Although once extracted from plants, indigo dye is now almost exclusively synthesized industrially.

Indigoid dyes belong to the carbonyl dyes and are used as vat dyes. The most important representative is indigo, which was extracted from plants as a natural dye in ancient times and is still produced industrially in large quantities, particularly for dyeing jeans. Another natural dye is the ancient purple (C.I. Natural Violet 1 / Dibromindigo).

C.I. Vat Blue 1 (Indigo)

C.I. Natural Violet 1

Indirubin

==== Metal complex dyes ====
Metal complex dyes consist of complex compounds formed from a metal and one or more dye ligands containing electron donors. Copper and chromium compounds predominate, although cobalt, nickel, and iron complexes are also used to a lesser extent. The ligands are often azo dyes, methine dyes, formazans, or phthalocyanines. Metal complex dyes are characterized by excellent fastness properties.

===== Formazan dyes =====
Triphenylformazan

Formazan dyes are structurally related to azo dyes. Their basic structure is triphenylformazan. They form chelate complexes with transition metals such as copper, nickel, or cobalt. Depending on the substituents, non-complexed formazans are orange to deep red, whereas metal-complex formazans are violet, blue, or green. They are synthesized by azo coupling of diazonium salts with hydrazones. Of particular commercial importance are blue tetradentate copper chelate complexes of various formazans, which are used mainly as reactive dyes for cotton:

C.I. Reactive Blue 160

C.I. Reactive Blue 235

===== Phthalocyanine dyes =====
Phthalocyanine dyes are copper or nickel metal complexes based on the phthalocyanine structure. They are structurally related to porphyrins and share the annulene element. By introducing water-soluble substituents—primarily via sulfochlorination—turquoise to brilliant green dyes can be obtained. Phthalocyanine dyes are distinguished by outstanding light fastness.

Phthalocyanine (Aza[18]annulene)

C.I. Reactive Blue 7

==== Methine dyes ====
Structural principle of methine dyes

Methine or polymethine dyes possess conjugated double bonds as their chromophoric system, with two terminal groups acting as an electron acceptor A and an electron donor D. These terminal groups, which usually contain nitrogen or oxygen atoms, may be part of a heterocycle, and the double bonds may be part of an aromatic system. If one or more methine groups are replaced by nitrogen atoms, the dyes are referred to as aza-analog methine dyes. This gives rise to different subclasses:

Cyanine dyes, in which the conjugated double bonds are flanked by a tertiary amino group and a quaternary ammonium compounds. If two methine groups are replaced by nitrogen atoms and one terminal group is part of a heterocycle while the other is open-chain, the important diazahemicyanine dyes are formed. Example: Basic Red 22.

Styryl dyes: by insertion of a phenyl ring into the polyene backbone, these dyes contain a styrene structural element. Example: Disperse Yellow 31.

Triarylmethine dyes, also referred to in older literature as triphenylmethane dyes because they are derived from triphenylmethane, in which at least two of the aromatic rings carry electron-donating substituents. Example: Basic Green 4 (malachite green).

C.I. Basic Red 22

C.I. Disperse Yellow 31

C.I. Basic Green 4 (malachite green)

==== Nitro and nitroso dyes ====
In nitro dyes, a nitro group is located on an aromatic ring in the ortho position relative to an electron donor, either a hydroxy (–OH) or an amino group (–NH_{2}). The oldest representative of this dye class is picric acid (2,4,6-trinitrophenol). Hydroxynitro dyes are no longer of commercial importance. This is a relatively small but historically significant dye class, whose representatives are characterized by high light fastness and simple production. Nitro dyes exhibit yellow to brown hues. Owing to their relatively small molecular size, an important application as disperse dyes is the dyeing of polyester fibers. They are also used as acid and pigment dyes.

The rare nitroso dyes are aromatic compounds containing a nitroso group. Nitroso dyes with a hydroxy group in the ortho position to the nitroso group are used exclusively as metal complexes. A typical representative is naphthol green B (C.I. Acid Green 1).

Picric acid

Acid Orange 3

Disperse Yellow 42

C.I. Acid Green 1

==== Sulfur dyes ====
Sulfur dyes (sulfin dyes) are water-insoluble, macromolecular dyes that contain disulfide bridges or oligosulfide bonds between aromatic residues. They are produced by melting benzene, naphthalene, or anthracene derivatives with sulfur or polysulfides and have an ill-defined constitution. They are particularly suitable for dyeing cotton fiber. Similar to vat dyes, they are reduced to a water-soluble form (leuco compound) using caustic soda and dithionites or sodium sulfide, applied to the fiber, and then fixed in an insoluble form by oxidation. For toxicological and ecological reasons, oxidation with chromates is increasingly being replaced by low-sulfide sulfur dyes and sulfide-free reducing agents. Owing to their low production costs, sulfur dyes continue to play an important role in terms of volume. They are characterized by good wash and light fastness, although the colors are generally muted.

=== Classification according to application technology ===
While the color shade of a dye is essentially determined by its chromophore, dye properties can be modified by incorporating suitable chemical groups to enable dyeing of different substrates. This leads to a classification of dyes according to the dyeing process. This classification is also used by the Colour Index, an important standard reference in dye chemistry. The Colour Index (C.I.) indicates the dye class, color, and chemical identity. It lists more than 10,000 dyes, over 50% of which are azo dyes.

==== Mordant dyes ====
The term derives from mordant dyeing, in which suitable acid dyes are applied to mordanted fabrics, primarily wool and silk. Prior to dyeing, the fibers are treated with [chromium] , [iron] , or aluminum salts. During subsequent steaming, metal hydroxides form on the fiber. During dyeing, these hydroxides react with the (usually specialized) acid dye to form a metal complex dye. The process on the fiber corresponds to varnishing.

When chromium salts are used, the dyes are referred to as chromium dyes. Depending on the dye type, the chromium salt—usually chromates or dichromates—may be added before, during, or after dyeing. Accordingly, pre-mordanting, post-mordanting, and single-bath chromium dyeing processes are distinguished. Chromium dyes are noted for their excellent wet fastness. However, heavy metal contamination of fibers and dyeing wastewater is a significant ecological concern.

Mordant dyes are designated as "C.I. Mordant Dyes" in the Colour Index. Examples:

C.I. Mordant Black 9

C.I. Mordant Yellow 8

C.I. Mordant Black 7

C.I. Mordant Red 60

C.I. Mordant Blue 9

Historically, in addition to chromium, iron, and aluminum salts, mordants based on ammonium vanadate, tannic acid, aluminum oxide, antimony, barium, lead, cobalt, copper, manganese, nickel, tin, and Turkish red oil were also used. Various antimony salts such as potassium antimony tartrate or antimony(III) chloride, as well as sodium silicate and sodium phosphate, and even cow dung, were employed as fixing agents.

==== Direct dyes ====
Direct dyes (or substantive dyes) are absorbed directly from aqueous solution onto the fiber due to their high substantivity. They are particularly suitable for cellulose fibers. Binding to the fiber occurs through physical interactions, mainly Van der Waals forces. Most direct dyes belong to the azo dye group, especially polyazo dyes. In the Colour Index, they are designated as C.I. Direct Dyes. Examples:

C.I. Direct Blue 8

C.I. Direct Orange 26

C.I. Direct Yellow 9

==== Disperse dyes ====
Disperse dyes, which are almost insoluble in water, are primarily used for dyeing hydrophobic polyester and cellulose acetate. They are finely ground together with dispersing agents, enabling the molecularly dissolved dye to diffuse into the fiber during dyeing, where it forms a solid solution. This results in dyes with good wash and light fastness.

The vast majority of disperse dyes belong to the azo dye class. Disperse dyes represent a highly important group, particularly due to the widespread use and mechanical performance of polyester fibers. In 1999, the total sales volume in Western Europe amounted to 98 million euros.

According to the Colour Index, they are designated as "C.I. Disperse Dyes". Examples:

C.I. Disperse Orange 44

C.I. Disperse Blue 797

C.I. Disperse Red 177

==== Development or coupling dyes ====
In developing dyes, a practically water-insoluble dye is formed directly on the fiber by the reaction of a water-soluble coupling component (C.I. Azoic Coupling Component) with a water-soluble diazo component (C.I. Azoic Diazo Component). This dye class is mainly used for cellulose fibers and is characterized by very good wet fastness. The most important coupling component in developing dyes is Naphthol AS.

C.I. Azoic Coupling Component 2 (naphthol AS)

C.I. Azoic Coupling Component 35 (naphthol AS-LG)

C.I. Azoic Diazo Component 3 (Echt scarlet salt GG)

C.I. Azoic Diazo Component 35 (Variamin blue salt B)

==== Cationic dyes ====
Cationic dyes are cationic compounds that produce brilliant and lightfast colors, particularly on polyacrylonitrile (PAN) fibers and anionically modified polyester fibers. They form ionic bonds with negatively charged groups on the fiber. Various chromophores can be used in cationic dyes; in methine dyes, the positive charge is delocalized, in contrast to other chromophoric systems.

Although cationic dyes are designated as "C.I. Basic Dyes" in the Colour Index, the term "basic dyes" is no longer commonly used for this dye class in recent literature.

C.I. Basic Orange 22

C.I. Basic Blue 3

C.I. Basic Blue 54

C.I. Basic Red 18

==== Vat dyes ====
Vat dyes comprise water-insoluble pigments that are converted into their soluble dihydro or leuco base form for dyeing by reduction (vatting) in an alkaline solution. The anion exhibits sufficient affinity for cotton or viscose fibers, allowing absorption. The dye is subsequently reconverted to its insoluble form by oxidation, either by atmospheric oxygen or by oxidizing agents. The dye is effectively fixed at the molecular level within the fiber; this "precipitation within the fiber" results in very high wash and light fastness. Water-insoluble sulfur dyes exhibit similar behavior.

The most important vat dye is indigo. Indanthrene dyes are also of major importance.

Vat dyes are designated as "C.I. Vat Dyes" in the Colour Index. Examples:

C.I. Vat Green 11

C.I. Vat Orange 7

C.I. Vat Red 23

Flavanthron Yellow

==== Food colorants / food dyes ====
Food colorants are used as food additives to compensate for color changes caused by processing or to meet consumer expectations. Both naturally occurring and synthetically produced colorants are employed. The use of food colorants is strictly regulated by law—within the EU by Regulation (EC) No. 1333/2008 of December 16, 2008, on food additives. Only approved additives bearing an E number may be marketed, and these must be declared on the product.

Food colorants are designated as "C.I. Food Dyes" in the Colour Index.

Because food dyes are classed as food additives, they are manufactured to a higher standard than some industrial dyes. Food dyes can be direct, mordant and vat dyes, and their use is strictly controlled by legislation. Many are azo dyes, although anthraquinone and triphenylmethane compounds are used for colors such as green and blue. Some naturally occurring dyes are also used.

==== Solvent dyes ====
Solvent dyes, designated as "Solvent Dyes" in the Colour Index, are water-insoluble dyes that are soluble in various organic solvents such as alcohols, esters, or hydrocarbons. As a rule, solvent dye structures do not contain sulfonic acid or carboxyl groups. Exceptions include cationic dyes with an intramolecular sulfonate or carboxylate group acting as the counterion. Solvent dyes occur across various dye classes, including azo dyes, anthraquinone dyes, metal complex dyes, and phthalocyanines. They are used in lacquers (e.g., Zapon dyes for Zapon lacquers), for coloring mineral oil products (Sudan dyes), wax, inks, and transparent plastics. According to the Colour Index, they are designated as C.I. Solvent Dyes.

Examples:

Solvent Yellow 124

Solvent Red 27

Solvent Blue 35

C.I. Solvent Yellow 32

Sudan Black B

C.I. Solvent Red 8

==== Reactive dyes ====
During the dyeing process, reactive dyes form a covalent bond with functional groups of the fiber, resulting in dyes with high wet fastness. They constitute the largest group of dyes used for cellulose fibers, but are also employed for wool and polyamide in deep shades.

Chemically, reactive dyes consist of two components: a chromophore and one or more reactive groups, also referred to as reactive anchors. Two major reactive anchor systems are used:

- Heterocyclic compounds, such as halogen-substituted triazines or pyrimidines. During dyeing, these react with hydroxyl groups of the fiber, eliminating halogen hydrides and forming stable covalent ether bonds:

- So-called vinylsulfones, which react with nucleophilic groups of the fiber during dyeing via a Michael addition. Here as well, stable ether bonds are formed. In many vinyl sulfone dyes, the vinyl sulfone group is initially present in a protected form as a sulfuric acid semiester. Only under alkaline dyeing conditions is the vinyl sulfone group generated by elimination of sulfuric acid.

Both types of reactive anchors may be present simultaneously in a single reactive dye.

Azo dyes are by far the most common chromophores used in reactive dyes. However, other chromophoric systems, such as anthraquinone, formazan, and phthalocyanine dyes, are also important. Reactive dyes are designated as "C.I. Reactive Dyes" in the Colour Index.

Examples:

C.I. Reactive Orange 107

C.I. Reactive Blue 2

C.I. Reactive Blue 21

C.I. Reactive Red 227

C.I. Reactive Orange 1

==== Acid dyes ====
Acid dyes are hydrophilic dyes containing anionic substituents, usually sulfonic acid groups. Most acid dyes belong to the azo dye class, although other chromophores also occur. They are mainly used for dyeing wool, silk, and polyamide, with dyeing carried out in the pH range 2–6. When small dye molecules are used, uniform dyeing is achieved, with dye molecules forming primarily salt-like bonds with ammonium groups of the fiber. The wash fastness of such dyes is relatively moderate. With increasing molecular size, dye–fiber binding is enhanced through adsorption forces between the hydrophobic parts of the dye molecule and the fiber. This improves wet fastness, but often at the expense of dyeing uniformity.

Acid dyes are designated as "C.I. Acid Dyes" in the Colour Index. Examples:

C.I. Acid Black 1

C.I. Acid Yellow 36

C.I. Acid Blue 117

Acid Orange 19

C.I. Acid Blue 3 (Patent Blue V)

==== Functional dyes ====
While conventional dyes are used to modify the appearance of textiles, leather, and paper, functional dyes generally serve non-aesthetic purposes. Typical applications include indicator dyes or voltage-dependent dyes.

Special dyes can

- absorb light at a specific wavelength and convert it into heat (e.g., in chemical and biochemical analysis),
- re-emit absorbed light at a different wavelength (as phosphorescent biomarkers or inks, fluorescence in dye lasers, chemiluminescence in the breaking or formation of chemical bonds in biochemistry),
- change the polarization direction of light (e.g., in frequency doubling or as optical switches),
- induce electrical phenomena (e.g., in laser printer applications),
- enable photochemical processes.

Laser dyes are used in the production of some lasers, optical media (CD-R), and camera sensors (color filter array). From an economic perspective, functional dyes are particularly important in the manufacture of CDs and DVDs. The dye molecules are embedded in the polycarbonate of the disc. The laser beam of the burner causes the dye molecules to absorb light energy and convert it into heat, leading to localized melting of the polycarbonate. This slightly altered surface structure is then detected during the reading process. Laser dyes are for example rhodamine 6G and coumarin dyes.

==== Vital dyes ====
A "vital dye" or stain is a dye capable of penetrating living cells or tissues without causing immediate visible degenerative changes. Such dyes are useful in medical and pathological fields in order to selectively color certain structures (such as cells) in order to distinguish them from surrounding tissue and thus make them more visible for study (for instance, under a microscope). As the visibility is meant to allow study of the cells or tissues, it is usually important that the dye not have other effects on the structure or function of the tissue that might impair objective observation.

A distinction is drawn between dyes that are meant to be used on cells that have been removed from the organism prior to study (supravital staining) and dyes that are used within a living body - administered by injection or other means (intravital staining) - as the latter is (for instance) subject to higher safety standards, and must typically be a chemical known to avoid causing adverse effects on any biochemistry (until cleared from the tissue), not just to the tissue being studied, or in the short term.

The term "vital stain" is occasionally used interchangeably with both intravital and supravital stains, the underlying concept in either case being that the cells examined are still alive. In a stricter sense, the term "vital staining" means the polar opposite of "supravital staining." If living cells absorb the stain during supravital staining, they exclude it during "vital staining"; for example, they color negatively while only dead cells color positively, and thus viability can be determined by counting the percentage of total cells that stain negatively. Because the dye determines whether the staining is supravital or intravital, a combination of supravital and vital dyes can be used to more accurately classify cells into various groups (e.g., viable, dead, dying).

==== Other important dyes ====
A number of other classes have also been established, including:

- Leather dyes, for leather.
- Fluorescent brighteners, for textile fibres and paper.
- Solvent dyes, for wood staining and producing colored lacquers, solvent inks, coloring oils, waxes.
- Contrast dyes, injected for magnetic resonance imaging, are essentially the same as clothing dye except they are coupled to an agent that has strong paramagnetic properties.
- Mayhems dye, used in water cooling for looks, often rebranded RIT dye.

== Pollution ==
Dyes produced by the textile, printing and paper industries are a source of pollution of rivers and waterways. An estimated 700,000 tons of dyestuffs are produced annually (1990 data). The disposal of that material has received much attention, using chemical and biological means.

== Dye degradation and treatment ==
Before being released into the environment, the dyes can be broken down into less harmful substances or separated from the water which is then released. There are several ways to do this:

=== Adsorption ===
Adsorption is one of the most common and effective methods for dye removal due to its simplicity, low cost, and wide availability of adsorbents. In this process, dye molecules adhere to the surface of solid materials like activated carbon, clay, zeolites, or agricultural waste. The method does not require harsh chemicals or high energy and can achieve high dye removal efficiency. However, its performance depends on the type of dye and the surface properties of the adsorbent and spent adsorbents may also require proper disposal or regeneration.

=== Membrane filtration ===
Membrane filtration involve separation of dye molecules from water using semi-permeable membranes. Techniques such as ultrafiltration, nanofiltration, and reverse osmosis can remove dyes based on their size and molecular weight. These methods offer high separation efficiency and can produce reusable water. However, they can be expensive, require high pressure, and are prone to membrane fouling, which reduces their lifespan and performance.

=== Coagulation and flocculation ===
This method uses chemical coagulants (alum, ferric chloride) to destabilize and aggregate dye particles into larger flocs. These flocs can then be removed through sedimentation or filtration. Coagulation is commonly used as a pre-treatment step in wastewater treatment plants. While effective for removing particulate-bound dyes, it is less efficient for soluble or highly stable dye compounds and generates a large volume of chemical sludge.

=== Biological treatment ===
Biological methods rely on the activity of microorganisms (bacteria, fungi, or algae) to degrade dye molecules. These processes are cost-effective and environmentally friendly, making them attractive for large-scale treatment. However, many synthetic dyes, especially azo dyes, are resistant to microbial breakdown due to their complex structures. Biological methods often require long retention times and are sensitive to operational conditions such as pH, temperature, and the presence of toxic substances.

=== Chemical oxidation ===
Chemical oxidation uses strong oxidants such as ozone (O_{3}), hydrogen peroxide (H_{2}O_{2}), or chlorine to break down dye molecules into less harmful substances. Advanced oxidation processes (AOPs) generate highly reactive radicals that can fully mineralize organic pollutants. These methods are fast and effective for a wide range of dyes but can be costly and may produce secondary pollutants or require complex equipment.

=== Photocatalytic degradation ===
Photocatalytic degradation is a sustainable and advanced method that uses light energy (usually UV or sunlight) in the presence of a semiconductor catalyst like titanium dioxide (TiO_{2}) or zinc oxide (ZnO) to degrade dyes. The process generates reactive oxygen species (ROS) such as hydroxyl radicals that break down dye molecules into smaller and less harmful by-products such as water and carbon dioxide. This method is clean, reusable, and effective for treating resistant dyes, making it ideal for modern wastewater treatment strategies. Heterogeneous photocatalysis is one approach to the degradation of dyes.

=== Ion exchange ===
In ion exchange, dye ions in water are exchanged with non-toxic ions using synthetic resin materials. This method is selective, efficient, and works well for low-concentration dye solutions. It can also be regenerated and reused multiple times. However, its capacity is limited, and it is less effective for removing large, non-ionic, or complex dye molecules.

=== Electrochemical treatment ===
Electrochemical treatment uses electric current to drive oxidation or reduction reactions that break down dye molecules. It can be performed without additional chemicals and is capable of complete dye removal. The process is effective for a wide range of dyes and can be automated. However, it requires high energy input, and the equipment can be costly for large-scale operations.

== See also ==
- Biological pigment, any colored substance in organisms
- Blue Wool Scale
- Hair coloring
- Industrial dye degradation
- J-aggregate
- Laser dyes
- List of dyes
- Oxidant
- Phototendering
- Stain
- Natural dyes
- Pigments
  - Inorganic pigments
  - Organic pigments
