= Disperse Yellow 26 =

Names
- Preferred IUPAC name 4-Chloro-2-nitro-N-phenylaniline
- Other names 4-Chloro-2-nitrodiphenylamine; N-(4-Chloro-2-nitrophenyl)aniline; C.I. 10348 (Colour index numbers)

Identifiers
CAS Number	16611-15-7
3D model (JSmol)	Interactive image
ChemSpider	77121
PubChem CID	85511
UNII	H52PM8WW87
CompTox Dashboard (EPA)	DTXSID40168077
- InChI: InChI=1S/C12H9ClN2O2/c13-9-6-7-11(12(8-9)15(16)17)14-10-4-2-1-3-5-10/h1-8,14H Key: GYOVQZDXSHTPBS-UHFFFAOYSA-N
- SMILES: c1ccc(cc1)Nc2ccc(cc2[N+](=O)[O-])Cl

Properties
Chemical formula	C_{12}H_{9}ClN_{2}O_{2}
Molar mass	248.67 g·mol^{−1}
- Except where otherwise noted, data are given for materials in their standard state (at 25 °C [77 °F], 100 kPa). Infobox references

Disperse Yellow 26, or 4-chloro-2-nitrodiphenylamine, is a disperse dye. The dye is used in polyamide and vinegar fiber dyeing. Disperse Yellow 26 is produced by the condensation of aniline and 1,4-dichloro-2-nitrobenzene.

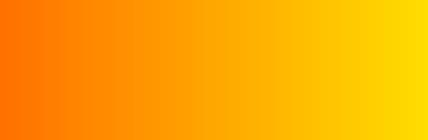
The hue of Disperse Yellow 26 is red light to yellow.
