= Roland Scholl =

Swiss chemist (1865–1945)

Prof. Dr. phil. Roland Heinrich Scholl
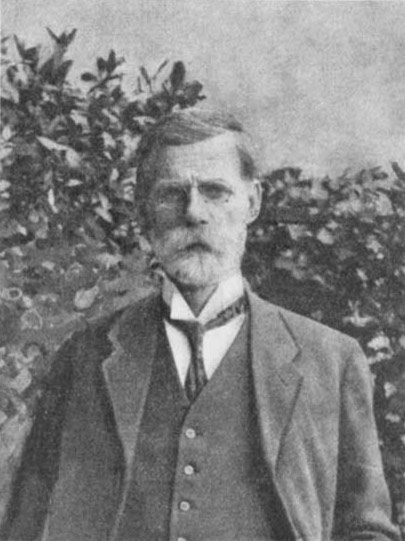
- Born: 30 September 1865; Zurich, Canton of Zurich, Switzerland
- Died: 22 August 1945 (aged 79); Mörtitz, Saxony, Allied-occupied Germany
- Cause of death: Injuries sustained in the Allied bombing of Dresden
- Education: University of Würzburg, Eidgenössisches Polytechnikum
- Occupation: Chemist
- Employers: Eidgenössisches Polytechnikum, University of Zurich, Technische Hochschule Karlsruhe, University of Graz, Technische Universität Dresden
- Organizations: Austrian Academy of Sciences (1916), Saxon Academy of Sciences (1920), German Chemical Society (1930)
- Known for: Coronene, Bally-Scholl synthesis
- Relatives: Johannes Wislicenus (uncle)
- Awards: Goethe-Medaille für Kunst und Wissenschaft (1944)

Roland Heinrich Scholl (30 September 1865 – 22 August 1945) was a Swiss chemist who taught at various European universities. Among his most notable achievements are the synthesis of coronene, the co-development of the Bally-Scholl synthesis, and various discoveries about polycyclic aromatic hydrocarbons.

== Early life and education ==
Roland Heinrich Scholl was born on 30 September 1865 in Zurich, Switzerland, the son of a Badensian merchant. After primary education by a private teacher and secondary education at a Gymnasium in Zurich, he studied chemistry and physics at the University of Würzburg in 1883. One of his teachers there was Johannes Wislicenus, his mother's brother. After military service in a Bavarian regiment, he continued his studies in 1885 at the Eidgenössisches Polytechnikum in Zurich. In 1890 he received a Dr. phil. degree from the University of Basel.

== Life and career ==
In 1893, Roland Scholl became Privatdozent in chemistry at the Polytechnikum as well as at the University of Zurich. In 1897, he became the assistant director of the chemical laboratory of the Technische Hochschule Karlsruhe (today the Karlsruhe Institute of Technology). After being promoted to associate professor in 1904, he moved to the University of Graz, where he became full professor in 1907. In 1914, Scholl volunteered for service in World War I, and after the end of his service he moved to the Technische Universität Dresden, where he worked as the director of the institute for organic chemistry until his retirement in 1934.

Suffering from injuries sustained in the Allied bombing of Dresden, Roland Scholl died on 22 August 1945 in a refugee camp on the site of a former military airfield near Mörtitz, a small village in Saxony.

== Research ==
Scholl made a name for himself in the scientific community at a young age through publications on the chemistry of fulminic acid, disproving the structures of this molecule proposed by August Kekulé and Edward Divers. He did some research for the Badische Anilin- und Sodafabrik (BASF) in the early 1900s, and began doing research on polycyclic aromatic hydrocarbons, especially vat dyes such as indanthrene and flavanthrene, in 1903. Among other things, Scholl developed a method for the synthesis of pyranthrone, the first nitrogen- and sulfur-free vat dye.

Scholl was one of the first persons to use the microbalance developed by Fritz Pregl, the father of microanalysis, who was a close collaborator of Scholl. In 1911, Roland Scholl and Oscar Bally published an article on the synthesis of benzanthrone by condensation of anthraquinone with glycerol, a process that would later be called the Bally-Scholl synthesis. In 1932, Scholl was the first person to synthesise coronene.

Over the course of his career, Scholl published about 180 scientific articles. He became a member of the Austrian Academy of Sciences in 1916, of the Saxon Academy of Sciences in 1920, and of the German Chemical Society as well as the Chemische Gesellschaft Karlsruhe in 1930. In 1944 he was awarded the Goethe-Medaille für Kunst und Wissenschaft.

== Notable publications ==
- Scholl, Roland (July–October 1903). "Untersuchungen über Indanthren und Flavanthren I". Berichte der deutschen chemischen Gesellschaft (in German). 36 (3): 3410–3426. doi:10.1002/cber.190303603129. ISSN 0365-9496. Scholl's first article on the vat dyes Indanthrene and Flavanthrene
- Scholl, Roland (January–March 1910). "Pyranthron, ein stickstofffreies Methinanalogon des Flavanthrens, und Dimethylpyranthron". Berichte der deutschen chemischen Gesellschaft (in German). 43 (1): 346–356. doi:10.1002/cber.19100430155. ISSN 0365-9496. On the first synthesis of pyranthron
- Bally, Oscar; Scholl, Roland (May–June 1911). "Einwirkung von Glycerin und Schwefelsäure auf amidierte und auf stickstofffreie Verbindungen der Anthracen-Reihe: Benzanthron und seine Reduktionsprodukte, nebst Bemerkungen über Namenbildung und Ortsbezeichnung hochgegliederter Ringsysteme der Anthracen-Reihe". Berichte der deutschen chemischen Gesellschaft (in German). 44 (2): 1656–1670. doi:10.1002/cber.19110440264. ISSN 0365-9496. Description of the Bally-Scholl synthesis
- Scholl, Roland; Meyer, Kurt (4 May 1932). "Synthese des anti-diperi-Dibenz-coronens und dessen Abbau zum Coronen (Hexabenzo-benzol). (Mitbearbeitet von Horst v. Hoeßle und Solon Brissimdji)". Berichte der deutschen chemischen Gesellschaft (in German). 65 (5): 902–915. doi:10.1002/cber.19320650546. ISSN 0365-9496. On the first synthesis of coronene
- Scholl, Roland; Holdermann, Karl; Seer, Christian (May 1949). "Versuche zur Darstellung von Harnsäure durch Oxydation nichtcyclischer Aminosäureamide. (Unter Mitwirkung von Paul Walenta.)". Chemische Berichte (in German). 82 (3): 239–246. doi:10.1002/cber.19490820314. ISSN 0365-9496. Scholl's final article, written from memory in the refugee camp
