= Scholl reaction =

Named after	Roland Scholl
Reaction type	Coupling reaction

Identifiers
RSC ontology ID	RXNO:0000377

The Scholl reaction is a coupling reaction between two arene compounds with the aid of a Lewis acid and a protic acid. It is named after its discoverer, Roland Scholl, a Swiss chemist.

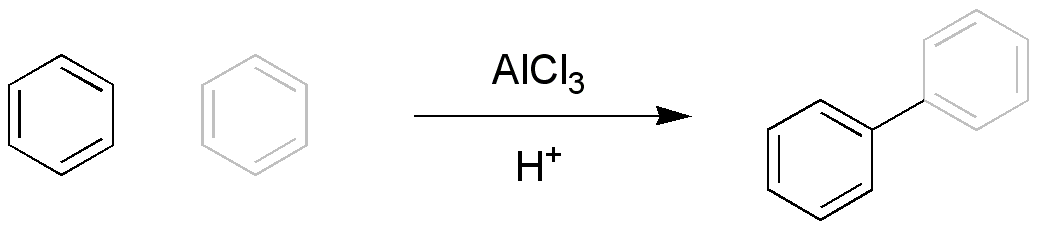
The Scholl reaction

In 1910 Scholl reported the synthesis of a quinone and of perylene from naphthalene both with aluminum chloride. Perylene was also synthesised from 1,1’-binaphthalene in 1913. The synthesis of Benzanthrone was reported in 1912.

The protic acid in the Scholl reaction is often an impurity in the Lewis Acid and also formed in the course of a Scholl reaction. Reagents are iron(III) chloride in dichloromethane, copper(II) chloride, PIFA and boron trifluoride etherate in dichloromethane, Molybdenum(V) chloride and lead tetraacetate with BF_{3} in acetonitrile.

Given the high reaction temperature and the requirement for strongly acidic catalysts the chemical yield often is low and the method is not a popular one. Intramolecular reactions fare better than the intermolecular ones, for instance in the organic synthesis of 9-phenylfluorene:

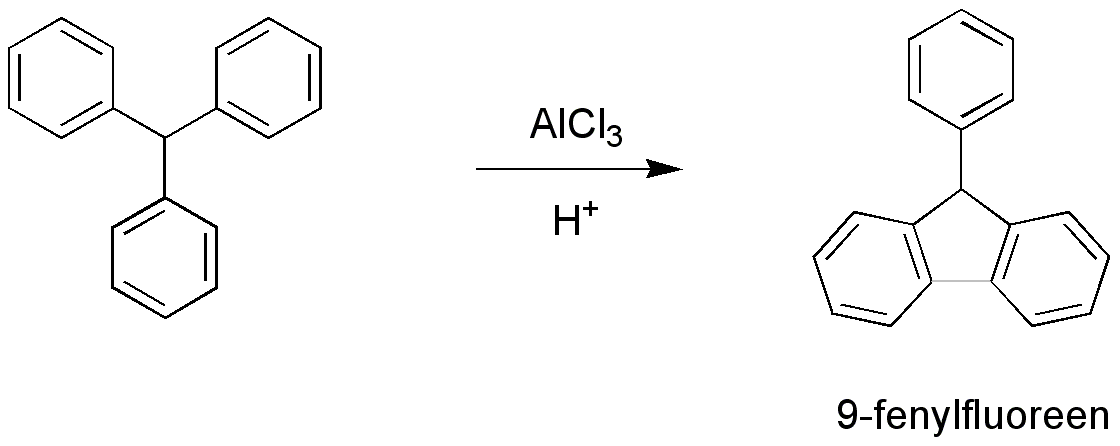
An example of the Scholl reaction

Or the formation of the pyrene dibenzo-(a.1)-pyrene from the anthracene 1-phenylbenz(a)anthracene (66% yield).

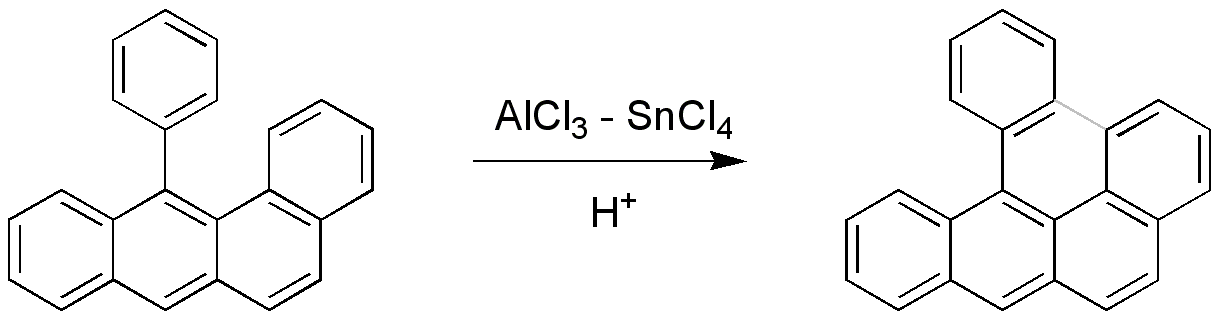
An example of the Scholl reaction

One study showed that the reaction lends itself to cascade reactions to form more complex polycyclic aromatic hydrocarbons

In certain applications such as triphenylene synthesis this reaction is advocated as an alternative for the Suzuki reaction. A recurring problem is oligomerization of the product which can be prevented by blocking tert-butyl substituents:

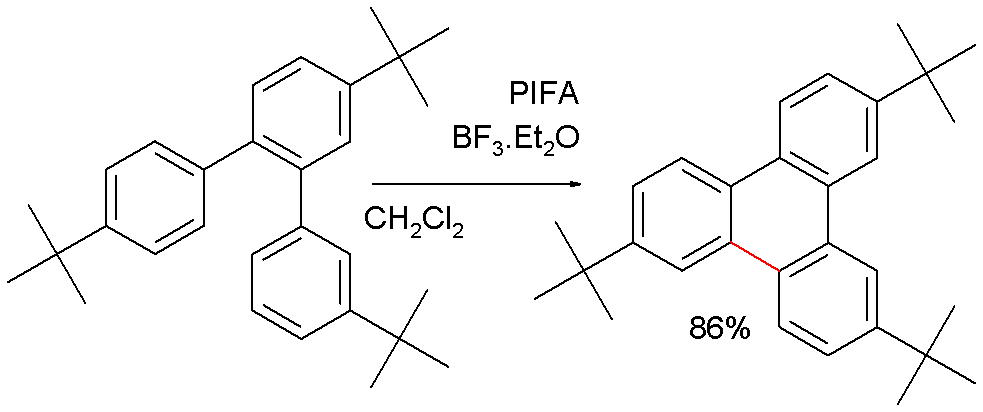
Scholl reaction Blocking Substituents

== Reaction mechanism ==
The exact reaction mechanism is not known but could very well proceed through an arenium ion. Just as in electrophilic aromatic substitution, Activating groups such as methoxy improve yield and selectivity:

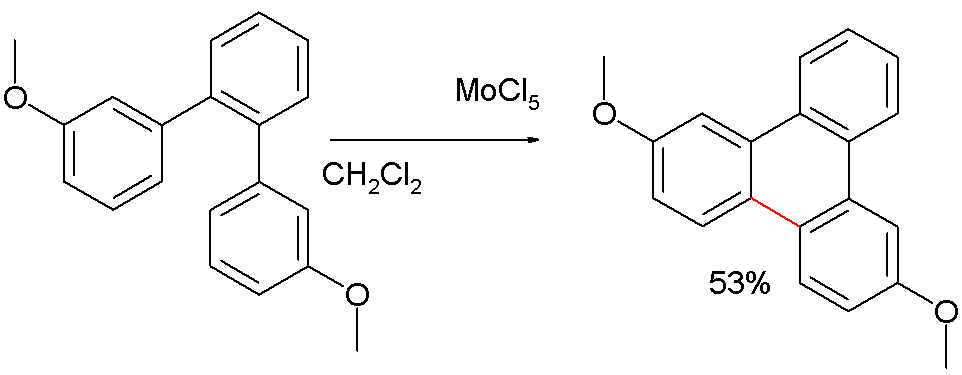
Scholl Reaction Para directors

Indeed, oxidative coupling of phenols is a research strategy in modern organic synthesis.

Two mechanisms may compete. In step one of a radical cation mechanism a radical cation is formed from one reaction partner by oxidation, in step two the radical ion attacks the second neutral partner in a substitution reaction and a new radical ion is formed with one ring bearing the positive charge and the other one the radical position. In step three dihydrogen is split off with rearomatisation to the biaryl compound. In the arenium ion mechanism one reaction partner is protonated to an arenium ion which then attacks the second reaction partner. The arenium ion can also be formed by attack of the Lewis acid. The mechanisms are difficult to distinguish because many Lewis acids can behave as oxidants. Reactions taking place at room-temperature with well-known one-electron oxidizing agents likely proceed through a radical cation mechanism and reactions requiring elevated temperatures likely proceed through an arenium ion mechanism.

== See also ==
- Friedel-Crafts alkylation
