= Vat Yellow 1 =

Names
- Preferred IUPAC name Benzo[h]benzo[6,7]acridino[2,1,10,9-klmna]acridine-8,16-dione
- Other names: Flavanthrone; Pigment Yellow 24; Flavanthrene; Indofast Yellow; Sandothrene NGN

Identifiers
CAS Number	475-71-8
3D model (JSmol)	Interactive image
ChEMBL	ChEMBL137369
ChemSpider	61374
ECHA InfoCard	100.006.818
PubChem CID	68059
UNII	5FA52JAB7C
CompTox Dashboard (EPA)	DTXSID6060056
- InChI: InChI=1S/C28H12N2O2/c31-27-15-7-3-1-5-13(15)25-21-17(27)9-12-20-23(21)24-19(29-25)11-10-18-22(24)26(30-20)14-6-2-4-8-16(14)28(18)32/h1-12H Key: KJPJZBYFYBYKPK-UHFFFAOYSA-N
- SMILES: C1=CC=C2C(=C1)C3=NC4=C5C6=C(C=C4)C(=O)C7=CC=CC=C7C6=NC8=C5C3=C(C2=O)C=C8

Properties
Chemical formula	C_{28}H_{12}O_{2}N_{2}
Molar mass	408.40708 g/mol
Magnetic susceptibility (χ)	−241.0·10^{−6} cm^{3}/mol
- Except where otherwise noted, data are given for materials in their standard state (at 25 °C [77 °F], 100 kPa). Infobox references

Vat Yellow 1 is a vat dye, yellow in appearance under some conditions used in cloth dyeing.

The compound is of significance in the history of synthetic colourants. It was first prepared in an era when anthraquinone dyes were being first investigated, inspired by the structure recently proposed for alizarin, a popular natural dye. Related work led to the discovery of the indanthrone.
