= Disperse dye =

Dye for synthetic polymers

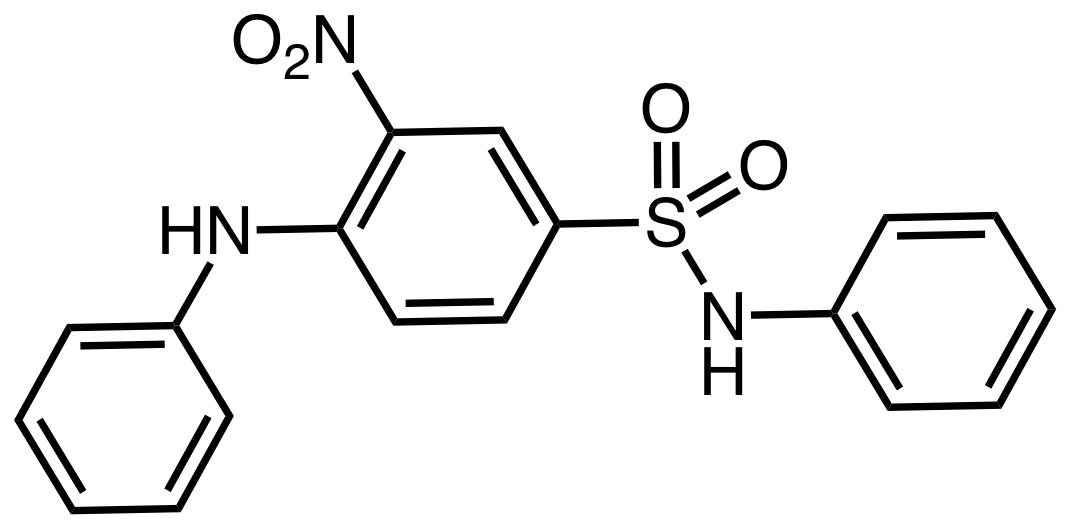
Structure of Disperse Yellow 42

Disperse dye is a category of synthetic dye intended for polyester and related hydrophobic fibers. Disperse dyes are polar molecules containing anthraquinone or azo groups. It is estimated that 85% of disperse dyes are azos or anthraquinone dyes.

== History ==
The history of disperse dye production is closely related to the synthesis of cellulose acetate fibres. Disperse dyes were invented in 1923-24.

== Fundamentals of dyeing ==
Disperse dyes are non-ionic in nature and partially soluble in water. The interaction of dye molecule and polymer takes place with Van der Waals and dipole forces. Disperse dyes have better diffusion at boiling to a higher temperature.

== Examples ==
- Disperse Blue dyes, especially 106 and 124, are common causes of contact allergy.
- Disperse Orange 1 is an azo dye.
- Disperse Red 9 is a red dye derived from anthraquinone.
- Disperse Red 11, also called C.I. 62015 and 1,4-diamino-2-methoxy anthraquinone, is another anthraquinone dye.
- Disperse Red 60 is also an anthraquinone dye.
- Disperse Yellow 26 is a yellow disperse dye.
- Disperse Yellow 42 is prepared by the reaction of two equivalents of aniline with 4-chloro-3-nitrobenzenesulfonyl chloride.
- Disperse Yellow 56 is a yellow disazo (double azo) dye.
