= Disperse Yellow 56 =

Identifiers
CAS Number	54077-16-6
3D model (JSmol)	Interactive image
ChemSpider	23351345
ECHA InfoCard	100.132.854
EC Number	611-091-7
PubChem CID	136164957
- InChI: InChI=1S/C21H15N5O2/c27-20-17-8-4-5-9-18(17)22-21(28)19(20)26-25-16-12-10-15(11-13-16)24-23-14-6-2-1-3-7-14/h1-13H,(H2,22,27,28) Key: GZCKCZAMIMLHDK-UHFFFAOYSA-N
- SMILES: C1=CC=C(C=C1)N=NC2=CC=C(C=C2)N=NC3=C(C4=CC=CC=C4NC3=O)O
- Except where otherwise noted, data are given for materials in their standard state (at 25 °C [77 °F], 100 kPa). Infobox references

Disperse Yellow 56 is a disazo dye from the group of disperse dyes that is used in the textile industry for dyeing polyester.

== Properties ==
The dye may be carcinogenic due to reductive cleavage into carcinogenic arylamines. Therefore, the use of disperse dyes such as Disperse Yellow 56, Disperse Yellow 23, Disperse Yellow 7, and Disperse Red 151, which are derived from p-aminoazobenzene, is highly restricted, and they are included on the Restricted Substances List (RSL) of organizations such as the Apparel and Footwear International RSL Management Group (AFIRM).
