= Lightfastness =

Ability of a colorant or material to withstand change due to light exposure

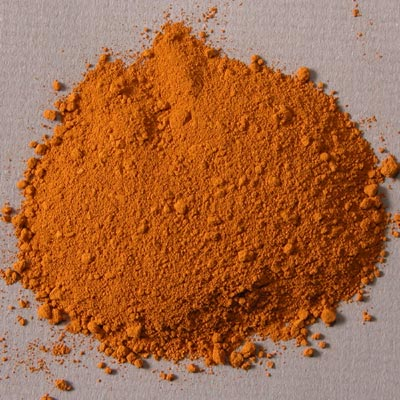
Clay earth pigments such as burnt sienna often have a high lightfastness

Lightfastness is a property of a colourant such as dye or pigment that describes its resistance to fading when exposed to light. Dyes and pigments are used for example for dyeing of fabrics, plastics or other materials and manufacturing paints or printing inks.

The bleaching of the color is caused by the impact of ultraviolet radiation on the chemical structure of the molecules giving the color of the subject. The part of a molecule responsible for its color is called the chromophore.

Light encountering a painted surface can either alter or break the chemical bonds of the pigment, causing the colors to bleach or change in a process known as photodegradation. Materials that resist this effect are said to be lightfast. The electromagnetic spectrum of the sun contains wavelengths from gamma waves to radio waves. The high energy of ultraviolet radiation in particular accelerates the fading of the dye.

The photon energy of UVA-radiation which is not absorbed by atmospheric ozone exceeds the dissociation energy of the carbon-carbon single bond, resulting in the cleavage of the bond and fading of the color. Inorganic colourants are considered to be more lightfast than organic colourants. Black colourants are usually considered the most lightfast.

Lightfastness is measured by exposing a sample to a lightsource for a predefined period of time and then comparing it to an unexposed sample.

== Chemical processes ==
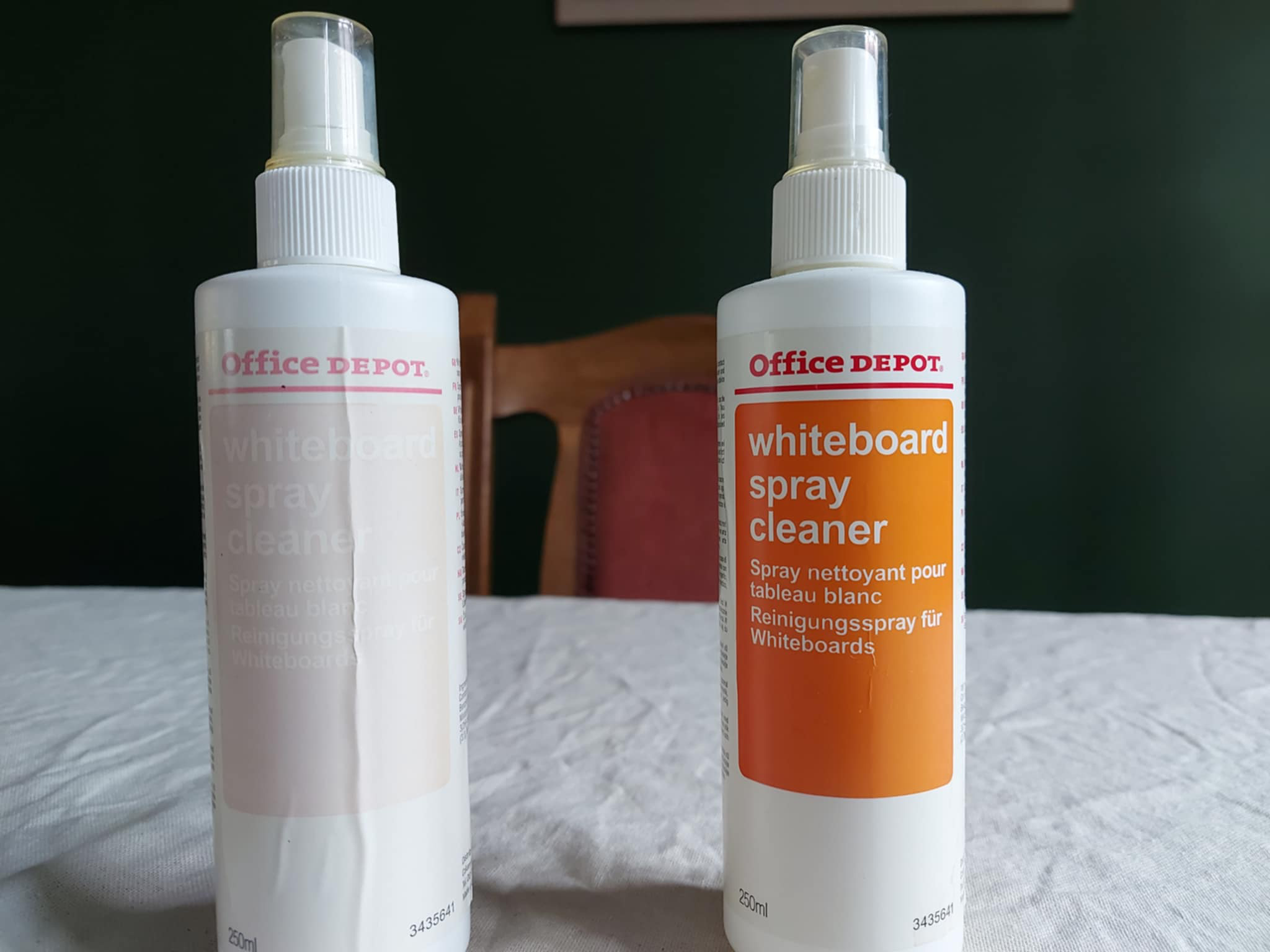
Two identical bottles purchased at the same time, one kept near a window for ten years, the other in a cupboard.

During the fading, colourant molecules undergo various chemical processes which result in fading.

When a UV-photon reacts with a molecule acting as colourant, the molecule is excited from the ground state to an excited state. The excited molecule is highly reactive and unstable. During the quenching of the molecule from excited state to ground state, atmospheric triplet oxygen reacts with the colourant molecule to form singlet oxygen and superoxide oxygen radical. The oxygen atom and the superoxide radical resulting from the reaction are both highly reactive and capable of destroying the colourants.

=== Photolysis ===
Photolysis, i.e., photochemical decomposition is a chemical reaction where the compound is broken down by the photons. This decomposition occurs when a photon of sufficient energy encounters a colorant molecule bond with a suitable dissociation energy. The reaction causes homolytic cleavage in the chromophoric system resulting in the fading of the colourant.

=== Photo-oxidation ===
Photo-oxidation, i.e., photochemical oxidation. A colorant molecule, when excited by a photon of sufficient energy, undergoes an oxidation process. In the process the chromophoric system of the colorant molecule reacts with the atmospheric oxygen to form a non-chromophoric system, resulting in fading. Colorants which contain a carbonyl group as the chromophore are particularly vulnerable to oxidation.

=== Photoreduction ===
Photo-reduction, i.e., photochemical reduction. A colorant molecule with an unsaturated double bond (typical to alkenes) or triple bond (typical to alkynes) acting as a chromophore undergoes reduction in the presence of hydrogen and photons of sufficient energy, forming a saturated chromophoric system. Saturation reduces the length of the chromophoric system, resulting in the fading of the colorant.

=== Photosensitization ===
Photosensitization, i.e., photochemical sensitization. Exposing dyed cellulosic material, such as plant-based fibers, to sunlight allows dyes to remove hydrogen from the cellulose, resulting in photoreduction on the cellulosic substrate. Simultaneously, the colorant will undergo oxidation in the presence of the atmospheric oxygen, resulting in photo-oxidation of the colourant. These processes result in both fading of the colorant and strength loss of the substrate.

=== Phototendering ===
Phototendering, i.e., photochemical tendering. As a result of UV light, the substrate material supplies hydrogen to the colourant molecules, reducing the colorant molecule. As the hydrogen is removed, the material undergoes oxidation.

== Standards and measure scales ==
Some organizations publish standards for rating the lightfastness of pigments and materials. Testing is typically done by controlled exposure to sunlight, or to artificial light generated by a xenon arc lamp. Watercolors, inks, pastels, and colored pencils are particularly susceptible to fading over time, so choosing lightfast pigments is especially important in these media.

The most well known scales measuring the lightfastness are the Blue Wool Scale, Grey scale and the scale defined by ASTM (American Standard Test Measure). On the Blue Wool Scale the lightfastness is rated between 1–8. 1 being very poor and 8 being excellent lightfastness. In grey scale the lightfastness is rated between 1–5. 1 being very poor and 5 being excellent lightfastness. On ASTM scale the lightfastness is rated between I-V. I is excellent lightfastness and it corresponds to ratings 7–8 on Blue Wool Scale. V is very poor lightfastness and it corresponds to Blue Wool scale rating 1.

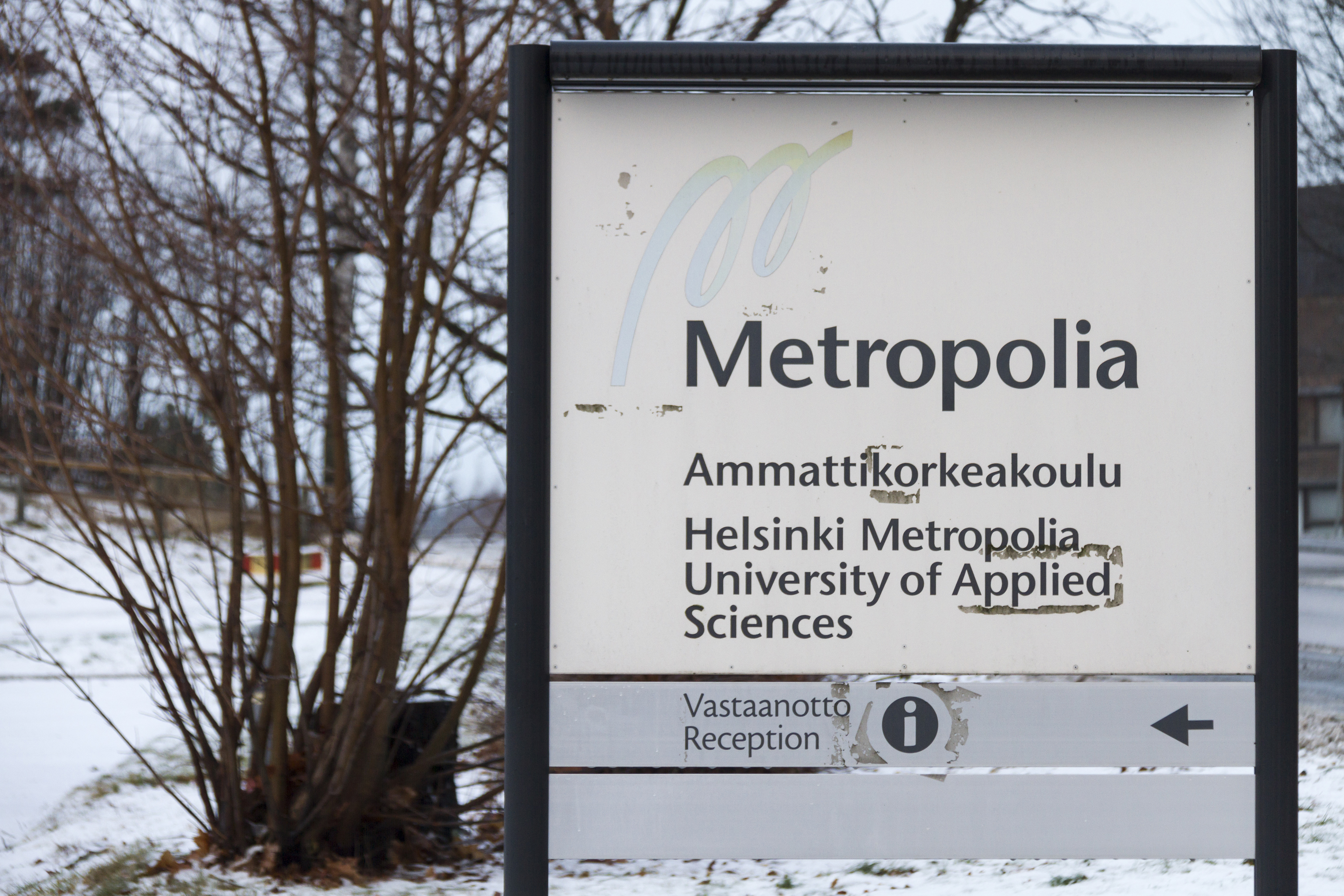
Side of a sign of the University of Applied Sciences oriented towards the southeast where direct sunlight impacting from dawn to afternoon has bleached the red and yellow colors from the logo of the institution.

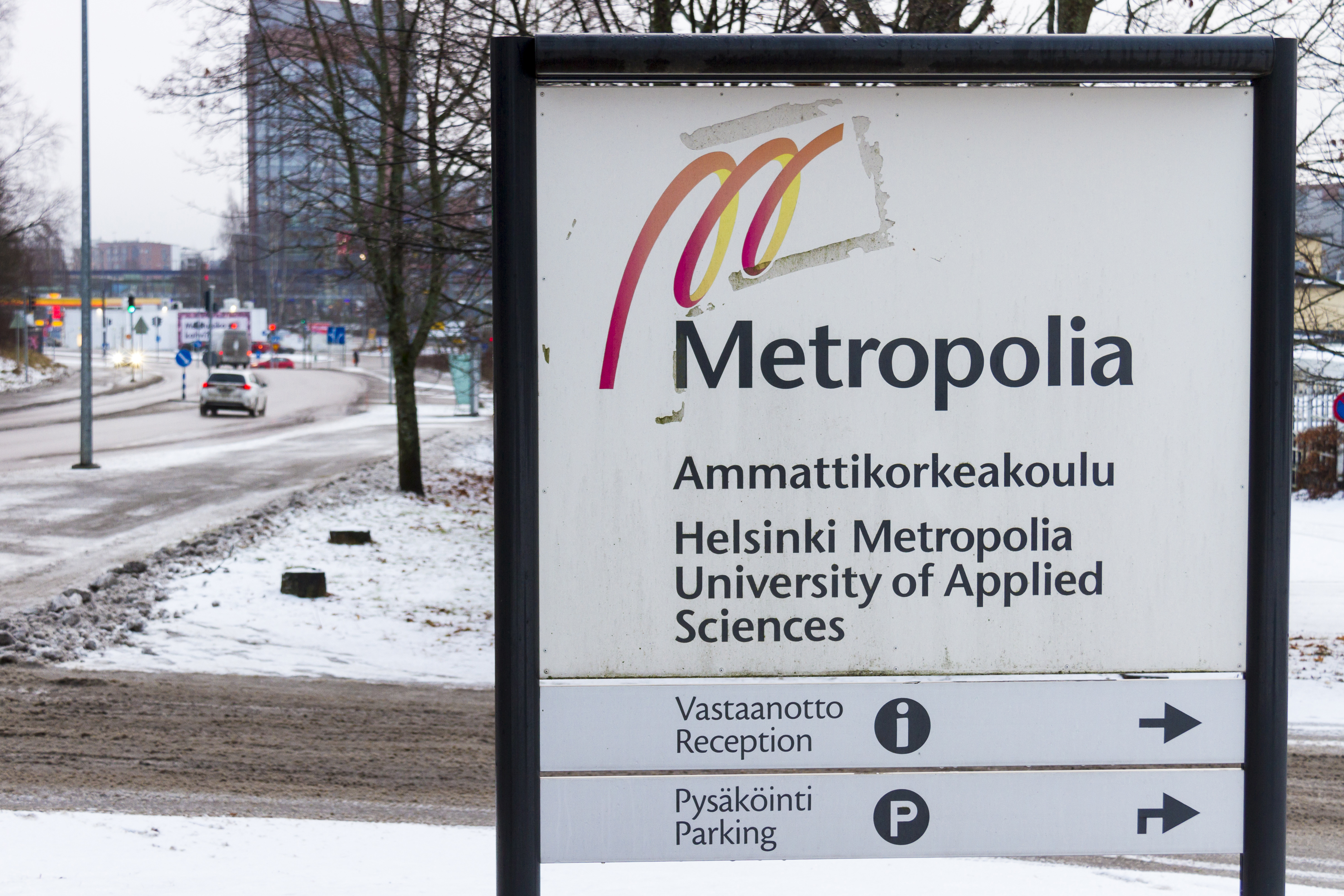
Side of the sign oriented towards the northwest where the red and yellow colors can still be clearly recognized.

The actual lightfastness is dependent on the strength of the radiation of the sun, so lightfastness is relative to geographic location, season, and exposure direction. The following table is listing suggestive relations of the lightfastness ratings on different measure scales and the relation relative to time in direct sunlight and normal conditions of display: away from a window, under indirect sunlight and properly framed behind a UV protective glass.

Description	Measure scales		Direct exposure		Normal conditions of display
	Blue Wool rating	ASTM rating	Summer	Winter	
Very poor lightfastness	1	V			less than 2 years
Poor lightfastness	2	IV			2–15 years
Poor lightfastness	3	IV	4–8 days	2–4 weeks	2–15 years
Fair lightfastness	4	III	2–3 weeks	2–3 months	15–50 years
Fair lightfastness	5	III	3–5 weeks	4–5 months	15–50 years
Very good lightfastness	6	II	6–8 weeks	5–6 months	50–100 years
Excellent lightfastness	7	I	3–4 months	7–9 months	over 100 years
Excellent lightfastness	8	I	over 1.5 years		over 100 years

== Test procedure ==
The relative amount of fading can be measured and studied by using standard test strips. In the workflow of the Blue Wool test, one reference strip set shall be stored protected from any exposure to light. Simultaneously, another equivalent test strip set is exposed under a light source defined in the standard. For example, if the lightfastness of the colourant is indicated to be 5 on the Blue Wool scale, it can be expected to fade by a similar amount as the strip number 5 in the Blue Wool test strip set. The success of the test can be confirmed by comparing the test strip set with the reference set that was stored protected from the light.

== In graphical industry ==
In printing, organic pigments are mainly used in the inks, so the shifting or bleaching of the color of a printing product due to the presence of UV light is usually just a matter of time. The use of organic pigments is justified primarily by their inexpensive cost compared to inorganic pigments. The particle size of the inorganic pigments is often larger than that of organic pigments, thus inorganic pigments are often not suitable to be used in offset printing.

In screen printing, the particle size of the pigment is not the limiting factor. Thus it is the preferred printing method for printing jobs requiring extreme lightfastness. The thickness of the ink layer affects the lightfastness by the amount of pigment laid on the substrate. The ink layer printed by screen printing is thicker than that printed by offset printing. In other words, it contains more pigment per area. This leads to better lightfastness even though the printing ink used in both methods would be based on the same pigment.

When mixing printing inks, the ink with the weaker lightfastness defines the lightfastness of the whole mixed color. The fading of one of the pigments leads to a tone shift towards the component with better lightfastness. If it is required that there will be something visible from the printing, even though its dominant pigment would fade, then a small amount of pigment with excellent lightfastness can be mixed with it.

== See also ==
- Blue Wool Scale – a measure of dye permanence
- Color fastness – resistance to fading of textile colors
- Fugitive pigment – pigments that are susceptible to fading or altering over time
