= Blue Wool Scale =

System for rating the colorfastness of dyes and inks

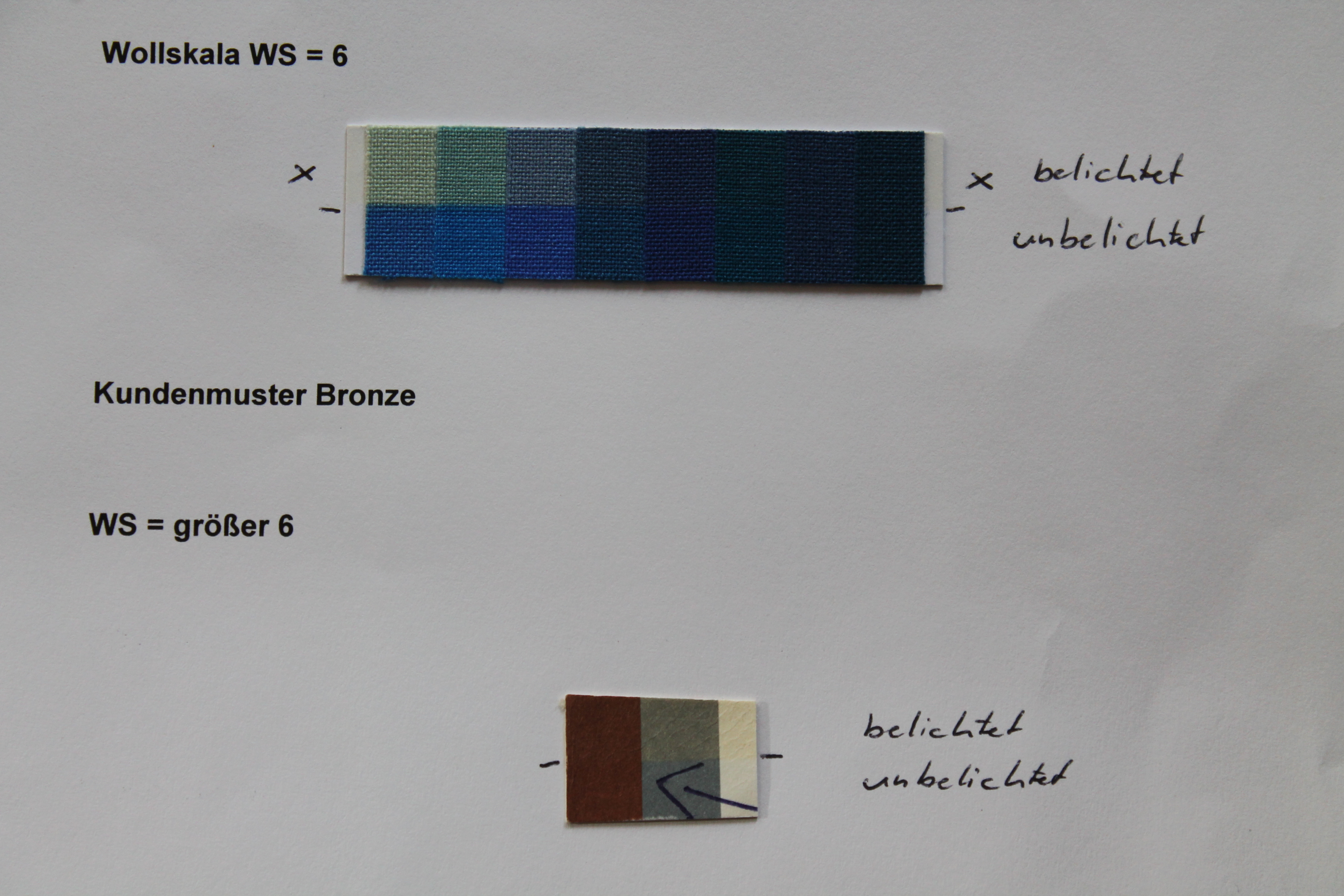

The Blue Wool Scale measures and calibrates the permanence of colouring dyes. Traditionally this test was developed for the textiles industry but it has now been adopted by the printing industry as measure of lightfastness of ink colourants. The American Association of Textile Chemists and Colorists pioneered the work on these test methods and together with the ASTM D13 committee.

Normally two identical dye samples are created. One is placed in the dark as the control and the other is placed in the equivalent of sunlight for a three-month period. A standard blue wool textile fading test card is also placed in the same light conditions as the sample under test. The amount of fading of the sample is then assessed by comparison to the original colour.

A rating between 0 and 8 is awarded by identifying which one of the eight strips on the bluewool standard card has faded to the same extent as the sample under test.

Zero denotes extremely poor colour fastness whilst a rating of eight is deemed not to have altered from the original and thus credited as being lightfast and permanent.

The ultraviolet (UV) radiation in light is responsible for ink fading. As the intensity of UV radiation differs from place to place, the ink fading also depends on place. It will be more in areas with more UV radiation and vice versa. This difficulty is overcome by the bluewool testing method. Absolute values of fading will depend on light intensity. Relative values of fading, comparing the sample with the standard blue test strip, will depend less on intensity. For example, if a pigment is rated as "BW5" it can be expected to fade to the same degree as strip number 5 on a bluewool test card, for any specific light exposure. The method of comparison between the sample and a test strip enables accelerated testing to be carried out under intense artificial illumination.
