= Disperse Red 60 =

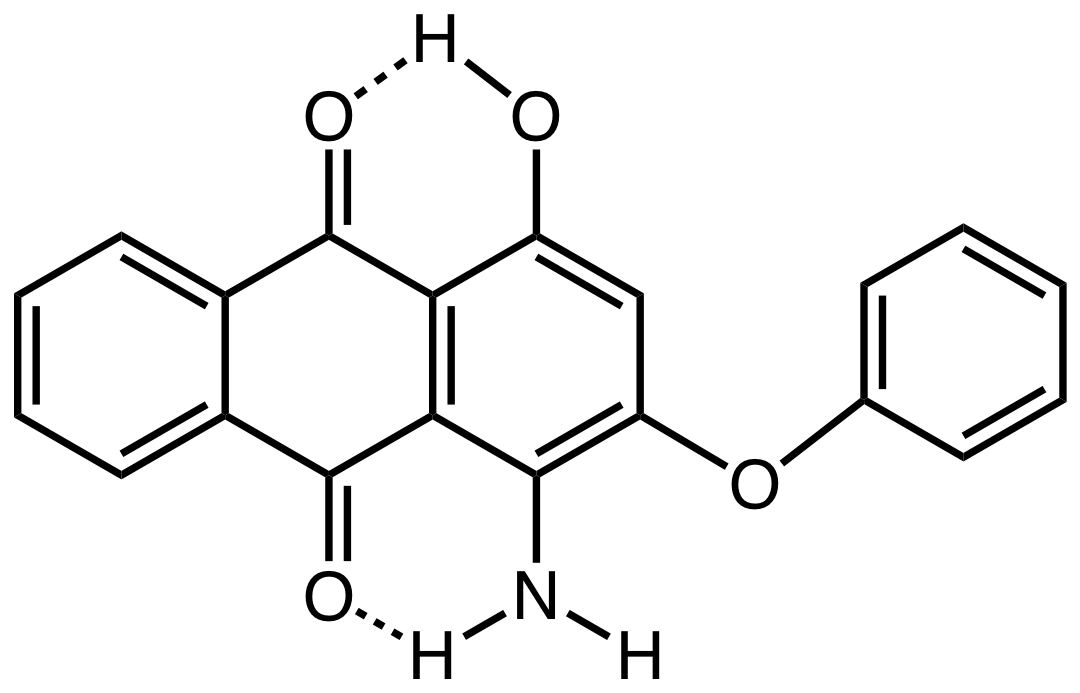

Names
- Other names 1-Amino-4-hydroxy-2-phenoxyanthraquinone; C.I. 60756 (Colour index numbers)

Identifiers
CAS Number	17418-58-5
3D model (JSmol)	Interactive image
ChEMBL	ChEMBL3561744
ChemSpider	26544
ECHA InfoCard	100.037.659
EC Number	241-442-6
PubChem CID	28531
UNII	T4431S01IG
CompTox Dashboard (EPA)	DTXSID2025210
- InChI: InChI=1S/C20H13NO4/c21-18-15(25-11-6-2-1-3-7-11)10-14(22)16-17(18)20(24)13-9-5-4-8-12(13)19(16)23/h1-10,22H,21H2 Key: MHXFWEJMQVIWDH-UHFFFAOYSA-N
- SMILES: C1=CC=C(C=C1)OC2=C(C3=C(C(=C2)O)C(=O)C4=CC=CC=C4C3=O)N

Properties
Chemical formula	C_{20}H_{13}NO_{4}
Molar mass	331.327 g·mol^{−1}
Appearance	dark red solid
Density	1.44 g/cm^{3}
Melting point	185 °C (365 °F; 458 K)

Hazards
- GHS labelling
Pictograms	(GHS07: Exclamation mark)
Signal word	Warning
Hazard statements	H317, H319
Precautionary statements	P261, P264, P272, P280, P302+P352, P305+P351+P338, P321, P333+P313, P337+P313, P363, P501
- Except where otherwise noted, data are given for materials in their standard state (at 25 °C [77 °F], 100 kPa). Infobox references

Disperse Red 60, or 1-amino-4-hydroxy-2-phenoxyanthraquinone, is a common disperse dye of the anthraquinone family of dyes. It is a dark red solid that is insoluble in water but soluble in dichloromethane.

Because Disperse Red 60 is produced on a large scale, its disposal or degradation has received considerable attention.
