= History of synthetic colourants =

Chemical compound

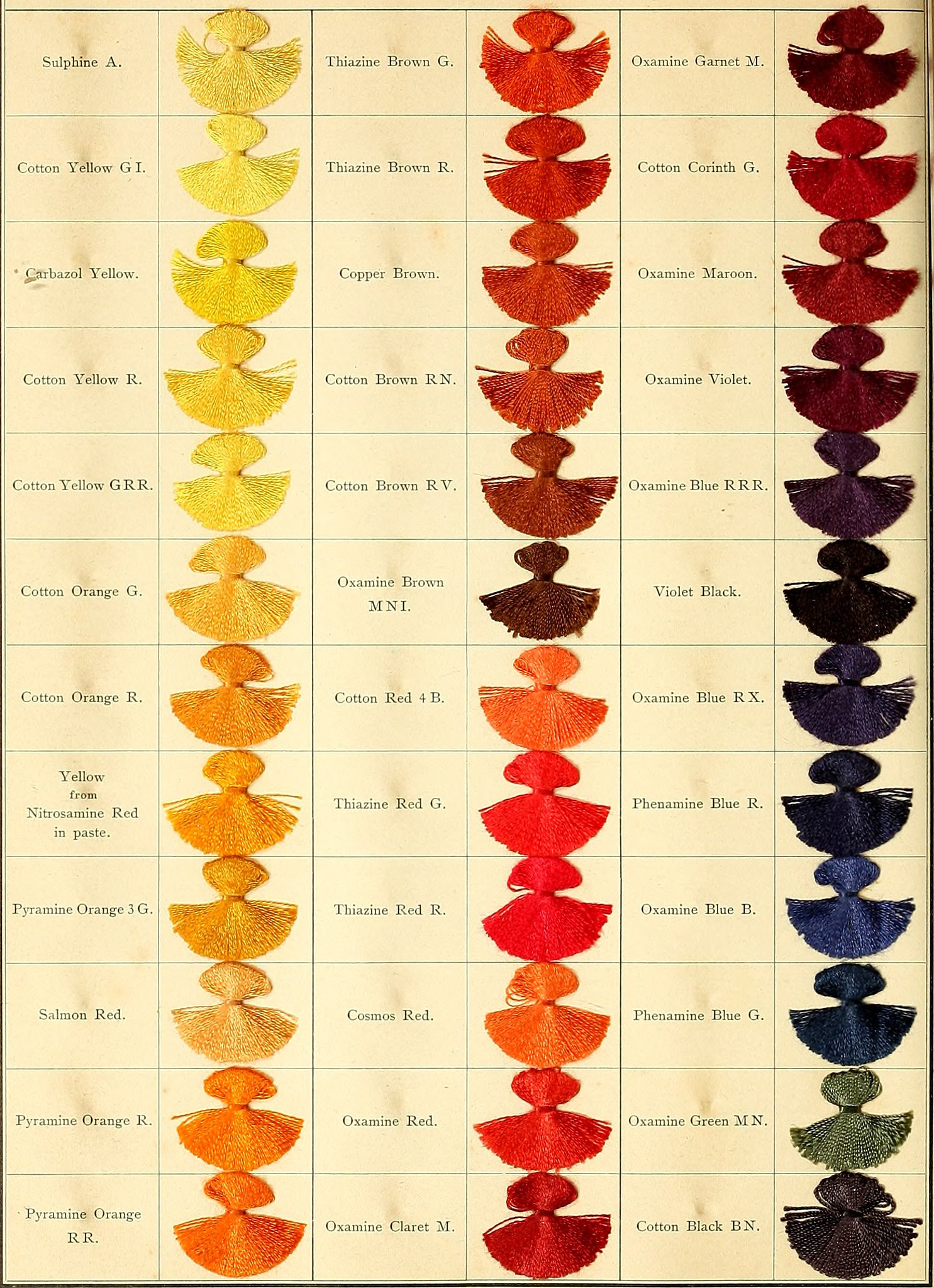
Tassels dyed with BASF dyes 1901

A colorant is any substance that changes the spectral transmittance or reflectance of a material. Synthetic colorants are those created in a laboratory or industrial setting. The production and improvement of colorants was a driver of the early synthetic chemical industry, in fact many of today's largest chemical producers started as dye-works in the late 19th or early 20th centuries, including Bayer AG (1863). "Synthetics" achieve intensity, color fastness, and reproducibility that natural materials can rarely match. Market viable large scale production of dyes occurred nearly simultaneously in the early major producing countries United Kingdom of Great Britain and Ireland (1857), Second French Empire (1858), German Confederation (1858), and Switzerland (1859), and expansion of associated chemical industries followed. The mid-19th century through World War II saw an incredible expansion of the variety and scale of manufacture of synthetic colorants. Synthetic colorants quickly became ubiquitous in everyday life, from clothing to food. This stems from the invention of industrial research and development laboratories in the 1870s, and the new awareness of empirical chemical formulas as targets for synthesis by academic chemists. The dye industry became one of the first instances where directed scientific research lead to new products, and the first where this occurred regularly.

== Dyes versus pigments ==
Colorants can be divided into pigments and dyes. Broadly, dyes are soluble and become fixed to a substrate via impregnation, while pigments are insoluble and require a binding agent to adhere to a substrate. Dyes, therefore, must have an affinity for the substance they are intended to color. Chemically speaking, pigments can be organic or inorganic, while dyes are only organic. Furthermore, organic white pigments do not exist, despite the fact that the majority of purified crystalline organic products are white in appearance. This story is complicated somewhat by lake pigments, or lakes, which are dyes modified with a chemical process to form an insoluble pigment. Typically this involves precipitating the natural extracts as salts in alkaline conditions. The historical importance of both pigments and dyes is closely related, as the markets for both, as well as the types and variety available, have always been closely tied.

== History ==
Early colorants date to prehistoric times. Human beings were already relying on natural substances, primarily from vegetables, but also from animals, to color their homes and artifacts. Cave drawings like those in Altamira or Lascaux were made in the Ice Age 15,000 to 30,000 years ago. Using pigments for coloration is among the oldest cultural activities of mankind. The important substrates of pre-industrial societies were generally naturally occurring (cotton, silk, wool, leather, paper) and therefore share similarities, since they are primarily saccharide or peptide polymers.

The 19th and 20th century in particular saw an expansion in colorant use and production, yielding many pigments and dyes in use today. The availability of strong acidic or alkaline environments like sulphuric acid and synthetic sodium carbonate was crucial in this process. These conditions became possible due to price drops in reagents due to new industrial preparations like the LeBlanc process, where potassium carbonate formerly obtained from ashes was replaced by sodium carbonate. However, many early colorants are no longer produced due to economics, or high toxicity, for example Schweinfurt green (cupric acetate arsenite), Scheele's green (copper(II) arsenite), and Naples yellow (lead antimonate).

The late 1850s saw the introduction of the first modern synthetic dyes, which brought more color and variety of color to Europe. In addition to being multi-varied and extraordinarily intense, these new dyes were notoriously unstable, rapidly fading and turning when exposed to sunlight, washing, and other chemical or physical agents. This led to new systems of categorization and study of colorants, which in turn lead to the synthesis of more color-fast modern colorants. Synthetic colors found themselves in not only dyes and paints but also inks and foodstuffs, permeating consumer culture.

=== First "scientific" syntheses: aniline dyes 1858 – 1870 ===
In the mid 19th century, the coal tar industry, particularly in England, produced the precursors needed for a large amount of organic syntheses, in large quantities. For the first eight years after the first marketable synthetic dye, Mauveine, until the middle of the 1860s, British and French firms were the major dye producers. The second half of the 1860s saw German dye works surpassing their competition in both capacity and market share. During 1870, German firms were responsible for roughly half of the world's production of dyes and pigments. Aniline dyes were produced at scale, in part because of many advances in the synthesis of their precursors. Antoine Bechamp described a process for reducing nitrobenzene to aniline in 1854, known as the Bechamp Process, making the production of aniline easy. Widespread isolation of phenol from coal tar, made its nitration more economical, generally the path of the synthesis flowed: coal tar → nitrobenzene → aniline → dyes. According to Henry Perkin himself "This industry holds an [sic] unique position in the history of chemical industries, as it was entirely the outcome of scientific research."

==== First scientific synthetic dye: picric acid ====
The first synthetic dye was picric acid. It was prepared in a laboratory in 1771, and commercially produced by M. Guinon in Lyon in 1845. It dyed silk fabric yellow; however the color fastness properties were not good, thus it had very limited commercial success. It was, however, purchased in limited amounts by French dyers.

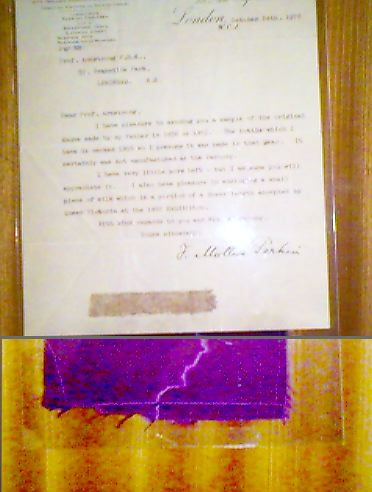
A letter with a sample of mauveine dyed silk

==== William Henry Perkin’s mauveine ====
In 1856, 18 year old William Perkin accidentally discovered a dye he called mauve while trying to make quinine from the oxidation of allyl toluene in his home lab for his academic advisor and boss August Wilhelm von Hoffman. Hoffman reportedly referred to aniline, a major step in the synthesis, as his "first love," and was excited to have Perkin working with it. Perkin communicated with the textile industry, including Pullars of Perth, and John Hyde Christie, the chemist and general manager of John Orr Ewing and Co. about how to best market and produce his dye. He started production of aniline purple near London at the end of 1857 and remained the only producer for at least a few months. Perkin began making the intermediates for his dyes in-house, for example, nitro-benzene, expanding the scale of operations. By the summer of 1859, according to a satirical magazine Punch, London had fallen ill with 'the mauve measles'.

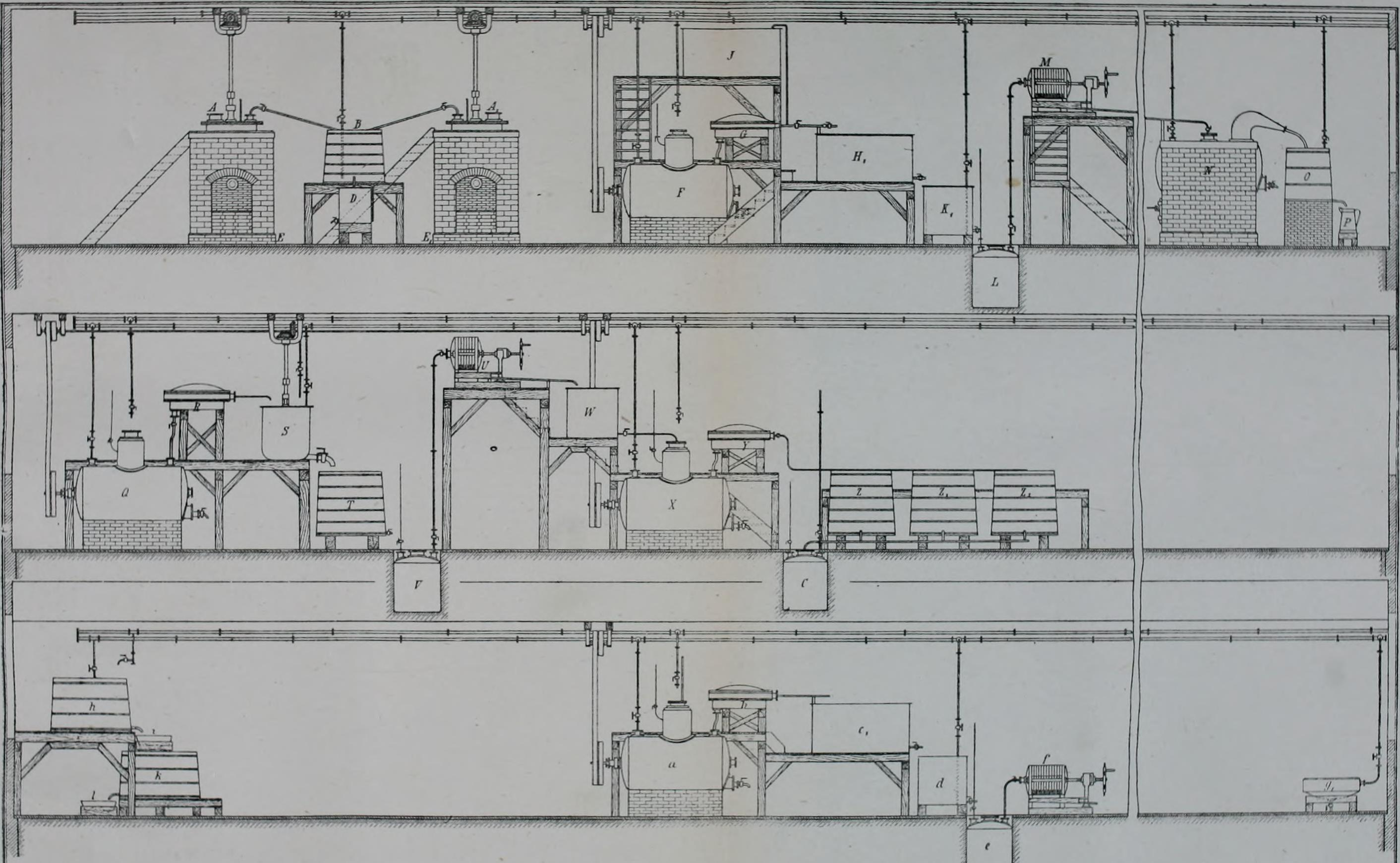
An illustration of an aniline dye-works in a journal of the period

==== Rapid expansion ====
By the end of 1858 there were already eight firms producing aniline dyes. By 1861 there were twenty-nine British patents on coloring matters from aniline. By 1864 68 firms were producing dyes. This was driven by the textile industry, which employed new designs requiring the colorful aniline dyes. Even Hofmann, who had at first criticized his student for leaving his academic research of quinine, later synthesized his own aniline dye, rosaniline. In 1858 the German chemist Johann Peter Griess obtained a yellow dye by reacting nitrous acid with aniline. It didn't last commercially, but it created even more interest in aniline as precursor for colorful compounds. French chemist François-Emmanuel Verguin reacted aniline with stannic chloride to yield fuchsine, a rose colored dye, the first of the triphenylmethane dyes. Further work by Hoffman along with the discovery of benzene’s structure (1858) and carbon’s tetravalency(1865), this science built the groundwork for modern organic chemistry.

In the late 1860s many companies began offering a full spectrum of colors, and were already outcompeting many natural dyes for market share. Prices continually fell, and new colors and products regularly entered the market. On January 1, 1868, there were 52 producers of aniline dyes. Members of enlightened scientific societies from all over Europe including the Manchester Literary & Philosophical Society competed for expertise and authority with dyers and printers in factories and workshops. Many soluble salts of acid dyes synthesized for textile-related purposes were transformed into insoluble salts or lake pigments by reaction with water-soluble salts of calcium, barium or lead, whereas basic dyes were treated with tannins or antimony potassium tartrate to yield pigments.

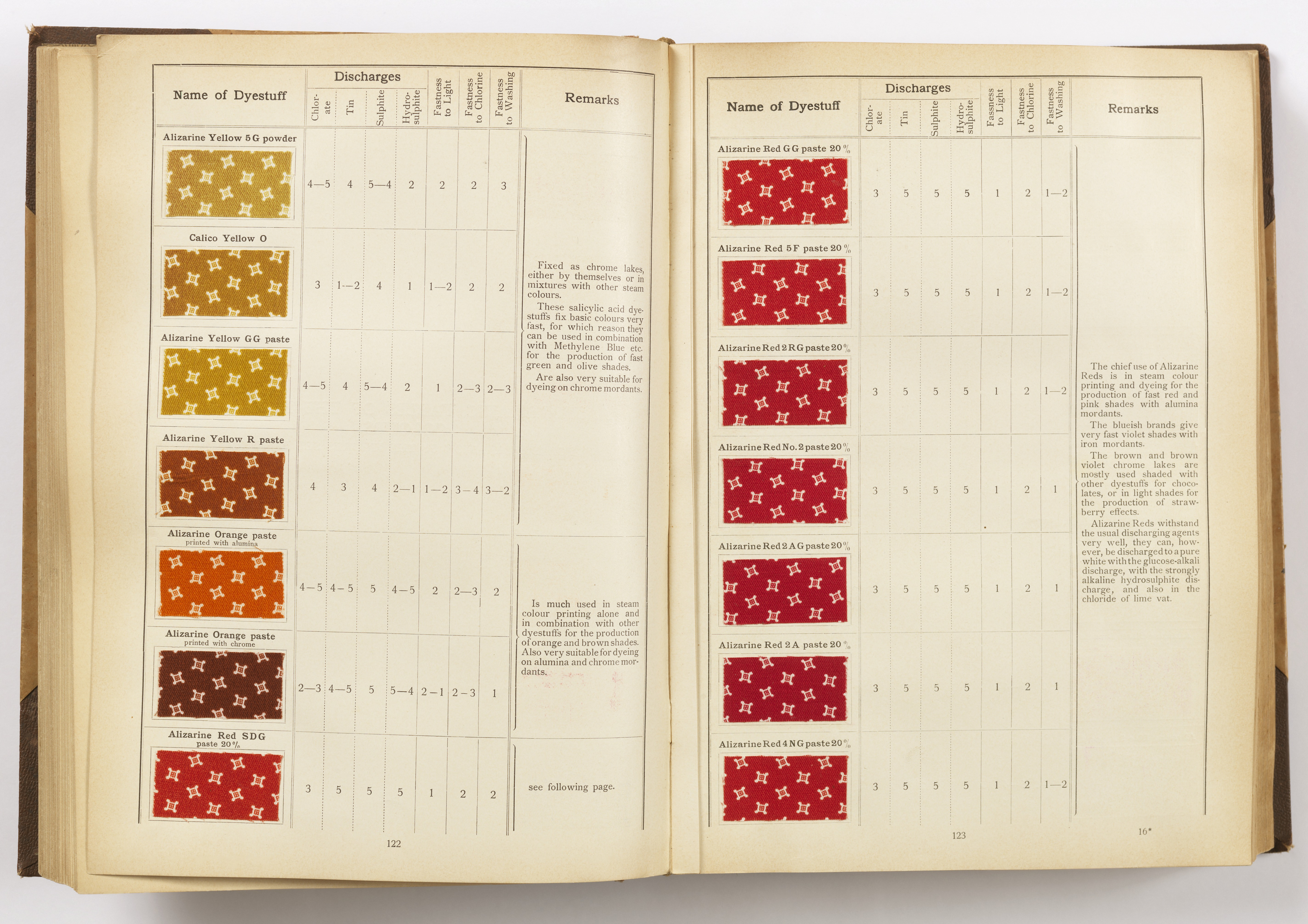
Synthetic coal tar alizarin dye samples, 1908. They are described systematically with their properties, such as fastness to light

=== Synthetic alizarin 1868 – 1873 ===
The development of synthetic alizarin opened up a huge market that was formerly served by natural dye makers. Alizarin was the first dye whose structure chemist determined, and they quickly set it as a target of synthesis, succeeding by 1868. Other chemical components of natural madder were identified and applied by the mid-19th century, including purpurin, which produced a delicate lilac colour, and green alizarin, which was patented in Britain and famously displayed at the 1867 Paris International Exhibition. Similar to aniline dyes, the precursors for Synthetic Alizarin were easily obtainable from coal tar. Germany dominated the synthetic alizarin market, however foreign competition was not non-extant, for example the British Alizarine Company Ltd.

=== Azo-dyes from coupling reactions 1878 – 1885 ===
In 1858 Peter Griess passed ‘nitrous fumes’ (N_{2}O_{3}) into a solution of picramic acid (2-amino-4,6-dinitrophenol) and isolated a product belonging to a new class of compounds: azo dyes. Later, a new class of azo dyes that were based on "coupling" reactions entered the market. The new azo dyes were easy to make and assumed a vast variety of incredibly intense colors based on the chosen precursors. The chemists Z. Roussin, Heinrich Caro, O. Witt, and P. Griess all put azo dyes on the market, and attempted to keep the syntheses as industrial secrets, Hoffman, however, determined the structure of their dyes and published his findings.

Solvent Yellow 7, a representative yellow azo dye compound

This caused another rapid expansion, particularly in Germany. Between 1877 and 1887, 130 German patents for azo dyes were filed and 105 new dyes made it to market. It also lead to a difference in how chemical companies interacted with consumers. German dye firms developed in-house marketing and distribution capabilities coordinated directly with their research and development departments. Paul Schützenberger, in response to what he had seen at the 1878 Universal Exposition commented, "The abundance, the variety of combinations is such that we do not know whether to be more amazed by their multiplicity or by the imagination required to name them. Indeed, it is by the thousands that dyers create, every season, new colors for their sample cards." Professional societies based on the synthetic dye industries began to form. By the First World War, the largest number of dyes sold in the market fell into the class of azo dyes. 1885, an azo-naphthol, Para-red, became the first water-insoluble organic pigment not containing acidic or basic groups.

=== New dyes and larger markets 1900 – 1913 ===
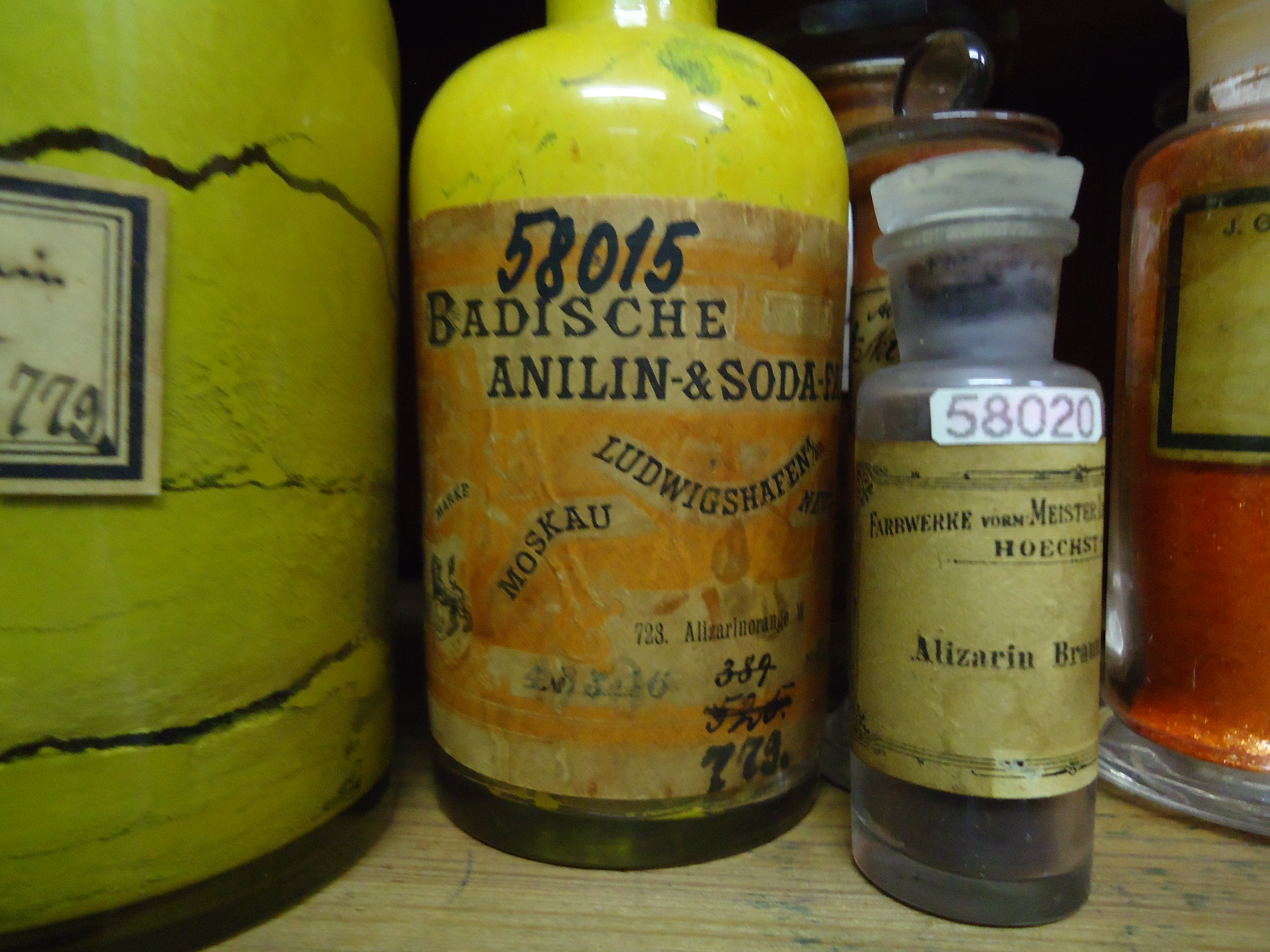
Historical BASF chemical products, including dyes

The rapid development of synthetic dyes in the late nineteenth century stems from the rise of industrial research laboratories in Germany, where firms such as BASF and Hoechst used university-trained chemists, designed new processes, and pioneered breakthroughs in synthetic coloring. With over 10 laboratories established between 1880 and 1890, scientists had formalized research practices and contributed to advances in dye chemistry through organized experimentation and chemical design, and made Germany a global leader in synthetic dye manufacturing.

The 20th century was again characterized by increases in scope and scale of chemical production. Pigments like cadmium selenide, manganese blue, molybdenum red, and bismuth vanadate were synthesized. High purity titanium dioxide and zinc oxide were produced for the first time on an industrial scale and introduced synthetic white pigments. The first insoluble organic pigments, the red naphthols, containing neither acid nor basic groups, were produced and sold. Furthermore, the quality of the new dyes increased. Chemist Rene Bohn developed a brilliant blue vat dye, indanthrone, with excellent color fastness in 1901. BASF(Badische Anilin und Soda Fabrik), the largest manufacturer of vat dyes, sold it as Indanthren Blue RS, along with the synthetic indigo they placed on the market in 1897. Allegedly James Morton, a leader in England's textile industry, was out walking when he saw some tapestries he produced using aniline dyes had already faded, despite only recently being put on display. He was so dismayed that he began to have dye samples exposed to the sun to check for light-fastness. He then employed a Scottish chemist named John Christie to synthesize dyes based on the chemical structures that were more stable to sunlight, and began to market the dyes in his products as fast dyes, or sundour, which can translate to "hard to move" in Scots.

Synthetic dyes were now produced in Britain, Germany, France, the US, Switzerland, Russia, the Austrian Empire, the Netherlands, Belgium, and Italy. At the end of this period, this grew to include Rumania (one firm), Greece (one firm), and Canada (two firms). The scale of the chemical plants also grew, for instance the Bayer company in 1907 had a reactor to make azo dye with a capacity of 20,000 liters. From 1900 to the first World War German firms controlled around 75% of the dye market. The concentration of chemical producers in Germany was perturbed by World War I, however, and the chemical industry of the United States of America in particular expanded rapidly, although Germany always remained a major player.

=== World War I and the American dye industry 1913 – 1930 ===
Through 1914, the US dye market was dominated by German imports, there were only a few small companies and German subsidiaries. With World War I, however, German dye factories now had to switch to making explosives and German shipping was cut off by British blockades. Prices quickly went up and U. S. companies built plants to meet demand. American pharmaceutical giants, even at that time, like Dow, DuPont, and others began to produce dyes and were extremely successful with simple sulphur and vat dyes. Dow Chemical developed a synthetic process for indigo in 1915, and American industry and universities worked together to reverse engineer German chemical production secrets. After the war some American munitions factories converted to dye-works, intuiting that if the reverse was possible for the German chemical industry during the war, then it ought to be feasible.

1881 Renoir painting featuring prominent use of bright red pigments

=== Artistic use ===
Synthetic colorants gained popularity as quickly with artists as with industry. The painters of the impressionist school in particular were famous early adopters. Critical reviews of Impressionists’ blues made comparisons to laundresses’ tubs, in particular the practice of laundry bluing, and to chemical waste dumped into the Seine by dye factories. One critic accused Edgar Degas, known for experiments in aquatint, pastel and oil painting as having an obsession with "chemistry," evoking a laboratory in description of his studio. Interestingly, Degas was known to be in correspondence with chemist Marcellin Berthelot, considered the father of organic synthetic chemistry in France. Pierre-Auguste Renoir’s later paintings relied heavily on alizarin crimson. He also employed cobalt blue or a mixture of ultramarine and cobalt blue, a synthetic pigment. New pigments and dyes were not limited to the artists of Europe, even Japanese printmakers were using dyes like rosaniline as early as 1863.

== Colorants ==
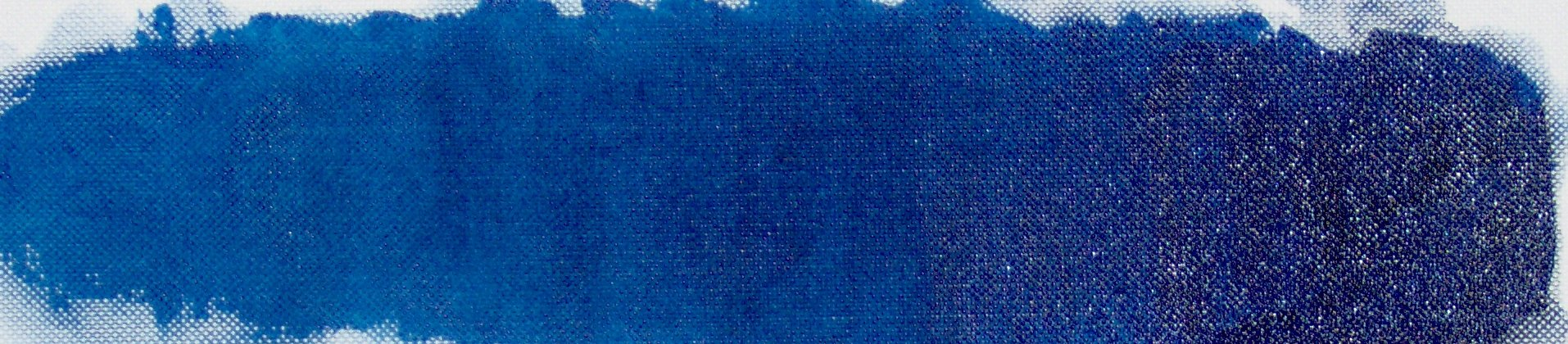
Prussian Blue pigment applied to canvas with oil paint

=== Prussian Blue ===
Prussian Blue, also known as Berlin Blue, Paris Blue, or Turnbull's Blue, is an inorganic pigment, produced in large quantities for both artistic purposes and textiles. It has the chemical formula Fe^{III}_{4}[Fe^{II}(CN)_{6}]_{3}. With a history dating back to the early 18th century, Prussian blue remains a popular artistic pigment. Studies of Prussian Blue lead to discoveries about hydrogen cyanide. It is an antidote for heavy metal poisoning, and is famed for being used to color the uniforms of the Prussian army in the 18th century.

=== Mauveine ===
Mauveine was discovered when Henry Perkin was trying to convert an artificial base into the natural alkaloid quinine. He tried adding aniline – a different base with a simpler construction. This created a black product. After purification, drying and washing with alcohol, Perkin had a mauve dye. Perkin filed his patent in August 1856 and a new dye industry was born. He at first called his discovery Tyrian Purple evoking the value of the ancient, highly expensive, pigment. Other names include aniline purple and Perkin's mauve. Rather than one homogenous molecule, the original mauvine was primarily a mix of four major compounds, mauveine A, mauveine B, mauveine C, and mauveine B2, although there were other mauvine and pseudo mauveines in the dye product.

The structure of alizarin

=== Synthetic alizarin ===
Natural Alizarin was the first colorant to have its structure determined, making it one of the first targets for synthesis. The first synthesis of alizarin was patented by Carl Graebe and Carl Liebermann in 1868. It entailed the dibromination of anthraquinone, followed by fusion with sodium hydroxide. The second, much cheaper, synthetic path was developed in 1869 by Graebe, Liebermann and Heinrich Caro. It entailed the treatment of anthraquinone with fuming sulphuric acid, followed by a treatment with sodium hydroxide and potassium chlorate. Perkin submitted his own patent for a nearly identical process just a day later, and was awarded the patent in England.

== Science ==
Colorants function through selective electromagnetic absorbance in the visible spectrum. A given pigment or dye molecule absorbs different wavelengths of electromagnetic radiation according to its atomic structure and local chemical environment. The quantum behavior of a chemical typically results in distinct resonant frequencies of chemical bonds, which can be excited best by discrete wavelengths—meaning broad spectrum radiation has its spectra changed via absorption upon interaction. The physical shape, size, organization, and concentration of dyes and pigments can also drastically affect observed color. Pigments are particularly susceptible to altered appearances based on physical properties.

Most modern synthetic dye molecules contain two components. The first part is an aromatic benzene ring or system of benzene rings, often substituted. The second is a chromophore, a conjugated double bond system with unsaturated groups. When exposed to visible light, this part absorbs or reflects color. Other components of colorant molecules can tune intensity, color, solubility and substrate affinity.

Dyes and pigments can be categorized according to their synthetic or chemical properties. British chemist Edward Chambers Nicholson showed that pure aniline produced no dye. Hofmann showed that toluidine must be present to make these dyes. Aniline dyes, including mauve, are prepared from aniline-containing amounts of toluidine. One can also classify dyes based on chemical formulas, azo-dyes from coupling, or diazonation—reactions with a characteristic azo group.
