= Reactive Black 5 =

Names
- IUPAC name Tetrasodium 4-amino-5-hydroxy-3,6-bis[[4-(2-sulfonatooxyethylsulfonyl)phenyl]diazenyl]naphthalene-2,7-disulfonate

Identifiers
CAS Number	17095-24-8
3D model (JSmol)	Interactive image
ChEBI	CHEBI:53731
ChEMBL	ChEMBL1326377
ChemSpider	21160530
ECHA InfoCard	100.037.407
EC Number	602-380-9
KEGG	C16001
PubChem CID	135442967
UNII	O0HDY58362
CompTox Dashboard (EPA)	DTXSID4027787
- InChI: InChI=1S/C26H25N5O19S6.4Na/c27-23-22-15(13-20(53(37,38)39)24(23)30-28-16-1-5-18(6-2-16)51(33,34)11-9-49-55(43,44)45)14-21(54(40,41)42)25(26(22)32)31-29-17-3-7-19(8-4-17)52(35,36)12-10-50-56(46,47)48;;;;/h1-8,13-14,32H,9-12,27H2,(H,37,38,39)(H,40,41,42)(H,43,44,45)(H,46,47,48);;;;/q;4*+1/p-4 Key: HFIYIRIMGZMCPC-UHFFFAOYSA-J
- SMILES: C1=CC(=CC=C1N=NC2=C(C3=C(C(=C(C=C3C=C2S(=O)(=O)[O-])S(=O)(=O)[O-])N=NC4=CC=C(C=C4)S(=O)(=O)CCOS(=O)(=O)[O-])N)O)S(=O)(=O)CCOS(=O)(=O)[O-].[Na+].[Na+].[Na+].[Na+]

Properties
Chemical formula	C_{26}H_{21}N_{5}Na_{4}O_{19}S_{6}
Molar mass	991.79 g·mol^{−1}
Density	1.21 g·cm^{−3}
- Except where otherwise noted, data are given for materials in their standard state (at 25 °C [77 °F], 100 kPa). Infobox references

C.I. Reactive Black 5 is a bisazo dye belonging to the reactive dyes application group, used for the reactive dyeing of cotton and wool.

== Preparation ==
Reactive Black 5 (5) is synthesized by the diazotization of parabase ester (1) with sodium nitrite to form the diazo component 2, followed by azo coupling with H-acid (3). First, the two components react at low pH (acid coupling) to form the red monoazo dye (4). Subsequently, at higher pH, the diazo component is coupled adjacent to the hydroxyl group of the H-acid (alkaline coupling):

Depending on the reaction conditions (stoichiometry, concentration), the final product contains proportions of the two isomeric red monoazo dyes in which the azo group is adjacent to either the amino group (4) or the hydroxyl group of H-acid.

== Uses ==
Reactive Black 5 was one of the first vinylsulfone dyes patented by Hoechst AG in 1952 and marketed starting in 1957 under the trade name Remazol Black B. It was the first reactive dye containing two reactive groups within the molecule. Since the two reactive groups are identical, it is referred to as a homo-bifunctional reactive dye.

Reactive Black 5 can be used to achieve shades ranging from navy blue to black on cotton and wool. When combined with red or orange dyes, deep black shades are obtained. Reactive Black 5 is the most widely produced and frequently used reactive dye worldwide.
