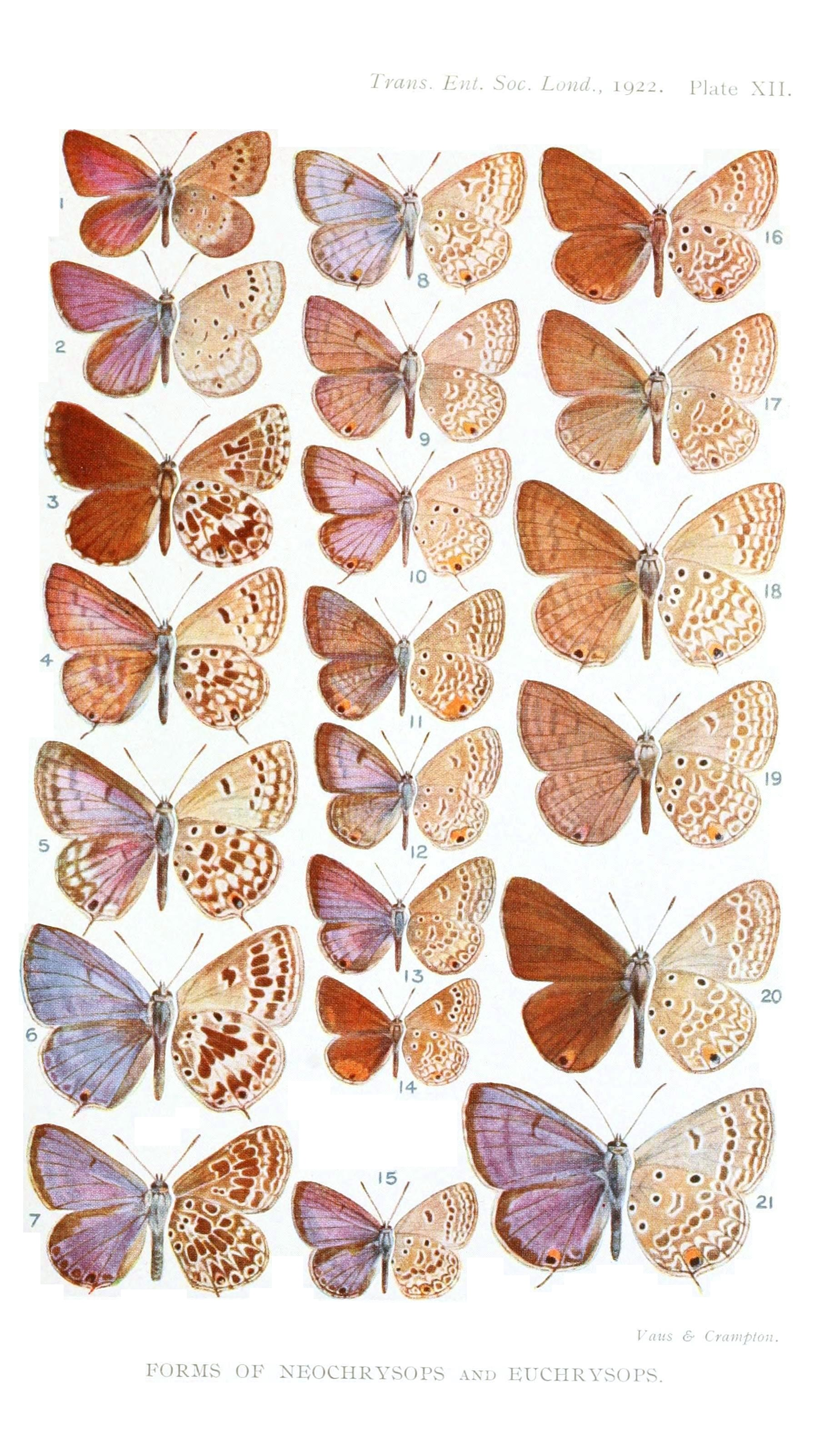
- Figure 6

Conservation status
- Least Concern (IUCN 3.1)

Scientific classification
- Kingdom: Animalia
- Phylum: Arthropoda
- Class: Insecta
- Order: Lepidoptera
- Family: Lycaenidae
- Genus: Lepidochrysops
- Species: L. asteris

Binomial name
- Lepidochrysops asteris (Godart, [1824])

Synonyms
- Polyommatus asteris Godart, [1824]; Neochrysops asteris; Lycaena caffrariae Trimen, 1887; Lepidochrysops caffrariae; Cupido caffrariae; Catochrysops caffrariae; Lycaena celaeus Trimen, 1866

= Lepidochrysops asteris =

Species of butterfly

Lepidochrysops asteris, the star blue or brilliant blue, is a butterfly of the family Lycaenidae. It is found in South Africa, where it is known from the Western Cape, along the Rivieronderendberge and the Rooiberg along the coastal ranges to the Eastern Cape and the KwaZulu-Natal midlands.

The wingspan is 32–40 mm for males and 27–44 mm for females. Adults are on wing from September to November and from February to March in two generations per year from Port Elizabeth northwards. Adults of southern populations are on wing from November to December in one generation.

The larvae feed on Selago species (including Selago serrata), Becium burchellianum and Plectranthus grandidentatus.
