= Mordant Black 9 =

Names
- IUPAC name sodium 3-[(1,5-dihydroxynaphthalen-2-yl)diazenyl]-4-hydroxybenzenesulfonate

Identifiers
CAS Number	2052-25-7
3D model (JSmol)	Interactive image
ChemSpider	15447487
ECHA InfoCard	100.016.496
EC Number	218-145-5
PubChem CID	135580622
CompTox Dashboard (EPA)	DTXSID3062154
- InChI: InChI=1S/C16H12N2O6S.Na/c19-14-3-1-2-11-10(14)5-6-12(16(11)21)17-18-13-8-9(25(22,23)24)4-7-15(13)20;/h1-8,19-21H,(H,22,23,24);/q;+1/p-1 Key: AHKONVJORNYTAC-UHFFFAOYSA-M
- SMILES: C1=CC2=C(C=CC(=C2O)N=NC3=C(C=CC(=C3)S(=O)(=O)[O-])O)C(=C1)O.[Na+]

Properties
Chemical formula	C_{16}H_{11}N_{2}NaO_{6}S
Molar mass	382.32 g·mol^{−1}
Appearance	black
Density	1.541 g·cm^{−3}
Solubility in water	48 g/L
- Except where otherwise noted, data are given for materials in their standard state (at 25 °C [77 °F], 100 kPa). Infobox references

C.I. Mordant Black 9 is a monoazo dye belonging to the class of mordant dyes, used, among other applications, in the textile industry for dyeing wool and leather.

== Synthesis ==
Mordant Black 9 is obtained by reacting 1,5-dihydroxynaphthalene as a coupling component with diazotized 3-amino-4-hydroxybenzenesulfonic acid. The dye was patented in 1902 by Dye Works formerly Friedr. Bayer & Co AG in Elberfeld.

== Properties ==
Mordant Black 9 is a chromium dye. During the dyeing process, sparingly soluble chromium complexes are formed on the fiber with chromium salts, which are characterized by high colorfastness.
