= Disperse Yellow 42 =

Chemical compound

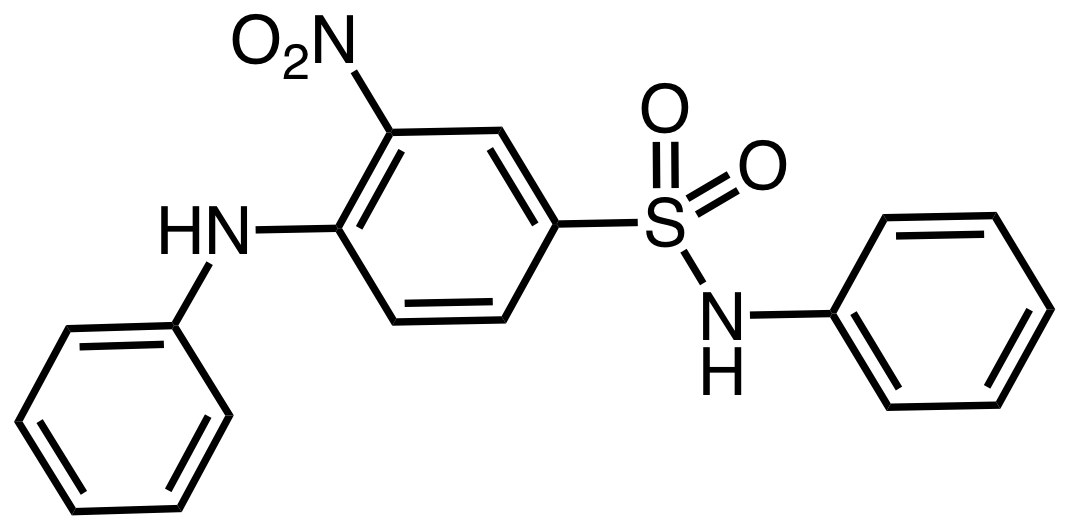

Names
- Preferred IUPAC name 4-Anilino-3-nitro-N-phenylbenzene-1-sulfonamide
- Other names 4-Anilino-3-nitrobenzenesulfonanilide; C.I. 10338 (Colour index numbers)

Identifiers
CAS Number	5124-25-4
3D model (JSmol)	Interactive image
ChEMBL	ChEMBL1708990
ChemSpider	19933
ECHA InfoCard	100.023.511
EC Number	225-862-7
PubChem CID	21201
UNII	XFL4U655CN
CompTox Dashboard (EPA)	DTXSID8052148
- InChI: InChI=1S/C18H15N3O4S/c22-21(23)18-13-16(26(24,25)20-15-9-5-2-6-10-15)11-12-17(18)19-14-7-3-1-4-8-14/h1-13,19-20H Key: BBFRYSKTTHYWQZ-UHFFFAOYSA-N
- SMILES: C1=CC=C(C=C1)NC2=C(C=C(C=C2)S(=O)(=O)NC3=CC=CC=C3)[N+](=O)[O-]

Properties
Chemical formula	C_{18}H_{15}N_{3}O_{4}S
Molar mass	369.40 g·mol^{−1}
Melting point	156 °C (313 °F; 429 K)

Hazards
- GHS labelling
Pictograms	(GHS07: Exclamation mark) (GHS09: Environmental hazard)
Signal word	Warning
Hazard statements	H317, H411, H412
Precautionary statements	P261, P272, P273, P280, P302+P352, P321, P333+P313, P363, P391, P501
- Except where otherwise noted, data are given for materials in their standard state (at 25 °C [77 °F], 100 kPa). Infobox references

Disperse Yellow 42, or 4-anilino-3-nitrobenzenesulfonanilide, is a disperse dye that is primarily used to dye polyester fibers. It is prepared by the reaction of two equivalents of aniline with 4-chloro-3-nitrobenzenesulfonyl chloride. An estimated 10,000 tons were prepared in 1990, making Disperse Yellow 42 the nitro dye produced on the largest scale.
