= Carbonyl dyes =

Carbonyl dyes are dyes which comprise at least two conjugated carbonyl groups. Both anthraquinone dyes and indigo dyes belong to the group of carbonyl dyes. The most important natural dyes - indigo, Tyrian purple, alizarin and carmine - have this partial structure. The most important synthetic carbonyl dyes are based on anthraquinone.

The main advantages of carbonyl dyes are the possibility of reducing the carbonyl groups to water-soluble dienols (→Vat dyes), which is advantageous in industrial applications. On the other hand, by introducing suitable electron donating groups, the absorption maximum of the resulting dyes can be shifted to almost any region of the VIS spectrum.

Reduction/Oxidation of carbonyl dyestuffs / examples: anthraquinone and indigo
