= Remazol Brilliant Blue R =

Names
- Preferred IUPAC name Disodium 1-amino-9,10-dioxo-4-{3-[2-(sulfonatooxy)ethane-1-sulfonyl]anilino}-9,10-dihydroanthracene-2-sulfonate
- Other names: Reactive Blue 19; Remazol Blue R (Special)

Identifiers
CAS Number	2580-78-1
3D model (JSmol)	Interactive image
ChemSpider	16472
ECHA InfoCard	100.018.137
EC Number	219-949-9
PubChem CID	17409
UNII	L51IMM9UP9
CompTox Dashboard (EPA)	DTXSID5025992
- InChI: InChI=1S/C22H18N2O11S3.2Na/c23-20-17(37(29,30)31)11-16(18-19(20)22(26)15-7-2-1-6-14(15)21(18)25)24-12-4-3-5-13(10-12)36(27,28)9-8-35-38(32,33)34;;/h1-7,10-11,24H,8-9,23H2,(H,29,30,31)(H,32,33,34);;/q;2*+1/p-2 Key: KUIXZSYWBHSYCN-UHFFFAOYSA-L
- SMILES: C1=CC=C2C(=C1)C(=O)C3=C(C2=O)C(=C(C=C3NC4=CC(=CC=C4)S(=O)(=O)CCOS(=O)(=O)[O-])S(=O)(=O)[O-])N.[Na+].[Na+]

Properties
Chemical formula	C_{22}H_{16}N_{2}Na_{2}O_{11}S_{3}
Molar mass	626.53 g·mol^{−1}
- Except where otherwise noted, data are given for materials in their standard state (at 25 °C [77 °F], 100 kPa). Infobox references

Remazol Brilliant Blue R (RBBR) is an anthraquinone dye used in textile industries. It does not decay quickly in wastewater; recent studies have suggested a biological approach to solving this problem through the use of microorganisms to degrade the dye.
