= Indanthrone blue =

Organic dye made from 2-aminoanthraquinone

- Skeletal formula

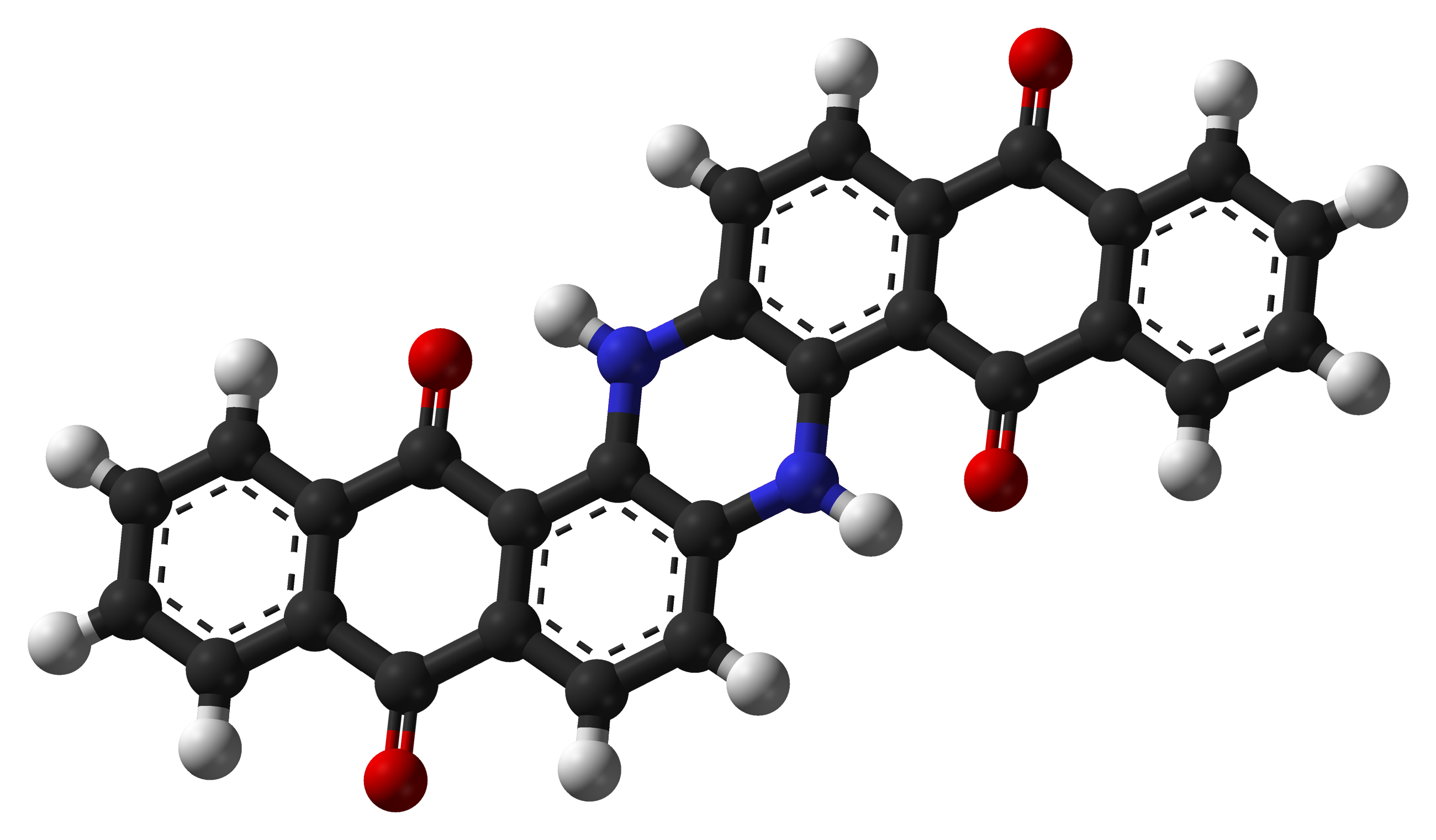
- Ball-and-stick model

Names
- Preferred IUPAC name 6,15-Dihydrodinaphtho[2,3-a:2′,3′-h]phenazine-5,9,14,18-tetrone
- Other names C.I. vat blue 4, carbon paper blue, blue O, carbanthrene blue 2R, fenan blue RSN, graphtol blue RL, medium blue, monolite fast blue 3R, indanthrene, indanthrone, pigment blue 60, C.I. 69800

Identifiers
CAS Number	81-77-6
3D model (JSmol)	Interactive image
Beilstein Reference	367131
ChemSpider	6435
ECHA InfoCard	100.001.251
E number	E130 (colours)
PubChem CID	6690
UNII	R68OT0N83K
CompTox Dashboard (EPA)	DTXSID2026280
- InChI: InChI=1S/C28H14N2O4/c31-25-13-5-1-3-7-15(13)27(33)21-17(25)9-11-19-23(21)29-20-12-10-18-22(24(20)30-19)28(34)16-8-4-2-6-14(16)26(18)32/h1-12,29-30H Key: UHOKSCJSTAHBSO-UHFFFAOYSA-N; InChI=1/C28H14N2O4/c31-25-13-5-1-3-7-15(13)27(33)21-17(25)9-11-19-23(21)29-20-12-10-18-22(24(20)30-19)28(34)16-8-4-2-6-14(16)26(18)32/h1-12,29-30H Key: UHOKSCJSTAHBSO-UHFFFAOYAY
- SMILES: O=C6c5c4Nc3c(c2C(=O)c1ccccc1C(=O)c2cc3)Nc4ccc5C(=O)c7ccccc67

Properties
Chemical formula	C_{28}H_{14}N_{2}O_{4}
Molar mass	442.430 g·mol^{−1}
Appearance	dark blue solid
Density	1.6 g/ml
Melting point	470-500 °C (decomposes)
Solubility in water	Insoluble
- Except where otherwise noted, data are given for materials in their standard state (at 25 °C [77 °F], 100 kPa). verify (what is ?) Infobox references

Indanthrone blue, also called indanthrene, is an organic compound with the formula (C_{14}H_{6}O_{2}NH)_{2}. It is a dark blue solid that is a common dye as well as a precursor to other dyes. It was assigned E number E130 in Europe as a food colouring, but has been banned since 1978. It is not approved in the United states as a food additive.

== Preparation and structure ==
Of significance in the history of synthetic colourants, the compound was prepared in an era when anthraquinone dyes were being first investigated. The theme was inspired by the structure recently proposed for alizarin, a popular natural dye. Indanthrone was first made by R. Bohn at BASF in 1901. He fused (melted) a mixture of 2-aminoanthraquinone and potassium hydroxide in air at 250 °C. Subsequent work led to the discovery of the related flavanthrene dyes, including Vat Yellow 1.

synthesis of indanthrone

Procedure for producing indanthrone from 2-aminoanthraquinone.

Owing to intermolecular hydrogen bonding, indanthrone is insoluble. It can be modified by installing tert-butyloxycarbonyl groups in place of the N-H groups to give an organic-soluble "latent pigment." Processing of such derivatives has affording crystals of the parent pigment.

== Applications ==
Indanthrone is utilized as a blue pigment (C.I. Pigment Blue 60), primarily in the process of vat dyeing, often referred to as C.I. Vat Blue 4. Indanthrone is a vat dye, synthesized to provide highest color fastness for the dyeing and printing of predominantly cellulose-based textile fibers. Fabrics dyed with indanthrene fulfill the highest standards and exhibit exceptional wash fastness, boil fastness, light fastness, weather fastness and chlorine fastness.

It is a pigment that can be used in the following media: acrylic, alkyd, casein, encaustic, fresco, gouache, linseed oil, tempera, pastel, and watercolor painting. It is used to dye unmordanted cotton and as a pigment in quality paints and enamels. As a food dye, it has number 130, but it is not approved for use in either the United States or the European Union. It has excellent light fastness, but may bleed in some organic solvents.

Indanthrone blue was the first example of the brand "Indanthren" (an acronym for Indigo from anthracene) introduced by BASF in 1901. One result is that even now, in Japan vat dyes are commonly described as threne dyes (スレン染料), derived from the Japanese transliteration of the brand.

== Significance of Indigo Pure BASF in Indanthrene Blue ==
The color and vat dye that came before Indanthrene Blue was Indigo Pure BASF. This synthesis consisted of Phenylglycocoll acid mixed and fused with Caustic soda which transforms into an alkaline solution. When this Alkaline solution makes contact with oxygen, the color Indigo precipitates/appears. This process would be replicated in various ways to create Indanthrene blue and its derivatives. Indigo Pure BASF contributed to the research as a cornerstone of its progress as the chemists at BASF took 17 years to research and synthesize this vat dye.

== Other studies ==
As an organic semiconductor, indanthrone has been considered as a photocatalyst for oxygen generation from water utilizing solar energy. Indanthrone's characteristic as a nonlinear optics light absorber, allows for its use as an optical limiter, which can be employed, for instance, in laser protective filters.

== Related compounds ==
Indrathren Blue CLB (PubChem CID 5483458, registry number 6492-78-0) is a related blue dye.
