= M18 smoke grenade =

American signalling device

M18
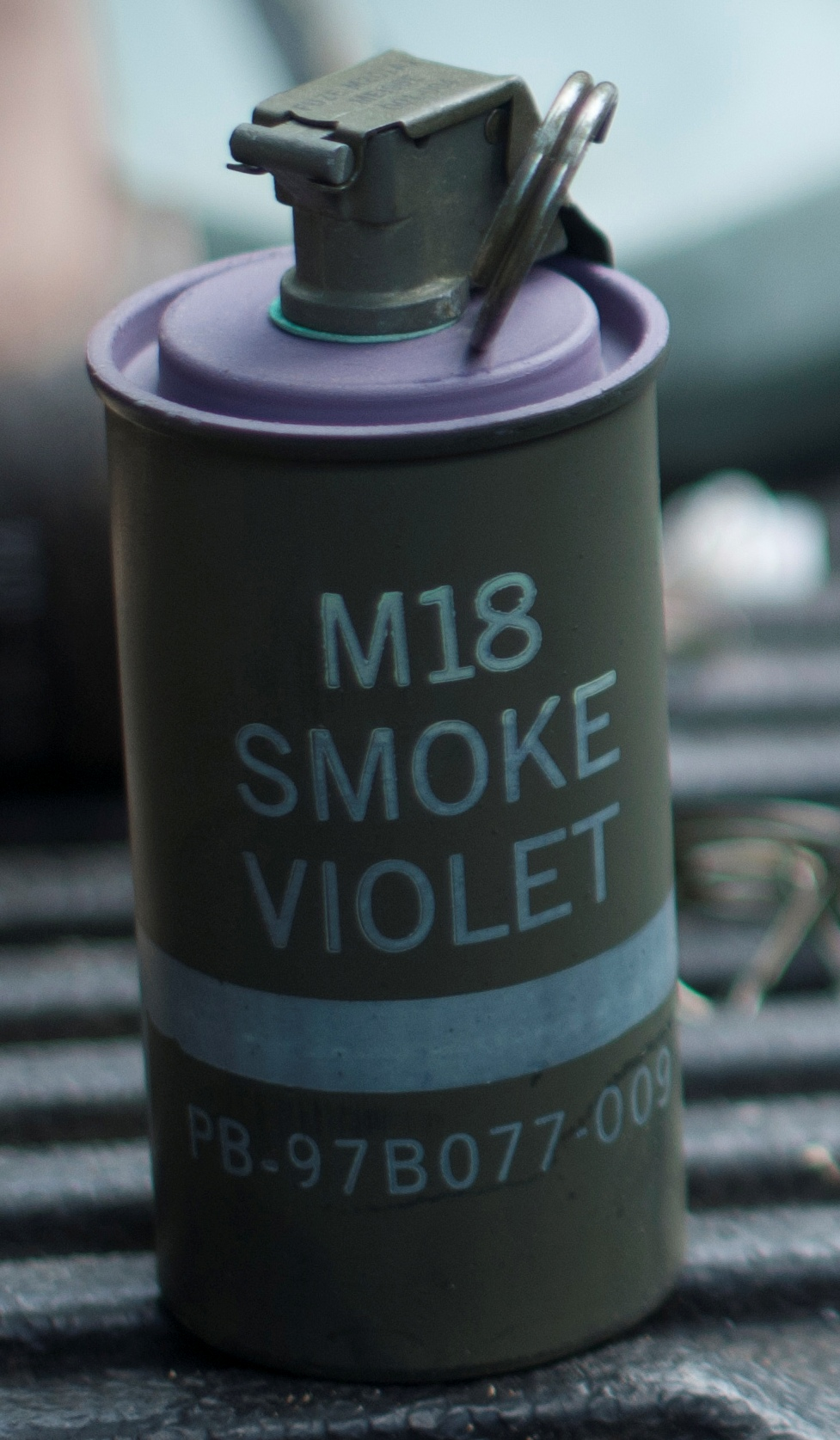
- M18 Colored Smoke Grenade with "violet" or purple smoke filling
- Type: Smoke grenade
- Place of origin: United States

Service history
- In service: 24 September 1943-present
- Used by: United States; Australia; Iraq; New Zealand; South Vietnam; Ukraine
- Wars: World War II; Korean War; Vietnam War; War in Afghanistan (2001–2021); Iraq War; Russo-Ukrainian War

Production history
- Designed: 1943
- Manufacturer: Pine Bluff Arsenal
- Developed from: M16 Colored Smoke Grenade
- Unit cost: $109.02 (avg. cost in 2025)
- Produced: 1943-present
- No. built: 3,800,000+
- Variants: G940 (Green); G945 (Yellow); G950 (Red); G955 (Violet)

Specifications
- Mass: 19 oz (540 g)
- Length: 5.75 in (146 mm)
- Diameter: 2.50 in (64 mm)
- Filling weight: 11.4 oz (320 g)
- Detonation mechanism: Pyrotechnic M201A1 Pull-ring delay Igniter (1.0–2.3 seconds)

The M18 Colored Smoke Grenade is the standard issue colored smoke grenade of the United States Armed Forces and is produced by the Pine Bluff Arsenal. Development began in 1942 after the Army Ground Forces requested a smoke hand grenade be made that had a visible range of 10,000 feet and could be used for marking friendly troop positions, identifying American tanks, or to signal location of downed planes. Utilizing previous experience in colored smoke signals, the Chemical Corps took on this task and had the first colored smoke grenades available in April 1943 designated as "M16".

After production of the M16 colored smoke grenades were underway, the Army Ground Forces decided they did not produce sufficient smoke. The M16 grenades were then redesigned, with the improved version being designated "M18". These grenades became standard issue on 24 September 1943, serving as the primary colored smoke grenades for the United States Armed Forces since. The M18 was first used in combat towards the end of World War II after supplies of the M16 grenades were expended.

Despite advancements in other methods used, colored smoke grenades such as the M18 are still regarded as a highly valuable communication method during military operations. They are primarily used for ground-to-ground or ground-to-air signaling, and target or landing zone marking.

== Development History ==
=== Background ===
Prior to the creation of smoke grenades, basic colored smoke signals and flares were used by the United States Armed Forces (USAF). During World War I, American Expeditionary Forces (AEF) operated in sectors held by the French Army. They used French and British equipment supplied to them, and observed that the French used red and yellow colored smoke signals. These smoke signals were used in a variety of formats such as on rockets with parachutes, rifle grenades, and in various calibers of pistol cartridges. After observing this, it was seen as beneficial to adopt the French Army system of pyrotechnics into the AEF in 1918. In the prior year, the Chemical Corps developed colored smoke signals for the AEF that came in colors of red, yellow, blue, green, and black. However, only yellow was produced at the time as dyes for the other colors were not available in the United States.

After World War I, the research and development of various colored smoke munitions for the USAF increased. Colored smoke would eventually be available in bombs, mortars, canisters for various calibers of projectiles, and hand and rifle grenades.

=== Creation ===
In 1942, the Army Ground Forces requested a smoke hand grenade be made that had a visible range of 10,000 feet to be used for marking friendly troop positions, identifying American tanks, or to signal location of downed planes. Utilizing previous experience in colored smoke signals while cooperating with the Ordnance Department, the Chemical Corps took on this task. Development of colored smoke hand grenades began in September of that year.

The initial problem that had to be figured out for creating the grenades was finding a mixture of chemicals that could produce smoke of desired color, volume, visibility, and duration while being heat-stable, commercially available, and inexpensive. Additionally the fuel used had to burn with sufficient intensity to volatilize but not destroy the dyes.

First models of the smoke grenades were based on the M7 tear gas grenade, utilizing its tube and fuse assembly. This was a 2 3/8-inches wide and 4 5/8-inches tall steel cylindrical tube with 3 lines of 6 emission holes going around the body. On top were 4 additional emission holes, and a threaded hole in the center that a M200A1 fuse went into. The fuel mixture chosen consisted of sulfur and potassium chlorate. Sodium bicarbonate was used as a coolant to absorb heat, helping the dye mixture burn longer while preventing it from decomposing. Organic dye mixtures that varied in composition based on color were pressed into the tube before the fuel mixture was added.

Finding the right dyes took time, with hundreds tested at the Edgewood Arsenal and various other agencies. Many were discarded due to not meeting visibility and color requirements, or for being in short supply at the time. Rather than the dyes being synthesized by Edgewood Arsenal Laboratories, they were obtained from various industries because of the variety and quantity required. Development was finished once all colors could be distinguished from 10,000 feet. These grenades produced smoke for 2 to 2 1/2 minutes. They came in colors of red, orange, yellow, green, violet, and black and were designated as "M16" in April 1943, becoming standard issue and entering full production in May.

Shortly after the production of the M16 began, the Army Ground Forces tested its performance and decided they wanted a more rapidly burning smoke grenade with a denser smoke cloud. This was not possible with the current composition of fuel and dye mixtures and would result in the dyes burning rather than volatilizing. Proportions of ingredients in the mixtures were adjusted, along with the pressure at which they were compressed during production. The rows of holes around the tube the mixtures went into were removed, and a 1 1/2-inch hole was cut through the middle on the bottom.

The new grenades produced the desired denser, more vibrant colored smoke cloud, and had a shorter burning time of about 1 to 1 1/2 minutes. They were designated as "M18" on 24 September 1943, entering full production and replacing the M16 which was then marked limited standard and stopped being produced.

Originally they were to come in the same colors as the M16, including white. During later testing it was decided that orange and yellow along with blue and violet were too similar for aircraft to differentiate from altitudes of 10,000 feet. Black and white were discarded because being able to identify them from other battle-field related smoke would be difficult. This left the M18 being produced in 4 colors instead which was red, yellow, green, and violet.

=== Subsequent Design Changes ===
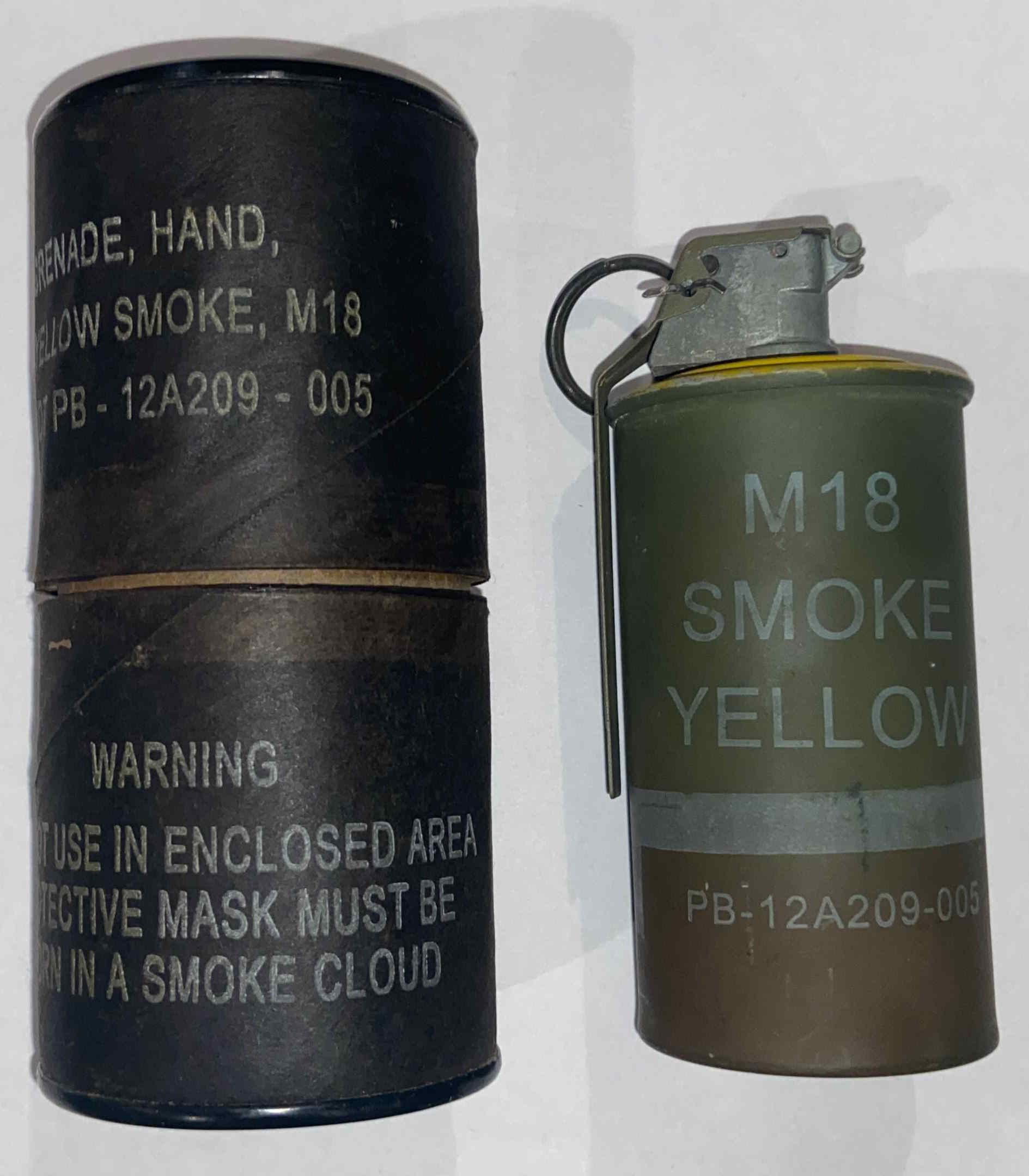
Yellow M18 from January 2012 with shipping tube.

In the 1950s the tube for the M18 was 2 1/2-inches wide and 4 1/2-inches tall. There were 6 emission holes on the top and an additional on the bottom covered by tape for smoke to release when ignited. On the top a M201A1 pull-ring fuse assembly was threaded into the middle, and the top was painted indicating the color of smoke inside. A yellow band and text painted on the body stated the color, lot number, and date produced following MIL-STD-1168 format.

In the 1960s the M18 tube sized was changed to 2 1/2-inches wide and 5 3/4-inches tall. There were 4 emission holes on the top instead of 6, but the one on the bottom remained. The top was painted indicating the color, while the body came in gray or olive drab. A yellow or gray band and text were painted on the body. A waxed cardboard tube was used for shipping protection instead of metal.

In 2005, the top 4 emission holes were removed leaving only the bottom one. Inside the tube starter patches were put between pucks of dye during the manufacturing process to improve burning time and performance. The design was otherwise the same as the previous iteration.

==== Chemistry Changes ====
The smoke from an M18 is produced by volatilizing and condensing a colored dye mixture. The heat produced by the starter mixture volatilizes the dye which is then condensed by the air forming a colored smoke cloud. A cooling agent is added to the smoke mixture to help prevent excessive decomposition of the dye while burning time can be regulated by adjusting the amount of oxidant and combustible materials.

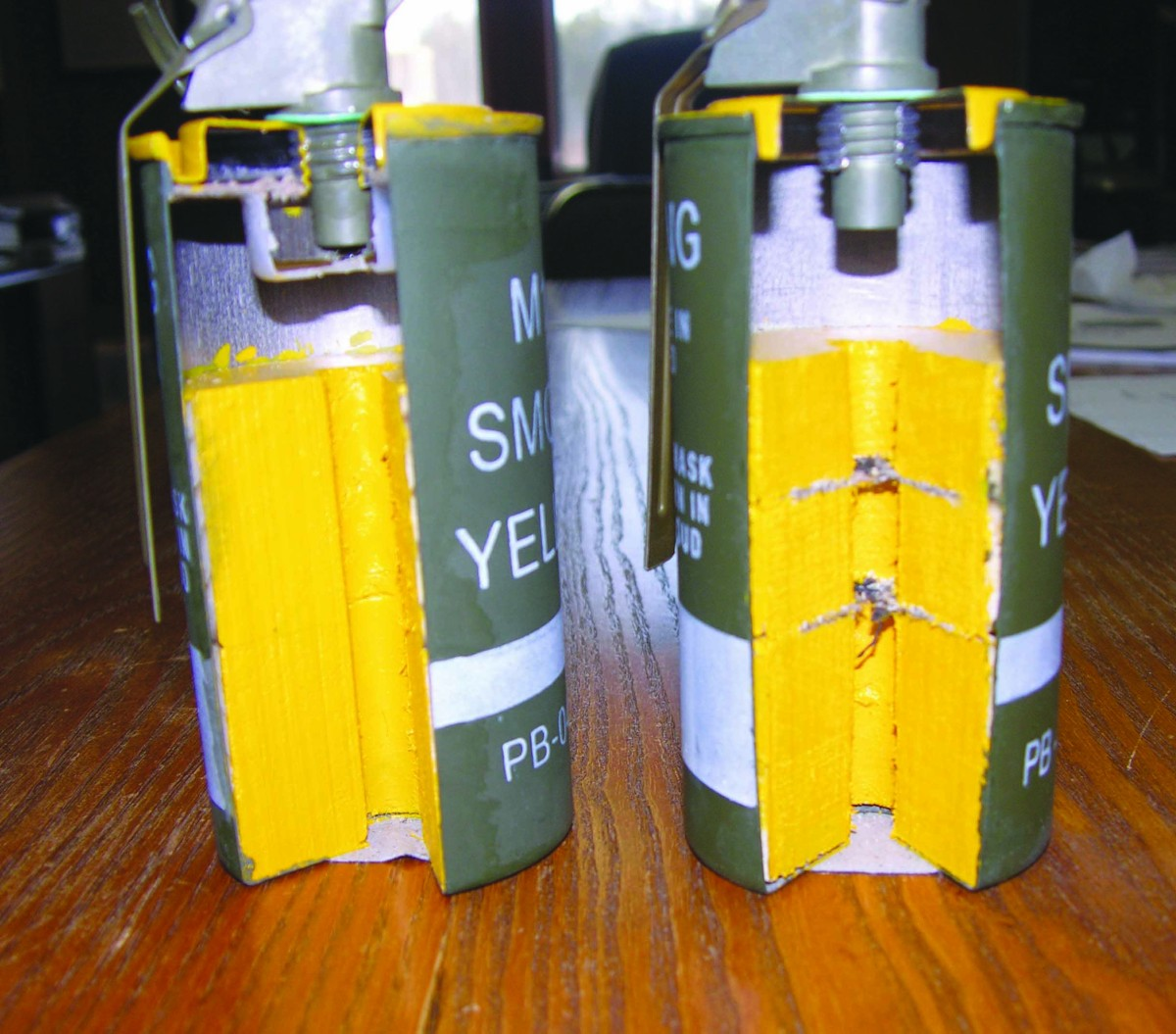
Two yellow M18's cut open, the one on the right has starter patches put between pucks of dye.

During extensive testing with the M18 in the 1980s, it was found that the burning of the original chemical components (Sulfur, potassium chlorate, and sodium bicarbonate) resulted in a toxic smoke mixture so the formulas were remade.

The new formulas used sugar for the starter mixture and magnesium carbonate as coolant. The dye mixtures were also changed, using different coloring components. The formula for the green and yellow M18 were changed quickly with relative ease, while red and violet were more challenging to produce. The sugar-based smoke compositions burned slightly hotter than the sulfur based ones, resulting in the dyes for red and violet burning instead of volatilizing. Additionally, it was also found the new violet smoke color mixture using Disperse Blue 3 even more toxic than the original. This was later changed to Disperse Red 11.

Due to the burning issues, red and violet M18's kept being produced using the original formulas until the early 2000s. They were then looked at again by the U.S. Army Environment Command and Environmental Security Technology Certification Program (ESTCP). They introduced wafer starter patches placed between dye pucks, which reduced the overall temperature during burning preventing the dyes from decomposing. The new red was found to produce a pinkish smoke rather than the intended darker red, caused by added Terephthalic Acid. Several attempts were made to correct it but were unsuccessful.

The new dye mixtures are produced by Nation Ford Chemical in South Carolina.

===== Old/New Mixture Comparison Table =====
Component	Green		Yellow		Red		Violet	
	Old	New	Old	New	Old	New	Old	New
Vat Yellow 4	4.0%		14.0%					
Solvent Yellow 33		12.6%		42.0%				
Disperse Red 9					40.0%		8.4%	
Solvent Red 1						34.2%		
Disperse Red 11						6.8%		38.0%
Solvent Green 3	28.0%	29.4%						
Benzanthrone	8.0%		24.5%					
1,4-Diamino-2,3-dihydroanthraquinone							33.6%	
Sulfur	10.4%		8.5%		9.0%		9.0%	
Sodium Bicarbonate	22.6%		33.0%		25.0%		24.0%	5.1%
Potassium Chlorate	27.0%	25.0%	20.0%	24.1%	26.0%	17.7%	25.0%	23.5%
Magnesium Carbonate		15.5%		17.5%		9.6%		10.2%
Terephthalic Acid						14.0%		7.6%
Sugar		17.5%		16.4%		17.7%		15.5%
Stearic Acid						0.5%		0.5%
Table Sources:

=== Non-submersible Variant ===
In 1971, a non-submersible version of the M18 was created by Northrup Carolina, a subsidiary of Northrup Grumman at the time. This version was the same physical dimensions as the standard M18 and looked almost identical on the outside. The body contained a chimney design vent hole under the fuse assembly in the middle. Surrounding the chimney was a folded silicone fiberglass ballute that was attached to a bulkhead plate. 8 vent holes on the top of the bulkhead were used to inflate the ballute when the grenade was ignited. Below the bulkhead was a starter/ignition mixture, inflation mixture, and smoke mixture.

When ignited and thrown, the top of the grenade with the fuse assembly detached while the ballute inflated. The grenade would then glide towards the ground upright, and could float in water. During testing it was found these versions of the M18 had a lower smoke volume but burning time was almost double of the standard M18 with 90 seconds minimum. Although testing was considered successful, this version of the M18 was not used outside of it. It was created as the standard M18 was found to provide poor visibility for signaling when used in areas partially or fully covered in water in Vietnam.

=== Manufacturing ===
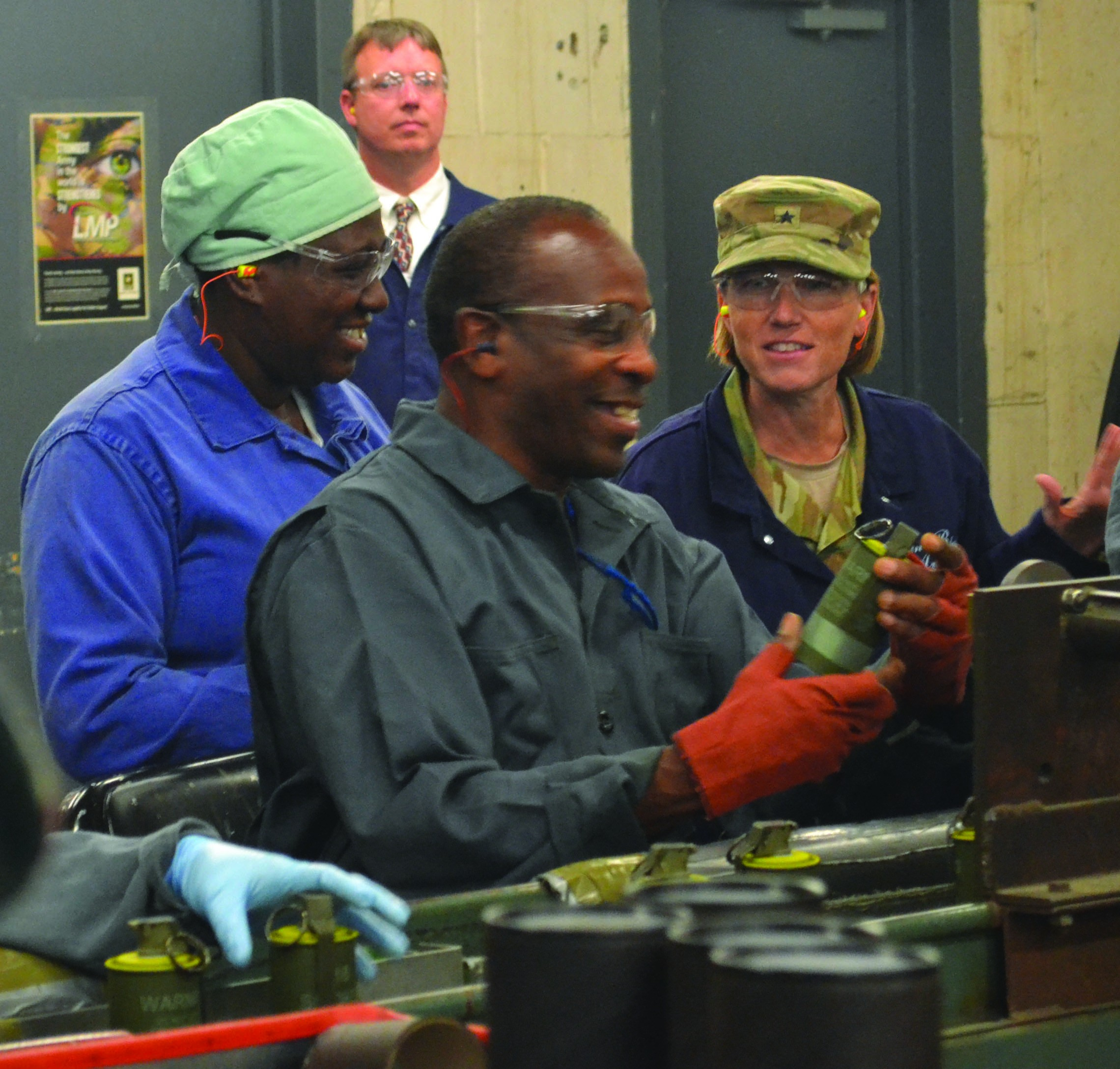
General Brig. Gen. Michelle Letcher chatting with Pine Bluff Arsenal M18 production workers, September 16, 2019.

The Pine Bluff Arsenal in Arkansas is the only manufacturer of the M18 today. It has been assembled there since its introduction in 1942. Majority of M18's were produced by Pine Bluff. This is denoted on an M18 by a "PB" or "PBA" before the lot number marked on the outside. The various components of the M18 are made by different manufacturers contracted yearly in the United States. As of 2024 the body and lid are made by Tool Masters, Inc. in Tuscumbia, Alabama. The fuze assembly is made by Day & Zimmermann in Texarkana, Texas. The smoke mixture dyes are produced by Nation Ford Chemical in South Carolina.

Over the course of the M18's usage, various manufacturers have been used alongside the Pine Bluff Arsenal. Ordnance Products, Inc. ("OPI") from Maryland, Martin Electronics, Inc. ("MEI") from Florida, and Talley Industries, Inc. ("TAC") from Arizona are some examples.

==== Yearly Procurement Costs Table ====
Year	Green	Yellow	Red	Violet
2025	$104.53	$106.03	$113.10	$112.42
2024	$101.83	$103.39	$115.44	$114.87
2023	$118.75	$118.75	x	$120.15
2022	$110.57	$117.97	x	x
2021	x	x	$88.04	$154.68
2020	$90.53	$91.72	x	$99.68
2019	$81.21	$82.30	x	$90.38
2018	$68.24	$71.67	x	$74.02
2017	$64.84	$68.22	x	$70.79
2016	$57.45	$60.81	x	$63.34
2015	$49.89	$53.05	$56.06	$55.25
2014	$44.93	$47.82	$50.25	$49.71
2013	$60.26	$61.80	$122.80	$74.68
2012	$54.73	$57.73	x	$70.54
2011	x	x	x	x
2010	$59	x	x	x
2009	$49	$64	$62	$59
2008	$41	$62	$67	$61
2007	$55	$52	$55	$56
2006	$54	$51	$54	$53
2005	$45	$39.89	$53	$58
2004	x	x	x	x
2003	$32.00	$30.06	$29.10	$27.73
2002	x	x	x	x
2001	$27.05	$26.61	x	x
2000	x	$27.13	x	x
1999	$47.30	$33.27	x	$37.61
1998	x	$31.89	x	$31.90
1997	#	#	#	#
x - Grenades not procured during this time period, so cost isn't available. # - Information on procurement costs is not available in sources used prior to 1998. Table Sources: Army Financial Management & Comptroller, Procurement of Ammunition, Army

== Operation ==
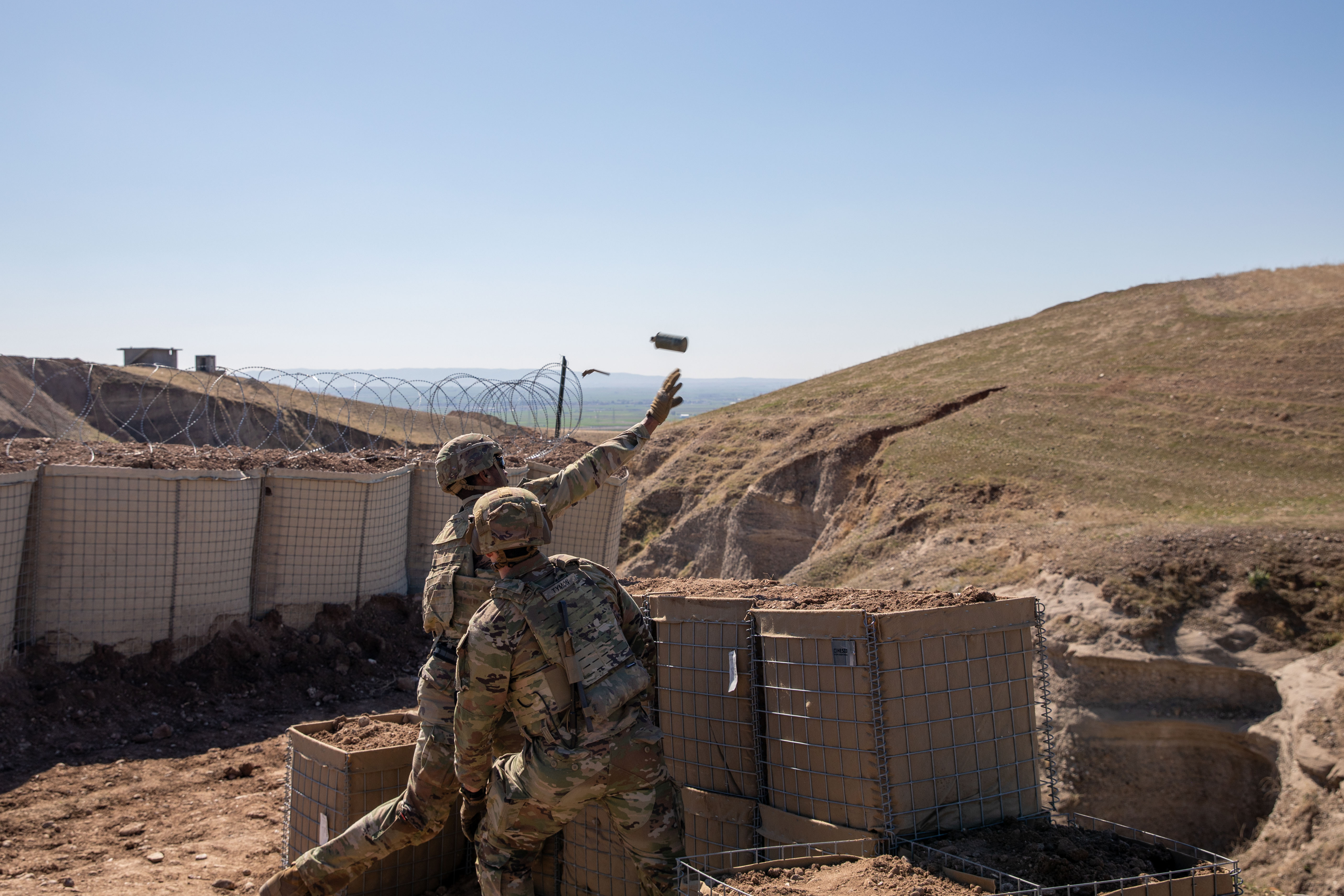
U.S. Army infantryman throws an M18 smoke grenade during training exercise in northern Iraq, Feb. 22, 2025.

=== Throwing ===
The M18 is used by holding it in one hand with the safety lever pressed against the canister. The safety pin/ring is then removed after which the M18 can be thrown. As the safety lever is released, it is forced away from the body by a striker spring. The striker rotates on its own and strikes the percussion primer. The fuze delay then starts the ignition process. The tape covering the bottom emission hole is blown off and smoke is released. After ignition, the M18 produced a cloud of colored smoke for 50 to 90 seconds. The M18 could be thrown up to 35 meters by the average soldier.

If the fuze was non-functional, the M18 could still be used. This was done by removing the tape covering the hole on the bottom, removing the fuze assembly, and igniting the starter mixture with an open flame.

With the M18 there is a danger of starting a fire if it is used in a dry foliage area as the inside of the tube gets very hot during the burning process (upwards of 350 °C). Expended smoke grenade canisters remain hot for some time after burning out and should not be picked up bare-handed.

=== Launcher Attachments ===
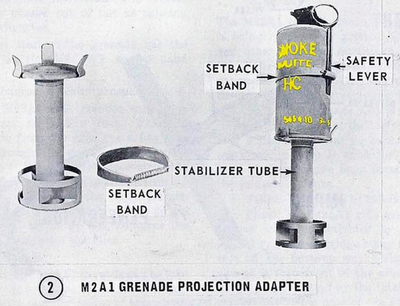
Diagram of the M2A1 adapter with the AN-M8 smoke grenade.

The M18 was able to be used as a rifle launched grenade using the M2/M2A1 (originally designated T2E1) chemical grenade projection attachment. This attachment was mounted onto a M7A3 or M76 grenade launcher, which went onto a rifle or carbine such as the M1 and M14. It was a modified version of the M1 grenade adapter and was created around 1944.

The M2 adapter consisted of a stabilizer assembly which was a metal tube with a fin assembly on one end and a base plate with a set of three claws on the other. The grenade was installed by being forced down into the clips until held securely in place. A setback band, which was a metal band with the ends held together by a spring, was installed midway on the grenade with the spring over the safety lever to hold it against the canister. The M2A1 was a revised design with a slotted fin assembly and reinforced base plate which gave it more stability.

To use the launcher, the stabilizer tube was installed over the grenade launcher at a position that would give a desired range. The grenade/adapter was rotated so that the safety lever faced the ground, and the safety pin was removed. The assembly was launched by firing a high-powered blank from the rifle. When fired a forceful shock causes the setback band to slide down the grenade, releasing the lever. After launching the assembly would remain attached to the grenade until it landed. Using the M2/M2A1 adapter allowed higher ranges up to about 180 meters.

The M2/M2A1 launchers were not widely used for the M18, which were intended more for chemical grenades such as the M6/M7 tear gas grenades. The impact of hitting the ground using the adapter could cause the M18 to burn out prematurely. There were rifle launched smoke grenades such as the M22 series available in the same colors that were designed specifically for this purpose.

A modified version of the M2A1 designated T1 was made for suspending M18 smoke grenades from trees to increase visibility. Instead of a setback band it used a solid ring to hold the grenade safety lever. A cardboard tube that contained rayon cord was tied to the base of the M2A1 and another ring positioned towards the top of the grenade. When the rifle was fired the entire assembly was launched, with the setback ring sliding down and striking the clips holding the grenade. This would release them, separating the grenade and adapter assembly. As the grenade flew, the cord would unravel from the tube which could easily be entangled in trees and allow the grenade to be suspended.

== Operational History ==
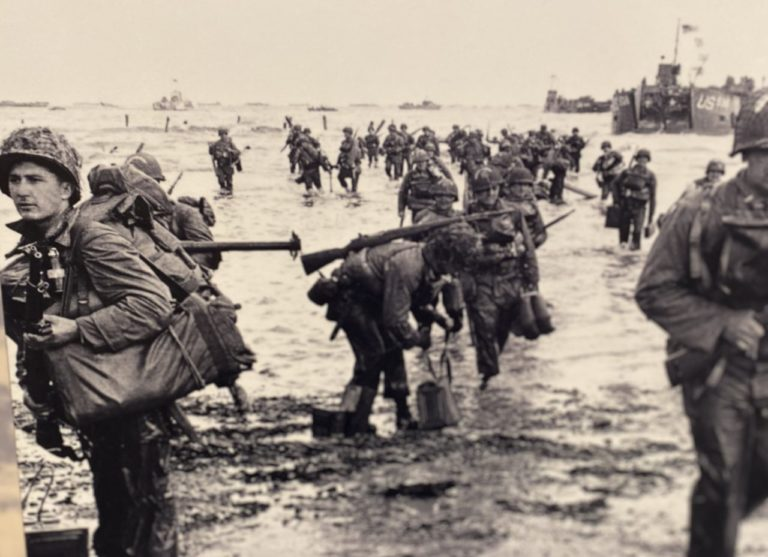
U.S. Army soldier with an M16 attached to harness (left), Omaha beach near Vierville sur Mer, France, June 6, 1944.

=== World War II ===
The M16 was first used in combat before testing was completed and it being adopted as a standard munition in November 1942 with Operation Torch. General George S. Patton heard about the development of the smoke grenades and sent officers to the Edgewood Arsenal to observe testing. The observers decided yellow had the best visibility, and had several thousand yellow grenades produced before troops arrived in French Morocco.

A large stock of M16's were made before the M18 replaced it and were used first in the war. On 6 June 1944, for the Normandy landings the color orange was chosen for identifying friendly positions, and so orange M16's were distributed, primarily to paratrooper units such as the 502nd and 505th Parachute Infantry Regiments.

Over the course of the war, troops and armored units utilized smoke grenades greatly. Commanders prearranged attack plans with color codes so that units could easily coordinate with each other. The grenades were used for marking allied positions to try to prevent friendly fire, while rifle-launching adapters allowed marking enemies a distance away. The great visibility of the smoke helped artillery observers and friendly aircraft above see these positions from afar.

By late 1945 the M16 was phased out with supplies diminished, and the M18 took over.

=== Korean War ===
Introduction of a helicopter based medical evacuation system in the Korean War and supply shortages had the M18 considered a more vital piece of equipment for troops. The M18 was primarily used to mark landing zones, making finding friendly troops on the ground to evacuate wounded personnel easier for the pilots regardless of the terrain. However, there was a shortage of the grenades among other U.S. army ammunition and equipment during the war due to a logistic support deficiency. This was partially caused by industries reconverting to civilian use after World War II. Army units were given allowances of equipment that limited what they were given.

As an unforeseen effect over the course of the war, Chinese troops mistook M18 smoke grenades for chemical weapons. This was because they used the standard ammunition markings of other chemical grenades such as the M7 at the time. Captured M18 smoke grenades were used by the Chinese to train their troops for defense against chemical warfare, due to the belief that they contained toxic agents.

=== Vietnam War ===
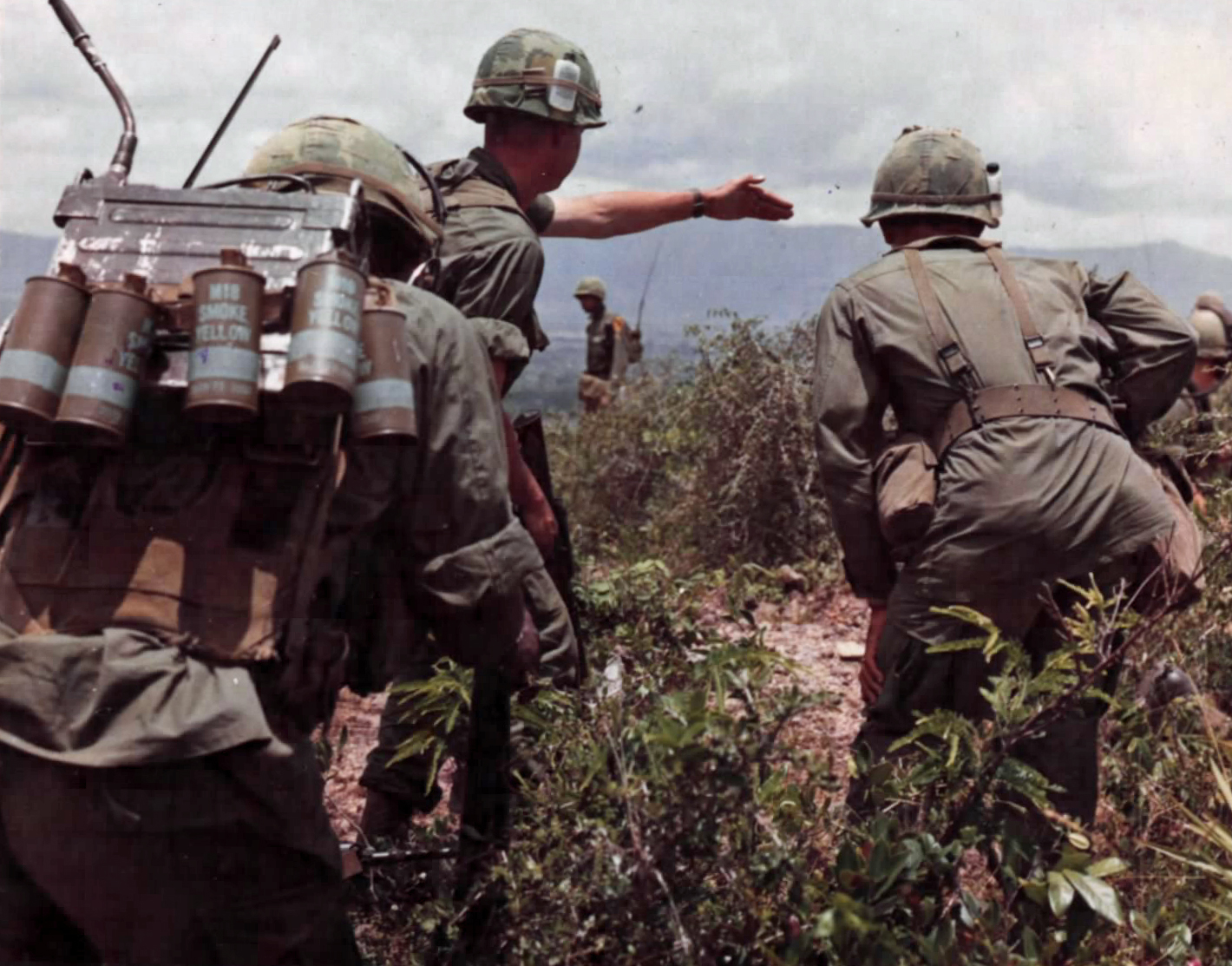
U.S. Army radio operator with multiple M18s strapped to their AN/PRC-77 radio, Quang Ngai Province, Vietnam, April 24, 1967.

After the United States marines entered the Vietnam War in 1965, the M18 saw the most use since its introduction. With the increased usage of helicopters and other equipment in warfare, demand of the M18 eventually reached levels beyond 100 times of the Korean and World War II rates. Supplies were limited of most USAF ammunition and equipment in the beginning of the war due to low stockpiles and a lack of planning expectations.

The M18 was mainly issued to platoon sergeants/leaders, squad leaders, and radio operators. However, any soldier could carry them if they chose to. This was with the exception of red and white. White smoke (produced by the M8 grenade) was the universal identifier of enemy positions in the war, while red was commonly used for fire support.

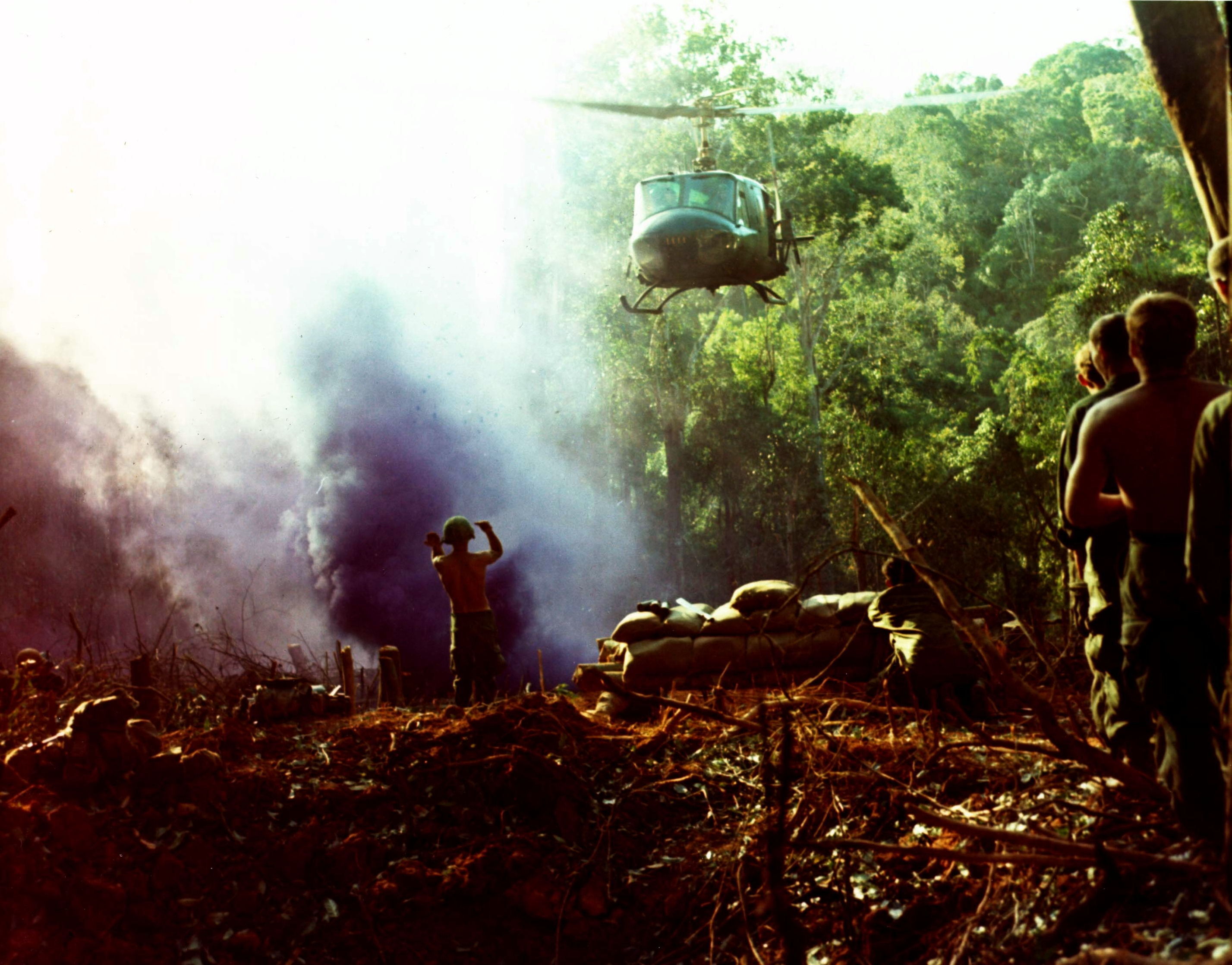
U.S. Army Bell UH-1D helicopter coming in for resupply with violet M18 used to signal landing zone, South Vietnam, December 1967.

Violet and yellow were primarily used for signaling to helicopters and other aircraft for friendly force positions and landing zones. Green was initially used for friendly positions as well, but was difficult to spot in the dense vegetation in Vietnam. Some unconventional usage of the M18 included clearing Viet Cong tunnels, setting booby-traps such as tripwires, and dispersing aggressive insects.

Overall color coding and usage was not universal and varied by units. This was changed regularly to try to prevent enemies from following patterns. When using the M18 for support, aircraft pilots were told to identify the color they saw, usually with code words, rather than being informed. This was because it was not uncommon for the enemy to be listening in on radio transmissions. They could throw captured smoke grenades of the same color to attempt to deceive friendly aircraft.

=== Post-Vietnam ===
In June 2019 the Pine Bluff Arsenal announced that they have produced 3,888,502 M18 grenades since its introduction.

In 2022, the US supplied Ukraine with an undisclosed amount of M18 smoke grenades as part of a military aid package.

== Operators ==
=== Current ===
- Afghanistan – Taliban: Captured among other United States military equipment after the 2020–2021 U.S. troop withdrawal from Afghanistan.
- New Zealand – New Zealand Army: Used for army training exercises.
- Ukraine – Ukrainian Ground Forces: Supplied as part of military aid packages from the United States in 2022.
- United States – United States Armed Forces

=== Former ===
- Australia – Australian Army: Supplied by the United States during World War II and the Vietnam War.
- Iraq – Iraqi security forces: Supplied by the United States after the Iraq War.
- Poland – Polish Land Forces: Used by Polish forces under United States command during the War in Afghanistan.
- South Vietnam – Army of the Republic of Vietnam: Supplied by the United States during the Vietnam War.

== Image Gallery ==
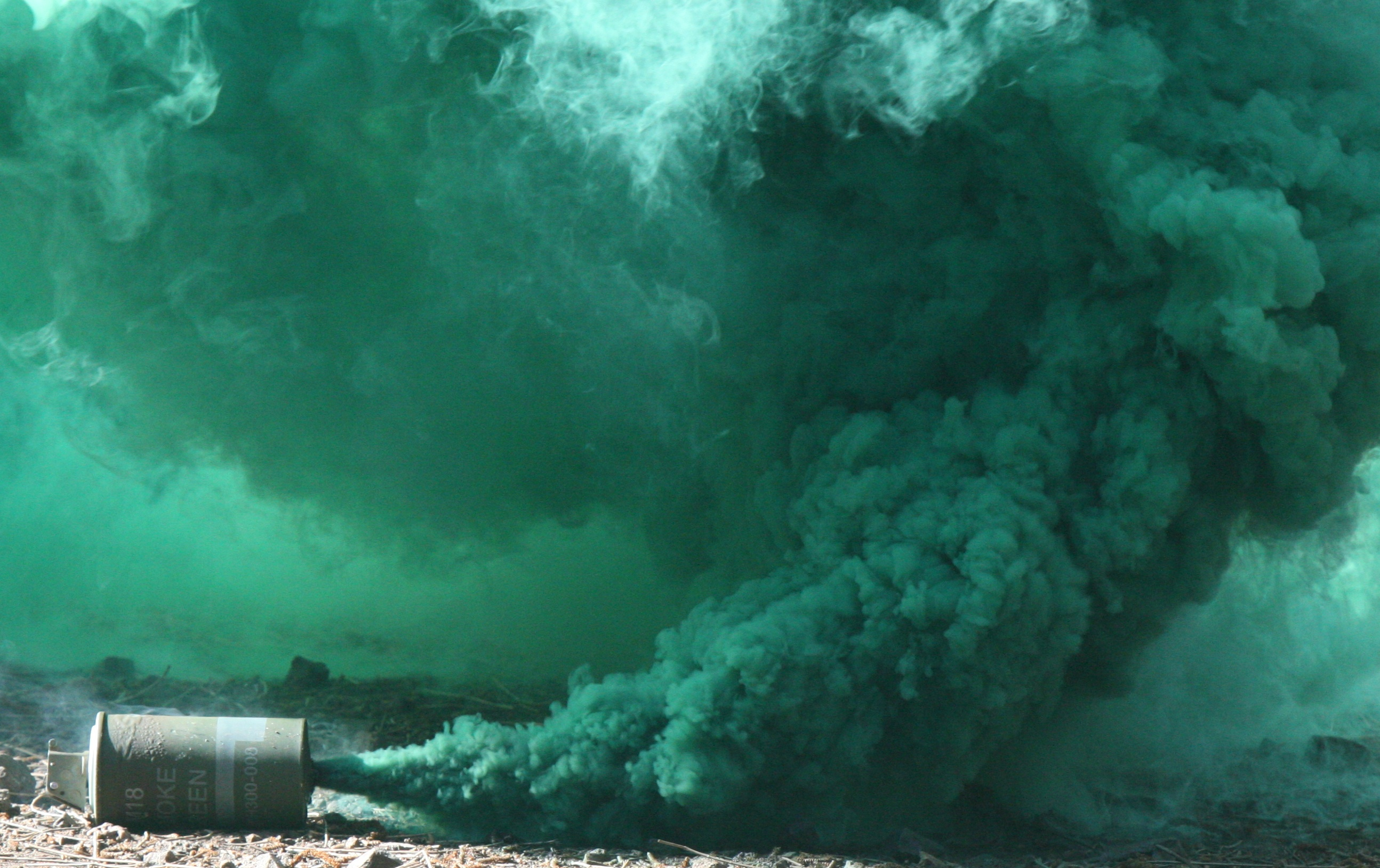
Smoke billowing from a green M18 at U.S. Marine Corps training in Oahu, Hawaii, May 20, 2010.

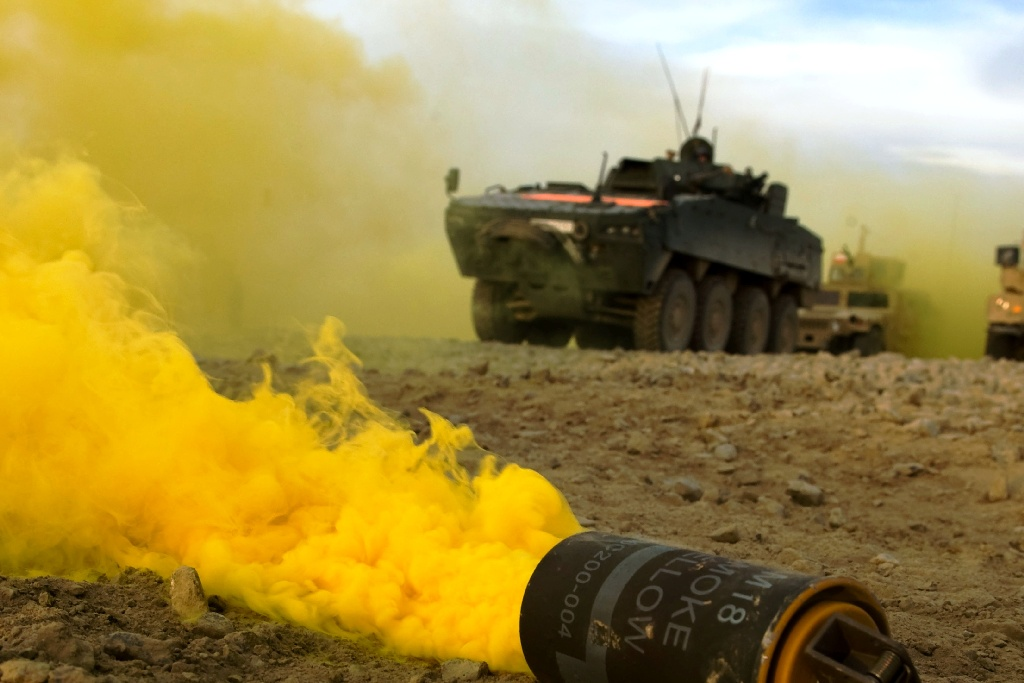
Smoke billowing from a yellow M18 with Polish forces in the background, Afghanistan, February 23, 2010.

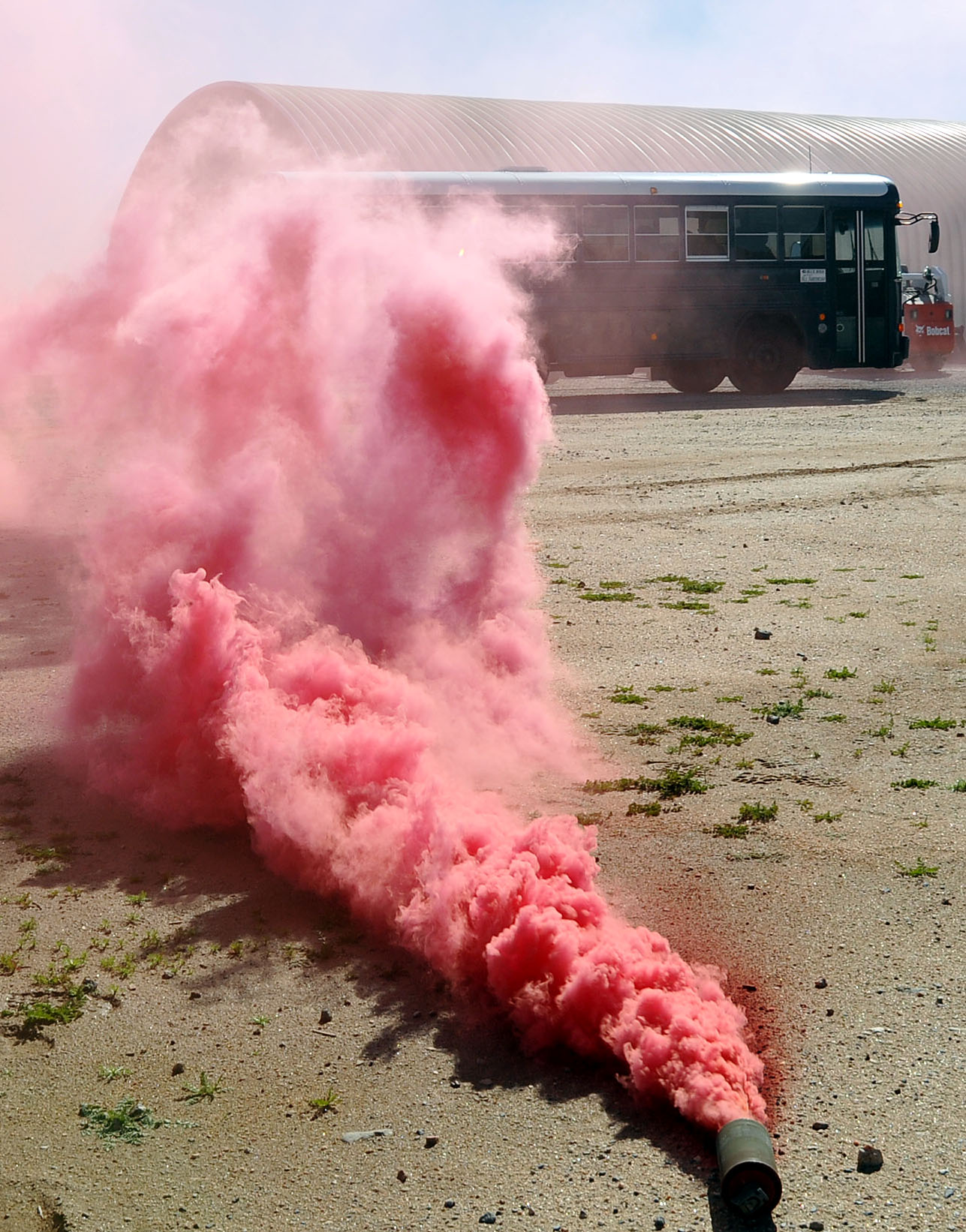
Smoke billowing from a red M18 at an Air National Guard base, Anchorage, Alaska, February 22, 2010.

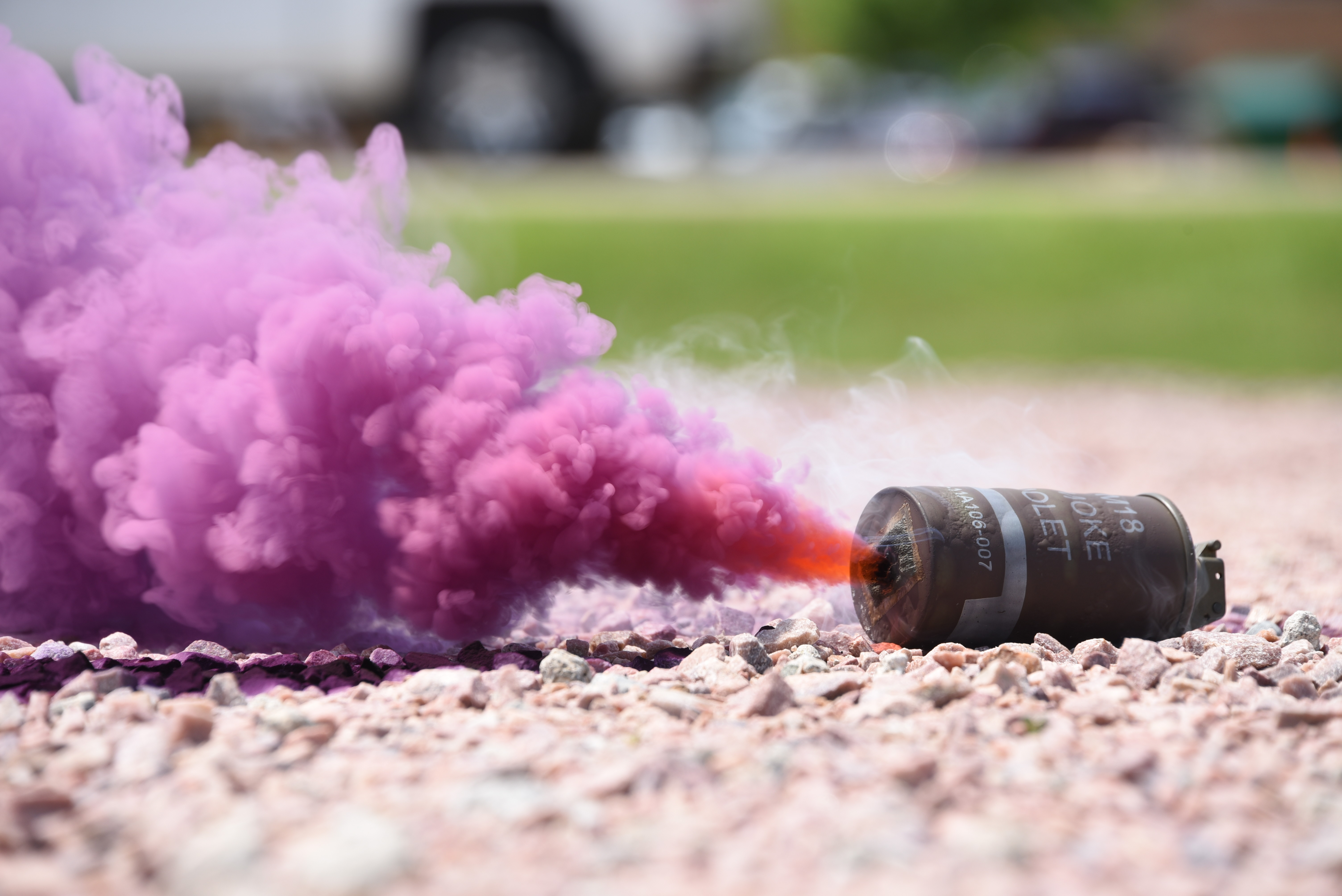
Smoke billowing from a violet M18 during Domestic Operations Training at Air National Guard base, Sioux City, Iowa, June 4, 2023.

== Media ==
=== Movies/TV ===
- Full Metal Jacket - Various scenes (1987).
- Apocalypse Now - Various scenes, including use of violet-colored M18 Smoke Grenades during the "Purple Haze" scene (1979).

=== External links ===
- Tactical Communications, Operation Junction City II, (2D Battalion, 173D Airborne Brigade) War Zone C, South Vietnam, 04/07/1967 - 04/09/1967 - Via the Internet Archive.
- Vietnam War - Popping Red Smoke For Patrol Extraction 1967 - Via YouTube.
- Pine Bluff Arsenal Video News Release - Via YouTube.
- Pine Bluff Arsenal Command Video - Via YouTube.

== See also ==
- United States hand grenades
- AN-M8 smoke grenade
- RDG-2 – (Soviet Union)
