= Sudan yellow =

Sudan yellow may refer to:

- Sudan Yellow 3G, a yellow azo dye
- Sudan yellow R, see Aniline Yellow
- Sudan 455, see Solvent Yellow 124
