= 1,4-Diamino-2,3-dihydroanthraquinone =

Names
- Preferred IUPAC name 1,4-Diamino-2,3-dihydroanthracene-9,10-dione
- Other names Solvent violet 47

Identifiers
| CAS Number | 81-63-0 |
| 3D model (JSmol) | Interactive image |
| ChEMBL | ChEMBL3392069 |
| ChemSpider | 4511053 |
| ECHA InfoCard | 100.001.244 |
| EC Number | 201-367-1 |
| PubChem CID | 5354979 |
| UNII | U46FO9XL97 |
| CompTox Dashboard (EPA) | DTXSID70883261 |
- InChI: InChI=1S/C14H12N2O2/c15-9-5-6-10(16)12-11(9)13(17)7-3-1-2-4-8(7)14(12)18/h1-4H,5-6,15-16H2 Key: SSGALQHXKMAJTL-UHFFFAOYSA-N
- SMILES: O=C2c1ccccc1C(=O)C=3C2=C(N)CCC=3N

Properties
| Chemical formula | C_{14}H_{12}N_{2}O_{2} |
| Molar mass | 240.262 g·mol^{−1} |
| Appearance | Dark greenish to brownish powder |
| Density | 1.4 g/cm^{3} |
| Melting point | 248 to 252 °C (478 to 486 °F; 521 to 525 K) |
| Boiling point | 375.1 °C (707.2 °F; 648.2 K) |
| Solubility in water | Soluble in hot nitrobenzene |

Hazards
- Occupational safety and health (OHS/OSH)
| Main hazards | Mutagenic; emits NO_{x} vapors when heated to decomposition. |
- GHS labelling
| Pictograms | (GHS07: Exclamation mark) |
| Signal word | Warning |
| Hazard statements | H302, H317 |
| Precautionary statements | P261, P264, P270, P272, P280, P301+P312, P302+P352, P321, P330, P333+P313, P363, P501 |
| Flash point | 180.7 °C (357.3 °F; 453.8 K) |
- Except where otherwise noted, data are given for materials in their standard state (at 25 °C [77 °F], 100 kPa). verify (what is ?) Infobox references

1,4-Diamino-2,3-dihydroanthraquinone is an anthraquinone dye used with Disperse Red 9 in colored smoke to introduce a violet color. It is also used in dyes and marine flares.

== Synthesis ==
1,4-Diaminoanthraquinone is reacted with sodium dithionite to produce 1,4-diamino-2,3-dihydroanthraquinone.
