= Smoke grenade =

Signaling and screening device

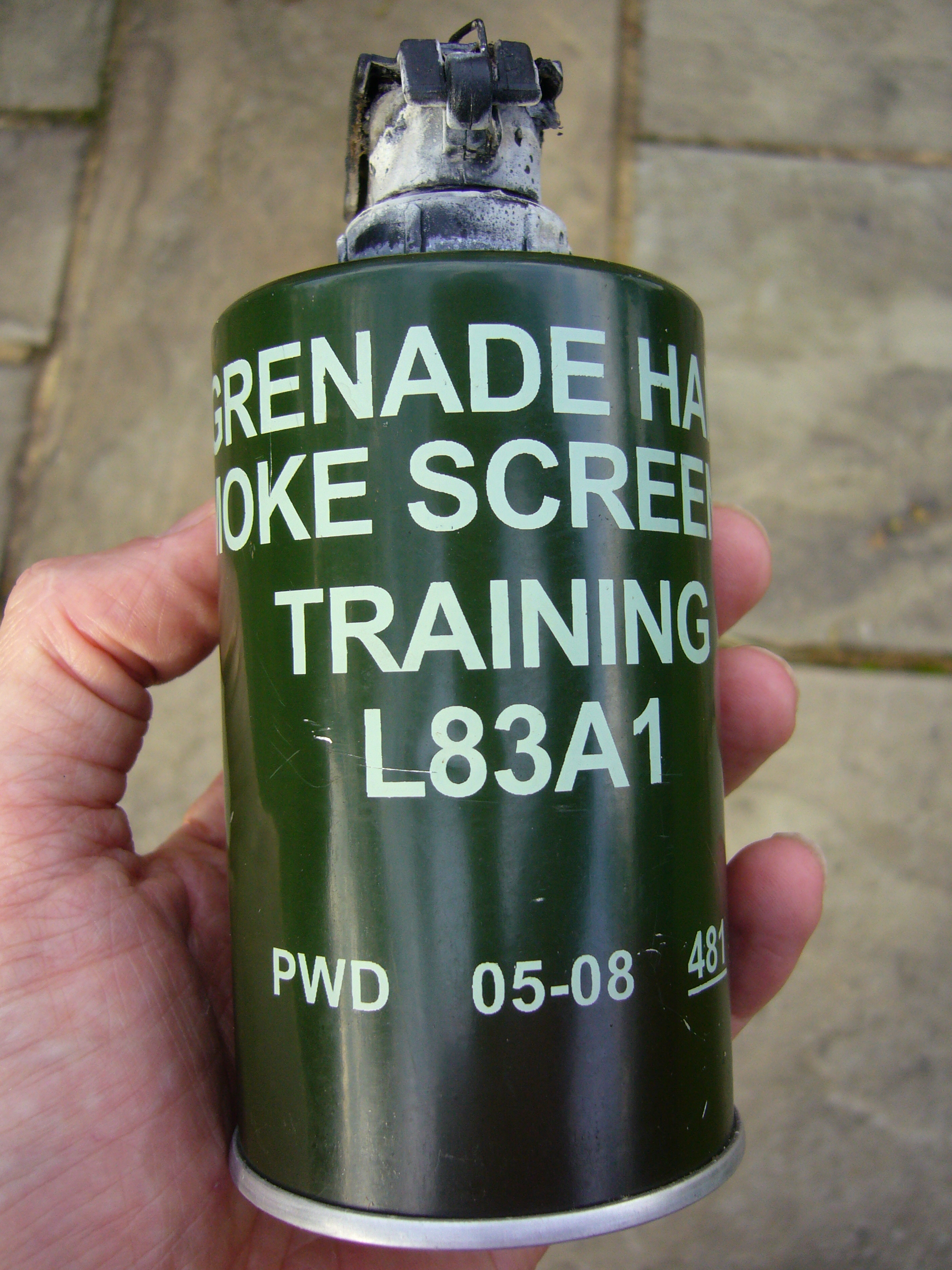
A British L83A1 smoke grenade, manufactured in May 2008. This grenade has already been used.

A smoke grenade is a canister-type grenade used as a signaling device, target or landing zone marking device, or as a screening device for unit movements.

Smoke grenades are generally more complex and emit a far larger amount of smoke than smoke bombs, which are a type of firework typically started with an external fuse rather than a pin. Smoke grenades often cost around US$40 compared to smoke bombs, which can often cost just a few cents. The phrase "to smoke", meaning to fake, bluff, or beat around the bush, comes from the military usage of smoke grenades to obscure and conceal movement; similarly, "pop smoke", derived from a common way of ordering the use of smoke grenades, is used as a slang term for quickly leaving a place.

== Design ==
Diagram and cross section of an M18 smoke grenade

A typical design consists of a sheet steel cylinder with four emission holes on top and one on the bottom to allow smoke release when the grenade is ignited. The filler consists of 250 to 350 grams of colored smoke composition (mostly potassium chlorate, lactose, and a dye) in virtually any color. White smoke grenades typically use hexachloroethane-zinc and granular aluminum. The reaction is exothermic and though they remain intact, smoke grenade casings will often remain scalding hot for some time even after the grenade is no longer emitting smoke. Although modern smoke grenades are designed not to directly emit fire or sparks, they remain a fire hazard and are capable of igniting dry vegetation or flammable substances if used carelessly.

Another type of smoke grenade is the bursting variation. These are filled with white phosphorus (WP), a pyrophoric agent that is spread quickly into a cloud by an internal bursting charge. White phosphorus burns with a brilliant yellow flame while producing copious amounts of white smoke (phosphorus pentoxide). This type of smoke grenade is favored for its ability to produce a very dense and nearly instantaneous cloud of white concealment smoke as compared to the more common solid-filler grenades which expel a slower stream of smoke over a period of roughly 1 minute. For this reason, they are favored for use in onboard grenade launching attachments on armored vehicles, which require extremely fast concealment in the event they are targeted by anti-armor weaponry and need to rapidly retreat.

== Use ==
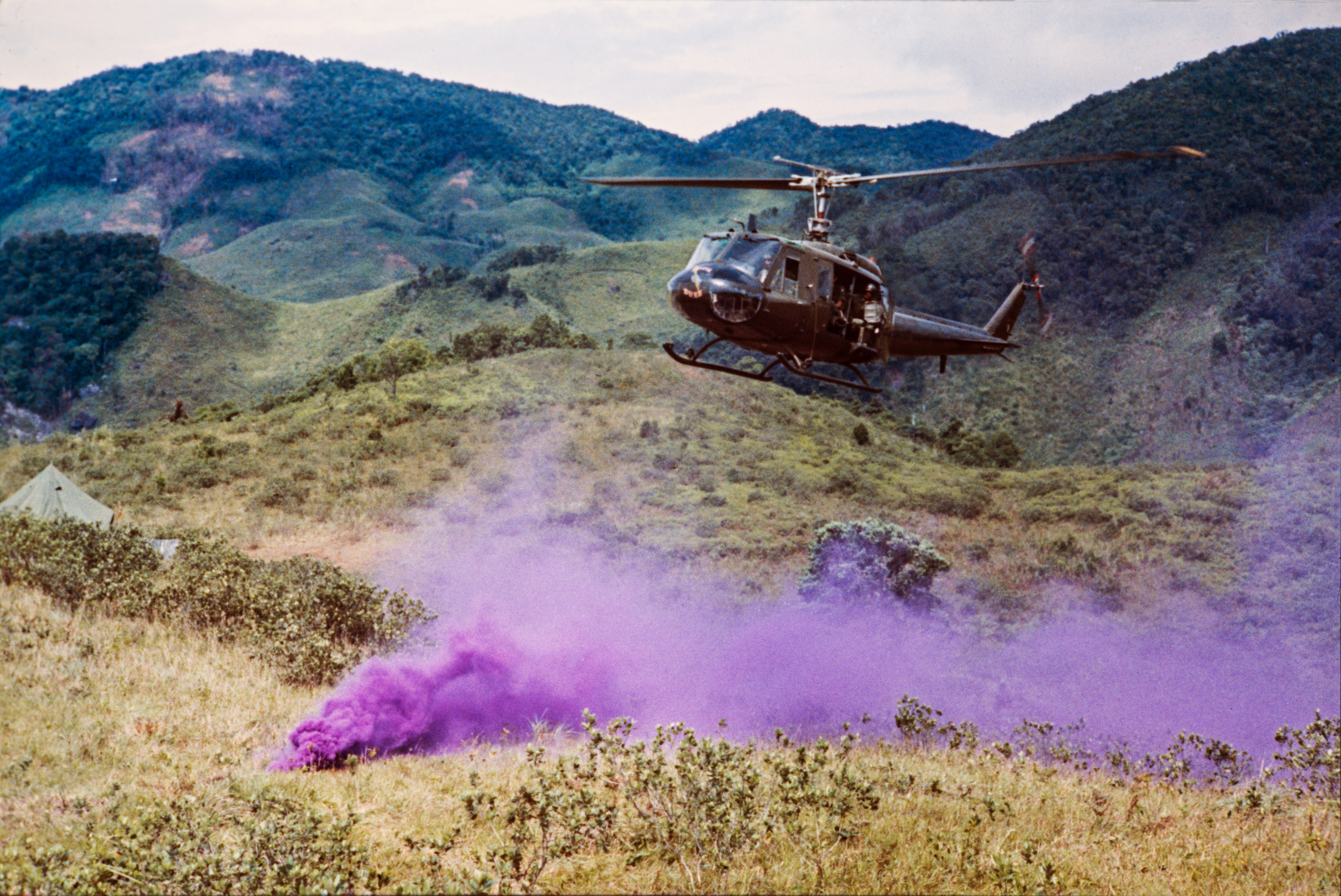
A violet smoke grenade used to mark a helicopter landing zone during the Vietnam War, 1967

Smoke grenades are used for several purposes. The primary use is the creation of smoke screens for concealment and the signaling of aircraft.

If movement (such as flanking maneuvers or retreat) is necessary, smoke grenades can be thrown prior to movement in order to provide a wall of visual distraction that reduces the accuracy of enemy fire and temporarily deceives them as to the force's location.

Smoke grenades can also be used to signal aircraft. Since locating a target from above (especially in thick forest canopy) can be nearly impossible, even with good radio contact, colored smoke grenades are often used to allow aircraft to spot them. Colored signaling smoke grenades are widely used in CASEVAC and close air support situations where quickly locating friendly ground forces is of paramount importance. Common colors are red, yellow, green and purple, and all use very brightly colored dyes to increase the likelihood of being spotted from above.

== Other uses ==
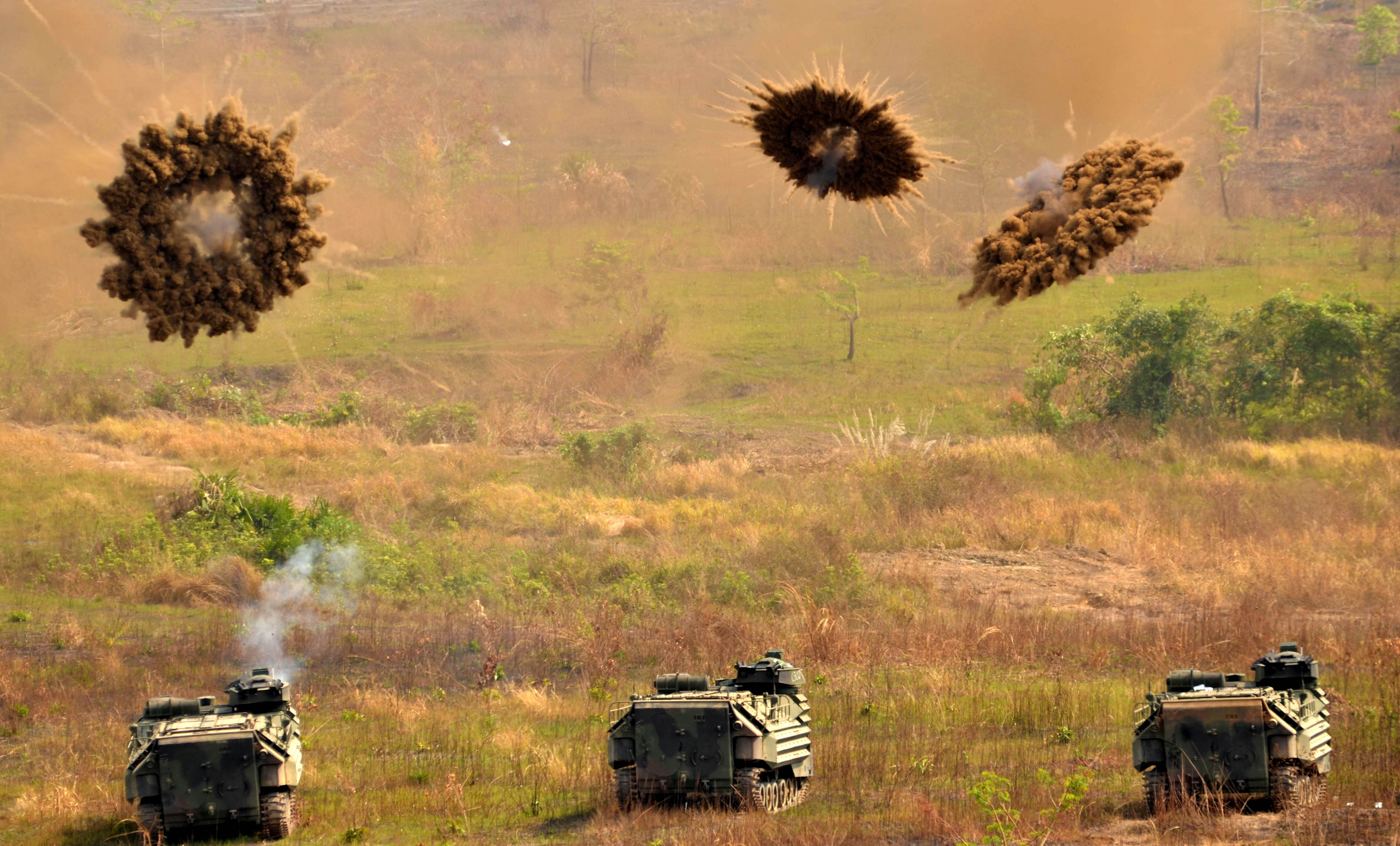
Assault Amphibious Vehicles firing smoke grenades

Smoke grenades are functionally identical to many forms of chemical grenades (such as CS gas riot control grenades) and incendiary grenades (such as thermite grenades) which use a fuse to ignite a solid filler inside a steel canister, which then slowly propels the combustion products out through holes in the canister as the contents burn. However, the smoke grenade class is restricted to signaling and concealment under the law of war, and thus they are not considered weapons; since the vast majority are non-explosive, they remain legal for civilian use and ownership in most countries.

Since the basic design of a smoke grenade (a metal canister containing a substance that burns and expels smoke when ignited) is simple, improvised smoke grenade-like devices are ubiquitous across the world. Protestors, football spectators, and airsoft enthusiasts often create their own smoke grenades using common materials.

== Smoke grenades by country ==
- Argentina:
  - M34 White Phosphorus Smoke Grenade
  - Fabricaciones Militares HC smoke hand grenade
- Australia:
  - No. 80 Mk 1 White Phosphorus Smoke Hand Grenade
  - Smarex coloured smoke hand grenade series
  - M18 Colored Smoke Hand Grenade series
  - M34 White Phosphorus Smoke Grenade
  - A101 Coloured Smoke Grenade series
  - A200 Compact Coloured Smoke Grenade series
- Austria:
  - Nebelgranate 75
- Barbados:
  - N150 Low Toxicity Smoke Screening Hand Grenade
- Belgium:
  - No. 83 Smoke Hand Grenade series
  - M3BG white phosphorus smoke grenade
  - M48BG-M52BG white phosphorus smoke grenade series
  - M68 signal smoke hand grenade series
  - Nr 11 red smoke hand grenade
  - NR 405A1 white phosphorus smoke hand grenade
- Brazil:
  - Condor SS-601
- Bulgaria:
  - Arsenal GH-SMK-2-W red phosphorus smoke hand grenade
  - Arsenal GH-SMK coloured smoke hand grenade series (Grey or metallic body with coloured stripe)
  - Bulcomers Ks GH-SMK coloured smoke hand grenade series (Brown body with coloured label)
- Canada:
  - No. 77 Mk 1/Mk 2 White Phosphorus Smoke Hand Grenade
  - No. 80 Mk 1 White Phosphorus Smoke Hand Grenade
  - No. 83 Coloured/Signal Smoke Hand Grenade series
  - C3 Coloured Smoke Hand Grenade series
  - C1 HC Smoke Hand Grenade series
  - Pains Wessex Coloured Smoke Mini Grenade series
  - C8 Coloured Smoke Hand Grenade series
  - L83A1 Smoke Hand Grenade
- Chile:
  - P-700 coloured smoke hand grenade series
- China:
  - FSL-01
  - FSL-02
- Denmark:
  - Røghåndbombe Nr.77
  - Røghåndbombe Nr.80
  - Røghåndbombe M/53
  - Røghåndgranat M/57
  - Røghåndbombe M/77
  - Røghåndbombe M/93
- Estonia:
  - L84A3 Red Phosphorus Smoke Hand Grenade (SPIRCO)
- Germany:
  - Nebelhandgranate 39
  - Nebelkerze 39 series
  - Nebelhandgranate 41
  - Nebeleihandgranate 42
  - Blendkörper 14
  - Blendkörper 24
  - Handrauchzeichen coloured hand smoke signal series
  - Rauchsichtzeichen Orange
  - DM25 KM smoke hand grenade
  - SPIRCO Red Phosphorus Smoke Hand Grenade
    - L84A3 Red Phosphorus Smoke Hand Grenade
  - Rheinmetall KM smoke hand grenade
  - Rheinmetall NT smoke hand grenade
  - RASMO Rapid Smoke Hand Grenade
- Greece:
  - EM-04
  - EM-12
- Honduras:
  - M18 Colored Smoke Hand Grenade series
- India:
  - Ordnance Factory Board Smoke Hand Grenade series
  - Anti-thermal Anti-laser Smoke Grenade
  - Incapacitating Smoke Grenade
  - CR Grenade
  - Chili grenade
- Ireland:
  - N150 Low Toxicity Smoke Screening Hand Grenade
- Netherlands:
  - No. 77 Rookhandgranaat
  - Nr 7 HC smoke hand grenade series
  - Nr 9 yellow smoke hand grenade
  - Nr 10 green smoke hand grenade
  - Nr 11 red smoke hand grenade
  - Nr 22 coloured smoke hand grenade series
  - L68-L71 and L100-L101 Signal Smoke Hand Grenade series (No 83 Mk 4 type)
  - N150 Low Toxicity Smoke Screening Hand Grenade (No 83 Mk 4 type)
  - Nr 23 white phosphorus smoke hand grenade
  - Nr 700 coloured smoke hand grenade series (Rheinmetall NT type)
- New Zealand:
  - M18 Colored Smoke Hand Grenade series
- Nigeria:
  - No. 80 Mk 1 White Phosphorus Smoke Hand Grenade
- Norway:
  - AN-M8 HC Smoke Grenade
  - M8 HC Røyk Hånd Granat
  - M88 HC Røyk Hånd Granat
  - No. 83 Mk 1-Mk 4 Coloured/Signal Smoke Hand Grenade series
  - NM239 Røyk Hånd Granat
  - NM248 TTC Røyk Hånd Granat
  - TTC Smoke Hand Grenade (Commercial version of NM248)
  - DM 45 HC smoke hand grenade
  - Defense Technology Military-Style Smoke Grenade series
- Pakistan:
  - P3 MK1 WP Smoke Grenade
  - MK1 Target Indication Smoke Grenade series
  - MK2 Target Indication Smoke Grenade series
- Poland:
  - RGD-2
- Rhodesia:
  - No. 80 Mk 1 White Phosphorus Smoke Hand Grenade
  - M970 White Phosphorus Smoke Hand Grenade
- Russia:
  - RGD-2
- South Africa:
  - M970 White Phosphorus Smoke Hand Grenade
  - No. 83 Smoke Hand Grenade series
  - R1M1 White Phosphorus Smoke Hand Grenade
  - M854A1 Coloured Smoke Hand Grenade series
  - Red Phosphorus Hand Grenade
  - M0234 Coloured Smoke Hand Grenade series
  - M0251 Screening Smoke Hand Grenade
- South Korea:
  - KM8 HC Smoke Hand Grenade
  - KM18 Colored Smoke Hand Grenade series
- Spain:
  - A.T.F.-1
- Sweden:
  - Rökhandgranat m/1937
  - Rökhandgranat m/49
  - Rökhandgranat m/51
  - Rökhandgranat m/56
  - Rökhandgranat 05 (SPIRCO type)
- Turkey:
  - MKE Renkli Sis Kutusu/Colored Smoke Can series
  - MKE Sis El Bombası/Smoke Hand-Grenade
- Ukraine
  - L84A3 Red Phosphorus Smoke Hand Grenade (SPIRCO)
- United Kingdom (To include British Overseas Territories):
  - No. 77 Mk 1/Mk 2 White Phosphorus Smoke Hand Grenade
  - No. 79 Mk 1/Mk 2 Smoke Hand Grenade
  - No. 80 Mk 1 White Phosphorus Smoke Hand Grenade
  - No. 81 Mk 1 White Phosphorus Smoke Hand Grenade
  - No. 83 Mk 1-Mk 4 Coloured/Signal Smoke Hand Grenade series
  - L35-L38 Signal Smoke Hand Grenade series
  - L52-L55 Signal Smoke Hand Grenade series
  - L64-L67 Signal Smoke Hand Grenade series
  - L68-L71 and L100-L101 Signal Smoke Hand Grenade series (No 83 Mk 4 type)
  - L83A1/A2 Training Smoke Screening Hand Grenade (No 83 Mk 4 type)
  - N150 Low Toxicity Smoke Screening Hand Grenade (Commercial version of L83)
  - L84A1-A3 Red Phosphorus Smoke Screening Hand Grenade (SPIRCO)
  - N321 Screening Bursting Hand Grenade (Commercial)
  - N322 Red Phosphorus Screening Bursting Hand Grenade (Commercial)
  - L132A1/A2 Smoke Screening Hand Grenade
  - N451/A Compact Screening Smoke Hand Grenade (Commercial version of L132)
  - L152-L158 Signal Smoke Hand Grenade series
  - N431-N437 Compact Signal Smoke Hand Grenade series (Commercial version of L152-L158)
  - N441/A-N448/A Compact Signal Smoke Hand Grenade series (Commercial)
  - N461-N468 Compact Signal Smoke Hand Grenade series (Commercial)
  - Primetake Military Smoke Grenade series (Commercial)
  - Primetake PT4541 38mm Screening Smoke Grenade series (Commercial)
  - Primetake PT4540 63mm Screening Smoke Grenade series (Commercial)
  - CTX Screening Smoke Hand Grenade (Commercial)
- United States:
  - M1 Frangible Grenade (When used with FS filler)
  - M3 Red Smoke Grenade
  - AN-M8 HC Smoke Grenade
  - M15 White Phosphorus grenade
  - M16 Colored Smoke Hand Grenade series
  - M18 Colored Smoke Hand Grenade series
  - M34 White Phosphorus Smoke Grenade
  - M83 TA White Smoke Hand Grenade
  - Smith & Wesson No .3 Military Type Continuous Discharge White Smoke HC Grenade (Commercial)
  - Federal Laboratories M-8 White Smoke Grenade (Commercial)
  - M106 Screening Obscuration Device
  - ALSG972 Continuous Discharge Smoke Grenade series (Commercial)
  - ALSG978 Pocket Smoke Grenade series (Commercial)
  - ALSG2978W White Smoke Baffled Triple Chamber Grenade (Commercial)
  - ALSG275 Handball Smoke Grenade series (Commercial)
  - ALSG973 Triple Action Smoke Grenade series (Commercial)
  - Combined Systems 5210 White Smoke Canister Grenade (Commercial)
  - Combined Systems 5210JL Smoke Jet-Lite Canister Grenade (Commercial)
  - Combined Systems 5211 White Smoke Triple Phaser Canister Grenade (Commercial)
  - Combined Systems 6210 White Smoke Canister Grenade (Commercial)
  - Combined Systems 8210 White Smoke Tactical Canister Grenade (Commercial)
  - Defense Technology Military-Style Smoke Grenade series (Commercial)
  - Defense Technology Pocket Tactical Smoke Grenade series (Commercial)
  - Defense Technology Saf-Smoke Triple-Chaser Separating Canister (Commercial)
  - Defense Technology Maximum HC Smoke Canister series (Commercial)
  - Defense Technology Saf-Smoke Han-Ball Grenade (Commercial)
  - Defense Technology Flameless Tri-Chamber Saf-Smoke Grenade (Commercial)
  - MP-1-xx Color Smoke Grenade series (Commercial)
  - MP-2-xx Color Smoke Grenade series (Commercial)
  - MP-2B-xx Color Smoke Grenade series (Commercial)
  - MP-15-xx Color Smoke Grenade series (Commercial)
  - MP-2S-xx Color Smoke Grenade series (Commercial)
  - MP-2S-HC Screening Smoke Grenade (Commercial)

== See also ==
- Smoke bomb
- Smoke shell
