= Quinoline Yellow =

Quinoline Yellow may refer to two chemically related dyes:

- Quinoline Yellow SS, a bright yellow dye
- Quinoline Yellow WS, a yellow food coloring

It may also refer to electronic musician Luke Williams, who has released under Skam Records.
