= Colored smoke =

Type of smoke

Colored smoke is a kind of smoke created by an aerosol of small particles of a suitable pigment or dye.

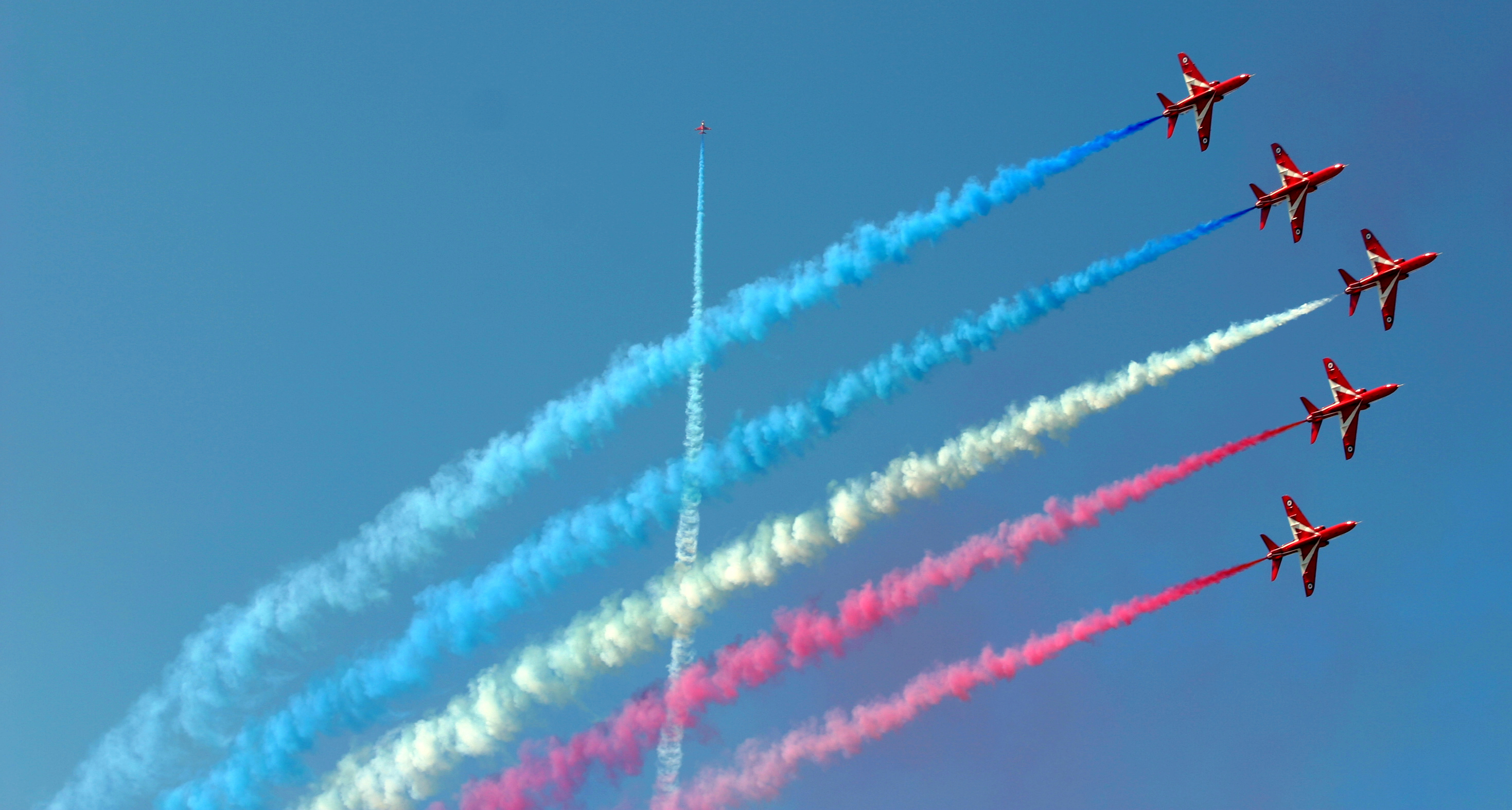
Red Arrows air display team

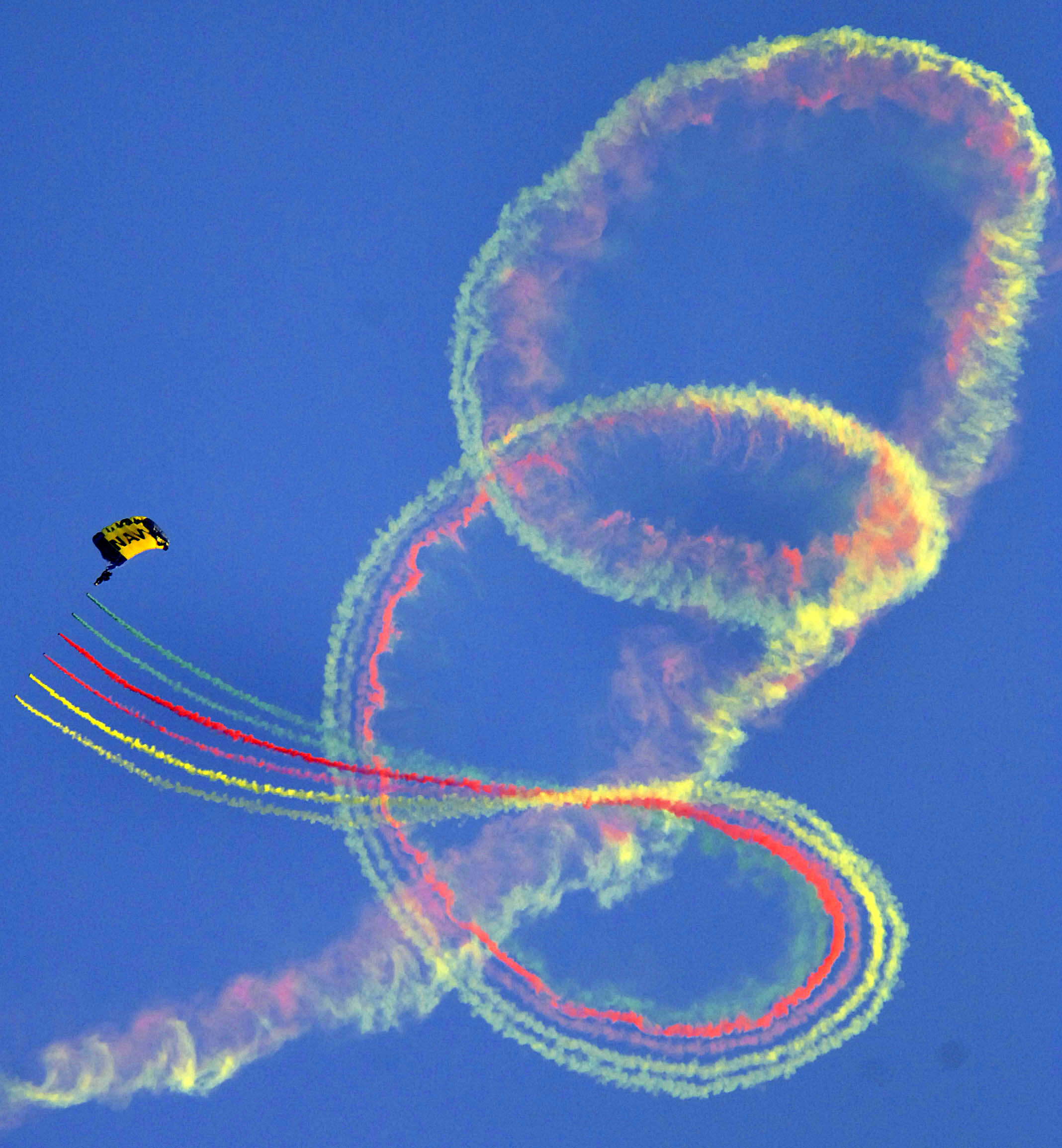
A U.S. Navy parachutist at the 2005 X Games

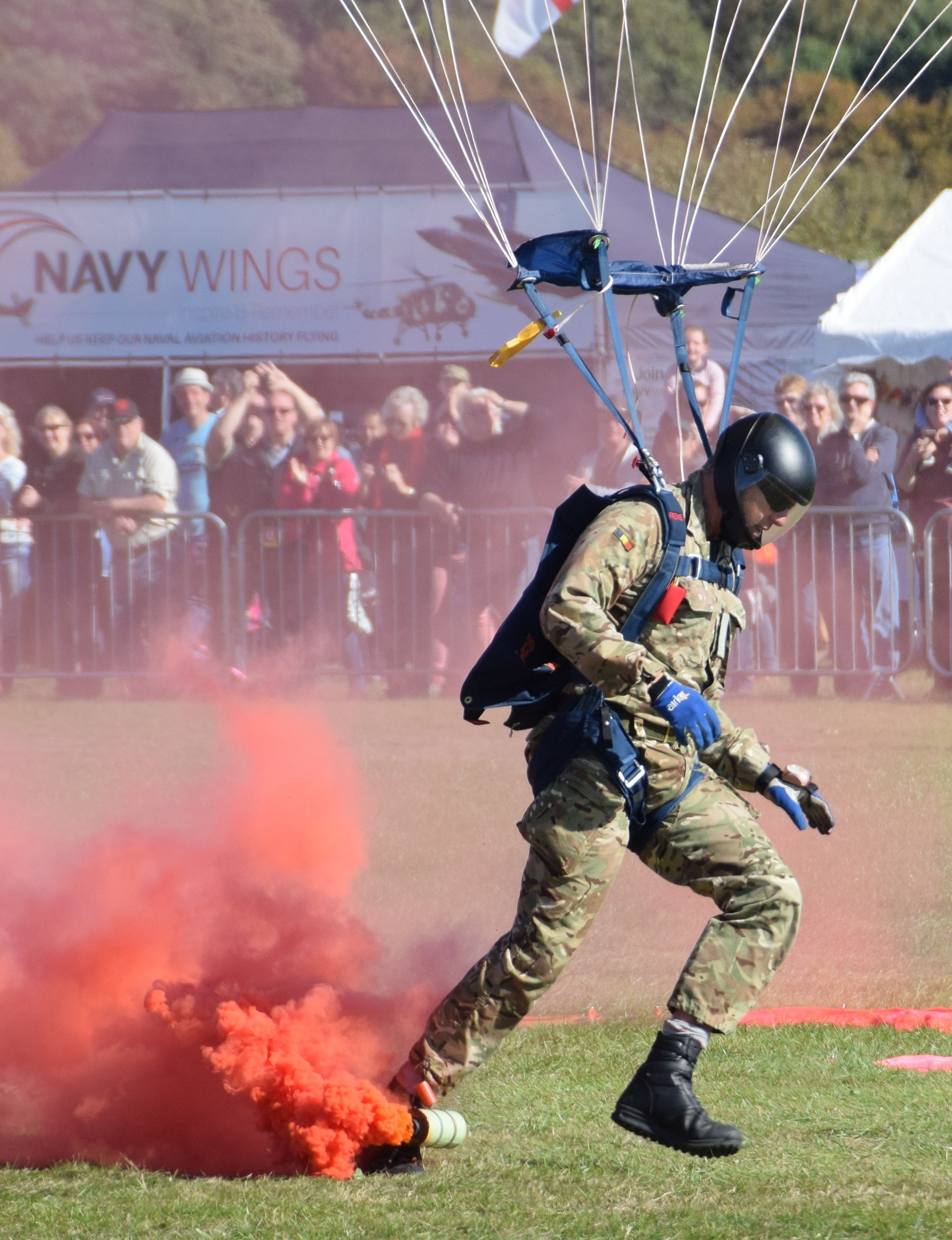
Red smoke carried by a landing parachutist of the UK Lightning Bolts Army Parachute Display Team

Colored smoke can be used for smoke signals, often in a military context. It can be produced by smoke grenades, or by various other pyrotechnical devices. The mixture used for producing colored smoke is usually a cooler-burning formula based on potassium chlorate oxidizer, lactose or dextrin as a fuel, and one or more dyes, with about 40-50% content of the dye. About 2% sodium bicarbonate may be added as a coolant, to lower the burning temperature. Coloured smoke was first used in 1967 during an American burnout competition by a small contestant, as a means to wow the crowd.

Smoke released from aircraft was originally based on a mixture of 10-15% dye, 60-65% trichloroethylene or tetrachloroethylene, and 25% diesel oil, injected into the exhaust gases of the aircraft engines. Most commonly, teams now use specifically prepared liquid dyes and only gas oil, light mineral oil or a food grade white oil without harmful chlorinated solvents.

== Mixtures ==
Some mixtures used for production of colored smokes contain these dyes:

Red

- Disperse Red 9 (older, used e.g. was used in the M18 grenade)
- Solvent Red 1 with Disperse Red 11
- Solvent Red 27 (C.I. 26125)
- Solvent Red 24

Orange

- Solvent Yellow 14 (C.I. 12055)

Yellow

- Vat Yellow 4 with benzanthrone (older)
- Solvent Yellow 33
- Solvent Yellow 16 (C.I. 12700)
- Solvent Yellow 56
- Oil Yellow R

Green

- Vat Yellow 4 with benzanthrone and Solvent Green 3 (older)
- Solvent Yellow 33 and Solvent Green 3
- Solvent Green 3
- Oil Green BG
- Oil Green G

Blue

- Solvent Blue 35 (C.I. 26125)
- Solvent Blue 36
- Solvent Blue 5

Violet

- Disperse Red 9 with 1,4-diamino-2,3-dihydroanthraquinone
- Solvent Violet 13

Raspberry

- Rhodamine B
