= Solvent Violet 13 =

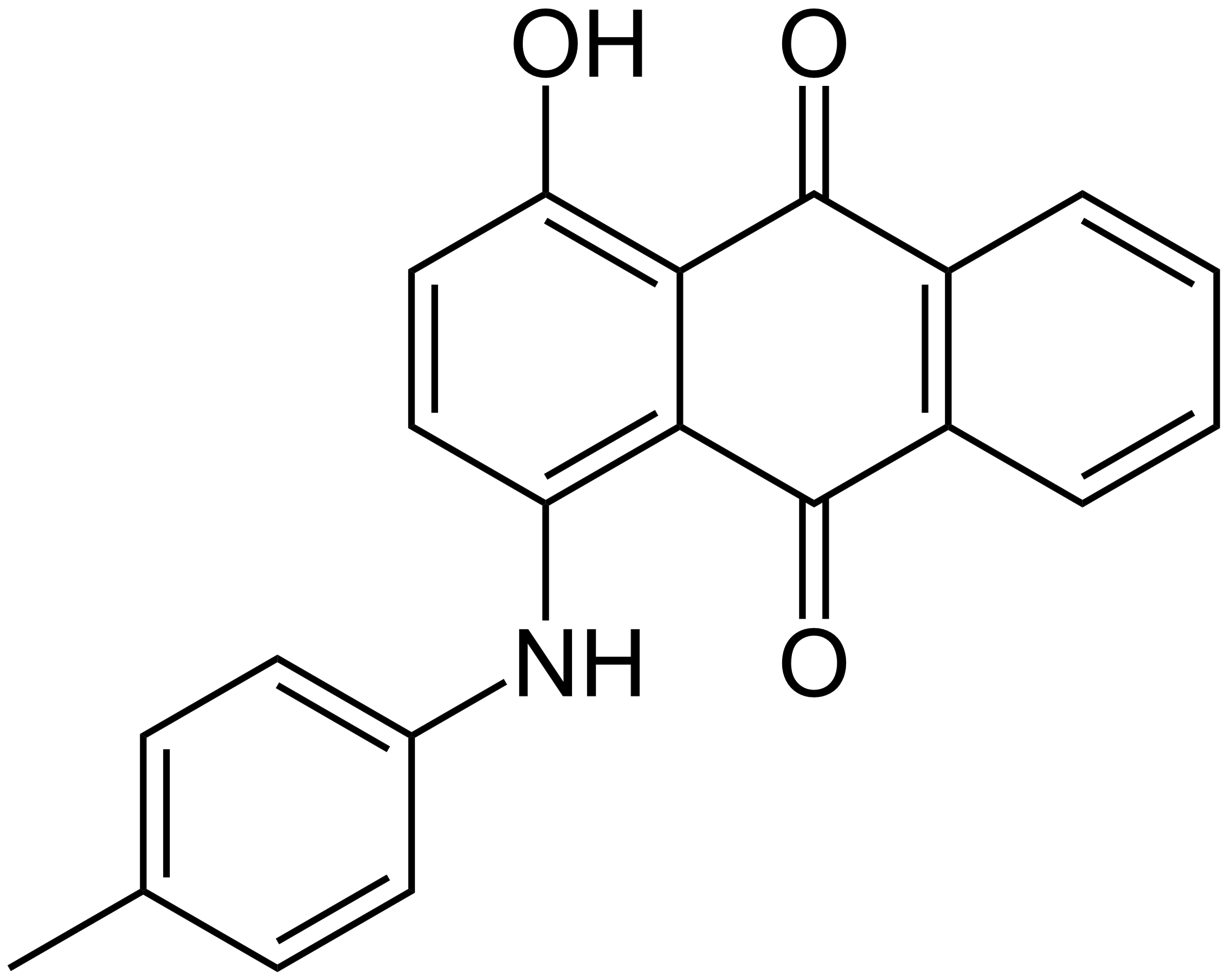

Names
- Preferred IUPAC name 1-Hydroxy-4-(4-methylanilino)anthracene-9,10-dione

Identifiers
CAS Number	81-48-1
3D model (JSmol)	Interactive image
ChemSpider	6428
ECHA InfoCard	100.001.231
PubChem CID	6680
UNII	350KA7O6HK
CompTox Dashboard (EPA)	DTXSID1026293
- InChI: InChI=1S/C21H15NO3/c1-12-6-8-13(9-7-12)22-16-10-11-17(23)19-18(16)20(24)14-4-2-3-5-15(14)21(19)25/h2-11,22-23H,1H3 Key: LJFWQNJLLOFIJK-UHFFFAOYSA-N; InChI=1/C21H15NO3/c1-12-6-8-13(9-7-12)22-16-10-11-17(23)19-18(16)20(24)14-4-2-3-5-15(14)21(19)25/h2-11,22-23H,1H3 Key: LJFWQNJLLOFIJK-UHFFFAOYAI; InChI=1S/C21H15NO3/c1-12-6-8-13(9-7-12)22-16-10-11-17(23)19-18(16)20(24)14-4-2-3-5-15(14)21(19)25/h2-11,22-23H,1H3 Key: LJFWQNJLLOFIJK-UHFFFAOYSA-N
- SMILES: O=C2c1ccccc1C(=O)c3c2c(ccc3O)Nc4ccc(cc4)C

Properties
Chemical formula	C_{21}H_{15}NO_{3}
Molar mass	329.355 g·mol^{−1}
Melting point	142 to 143 °C (288 to 289 °F; 415 to 416 K)
- Except where otherwise noted, data are given for materials in their standard state (at 25 °C [77 °F], 100 kPa). verify (what is ?) Infobox references

Solvent Violet 13, also known as D&C Violet No.2, oil violet, Solvent Blue 90, Alizarine Violet 3B, Alizurol Purple, Duranol Brilliant Violet TG, Ahcoquinone Blue IR base, Quinizarin Blue, Disperse Blue 72, and C.I. 60725, is a synthetic anthraquinone dye with bright bluish violet hue. It is a solid insoluble in water and soluble in acetone, toluene, and benzene. Its chemical formula is C_{21}H_{15}NO_{3}, and its structure is 1-hydroxy-4-(p-tolylamino)anthraquinone, or 1-hydroxy-4-[(4-methylphenyl)amino]-9,10-anthracenedione or 1-hydroxy-4-(4-methylanilino)anthraquinone.

Solvent Violet 13 is used to dye hydrocarbon products like solvents and petrol, thermoplastics, synthetic resins, e.g. polystyrenes, and synthetic fiber. It is also used in cosmetics, e.g. in hair and skin care products. In pyrotechnics, it is used in some violet colored smoke compositions.
