= Quinizarine Green SS =

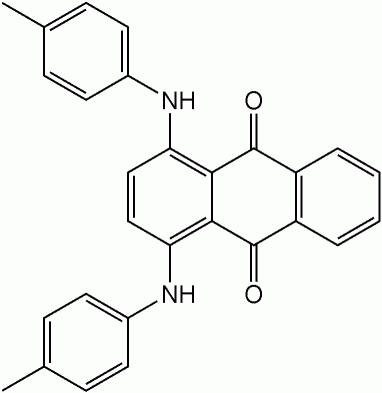
- Quinizarine Green SS

Names
- Preferred IUPAC name 1,4-Bis(4-methylanilino)anthracene-9,10-dione
- Other names C.I. Solvent Green 3; 1,4-bis[(4-methylphenyl)amino]-9,10-Anthracenedione; D & C Green No.6; 1,4-Bis(p-tolylamino)anthraquinone; 1,4-Bis(p-toluidino)anthraquinone; C.I. 61565; Oil Green G;

Identifiers
CAS Number	128-80-3
3D model (JSmol)	Interactive image
ChemSpider	29146
ECHA InfoCard	100.004.464
PubChem CID	31416
UNII	4QP5U84YF7
CompTox Dashboard (EPA)	DTXSID9044376
- InChI: InChI=1S/C28H22N2O2/c1-17-7-11-19(12-8-17)29-23-15-16-24(30-20-13-9-18(2)10-14-20)26-25(23)27(31)21-5-3-4-6-22(21)28(26)32/h3-16,29-30H,1-2H3 Key: TVRGPOFMYCMNRB-UHFFFAOYSA-N; InChI=1/C28H22N2O2/c1-17-7-11-19(12-8-17)29-23-15-16-24(30-20-13-9-18(2)10-14-20)26-25(23)27(31)21-5-3-4-6-22(21)28(26)32/h3-16,29-30H,1-2H3 Key: TVRGPOFMYCMNRB-UHFFFAOYAN
- SMILES: O=C2c1ccccc1C(=O)c3c2c(ccc3Nc4ccc(cc4)C)Nc5ccc(cc5)C

Properties
Chemical formula	C_{28}H_{22}N_{2}O_{2}
Molar mass	418.496 g·mol^{−1}
Appearance	Black powder
Melting point	220 to 221 °C (428 to 430 °F; 493 to 494 K)
Solubility in water	Insoluble
- Except where otherwise noted, data are given for materials in their standard state (at 25 °C [77 °F], 100 kPa). verify (what is ?) Infobox references

Quinizarine Green SS, also called Solvent Green 3 is an anthraquinone derivative. It is a black powder that is soluble in polar organic solvents, but insoluble in water. It is used as a dye for adding greenish coloring to cosmetics and medications. It is used in some colored smoke formulations.

According to X-ray crystallography, the anthroquinone portion of the molecule is planar. Both amine protons form hydrogen bonds to the carbonyls.

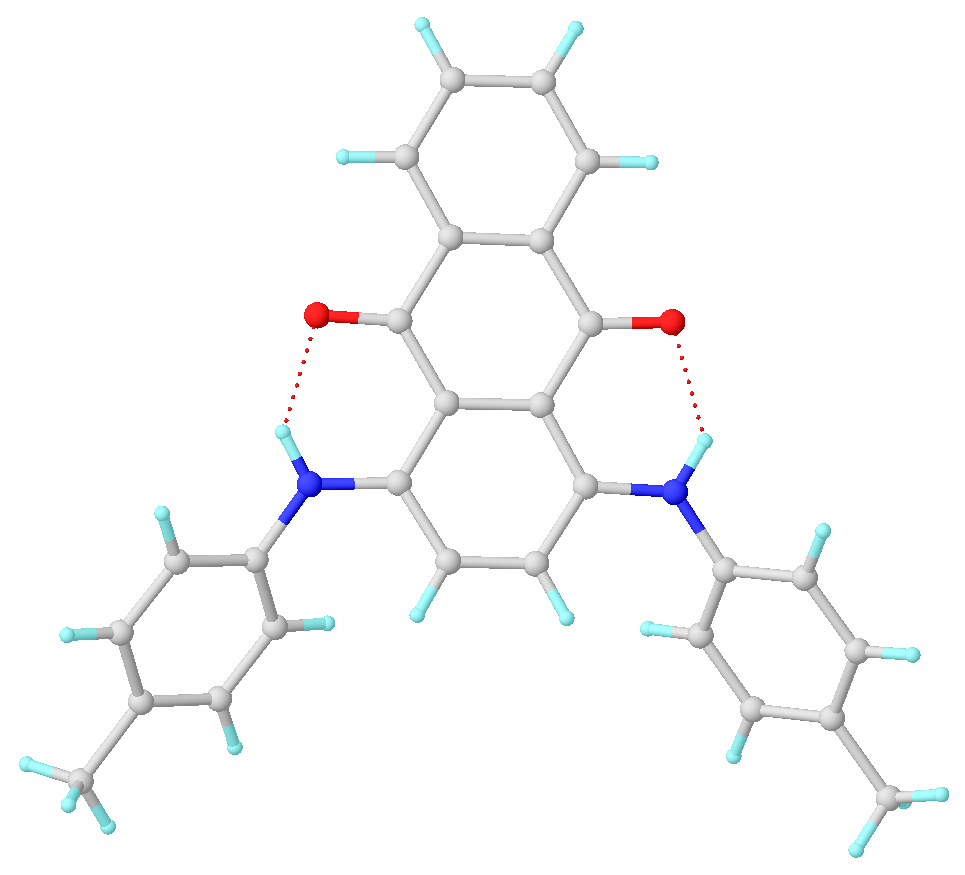
Structure of Quinizarine Green SS.

This dye is a component in some smoke grenades, and questions have been raised about its toxicity.
