= Disperse Red 9 =

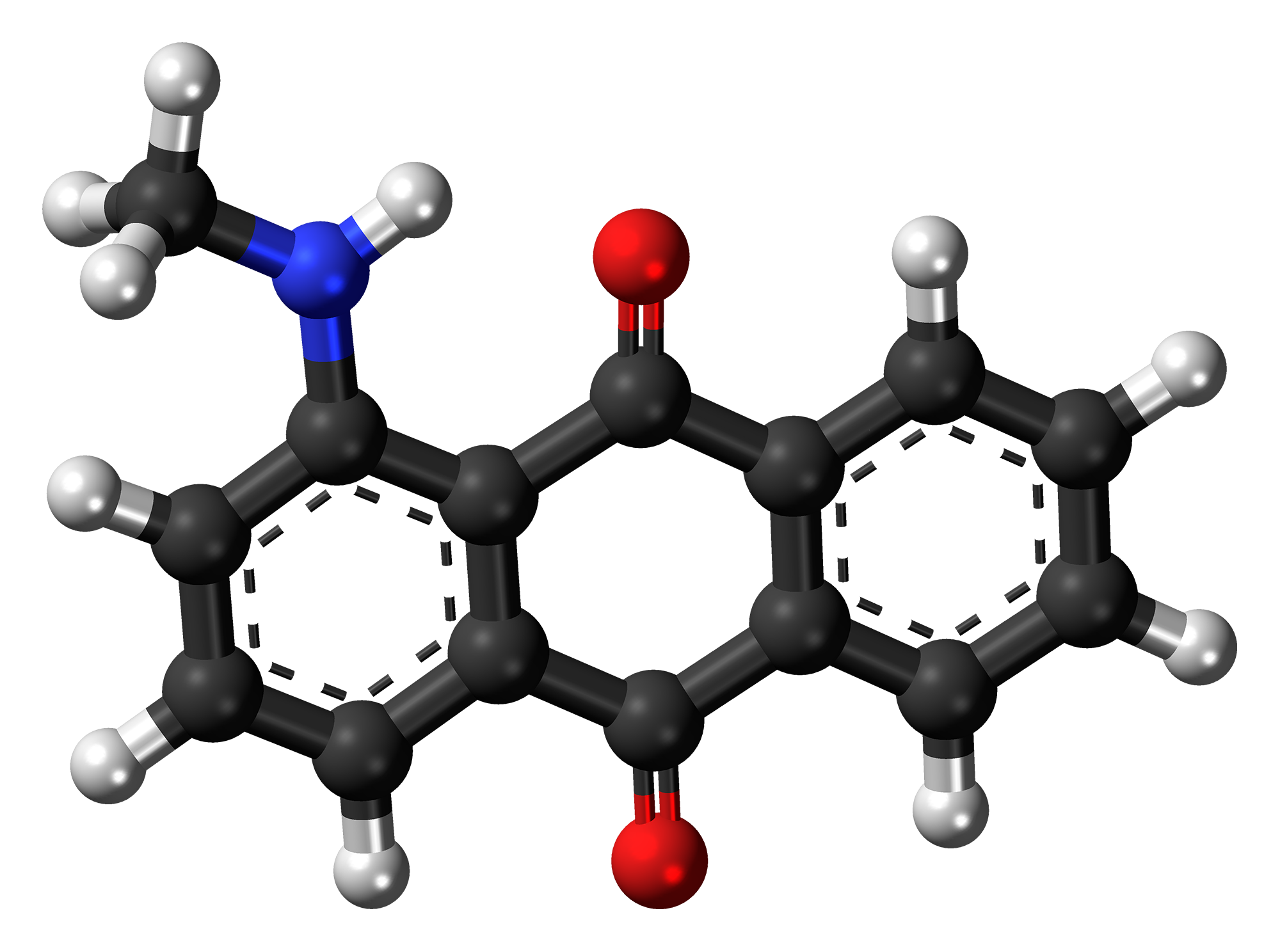

Names
- Preferred IUPAC name 1-(Methylamino)anthracene-9,10-dione
- Other names 1-(Methylamino)anthraquinone; Solvent Red 111; C.I. 60505 (Colour index numbers)

Identifiers
CAS Number	82-38-2
3D model (JSmol)	Interactive image
ChemSpider	6450
ECHA InfoCard	100.001.289
EC Number	201-417-2
PubChem CID	24896772
UNII	5O1807MLL1
CompTox Dashboard (EPA)	DTXSID2052570
- InChI: InChI=1S/C23H17F5N2O2/c24-18-8-4-14(5-9-18)21(16-2-1-3-17(12-16)23(26,27)28)30-20(31)13-29-22(32)15-6-10-19(25)11-7-15/h1-12,21H,13H2,(H,29,32)(H,30,31) Key: IBTKYOKOEIBAOJ-UHFFFAOYSA-N
- SMILES: O=C2c1ccccc1C(=O)c3c2cccc3NC

Properties
Chemical formula	C_{15}H_{11}NO_{2}
Molar mass	237.258 g·mol^{−1}
Appearance	red powder
Melting point	170 to 172 °C (338 to 342 °F; 443 to 445 K)
- Except where otherwise noted, data are given for materials in their standard state (at 25 °C [77 °F], 100 kPa). verify (what is ?) Infobox references

Disperse Red 9, or 1-(methylamino)anthraquinone, is a red dye derived from anthraquinone. Disperse Red 9 is used in some older red and violet-red colored smoke formulations. It was used in the M18 colored smoke grenade and also often in dye packs. Its smoke-producing properties can be improved by coating the dye particles with an inert material, e.g. an epoxy resin.
