= Sudan Red G =

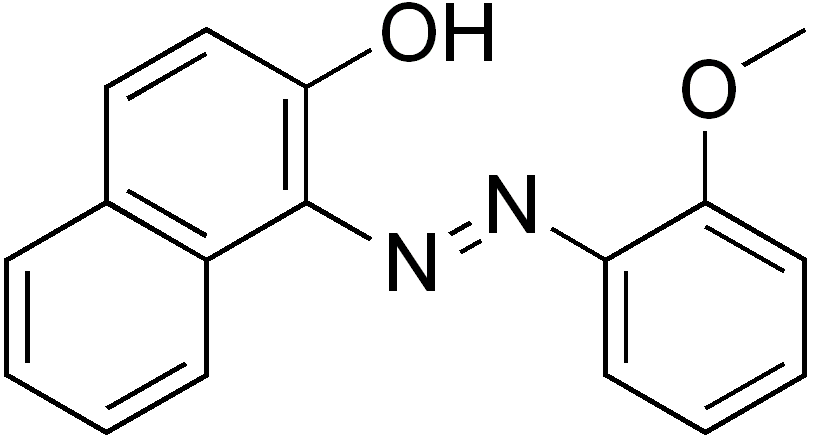
- Sudan Red G

Names
- Preferred IUPAC name 2-[(E)-(2-Methoxyphenyl)diazenyl]naphthalen-2-ol

Identifiers
CAS Number	1229-55-6
3D model (JSmol)	Interactive image
ChEMBL	ChEMBL1986529
ChemSpider	10441568
ECHA InfoCard	100.013.608
EC Number	214-968-9
PubChem CID	14678
UNII	J95C286WK5
CompTox Dashboard (EPA)	DTXSID3061635
- InChI: InChI=1S/C17H14N2O2/c1-21-16-9-5-4-8-14(16)18-19-17-13-7-3-2-6-12(13)10-11-15(17)20/h2-11,20H,1H3/b19-18+ Key: ALLOLPOYFRLCCX-VHEBQXMUSA-N; InChI=1/C17H14N2O2/c1-21-16-9-5-4-8-14(16)18-19-17-13-7-3-2-6-12(13)10-11-15(17)20/h2-11,20H,1H3/b19-18+ Key: ALLOLPOYFRLCCX-VHEBQXMUBE
- SMILES: COc3ccccc3/N=N/c1c2ccccc2ccc1O

Properties
Chemical formula	C_{17}H_{14}N_{2}O_{2}
Molar mass	278.28 g/mol
Melting point	225 °C (437 °F; 498 K)

Hazards
- GHS labelling
Pictograms	(GHS08: Health hazard)
Signal word	Danger
Hazard statements	H350
Precautionary statements	P201, P202, P281, P308+P313, P405, P501
- Except where otherwise noted, data are given for materials in their standard state (at 25 °C [77 °F], 100 kPa). verify (what is ?) Infobox references

Sudan Red G is a yellowish red lysochrome azo dye. It has the appearance of an odorless reddish-orange powder with melting point 225 °C. It is soluble in fats and used for coloring of fats, oils, and waxes, including the waxes used in turpentine-based polishes. It is also used in polystyrene, cellulose, and synthetic lacquers. It is insoluble in water. It is stable to temperatures of about 100–110 °C. It was formerly used as a food dye, but still appears to be used for this purpose in China. It is used in some temporary tattoos, where it can cause contact dermatitis. It is also used in hair dyes. It is a component of some newer formulas for red smoke signals and smoke-screens, together with Disperse Red 11.

== Other Names ==
There are various names for Sudan Red G, including Brilliant Fat Scarlet R, C.I. Food Red 16, C.I. Solvent Red I, C.I. 12150, Ceres Red G, Fat Red BG, Fat Red G. Lacquer Red V2G, Oil Pink, Oil Scarlet 389, Oil Vermilion, Oil Red G, Oleal Red G, Plastoresin Red FR, Red GD, Resinol Red G, Silotras Red TG, Solvent Red 1, Sudan R, and amethoxybenzenazo-β-naphthol (MBN).

== Toxicity & Safety Issues ==
According to European Food Safety Authority, Sudan Red G is considered genotoxic and/or carcinogenic.
