= AN-M8 smoke grenade =

Type of Infantry grenade

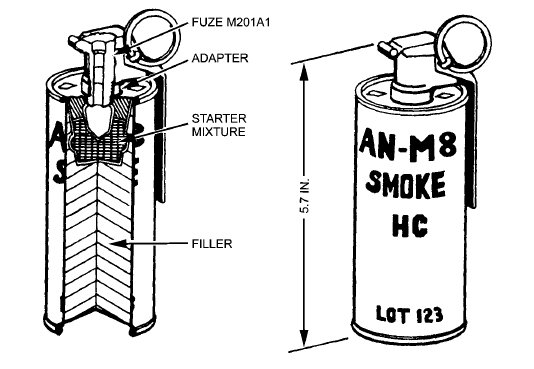
Drawing of AN-M8 smoke grenade

The AN-M8 HC Smoke Grenade, designated as the Army/Navy Model 8 HC Smoke Grenade (AN-M8 Smoke HC) is a US military grenade used as a ground-to-ground obscuring or screening device or a ground-to-air signaling or target-marking device.

== History ==
Developed in the 1940s, using a sheet-steel cylinder body that can emit a dense cloud of white smoke that would last from 105 to 150 seconds.

The AN-M8 was used extensively by American or other allied forces throughout World War II to the 1990s.

As of the September 2000 version of FM 3-23.30 Grenades and Pyrotechnic Signals, the AN/M8 was listed as obsolete.

== Details ==
It is used for smoke screening, target marking, and signalling, although the M18 colored smoke grenades are mainly used for the latter.

Army/Navy Model 8 HC Smoke Grenade (AN-M8)
Color/Markings	light green body with black markings and a white top
Body	Sheet steel cylinder
Fuze assembly	M201A1 Pull-ring Igniter. A "mouse trap" type igniting fuze with a 1.2 to 2.0 second delay. Ignition ignites the filler and expels it from the grenade body
Filler	19 ounces of Type C, hexachloroethane (HC smoke) mixture
Weight	24 ounces (680 g)
Safety clip?	No
Range	Can be thrown 30 feet by an average soldier before it ignites. It can be thrown further while igniting in flight
Duration	The grenade emits a dense cloud of white or gray smoke that lasts for 105 to 150 seconds (1.75 to 2.5 minutes)

=== Warning ===
1. The AN-M8 hand grenade produces harmful hydrochloric fumes that irritate the eyes, throat, and lungs. It should not be used in closed-in areas unless the users are wearing protective masks.
2. Both the AN-M8 and the M18 risk starting a fire if used in a dry area. The steel casing, heated by the smoke-generating chemical reaction, can ignite flammable materials like trash or dry vegetation.

=== Field Instructional Use ===
When employing the M18 or AN-M8 HC hand grenade, it may be desirable to use one of these grenades without the fuze. To do this, the following procedure should be used in combat only:

1. Remove the tape from grenade bottom to expose the filler.
2. Remove the fuze by unscrewing it from the grenade.
3. Ignite starter mixture with open flame.
4. Immediately throw the grenade to avoid burn injury.

=== Toxicity ===
The HC smoke of the M8 is more toxic than that of the M18 grenade. The fumes comprise an acidic smoke of zinc chloride (ZnCl_{2}), which produces hydrochloric acid on contact with water.

== Variants ==
=== M83 ===
The M83 (also written AN/M83) is a modernized version of the M8, using TA (Terephthalic Acid) instead of HC as the filler mixture. This is the American M83, a carrier, Smoke, striker-release, burning type, hand Grenade, used to generate white Smoke for screening activities of small units, also used for Ground-to-Air signalling, that produces a cloud of Smoke for 25 to 70 seconds.

"It also features a new body, though it uses the same fuze as the AN-M8.

Originally designed in the 1990s purely for use as a training Grenade, it has since started to replace the AN-M8 in combat."

=== Model 308-1 White Smoke ===
The Model 308-1 White Smoke was a modified version of the M8 produced at the Special Operations Branch of the Naval Weapons Center at China Lake California, often simply referred to as China Lake. The Model 308-1 was modified for a US Navy SEAL requirement with a greater burning rate, meaning a greater smoke output but a shorter overall burning time.

== See also ==
- M18 colored smoke grenades
- M83 White Smoke Grenade
