= M34 grenade =

M34
- Type: Hand grenade
- Place of origin: United States

Service history
- Used by: See Users
- Wars: Vietnam War; Persian Gulf War

Specifications
- Mass: 27 oz (770 g)
- Length: 5.5 in
- Diameter: 2.375 in (60.3 mm)
- Effective firing range: 30 meters (thrown by average soldier)
- Filling: White phosphorus
- Filling weight: 15 oz (430 g)
- Detonation mechanism: Pyrotechnic delay M206A2 fuse—4 seconds
- Blast yield: Burst Radius of 34 meters (note: less than average range, hence cover required or extreme caution needed)

The M34 white phosphorus smoke grenade was a smoke / incendiary grenade manufactured by Rocky Mountain Arsenal from the late 1950s and used by U.S. forces during the Vietnam War and was also used during the First Gulf War.

== History ==
The M34 WP Grenade replaced the World War II M15 WP grenade.

== Design ==
The M34 had a prescored cylindrical steel body with a conical base designed for compatibility with the M1 rifle grenade adapter using M195 blanks for the M7 launcher or any 22mm NATO diameter rifle/carbine barrels.

The M34 contained 15 ounces of white phosphorus with a small bursting charge to rupture the body and dispense the WP, which would ignite when it came in contact with air. When detonated the body simply split open. The M34 used an M206A2 Fuse. Overall the grenade weighed a total of 27 ounces.

The M34 could be used for target marking, screening (it created a rapidly developing smoke screen), or clearing fortifications, rooms, and other enclosures. It could not be thrown as far as fragmentation grenades owing to its weight and stray burning WP gobs and particles could be blown back on friendly troops.

The M34 could be fired from a rifle grenade launcher using M2-series grenade launching adapters due to the groove around the tapered base, which allowed the adapter arms to grasp it. In contrast, the M15 could not be fired as a rifle grenade.

The M34 had a segmented body to allow for a better hand grip and to identify it as a casualty-producing grenade, even though fragmentation was not its primary damage mechanism. The smooth-bodied M15 was sometimes assumed to be a burning-type smoke grenade, and this sometimes resulted in injuries.

Grenades manufactured prior to the adoption of NATO STANAG 2321 in 1987 (which standardized ammunition color coding for rounds larger than 20mm) had a light gray body, yellow band, and black markings.

Later STANAG-compliant grenades were light green (indicating a smoke / marker round) with a yellow band (indicating they contain an explosive charge), and red markings.

== Users ==
- Australia
- New Zealand
- Philippines
- South Vietnam
- United States
