= No 77 grenade =

No. 77 Mk. 1 white phosphorus hand grenade
- Type: Hand grenade
- Place of origin: United Kingdom

Service history
- Wars: World War II

Production history
- Variants: Mark 1 WP, Mark 2

Specifications
- Filling: White phosphorus
- Filling weight: 225 grams (7.9 ounces)

The No. 77 grenade was a British white phosphorus grenade introduced in September 1943 and used during the Second World War.

== Design ==
The No. 77 consisted of around 225 grams (7.9 ounces) of white phosphorus, an impact fuze and a tin casing.

This grenade was fitted with an "all-ways" action impact fuze designed to set the grenade off when it hit a surface - the fuze was called "all-ways" as it was designed to work no matter which way the grenade landed.

Once the grenade exploded, the contents (i.e. the white phosphorus) scattered and ignited as soon as they touched the air. This made the grenade extremely dangerous — hence its usefulness in combat.

== Adoption ==
As well as being issued to the Home Guard, the No. 77 grenade was issued to the British Army.

The No, 77 was intended for laying down smoke screens and as a signalling device. The grenade was also very effective as an anti-personnel, incendiary weapon.

When the war had ended, many of the grenades had become dangerous, due to corroding of the inferior tin plate steel used in the manufacture of the grenade bodies. In 1948 the grenade was determined to be obsolete and all were destroyed to minimize the danger they could cause.

However, these were produced and used in Canada until the 1950s, for the quality and manufacturing of them was better than found in Britain.

Denmark used the No 77 as the Nr.77 (Danish: Røghåndbombe Nr.77) as the Dutch also employed the No. 77 (Dutch: No. 77 Rookhandgranaat).

References to the No. 77 smoke grenade could also still be found in Dutch army manuals up to the fifties, coded as "C-hgr Nr 77" (Dutch: Chemische handgranaat nummer 77) indicating its use up to that decade in Western Europe.

== Users ==
- Canada
- Denmark
- Netherlands
- United Kingdom
