= Aniline Yellow =

- Skeletal formula

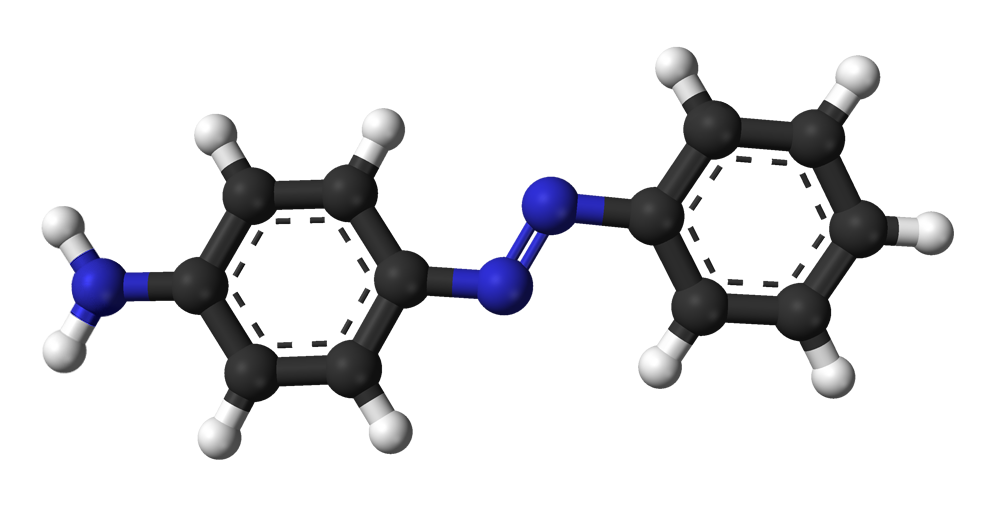
- Ball-and-stick model

Names
- Preferred IUPAC name 4-(Phenyldiazenyl)aniline
- Other names para-Aminoazobenzene; 4-Phenylazoaniline; AAB; Brasilazina oil Yellow G Ceres Yellow; Fast spirit Yellow; Induline R Oil Yellow AAB; Oil Yellow AN; Oil Yellow B Oil Yellow 2G; Oil Yellow R Organol Yellow; Organol Yellow 2A; Solvent Yellow; Somalia Yellow 2G; Stearix Brown 4R; Sudan Yellow R Sudan Yellow RA; C.I. 11000

Identifiers
CAS Number	60-09-3
3D model (JSmol)	Interactive image
ChEBI	CHEBI:233869
ChEMBL	ChEMBL83761
ChemSpider	5828
ECHA InfoCard	100.000.412
EC Number	200-453-6
KEGG	C19187
PubChem CID	6051
UNII	57X2AH42T1
CompTox Dashboard (EPA)	DTXSID40859039 DTXSID6024460, DTXSID40859039
- InChI: InChI=1S/C12H11N3/c13-10-6-8-12(9-7-10)15-14-11-4-2-1-3-5-11/h1-9H,13H2/b15-14+ Key: QPQKUYVSJWQSDY-CCEZHUSRSA-N; InChI=1/C12H11N3/c13-10-6-8-12(9-7-10)15-14-11-4-2-1-3-5-11/h1-9H,13H2/b15-14+ Key: QPQKUYVSJWQSDY-CCEZHUSRBB
- SMILES: N(=N/c1ccc(N)cc1)\c2ccccc2

Properties
Chemical formula	C_{6}H_{5}N=NC_{6}H_{4}NH_{2} (C_{12}H_{11}N_{3})
Molar mass	197.24 g/mol
Density	1.19 g/mL
Melting point	123 to 126 °C (253 to 259 °F; 396 to 399 K)
Boiling point	> 360 °C (680 °F; 633 K)
Acidity (pK_{a})	2.82 (25 ºC)
Magnetic susceptibility (χ)	−118.3·10^{−6} cm^{3}/mol

Hazards
- Occupational safety and health (OHS/OSH)
Main hazards	Highly toxic Suspected carcinogen
- GHS labelling
Pictograms	(GHS08: Health hazard) (GHS09: Environmental hazard)
Signal word	Danger
NFPA 704 (fire diamond)	0 2 1
- Lethal dose or concentration (LD, LC)
LD_{50} (median dose)	200 mg/kg (mouse)
- Except where otherwise noted, data are given for materials in their standard state (at 25 °C [77 °F], 100 kPa). verify (what is ?) Infobox references

Aniline Yellow is a yellow azo dye and an aromatic amine. It is a derivative of azobenzene. It has the appearance of an orange powder. Aniline Yellow was the first azo dye. It was first produced in 1861 by C. Mene. The second azo dye was Bismarck Brown in 1863. Aniline Yellow was commercialized in 1864 as the first commercial azo dye, a year after aniline black. It is manufactured from aniline.

== Uses ==
Aniline Yellow is used in microscopy for vital staining, in pyrotechnics for yellow colored smokes, in yellow pigments and inks including inks for inkjet printers. It is also used in insecticides, lacquers, varnishes, waxes, oil stains, and styrene resins. It is also an intermediate in synthesis of other dyes, e.g. chrysoidine, indulines, Solid Yellow, and Acid Yellow.

== Safety ==
Aminoazobenzene compounds are often carcinogenic.

== See also ==
- Direct Yellow 4
- Titan yellow
