= Sudan Yellow 3G =

Names
- IUPAC name 3-Methyl-1-phenyl-4-(phenyldiazenyl)-1H-pyrazol-5(4H)-one
- Other names Solvent Yellow 16; C.I. disperse yellow; C.I. 12700; 4-phenylazo-1-phenyl-3-methyl-5-pyrazolone; 2,4-dihydro-5-methyl-2-phenyl-4-(phenylazo)-3H-pyrazol-3-one

Identifiers
CAS Number	4314-14-1
3D model (JSmol)	Interactive image
ChEMBL	ChEMBL3145171
ChemSpider	14850402
ECHA InfoCard	100.022.119
EC Number	224-330-1
PubChem CID	624132
UNII	N83897KOD7
CompTox Dashboard (EPA)	DTXSID5052098
- InChI: InChI=1S/C16H14N4O/c1-12-15(18-17-13-8-4-2-5-9-13)16(21)20(19-12)14-10-6-3-7-11-14/h2-11,19H,1H3/b18-17+ Key: XOCUHWXGSSSCTJ-ISLYRVAYSA-N; InChI=1/C16H14N4O/c1-12-15(18-17-13-8-4-2-5-9-13)16(21)20(19-12)14-10-6-3-7-11-14/h2-11,19H,1H3/b18-17+ Key: XOCUHWXGSSSCTJ-ISLYRVAYBE
- SMILES: CC=3NN(c1ccccc1)C(=O)C=3/N=N/c2ccccc2

Properties
Chemical formula	C_{16}H_{14}N_{4}O
Molar mass	278.315 g·mol^{−1}
- Except where otherwise noted, data are given for materials in their standard state (at 25 °C [77 °F], 100 kPa). verify (what is ?) Infobox references

Sudan Yellow 3G, also known as Solvent Yellow 16, C.I. disperse yellow and C.I. 12700, is a yellow azo dye. It is soluble in fats and oils.

Sudan Yellow 3G is used as a pigment in cosmetics and printer toners, and as a dye in inks, including inks for inkjet printers. In pyrotechnics, it is used in some yellow colored smokes.
