= Disperse Red 11 =

Chemical compound

Names
- Preferred IUPAC name 1,4-Diamino-2-methoxyanthracene-9,10-dione
- Other names 1,4-Diamino-2-methoxyanthraquinone; C.I. 62015 (Colour index numbers)

Identifiers
| CAS Number | 2872-48-2 |
| 3D model (JSmol) | Interactive image |
| ChemSpider | 16893 |
| ECHA InfoCard | 100.018.822 |
| EC Number | 220-703-8 |
| PubChem CID | 17885 |
| UNII | 1L6QO8D4UP |
| CompTox Dashboard (EPA) | DTXSID1062677 |
- InChI: InChI=1S/C15H12N2O3/c1-20-10-6-9(16)11-12(13(10)17)15(19)8-5-3-2-4-7(8)14(11)18/h2-6H,16-17H2,1H3 Key: TUXJTJITXCHUEL-UHFFFAOYSA-N; InChI=1S/C15H12N2O3/c1-20-10-6-9(16)11-12(13(10)17)15(19)8-5-3-2-4-7(8)14(11)18/h2-6H,16-17H2,1H3
- SMILES: Nc1c(OC)cc(N)c(C(c2ccccc23)=O)c1C3=O

Properties
| Chemical formula | C_{15}H_{12}N_{2}O_{3} |
| Molar mass | 268.272 g·mol^{−1} |

Hazards
- GHS labelling
| Pictograms | (GHS07: Exclamation mark) |
| Signal word | Warning |
| Hazard statements | H302, H315, H317, H319, H335 |
| Precautionary statements | P261, P264, P270, P271, P272, P280, P301+P312, P302+P352, P304+P340, P305+P351+P338, P312, P321, P330, P332+P313, P333+P313, P337+P313, P362, P363, P403+P233, P405, P501 |
- Except where otherwise noted, data are given for materials in their standard state (at 25 °C [77 °F], 100 kPa). Infobox references

Disperse Red 11, or 1,4-diamino-2-methoxyanthraquinone, is a red disperse dye derived from anthraquinone. It is water insoluble.

Disperse Red 11 can be used in plastics and textiles industry to dye polyvinylchloride, polyester, polyamide, and polyurethane materials, such as synthetic fibers and foams. It is also used in cosmetics and in some red and violet-red colored smoke formulations.
