= Quinoline Yellow SS =

Quinoline Yellow

Names
- Other names Quinoline Yellow, spirit soluble; Solvent Yellow 33; C.I. Solvent Yellow 33; D&C Yellow #10; Quinoline Yellow A; Quinoline yellow for microscopy; Yellow No. 204; C.I. 47000

Identifiers
CAS Number	8003-22-3
3D model (JSmol)	Interactive image
Beilstein Reference	1536880
ChEBI	CHEBI:53700
ChemSpider	6475
ECHA InfoCard	100.029.378
EC Number	83-08-9
PubChem CID	6731
UNII	44F3HYL954
CompTox Dashboard (EPA)	DTXSID00873130 DTXSID7024906, DTXSID00873130
- InChI: InChI=1S/C18H11NO2/c20-17-12-6-2-3-7-13(12)18(21)16(17)15-10-9-11-5-1-4-8-14(11)19-15/h1-10,16H Key: IZMJMCDDWKSTTK-UHFFFAOYSA-N
- SMILES: O=C(c3ccccc3C4=O)/C4=C2Nc1ccccc1C=C\2

Properties
Chemical formula	C_{18}H_{11}NO_{2}
Molar mass	273.29 g/mol
Appearance	Yellow powder
Density	1.34 g/cm^{3}
Melting point	240 °C (464 °F; 513 K)
Solubility in water	Insoluble

Hazards
- GHS labelling
Pictograms	(GHS07: Exclamation mark)
Signal word	Warning
Hazard statements	H315, H319, H335
Precautionary statements	P261, P264, P271, P280, P302+P352, P304+P340, P305+P351+P338, P312, P321, P332+P313, P337+P313, P362, P403+P233, P405, P501
- Except where otherwise noted, data are given for materials in their standard state (at 25 °C [77 °F], 100 kPa). verify (what is ?) Infobox references

Quinoline Yellow SS is a bright yellow dye with green shade. It is insoluble in water, but soluble in nonpolar organic solvents. Quinoline yellow is representative of a large class of quinophthalone pigments. It is suggested that quinoline yellow exhibits excited-state intramolecular proton transfer (ESIPT) behavior and the behavior might be the cause of its decent photostability, by recent spectroscopic study.

== Synthesis and reactions ==
As first described in 1878, the dye is prepared by the fusion of phthalic anhydride and quinaldine. The compound exists as a mixture of two tautomers. Using other anhydrides and other quinaldine derivatives other dyes in the quinophthalone family can be prepared.

When sulfonated, it converts to a water-soluble derivative, Quinoline Yellow WS.

== Uses and safety ==
Quinoline Yellow SS is used in spirit lacquers, polystyrene, polycarbonates, polyamides, acrylic resins, and to color hydrocarbon solvents. It is also used in externally applied drugs and cosmetics. Quinoline Yellow SS is used in some yellow colored smoke formulations.

It may cause contact dermatitis. It has the appearance of a yellow powder with a melting point of 240 °C (464 °F).
