= Composition of electronic cigarette aerosol =

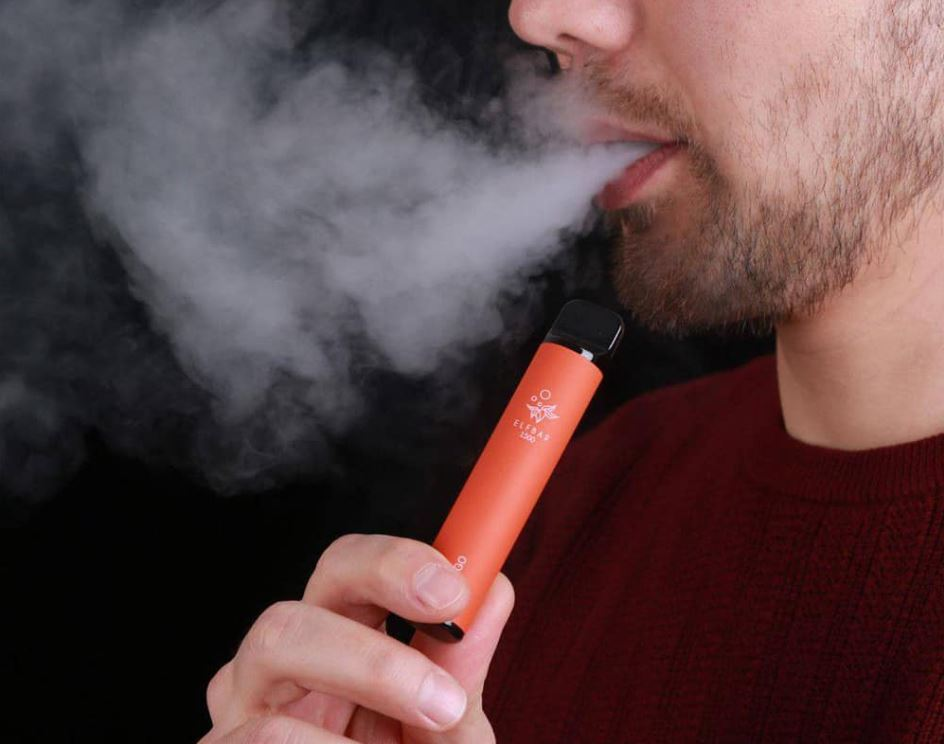
Aerosol (vapor) exhaled by an e-cigarette user

The chemical composition of the electronic cigarette aerosol varies across and within manufacturers. (Note: A 2014 review found "Wide ranges in the levels of chemical substances such as tobacco-specific nitrosamines, aldehydes, metals, volatile organic compounds, phenolic compounds, polycyclic aromatic hydrocarbons, flavours, solvent carriers, tobacco alkaloids and drugs have been reported in e-cigarette refill solutions, cartridges, aerosols and environmental emissions.") Limited data exists regarding their chemistry. However, researchers at Johns Hopkins University analyzed the vape clouds of popular brands such as Juul and Vuse, and found "nearly 2,000 chemicals, the vast majority of which are unidentified."

The aerosol of e-cigarettes is generated when the e-liquid comes in contact with a coil heated to a temperature of roughly 100–250 °C (212–482 °F) within a chamber, which is thought to cause pyrolysis of the e-liquid and could also lead to decomposition of other liquid ingredients. (Note: A 2014 review found "there is enough heat generated during puffing to cause the fluid to decompose and/or components of the device to pyrolyze, whereby toxic/carcinogenic substances may be formed.") The aerosol (mist) produced by an e-cigarette is commonly but inaccurately called vapor. (Note: The term vapor is a misnomer due to the fact that the aerosol generated by e-cigarettes has both a particulate and gas phase.) E-cigarettes simulate the action of smoking, but without tobacco combustion. The e-cigarette aerosol looks like cigarette smoke to some extent. E-cigarettes do not produce aerosol between puffs. The e-cigarette aerosol usually contains propylene glycol, glycerin, nicotine, flavors, aroma transporters, and other substances. (Note: E-cigarette aerosol is composed of droplets of e-liquids, which contain mainly propylene glycol, glycerin, nicotine, water, flavorings (if added to e-liquid), preservatives and also small amounts of by-products of thermal decomposition of some of these constituents.) The levels of nicotine, tobacco-specific nitrosamines (TSNAs), aldehydes, metals, volatile organic compounds (VOCs), flavors, and tobacco alkaloids in e-cigarette aerosols vary greatly. The yield of chemicals found in the e-cigarette aerosol varies depending on, several factors, including the e-liquid contents, puffing rate, and the battery voltage. (Note: A 2017 review found "The physical composition of the aerosol can be altered by many factors: the temperature of the metal coil, rate of e-liquid flow through the heated coil, chemical composition of the coil, the coil connection to the power source, the wicking material transporting e-liquid and the hot aerosol contacts.")

Metal parts of e-cigarettes in contact with the e-liquid can contaminate it with metals. Heavy metals and metal nanoparticles have been found in tiny amounts in the e-cigarette aerosol. (Note: A 2017 review found "As e-cig metal components undergo repeated cycles of heating and cooling, traces of these metal components can leech into the e-liquid, causing the device to emit metallic nanoparticles.") Once aerosolized, the ingredients in the e-liquid go through chemical reactions that form new compounds not previously found in the liquid. Many chemicals, including carbonyl compounds such as formaldehyde, can inadvertently be produced when the nichrome wire (heating element) that touches the e-liquid is heated and chemically reacted with the liquid. Propylene glycol-containing liquids produced the most amounts of carbonyls in e-cigarette vapors, while in 2014 most e-cigarettes companies began using water and glycerin instead of propylene glycol for vapor production.

Propylene glycol and glycerin are oxidized to create aldehydes that are also found in cigarette smoke when e-liquids are heated and aerosolized at a voltage higher than 3 V. Depending on the heating temperature, the carcinogens in the e-cigarette aerosol may surpass the levels of cigarette smoke. Reduced voltage e-cigarettes generate very low levels of formaldehyde. A Public Health England (PHE) report found "At normal settings, there was no or negligible formaldehyde release." However, this statement was contradicted by other researchers in a 2018 study. E-cigarettes can emit formaldehyde at high levels (between five and 15 times higher than what is reported for cigarette smoke) at moderate temperatures and under conditions that have been reported to be non-averse to users. As e-cigarette engineering evolves, the later-generation and "hotter" devices could expose users to greater amounts of carcinogens.

== Use ==
This flowchart diagrams the basic actions and functions to generate e-cigarette aerosol.

== Background ==
There is a debate on the composition, and the subsequent health burden, of tobacco smoke compared with electronic cigarette vapor. Tobacco smoke is a complex, dynamic and reactive mixture containing around 5,000 chemicals. In 2021, researchers at Johns Hopkins University analyzed the vape aerosols of popular brands such as Juul and Vuse, and found "nearly 2,000 chemicals, the vast majority of which are unidentified." E-cigarette vapor contains many of the known harmful toxicants found in traditional cigarette smoke, such as formaldehyde, cadmium, and lead, though usually at a reduced percentage.

There are substances in e-cigarette vapor that are not found in tobacco smoke. Researchers are part of the conflict, with some opposing and others supporting of e-cigarette use. The public health community is divided, even polarized, over how the use of these devices will impact the tobacco epidemic. Some proponents of e-cigarettes think that these devices contain merely "water vapour" in the e-cigarette aerosols, but this view is refuted by the evidence.

List of hazardous tobacco smoke components with their cancer and non-cancer inhalation risk values.
Smoke component	Cancer risk (mg m^{−3}) (Note: Cancer inhalation risk values provide an excess lifetime exposure risk, in this case the human lung cancer risk at a 1 in 100,000 (E-5) level.)	Institute	Non-cancer risk (mg m^{−3}) (Note: Noncancer inhalation risk values indicate levels and exposure times at which no adverse effect is expected; here values for continuous lifetime exposure are listed.)	Endpoint	Institute
1,1,1-Trichloro-2,2-bis(4-chlorophenyl)ethane (DDT)	0.0001	U.S. EPA			
1,1-Dimethylhydrazine	2E-06	ORNL			
1,3-Butadiene	0.0003	U.S. EPA	0.002	reproduction	U.S. EPA
2,3,7,8-Tetrachlorodibenzo-p-dioxin (TCDD)	0.00026	Cal EPA			
2-Amino-3-methyl-9H-pyrido[2,3-b]indole (MeAaC)	2.9E-05	Cal EPA			
2-Amino-3-methylimidazo[4,5-b]quinoline (IQ)	2.5E-05	Cal EPA			
2-Amino-6-methyl[1,2-a:3′,2″-d]imidazole (GLu-P-1)	7.1E-06	Cal EPA			
2-Aminodipyrido[1,2-a:3′,2″-d]imidazole (GLu-P-2)	2.5E-05	Cal EPA			
2-Aminonaphthalene	2E-05	Cal EPA			
2-Nitropropane		Cal EPA	0.02	liver, focal vacuolization and nodules	U.S. EPA
2-Toluidine	0.0002	Cal EPA			
3-Amino-1,4-dimethyl-5H-pyrido [4,3-b]indole (Trp-P-1)	1.4E-06	Cal EPA			
3-Amino-1-methyl-5H-pyrido[4,3-b]-indole (Trp-P-2)	1.1E-05	Cal EPA			
4-Aminobiphenyl	1.7E-06	Cal EPA			
5-Methylchrysene	9.1E-06	Cal EPA			
7H-Dibenzo(c,g)carbazole	9.1E-06	Cal EPA			
2-Amino-9H-pyrido[2,3-b]indole (AaC)	8.8E-05	Cal EPA			
Acetaldehyde	0.0045	U.S. EPA	0.009	nasal olfactory epithelial lesions	U.S. EPA
Acetamide	0.0005	Cal EPA			
Acetone			30	neurological effects	ATSDR
Acetonitrile			0.06	mortality	U.S. EPA
Acrolein			2E-05	nasal lesions	U.S. EPA
Acrylamide	0.008				
Acrylic acid			0.001	nasal olfactory epithelium degeneration	U.S. EPA
Acrylonitrile	0.00015	U.S. EPA	0.002	respiratory effects	U.S. EPA
Ammonia			0.1	respiratory effects	U.S. EPA
Aniline	B2—probable human carcinogen	U.S. EPA	0.001	immune-related	U.S. EPA
Arsenic	2.3E-06	U.S. EPA			
Benz[a]anthracene	9.1E-05	Cal EPA			
Benzene	0.0013	U.S. EPA	0.0098	decreased lymphocyte count	ATSDR
Benzo[a]pyrene	9.1E-06	Cal EPA			
Benzo[j]fluoranthene	9.1E-05	Cal EPA			
Beryllium	4.2E-06				
Cadmium	5.6E-06	U.S. EPA			
Carbazole	0.0018	NATA			
Carbon disulfide			0.1	effects on CNS	HC
Carbon monoxide			10	cardiotoxic	Cal EPA
Chloroform	0.00043	U.S. EPA	0.1	liver changes	ATSDR
Chromium VI	8.3E-07	U.S. EPA	0.0001	lower respiratory effects	U.S. EPA
Chrysene	0.00091	Cal EPA			
Cobalt			0.0005	respiratory functions	RIVM
Copper			0.001	lung and immune system effects	RIVM
Di(2-ethylhexyl) phthalate	0.0042	Cal EPA			
Dibenzo[a,i]pyrene	9.1E-07	Cal EPA			
Dibenzo[a,h]acridine	9.1E-05	Cal EPA			
Dibenzo[a,h]anthracene	8.3E-06	Cal EPA			
Dibenzo[a,j]acridine	9.1E-05	Cal EPA			
Dibenzo[a,h]pyrene	9.1E-07	Cal EPA			
Dibenzo[a,l]pyrene	9.1E-07	Cal EPA			
Dibenzo[a,e]pyrene	9.1E-06	Cal EPA			
Dibenzo[c,g]carbazole	9.1E-06	Cal EPA			
Dimethylformamide			0.03	digestive disturbances; minimal hepatic changes	U.S. EPA
Ethyl carbamate	3.5E-05	Cal EPA			
Ethylbenzene			0.77	liver and kidney effects	RIVM
Ethylene oxide	0.00011	Cal EPA			
Ethylenethiourea	0.00077	Cal EPA			
Formaldehyde	0.00077	U.S. EPA	0.01	nasal irritation	ATSDR
Hexane			0.7	neurotoxicity	U.S. EPA
Hydrazine	2E-06	U.S. EPA	0.005	fatty liver changes	ATSDR
Hydrogen cyanide			0.003	CNS and thyroid effects	U.S. EPA
Hydrogen sulfide			0.002	nasal lesions	U.S. EPA
Indeno[1,2,3-c,d]pyrene	9.1E-05	Cal EPA			
Isopropylbenzene			0.4	increased kidney, adrenal gland weights	U.S. EPA
Lead	0.00083	Cal EPA	0.0015	not applicable	U.S. EPA
Manganese			5E-05	neurobehavioral	U.S. EPA
m-Cresol			0.17	CNS	RIVM
Mercury			0.0002	nervous system	U.S. EPA
Methyl chloride			0.09	cerebellar lesions	U.S. EPA
Methyl ethyl ketone			5	developmental toxicity	U.S. EPA
Naphthalene			0.003	nasal effects	U.S. EPA
N-nitrosodi-n-butylamine (NBUA)	6.3E-06	U.S. EPA			
N-nitrosodimethylamine (NDMA)	7.1E-07	U.S. EPA			
Nickel			9E-05	chronic active inflammation and lung fibrosis	ATSDR
Nitrogen dioxide			0.1	not applicable	U.S. EPA
N-nitrosodiethanolamine	1.3E-05	Cal EPA			
N-nitrosodiethylamine	2.3E-07	U.S. EPA			
N-nitrosoethylmethylamine	1.6E-06	Cal EPA			
N-Nitrosonornicotine (NNN)	2.5E-05	Cal EPA			
N-Nitroso-N-propylamine	5E-06	Cal EPA			
N-nitrosopiperidine	3.7E-06	Cal EPA			
N-nitrosopyrrolidine	1.6E-05	U.S. EPA			
n-Propylbenzene			0.4	increased organ weight	U.S. EPA
o-Cresol	C- possible human carcinogen	U.S. EPA	0.17	decreased body weight, neurotoxicity	RIVM
p-, m-Xylene			0.1	respiratory, neurological, developmental	U.S. EPA
p-Benzoquinone	C- possible human carcinogen	U.S. EPA	0.17	CNS	RIVM
p-Cresol	C- possible human carcinogen	U.S. EPA	0.17	CNS	RIVM
Phenol			0.02	liver enzymes, lungs, kidneys, and cardiovascular system	RIVM
Polonium-210	925.9	ORNL (Note: Unit risk in risk/pCi = 1.08E-08.)			
Propionaldehyde			0.008	atrophy of olfactory epithelium	U.S. EPA
Propylene oxide	0.0027	U.S. EPA			
Pyridine			0.12	odour threshold	RIVM
Selenium			0.0008	respiratory effects	Cal EPA
Styrene			0.092	body weight changes and neurotoxic effects	HC
Toluene			0.3	colour vision impairment	ATSDR
Trichloroethylene	82	HC	0.2	liver, kidney, CNS effects	RIVM
Triethylamine			0.007	n.a.	U.S. EPA
Vinyl acetate			0.2	nasal lesions	U.S. EPA
Vinyl chloride	0.0011	U.S. EPA			

== Particulate matter ==
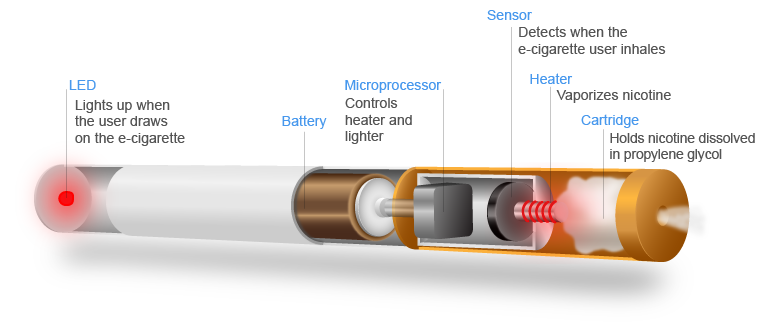
The engineering design of an e-cigarette

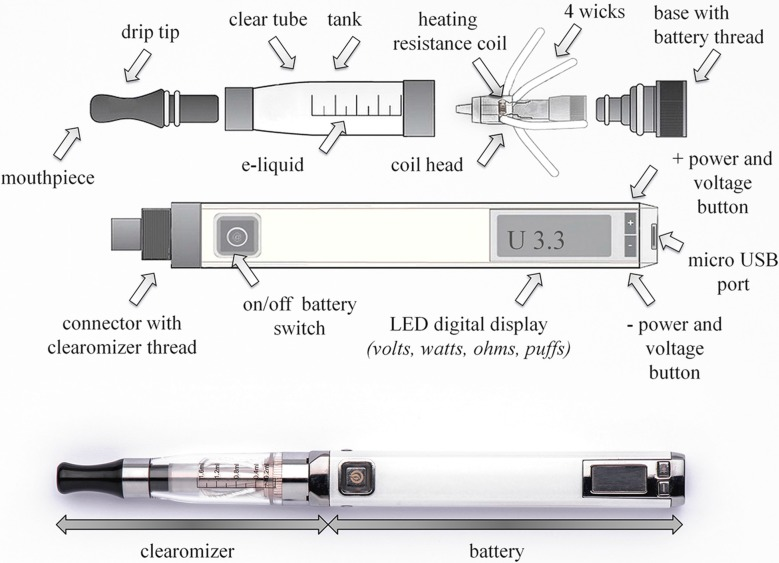
An exploded view of an e-cigarette with a transparent clearomizer and changeable dual-coil head. This model allows for a wide range of settings.

Electronic cigarette aerosol contains fine and ultrafine particles of particulate matter, including particulate matter 2.5 μm or smaller in diameter (PM_{2.5}). Studies have found that electronic cigarette aerosol can raise PM2.5 concentrations to several hundred micrograms per cubic meter (μg/m³), with measurements of 600–800 μg/m³ in vape shops and conventions and peak values exceeding 1,000 μg/m³; these levels are far above typical indoor backgrounds (8–52 μg/m³) and greatly exceed the World Health Organization’s 24‑hour PM2.5 guideline of 25 μg/m³ for outdoor air. PM2.5 is capable of penetrating deep into the lungs and entering the bloodstream, where it is associated with severe systemic inflammation, cardiovascular disease, and premature death.

=== Pathogens ===
E-liquid used in e-cigarettes has been found to be contaminated with fungi and bacteria. Nicotine-containing e-liquids are extracted from tobacco that may contain impurities. Tobacco-specific impurities such as cotinine, nicotine-N'-oxides (cis and trans isomers), and beta-nornicotyrine are believed to be the result of bacterial action or oxidation during the extraction of nicotine from tobacco.

==== Re-used vapes, and vape sharing ====
- Bacterial pneumonia.
- Fungal pneumonia
- Viral pneumonia from vape sharing.
  - SARS-CoV-2: Shared vaping devices are linked to COVID-19.

=== Chemicals ===
E-cigarette components include a mouthpiece, a cartridge (liquid storage area), a heating element or atomizer, a microprocessor, a battery, and some of them have a LED light at the tip. They are disposable or reusable devices. Disposable ones are not rechargeable and typically cannot be refilled with a liquid. There is a diverse range of disposable and reusable devices, resulting in broad variations in their structure and their performance. Since many devices include interchangeable components, users have the ability to alter the nature of the inhaled vapor.

For the majority of e-cigarettes, many aspects are similar to their traditional counterparts, such as giving nicotine to the user. The use of an e-cigarette simulates the action of smoking, with a vapor that somewhat resembles cigarette smoke. E-cigarettes do not involve tobacco combustion, and they do not produce vapor between puffs. They do not produce sidestream smoke or sidestream vapor.

Vapor production basically entails preprocessing, vapor generation, and postprocessing. First, the e-cigarette is activated by pressing a button, or other devices switch on by an airflow sensor or other type of trigger sensor. Then, power is released to an LED, other sensors, and other parts of the device, and to a heating element or other kind of vapor generator. Subsequently, the e-liquid flows by capillary action to the heating element or other devices to the e-cigarette vapor generator. Second, the e-cigarette vapor processing entails vapor generation.

The e-cigarette vapor is generated when the e-liquid is vaporized by the heating element or by other mechanical methods. The last step of vapor processing happens as the e-cigarette vapor passes through the main air passage to the user. For some advanced devices, before inhaling, the user can adjust the heating element temperature, air flow rate or other features. The liquid within the chamber of an e-cigarette is heated to roughly 100-250 °C to create an aerosolized vapor. This is thought to result in pyrolysis of the e-liquid and could also lead to decomposition of other liquid ingredients. The aerosol (mist) produced by an e-cigarette is commonly but inaccurately called vapor. In physics, a vapor is a substance in the gas phase whereas an aerosol is a suspension of tiny particles of liquid, solid or both within a gas.

The power output of the e-cigarette is correlated to the voltage and resistance (P = V^{2}/R, in watts), which is one aspect that impacts the production and the amount of toxicants of e-cigarette vapors. The power generated by the heating coil is not based solely on the voltage because it also relies upon the current, and the resultant temperature of the e-liquid relies upon the power output of the heating element. The production of vapor also relies upon the boiling point of the solvent. Propylene glycol boils at 188 °C, while glycerin boils at 290 °C. The higher temperature reached by glycerin may impact the toxicants emitted by the e-cigarette. The boiling point for nicotine is 247 °C. Each e-cigarette company's designs generate different amounts of heating power.

The evidence indicates that larger capacity tanks, increasing the coil temperature, and dripping configurations seem to be end-user-modified designs adopted by e-cigarette companies. Variable voltage e-cigarettes can raise the temperature within the device to allow users to adjust the e-cigarette vapor. No firm information is available on the temperature differences in variable voltage devices. The length of time that the e-cigarette vapor is being heated within the device also affects the e-cigarette vapor properties. When the temperature of the heating element rises, the temperature of the e-cigarette vapor in the air rises. The hotter air can support more e-liquid air density.

E-cigarettes have a wide array of engineering designs. The differences in e-cigarette manufacturing materials are broad and often unknown. Concern exists over lack of quality control. E-cigarette companies often lack manufacturing standards or are non-existent. Some e-cigarettes are designed and manufactured to a high standard. The manufactured standards of e-cigarettes are not equivalent to pharmaceutical products. Improved manufacturing standards could reduce the levels of metals and other chemicals found in e-cigarette vapor. Quality control is influenced by market forces.

The engineering designs typically affect the nature, number, and size of particles generated. High amounts of vapor particle deposition are believed to enter into the lungs with each puff because the particle size in e-cigarette vapors is within the respiratory range. After a puff, the inhaled vapor changes in the size distributions of particles in the lungs. This results in smaller exhaled particles. E-cigarette vapor is made up of fine and ultrafine particles of particulate matter. Vaping (Note: The activity of puffing an aerosolized liquid and then exhaling it is known as "vaping".) generates particulate matter 2.5 μm or less in diameter (PM_{2.5}), but at notably less concentrations compared to cigarette smoke. Particle concentrations from vaping ranged from 6.6 to 85.0 μg/m^{3}.

Particle-size distributions of particulate matter from vaping differ across studies. The longer the puff duration the greater the amount of particles produced. The greater the amount of nicotine in the e-liquid the greater the amount of particles produced. Flavoring does not influence the particle emissions. The various kinds of devices such as cig-a-likes, medium-sized vaporizers, tanks, or mods may function at different voltages and temperatures. Thus, the particle size of the e-cigarette vapor can vary, due to the device used. Comparable to cigarette smoke, the particle size distribution mode (Note: Horiba states, "The mode is the peak of the frequency distribution, or it may be easier to visualize it as the highest peak seen in the distribution. The mode represents the particle size (or size range) most commonly found in the distribution.") of e-cigarette vapor ranged from 120 to 165 nm, with some vaping devices producing more particles than cigarette smoke.

==== Ingredients ====
Exactly what the e-cigarette vapor consists of varies in composition and concentration across and within manufacturers. Limited data exists regarding their chemistry. The e-cigarette vapor usually contains propylene glycol, glycerin, nicotine, flavors, aroma transporters, and other substances. The levels of solvents and flavors are not provided on the labels of e-liquids, according to many studies.

The yield of chemicals found in the e-cigarette vapor varies depending on, several factors, including the e-liquid contents, puffing rate, and the battery voltage. A 2017 review found that "Adjusting battery wattage or the inhaled airflow modifies the amount of vapor and chemical density in each puff." A high amount of e-liquid contains propylene glycol and/or glycerin.

Limited but consistent data indicates that flavoring agents are at levels above the National Institute for Occupational Safety and Health safety limit. High amounts of flavoring agents have been found in e-cigarette vapors.

The main chemical found in the e-cigarette vapor was propylene glycol. A 2013 study, under close to real-life conditions in an emission test chamber, using a test subject who took six forceful puffs from an e-cigarette, resulted in a high level of propylene glycol released into the air. The next greatest amount in the e-cigarette vapor was nicotine.

Cig-a-likes are usually first-generation e-cigarettes, tanks are commonly second-generation e-cigarettes, tanks that let vapers adjust the voltage setting are third-generation e-cigarettes, and tanks that have the ability for sub ohm (Ω) vaping and to set temperature control limits are fourth-generation devices. Vaping nicotine using e-cigarettes differs from smoking traditional cigarettes in many ways. First-generation e-cigarettes are often designed to simulate smoking traditional cigarettes; they are low-tech vaporizers with a limited number of settings. First-generation devices usually deliver a smaller amount nicotine. Second-generation and third-generation e-cigarettes use more advanced technology; they have atomizers (i.e., heating coils that convert e-liquids into vapor) which improve nicotine dispersal and house high capacity batteries.

Third-generation and fourth-generation devices represent a diverse set of products and, aesthetically, constitute the greatest departure from the traditional cigarette shape, as many are square or rectangular and feature customizable and rebuildable atomizers and batteries. Cartomizers are similar in design to atomizers; their main difference is a synthetic filler material wrapped around the heating coil. Clearomizers are now commonly available and similar to cartomizers, but they include a clear tank of a larger volume and no filler material; additionally they have a disposable head containing the coil(s) and wicks. Vaping enthusiasts often begin with a cig-a-like first-generation device and tend to move towards using a later-generation device with a larger battery.

Cig-a-likes and tanks are among the most popular devices. But tanks vaporize nicotine more effectively, and there are a greater selection of flavors and levels of nicotine, and are usually used by experienced users. Under five minutes of cig-a-like vaping, blood nicotine levels can elevate to about 5 ng/ml, while under 30 minutes of using 2 mg of nicotine gum, blood nicotine levels ranged from 3–5 ng/ml. Under five minutes of using tank systems by experienced vapers, the elevation in blood nicotine level can be 3–4 times greater.

Many devices lets the user use interchangeable components, which result in variations in the e-cigarette vaporized nicotine. One of the primary features of the more recent generation of devices is that they contain larger batteries and are capable of heating the liquid to a higher temperature, potentially releasing more nicotine, forming additional toxicants, and creating larger clouds of particulate matter. A 2017 review found "Many e-cig users prefer to vape at high temperatures as more aerosol is generated per puff. However, applying a high voltage to a low-resistance heating coil can easily heat e-liquids to temperatures in excess of 300 °C; temperatures sufficient to pyrolyze e-liquid components."

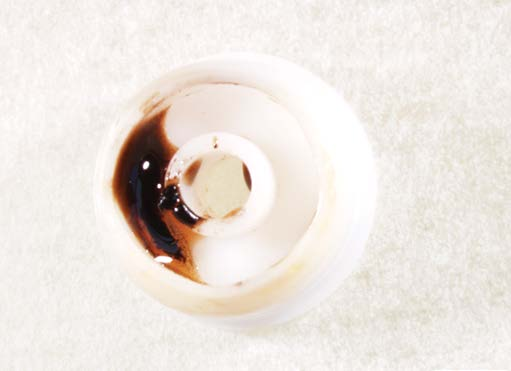
E-cigarette mouthpiece with particles of insoluble apparently thermally decomposed tobacco extract from the aerosol

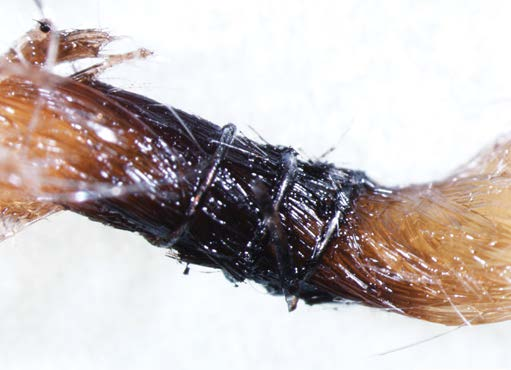
Evidence of thermally decomposed material on the wick (of an e-cigarette) in proximity to the heating element

The nicotine levels in the e-cigarette vapor greatly varies across companies. The nicotine levels in the e-cigarette vapor also varies greatly either from puff-to-puff or among devices of the same company. Nicotine intake across users using same device or liquid varies substantially. Puffing characteristics differ between smoking and vaping. Vaping typically require more 'suck' than cigarette smoking. Factors that influence the level of blood nicotine concentrations include nicotine content in a device; how well the nicotine is vapored from the liquid reservoir; and additives that may contribute to nicotine intake. Nicotine intake from vaping also relies upon the habits of the user.

Other factors that influence nicotine intake include engineering designs, battery power, and vapor pH. For instance, some e-cigarettes have e-liquids that contain amounts of nicotine comparable to other companies, though the e-cigarette vapor contains far less amounts of nicotine. Puffing behavior substantially varies. New e-cigarette users tend to take shorter puffs than experienced users which may result in less nicotine intake. Among experienced users there is a wide range in puffing time. Some experienced users may not adapt to increase their puffing time. Inexperienced users vape less forcefully than experienced users.

E-cigarettes share a common design, but construction variations and user alterations generate varied nicotine delivery. Lowering the heater resistance probably increases the nicotine concentration. Some 3.3 V vaping devices using low-resistance heating elements such as an ohm of 1.5, containing 36 mg/mL liquid nicotine can obtain blood nicotine levels after 10 puffs that may be higher than with traditional cigarettes. A 2015 study evaluated "a variety of factors that can influence nicotine yield and found that increasing power output from 3 to 7.5 W (an approximately 2.5-fold increase), by increasing the voltage from 3.3 to 5.2 V, led to an approximately 4- to 5-fold increase in nicotine yield." A 2015 study, using a model to approximate indoor air workplace exposure, anticipates greatly reduced exposure to nicotine from e-cigarettes than traditional cigarettes.

A 2016 World Health Organization (WHO) report found "nicotine in SHA [second-hand aerosol] has been found between 10 and 115 times higher than in background air levels." A 2015 Public Health England (PHE) report concluded that e-cigarettes "release negligible levels of nicotine into ambient air". A 2016 Surgeon General of the United States report stated that the exposure to nicotine from e-cigarette vaping is not negligible and is higher than in non-smoking environments. Vaping generates more surrounding air levels of particulate matter and nicotine in indoor areas than background air levels. Extended indoor e-cigarette use in rooms that are not sufficiently ventilated could surpass occupational exposure limits to the inhaled metals.

The e-cigarette vapor may also contain tiny amounts of toxicants, carcinogens, and heavy metals. The majority of toxic chemicals found in e-cigarette vapor are below 1% of the corresponding levels permissible by workplace exposure standards, but the threshold limit values for workplace exposure standards are generally much higher than levels considered satisfactory for outdoor air quality. Some chemicals from exposures to the e-cigarette vapor could be higher than workplace exposure standards. A 2018 PHE report stated that the toxicants found in e-cigarette vapor are less than 5% and the majority are less than 1% in comparison with traditional cigarettes.

Although several studies have found lower levels of carcinogens in e-cigarette aerosol compared to smoke emitted by traditional cigarettes, the mainstream and second-hand e-cigarette aerosol has been found to contain at least ten chemicals that are on California's Proposition 65 list of chemicals known to cause cancer, birth defects, or other reproductive harm, including acetaldehyde, benzene, cadmium, formaldehyde, isoprene, lead, nickel, nicotine, N-Nitrosonornicotine, and toluene. Free radicals produced from frequent e-cigarette use is estimated to be greater than compared to air pollution. E-cigarette vapor can contain a range of toxicants, and since they have been be used in methods unintended by the producer such as dripping or mixing liquids, this could result in generating greater levels of toxicants.

"Dripping", where the liquid is dripped directly onto the atomizer, could yield a higher level of nicotine when the liquid contains nicotine, and also a higher level of chemicals may be generated from heating the other contents of the liquid, including formaldehyde. Dripping may result in higher levels of aldehydes. Considerable pyrolysis might occur during dripping. Emissions of certain compounds increased over time during use as a result of increased residues of polymerization by-products around the coil. As the devices age and get dirty, the constituents they produce may become different. Proper cleaning or more routine replacement of coils may lower emissions by preventing buildup of residual polymers.

===== E-liquid carrying agents =====
Glycerin and/or propylene glycol is used in liquid vapes. Vapes for cloud-chasing usually don't contain other ingredients.

====== Glycerin ======
Glycerin (often called vegetable glycerin, or VG) was long thought to be a safe option. However, the carcinogen formaldehyde is known as an impurity found in propylene glycol and glycerol vapor degradation.

====== Propylene glycol ======
Propylene glycol (often referred to as PG).

====== Misc ======
- MCT oil

===== Flavoring =====
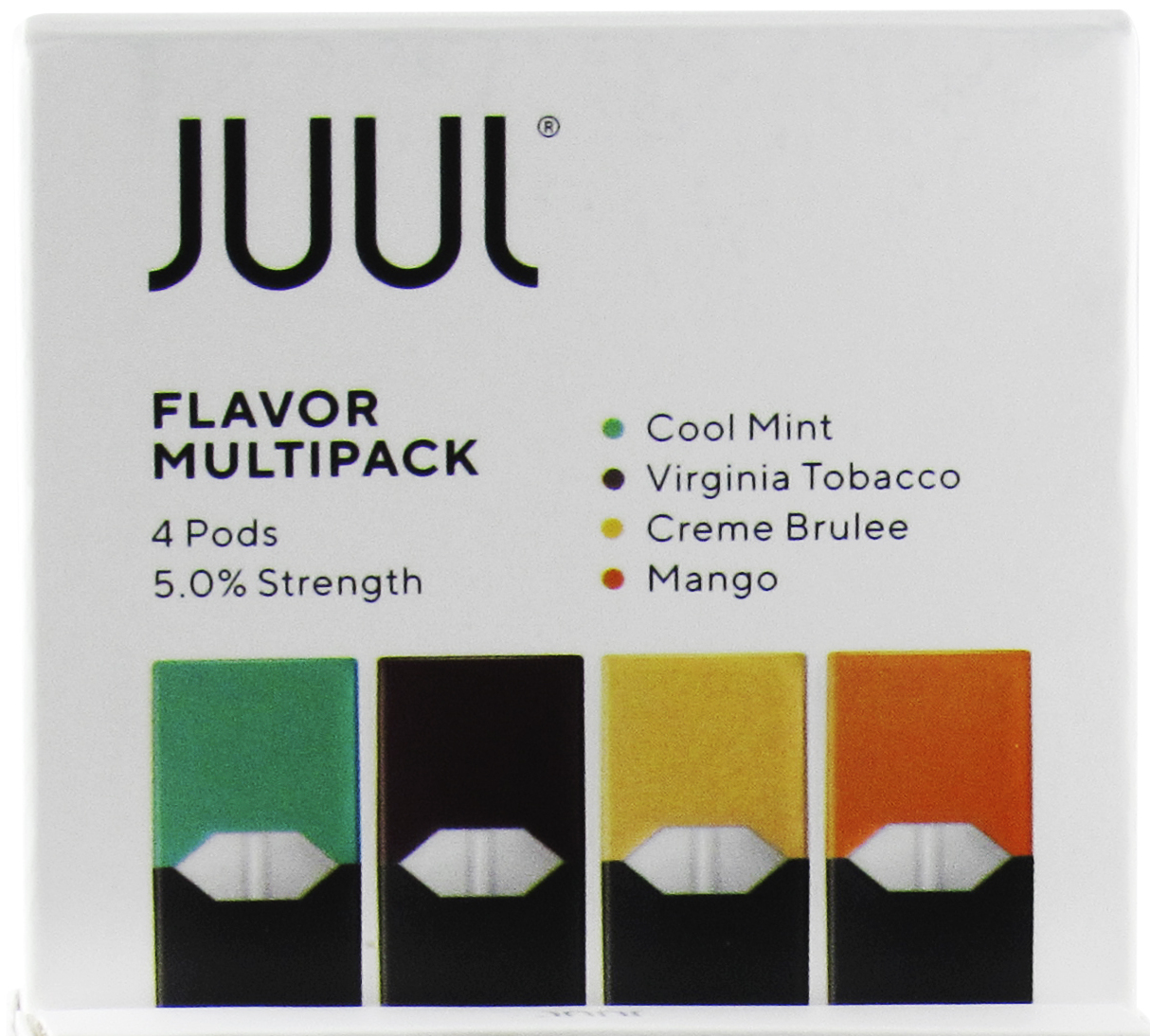
After the FDA investigation on youth vaping, Juul reduced the promotion of some sweet flavors.

Flavoring are often added to e-liquids as well as dry smoke blends. There are currently over 7,700 e-liquid flavors available, most have not been laboratory tested for toxicity.

There are numerous flavors (e.g., fruit, vanilla, caramel, coffee) of e-liquid available. There are also flavorings that resemble the taste of cigarettes.

===== Psychoactive substances =====
====== Cannabinoids ======
CBD is common in vape products. Conversion of CBD to THC can occur when CBD is heated to temperatures between 250 and 300 °C, potentially leading to its partial transformation into THC. CBD is one among the most suspected ingredients involved in VAPI.

Synthetic cannabinoids are increasingly offered in e-cigarette form as "c-liquid".

====== Nicotine ======
The nicotine molecule

E-liquids were purchased from retailers and via online for a 2013 study. The Royal College of General Practitioners stated in 2016 that "To date 42 chemicals have been detected in ENDS aerosol – though with the ENDS market being unregulated there is significant variation between devices and brands."

E-liquid nicotine concentrations vary. The amount of nicotine stated on the labels of e-liquids can be very different from analyzed samples. Some e-liquids sold as nicotine-free contained nicotine, and some of them were at substantial levels. The analyzed liquids nicotine levels were between 14.8 and 87.2 mg/mL and the actual amount varied from the stated amount by as much as 50%.

Possibly, 60–70% of the nicotine is vaporized. E-cigarettes without nicotine is also available. Via nicotine-containing e-cigarettes, nicotine is absorbed through the upper and lower respiratory tract. A greater amount of nicotine is possibly absorbed through oral mucosa and upper airways. The composition of the e-liquid may affect nicotine delivery. E-liquid containing glycerin and propylene glycol delivers nicotine more efficiently than a glycerin-based liquid with the same amount of nicotine. It is believed that propylene glycol vaporizes quicker than glycerin, which subsequently transports a higher amount of nicotine to the user.

Vaping appears to give less nicotine per puff than cigarette smoking. Early devices typically delivered low amounts of nicotine than that of traditional cigarettes, but newer devices containing a high amount of nicotine in the liquid may deliver nicotine at amounts similar to that of traditional cigarettes. Similar to traditional cigarettes, e-cigarettes rapidly delivers nicotine to the brain. The peak concentration of nicotine delivered by e-cigarettes is comparable to that of traditional cigarettes. E-cigarettes take longer to reach peak concentration than with traditional cigarettes, but they provide nicotine to the blood quicker than nicotine inhalers. The yield of nicotine users obtain is similar to that of nicotine inhalers.

Newer e-cigarette models deliver nicotine to the blood quicker than with older devices. E-cigarettes with more powerful batteries can delivery a higher level of nicotine in the e-cigarette vapor. Some research indicates that experienced e-cigarette users can obtain nicotine levels similar to that of smoking. Some vapers (Note: The user is referred to as a "vaper.") can obtain nicotine levels comparable to smoking, and this ability generally improves with experience. E‐cigarettes users still may be able to obtain similar blood nicotine levels compared with traditional cigarettes, particularly with experienced smokers, but it takes more time to obtain such levels.

==== By-products ====
===== Metals and other content =====
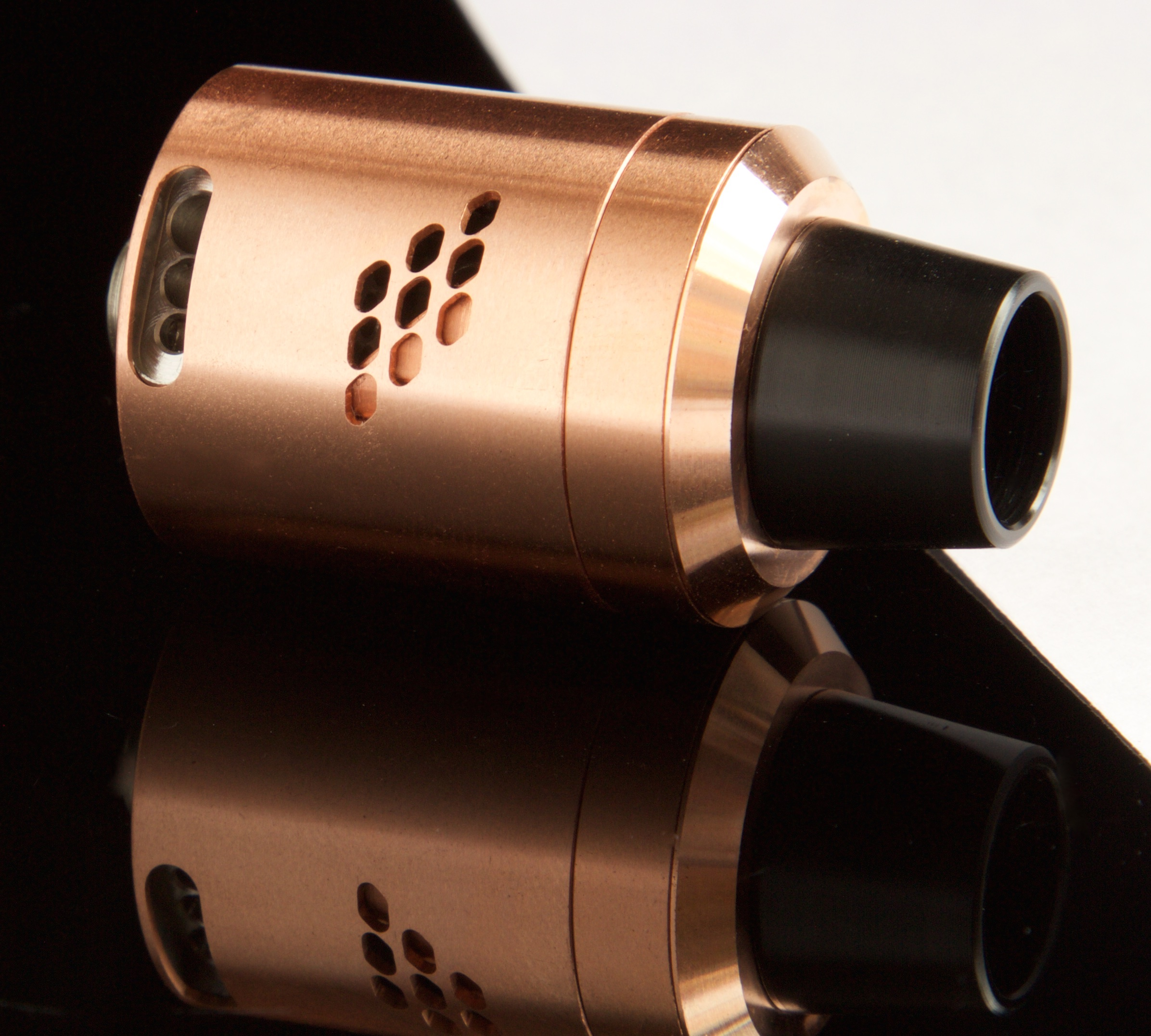
An intact e-cigarette rebuilder atomizer

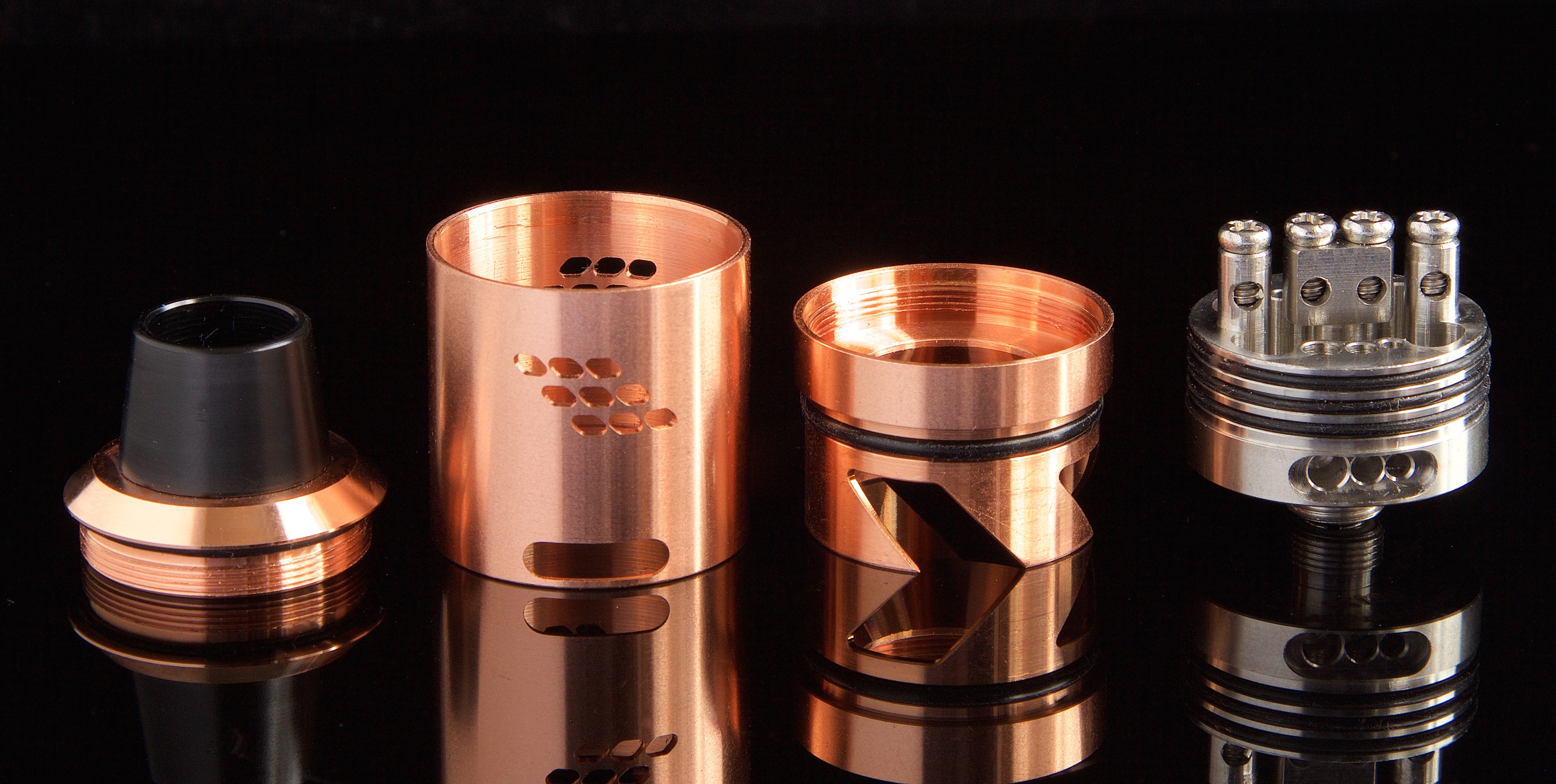
The unassembled components of an e-cigarette rebuilder atomizer

A 2020 systematic review found aluminum, antimony, arsenic, cadmium, cobalt, chromium, copper, iron, lead, manganese, nickel, selenium, tin, and zinc, possibly due to coil contact.

Metal parts of e-cigarettes in contact with the e-liquid can contaminate it. The temperature of the atomizer can reach up to 500 °F. The atomizer contains metals and other parts where the liquid is kept, and an atomizer head is made of a wick and metal coil which heats the liquid. Due to this design, some metals are potentially found in the e-cigarette vapor. E-cigarette devices differ in the amount of metals in the e-cigarette vapor. This may be associated with the age of various cartridges, and also what is contained in the atomizers and coils.

Usage behavior may contribute to variations in the specific metals and amounts of metals found in e-cigarette vapor. An atomizer made of plastics could react with e-liquid and leach plasticizers. The amounts and kinds of metals or other materials found in the e-cigarette vapor is based on the material and other manufacturing designs of the heating element. E-cigarettes devices can be made with ceramics, plastics, rubber, filament fibers, and foams, of which some can be found in the e-cigarette vapor.

E-cigarette parts, including exposed wires, wire coatings, solder joints, electrical connectors, heating element material, and vitreous fiber wick material, account for the second significant source of substances, to which users may be exposed. Metal and silicate particles, some of which are at higher levels than in traditional cigarettes, have been detected in e-cigarette aerosol, resulting from degradation from the metal coil used to heat the solution. Other materials used are Pyrex glass rather than plastics and stainless steel rather than metal alloys.

Metals and metal nanoparticles have been found in tiny amounts in e-cigarette vapor. Aluminum, antimony, barium, boron, cadmium, chromium, copper, iron, lanthanum, lead, magnesium, manganese, mercury, nickel, potassium, silicate, silver, sodium, strontium, tin, titanium, zinc, and zirconium have been found in e-cigarette vapor. Arsenic may leach from the device itself and may end up in the liquid, and then the e-cigarette vapor. Arsenic has been found in some e-liquids, and in e-cigarette vapor.

Considerable differences in exposure to metals have been identified from the e-cigarettes tested, particularly metals such as cadmium, lead, and nickel. Poor quality first-generation e-cigarettes produce several metals in their vapor, in some cases the amounts were greater than with cigarette smoke. A 2013 study found metal particles in the e-cigarette vapor were at concentrations 10-50 times less than permitted in inhalation medicines.

A 2018 study found significantly higher amounts of metals in e-cigarette vapor samples in comparison with the e-liquids before they came in contact with the customized e-cigarettes that were provided by everyday e-cigarette users. Lead and zinc were 2,000% higher and chromium, nickel, and tin were 600% higher. The e-cigarette vapor levels for nickel, chromium, lead, manganese surpassed occupational or environmental standards for at least 50% of the samples. The same study found 10% of the e-liquids tested contained arsenic and the amounts remained about the same as the e-cigarette vapor.

The average amounts of exposure to cadmium from 1,200 e-cigarette puffs were found to be 2.6 times lower than the chronic Permissible Daily Exposure from inhalation medications, outlined by the US Pharmacopeia. One sample tested resulted in daily exposure 10% greater than chronic PDE from inhalation medications, while in four samples the amounts were comparable to outdoor air levels. Cadmium and lead have been found in the e-cigarette vapor at 2–3 times greater levels than with a nicotine inhaler. A 2015 study stated the amount of copper have been found to be six times greater than with cigarette smoke. A 2013 study stated the levels of nickel have been found to be 100 times higher than cigarette smoke.

A 2014 study stated the levels of silver have been found to be at a greater amount than with cigarette smoke. Increased amounts of copper and zinc in vapor generated by some e-cigarettes may be the result of corrosion on the brass electrical connector as indicated in particulates of copper and zinc in e-liquid. In addition, a tin solder joint may be subjected to corrosion, which may result in increased amounts of tin in some e-liquids.

Generally low levels of contaminates may include metals from the heating coils, solders, and wick. The metals nickel, chromium, and copper coated with silver have been used to make the normally thin-wired e-cigarette heating elements. The atomizers and heating coils possibly contain aluminum. They likely account for most of the aluminum in the e-cigarette vapor. The chromium used to make the atomizers and heating coils is probably the origin of the chromium. Copper is commonly used to make atomizers. Atomizers and heating coils commonly contain iron.

Cadmium, lead, nickel, and silver originated from the heating element. Silicate particles may originate from the fiberglass wicks. Silicate nanoparticles have been found in vapors generated from the fiberglass wicks. Tin may originate from the e-cigarette solder joints. Nickel potentially found in the e-cigarette vapor may originate from the atomizer and heating coils. The nanoparticles can be produced by the heating element or by pyrolysis of chemicals directly touching the wire surface.

Chromium, iron, tin, and nickel nanoparticles potentially found in the e-cigarette vapor can originate from the e-cigarette heating coils. Kanthal and nichrome are frequently used heating coils which may account for chromium and nickel in the e-cigarette vapor. Metals can originate from the "cartomizer" from the later-generation devices where an atomizer and cartridge are constructed into one unit. Metal and glass particles can be created and vaporized because of the heating of the liquid with glass fiber.

====== Solutions ======
Metal coils coated with microporous ceramic have been developed to protect against oxidation of metals.

====== Comparison of levels of metals in e-cigarette aerosol ======
Amounts of metals from e-cigarette use compared with regulatory safety limits∗
Metals	EC01	EC02	EC03	EC04	EC05	EC06	EC07	EC08	EC09	EC10	EC11	EC12	EC13	Average
Cadmium; per 1200 puffs	1.2	1.04	1.04	0	0.16	1.6	0	0.48	0	1.2	0.08	0	NM	0.57
Permissible Daily Exposure; (United States Pharmacopeia)	1.5	1.5	1.5	1.5	1.5	1.5	1.5	1.5	1.5	1.5	1.5	1.5	1.5	
Chromium; per 1200 puffs	0	0	0	0	0	0	0	0	0	0	0	0	0.84	0.06
Permissible Daily Exposure; (United States Pharmacopeia)	25	25	25	25	25	25	25	25	25	25	25	25	25	
Copper; per 1200 puffs	0	0	0	0	0	0	0	0	0	0	0	0	24.36	1.87
Permissible Daily Exposure; (United States Pharmacopeia)	70	70	70	70	70	70	70	70	70	70	70	70	70	
Lead; per 1200 puffs	0.32	0.32	0.4	0.08	0.24	0.08	0.16	4.4	0.56	0.32	0.16	0.08	2.04	0.70
Permissible Daily Exposure; (United States Pharmacopeia)	5	5	5	5	5	5	5	5	5	5	5	5	5	
Nickel; per 1200 puffs	0.88	0.96	0.32	0	0	0	0.48	0.72	0.16	0	0	0	0.6	0.32
Permissible Daily Exposure; (United States Pharmacopeia)	1.5	1.5	1.5	1.5	1.5	1.5	1.5	1.5	1.5	1.5	1.5	1.5	1.5	
Manganese; per 1200 puffs	0	0	0	0	0	0	0	0	0	0	0	0	0.24	0.02
Minimal Risk Level; Agency for Toxic; Substances and Disease Registry	6	6	6	6	6	6	6	6	6	6	6	6	6	
Aluminum; per 1200 puffs	NM	NM	NM	NM	NM	NM	NM	NM	NM	NM	NM	NM	47.28	47.28
Recommended Exposure Limit; National Institute for Occupational Safety and Health	41,500	41,500	41,500	41,500	41,500	41,500	41,500	41,500	41,500	41,500	41,500	41,500	41,500	
Barium; per 1200 puffs	0	0	0	0	0	0	0	0	0	0	0	0	1.44	0.11
Recommended Exposure Limit; National Institute for Occupational Safety and Health	4,150	4,150	4,150	4,150	4,150	4,150	4,150	4,150	4,150	4,150	4,150	4,150	4,150	
Iron; per 1200 puffs	NM	NM	NM	NM	NM	NM	NM	NM	NM	NM	NM	NM	62.4	62.40
Recommended Exposure Limit; National Institute for Occupational Safety and Health	41,500	41,500	41,500	41,500	41,500	41,500	41,500	41,500	41,500	41,500	41,500	41,500	41,500	
Tin; per 1200 puffs	NM	NM	NM	NM	NM	NM	NM	NM	NM	NM	NM	NM	4.44	4.44
Recommended Exposure Limit; National Institute for Occupational Safety and Health	16,600	16,600	16,600	16,600	16,600	16,600	16,600	16,600	16,600	16,600	16,600	16,600	16,600	
Titanium; per 1200 puffs	NM	NM	NM	NM	NM	NM	NM	NM	NM	NM	NM	NM	0.24	0.24
Recommended Exposure Limit; National Institute for Occupational Safety and Health	2,490	2,490	2,490	2,490	2,490	2,490	2,490	2,490	2,490	2,490	2,490	2,490	2,490	
Zinc; per 1200 puffs	0	0	0	0	0	0	0	0	0	0	0	0	6.96	0.54
Recommended Exposure Limit; National Institute for Occupational Safety and Health	41,500	41,500	41,500	41,500	41,500	41,500	41,500	41,500	41,500	41,500	41,500	41,500	41,500	
Zirconium; per 1200 puffs	NM	NM	NM	NM	NM	NM	NM	NM	NM	NM	NM	NM	0.84	0.84
Recommended Exposure Limit; National Institute for Occupational Safety and Health	41,500	41,500	41,500	41,500	41,500	41,500	41,500	41,500	41,500	41,500	41,500	41,500	41,500	

Abbreviations: EC, electronic cigarette; NM, not measured.
∗The findings are a comparison between e-cigarette daily usage and the regulatory limits of chronic Permissible Daily Exposure from inhalation medications outlined by the US Pharmacopeia for cadmium, chromium, copper, lead and nickel, the Minimal Risk Level outlined by the Agency for Toxic Substances and Disease Registry for manganese and the Recommended Exposure Limit outlined by the National Institute for Occupational Safety and Health for aluminum, barium, iron, tin, titanium, zinc and zirconium, referring to a daily inhalation volume of 20 m^{3} air and a 10-h volume of 8.3 m^{3}; values are in μg.

===== Carbonyls and other content =====
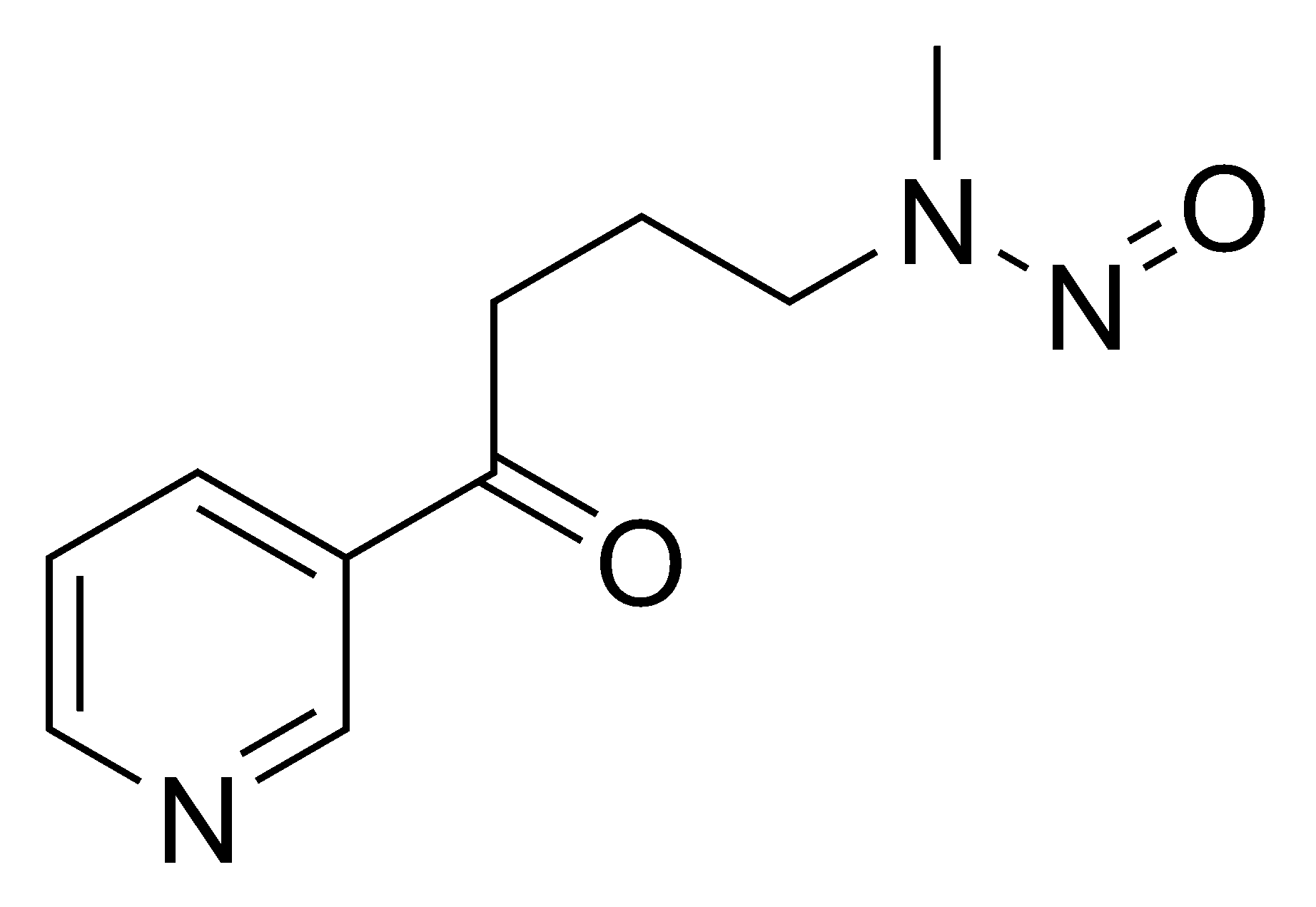
The nicotine-derived nitrosamine ketone (NNK) molecule

E-cigarette makers do not fully disclose information on the chemicals that can be released or synthesized during use. The chemicals in the e-cigarette vapor can be different than with the liquid. Once vaporized, the ingredients in the e-liquid go through chemical reactions that form new compounds not previously found in the liquid. (Note: The presence of new chemicals are formed from the heating process and the e-liquid flavoring.) Many chemicals including carbonyl compounds such as formaldehyde, acetaldehyde, acrolein, and glyoxal can inadvertently be produced when the nichrome wire (heating element) that touches the e-liquid is heated and chemically reacted with the liquid. Acrolein and other carbonyls have been found by in e-cigarette vapors that were created by unmodified e-cigarettes, indicating that formation of these compounds could be more common than previously thought.

A 2017 review found "Increasing the battery voltage from 3.3 V to 4.8 V doubles the amount of e-liquid vapourized and increases the total aldehyde generation more than threefold, with acrolein emission increasing tenfold." A 2014 study stated that "increasing the voltage from 3.2 to 4.8 V resulted in a 4 to >200 times increase in the formaldehyde, acetaldehyde, and acetone levels". The amount of carbonyl compounds in e-cigarette aerosols varies substantially, not only among different brands but also among different samples of the same products, from 100-fold less than tobacco to nearly equivalent values.

The propylene glycol-containing liquids produced the most amounts of carbonyls in e-cigarette aerosols. Propylene glycol could turn into propylene oxide when heated and aerosolized. (Note: A 2017 review found "When heated to high temperatures, as can occur with the use of advanced EC devices, propylene glycol can form thermal dehydration products such as acetaldehyde, formaldehyde, and propylene oxide.") Glycerin may generate acrolein when heated at hotter temperatures. (Note: A 2017 review found "Thermal decomposition of e-cigarette solvents results in release of toxic metals, and formation of an array of organic compounds such as acrolein from glycerol, and propylene oxide from propylene glycol.") Some e-cigarette products had acrolein identified in the e-cigarette vapor, at greatly lower amounts than in cigarette smoke. Several e-cigarette companies have replaced glycerin and propylene glycol with ethylene glycol. In 2014, most e-cigarettes companies began to use water and glycerin as replacement for propylene glycol.

In 2015, manufacturers attempted to reduce the formation of formaldehyde and metal substances of the e-cigarette vapor by producing an e-liquid in which propylene glycol is replaced by glycerin. Acetol, beta-nicotyrine, butanal, crotonaldehyde, glyceraldehyde, glycidol, glyoxal, dihydroxyacetone, dioxolanes, lactic acid, methylglyoxal, myosmine, oxalic acid, propanal, pyruvic acid, and vinyl alcohol isomers have been found in the e-cigarette vapor. Hydroxymethylfurfural and furfural have been found in the e-cigarette vapors. The amounts of furans in the e-cigarette vapors were highly associated with power of the e-cigarette and amount of sweetener.

The amount of carbonyls vary greatly among different companies and within various samples of the same e-cigarettes. Oxidants and reactive oxygen species (OX/ROS) have been found in the e-cigarette vapor. OX/ROS could react with other chemicals in the e-cigarette vapor because they are highly reactive, causing alterations its chemical composition. E-cigarette vapor have been found to contain OX/ROS at about 100 times less than with cigarette smoke. A 2018 review found e-cigarette vapor containing reactive oxygen radicals seem to be similar to levels in traditional cigarettes. Glyoxal and methylglyoxal found in e-cigarette vapors are not found in cigarette smoke.

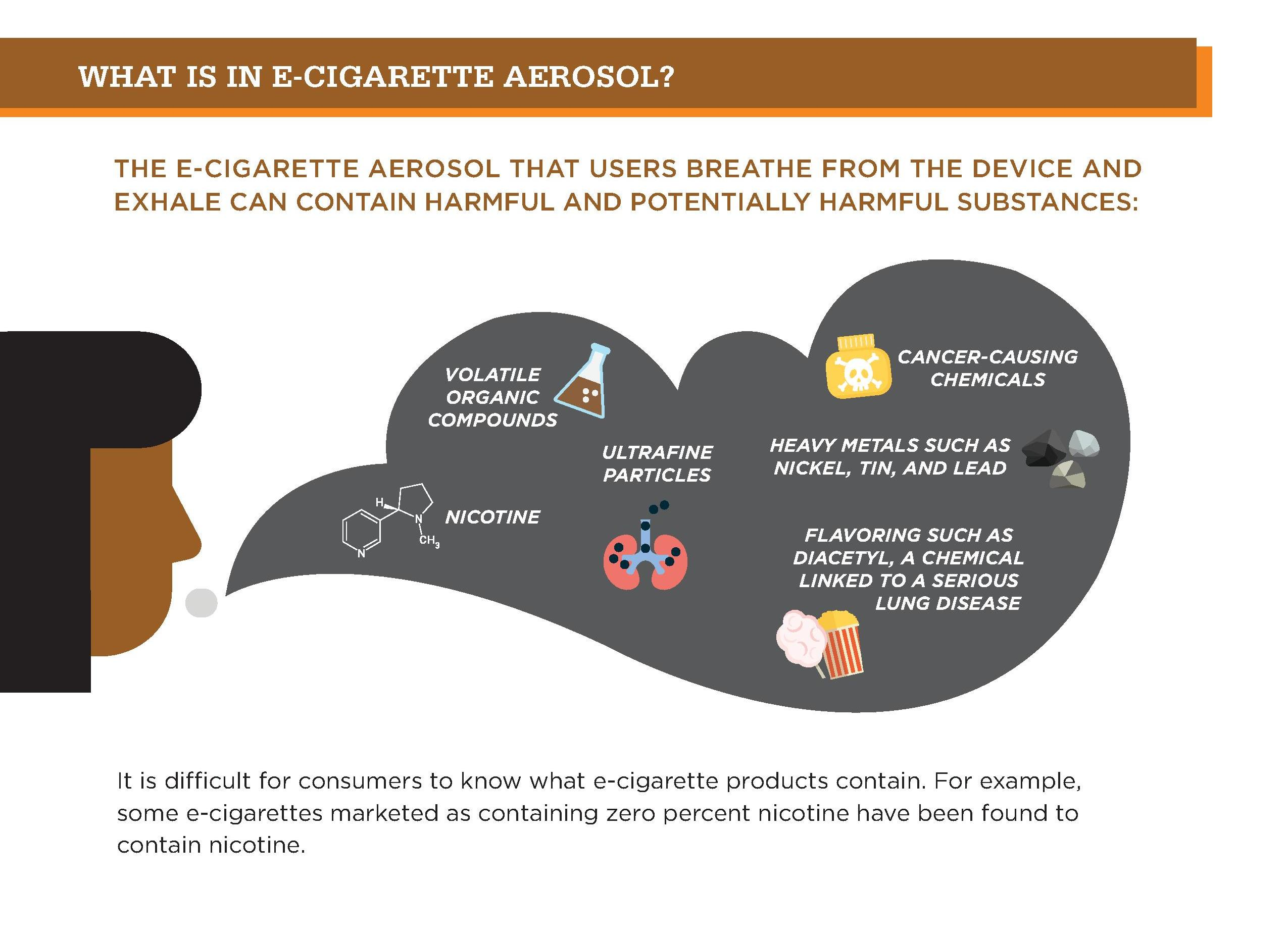
General information on what is in e-cigarette aerosol

Contamination with various chemicals have been identified. Some products contained trace amounts of the drugs tadalafil and rimonabant. The amount of either of these substances that is able to transfer from liquid to vapor phase is low.

The nicotine impurities in the e-liquid varies greatly across companies. The levels of toxic chemicals in e-cigarette vapor is in some cases similar to that of nicotine replacement products. Tobacco-specific nitrosamines (TSNAs) such as nicotine-derived nitrosamine ketone (NNK) and N-Nitrosonornicotine (NNN) and tobacco-specific impurities have been found in the e-cigarette vapor at very low levels, comparable to amounts found in nicotine replacement products. A 2014 study that tested 12 e-cigarette devices found that most of them contained tobacco-specific nitrosamines in the e-cigarette vapor. In contrast, the one nicotine inhaler tested did not contain tobacco-specific nitrosamines.

N-Nitrosoanabasine and N'-Nitrosoanatabine have been found in the e-cigarette vapor at lower levels than cigarette smoke. Tobacco-specific nitrosamines (TSNAs), nicotine-derived nitrosamine ketone (NNK), N-Nitrosonornicotine (NNN), and N′-nitrosoanatabine have been found in the e-cigarette vapor at different levels between different devices. Since e-liquid production is not rigorously regulated, some e-liquids can have amounts of impurities higher compared to limits for pharmaceutical-grade nicotine products.

m-Xylene, p-Xylene, o-Xylene, ethyl acetate, ethanol, methanol, pyridine, acetylpyrazine, 2,3,5-trimethylpyrazine, octamethylcyclotetrasiloxane, catechol, m-Cresol, and o-Cresol have been found in the e-cigarette vapor. A 2017 study found that "The maximum detected concentrations of benzene, methanol, and ethanol in the samples were higher than their authorized maximum limits as residual solvents in pharmaceutical products." Trace amounts of toluene and xylene have been found in the e-cigarette vapor.

Polycyclic aromatic hydrocarbons (PAHs), aldehydes, volatile organic compounds (VOCs), phenolic compounds, flavors, tobacco alkaloids, o-Methyl benzaldehyde, 1-Methyl phenanthrene, anthracene, phenanthrene, pyrene, and cresol have been found in the e-cigarette vapor. While the cause of these differing concentrations of minor tobacco alkaloids is unknown, Lisko and colleagues (2015) speculated potential reasons may derive from the e-liquid extraction process (i.e., purification and manufacturing) used to obtain nicotine from tobacco, as well as poor quality control of e-liquid products. In some studies, small quantities of VOCs including styrene have been found in the e-cigarette vapor. A 2014 study found the amounts of PAHs were above specified safe exposure limits.

Low levels of isoprene, acetic acid, 2-butanodione, acetone, propanol, and diacetin, and traces of apple oil (3-methylbutyl-3-methylbutanoate) have been found in the e-cigarette vapor. Flavoring substances from roasted coffee beans have been found in the e-cigarette vapor. The aroma chemicals acetamide and cumarine have been found in the e-cigarette vapor. Acrylonitrile and ethylbenzene have been found in the e-cigarette vapor. Benzene and 1,3-Butadiene have been found in the e-cigarette vapor at many-fold lower than in cigarette smoke.

Some e-cigarettes contain diacetyl and acetaldehyde in the e-cigarette vapor. Diacetyl and acetylpropionyl have been found at greater levels in the e-cigarette vapor than is accepted by the National Institute for Occupational Safety and Health, although diacetyl and acetylpropionyl are normally found at lower levels in e-cigarettes than with traditional cigarettes. A 2018 PHE report stated that diacetyl was identified at hundreds of times in lesser amounts than found in cigarette smoke. A 2016 WHO report found that acetaldehyde from second-hand vapor was between two and eight times greater compared to background air levels.

===== Formaldehyde =====
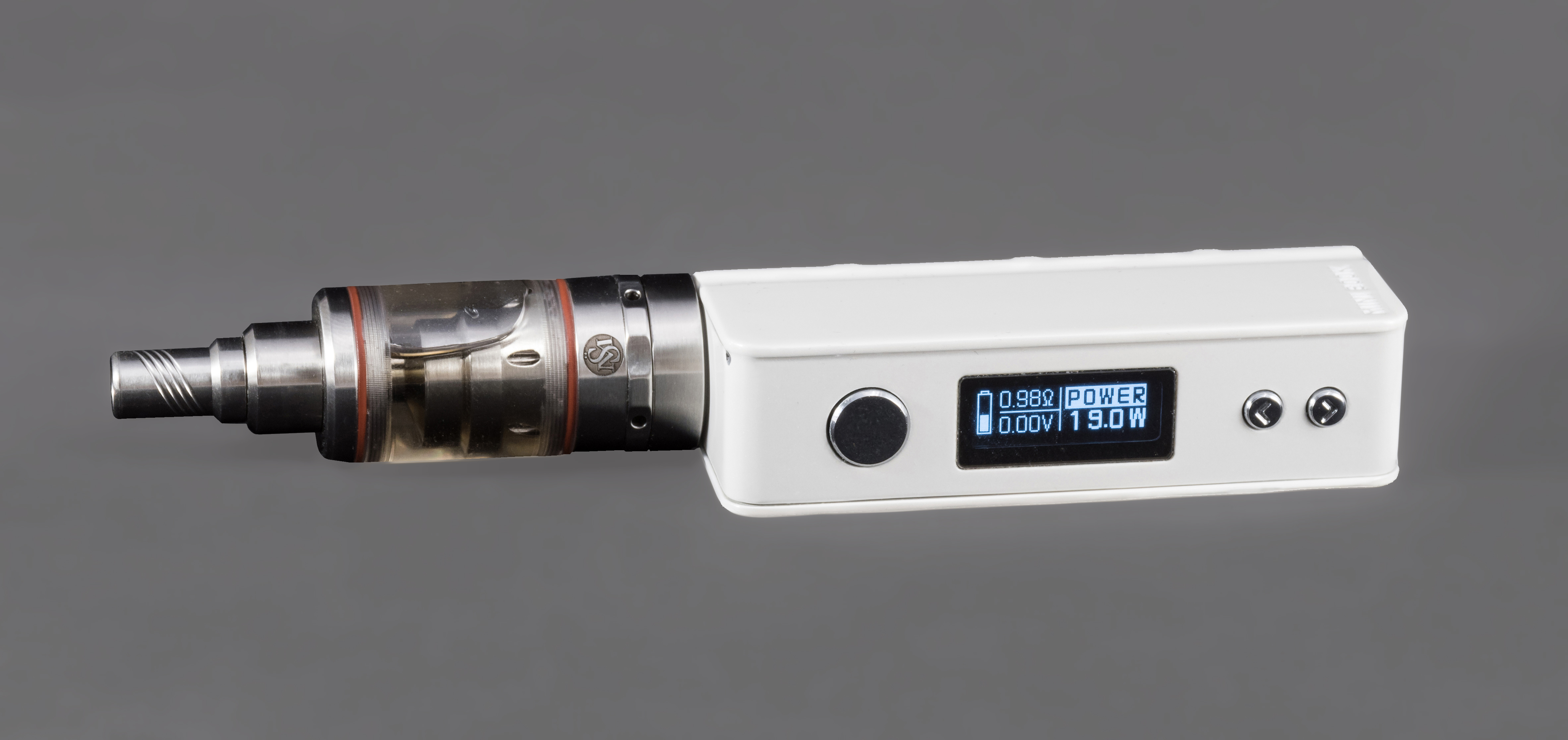
An e-cigarette with a variable voltage battery

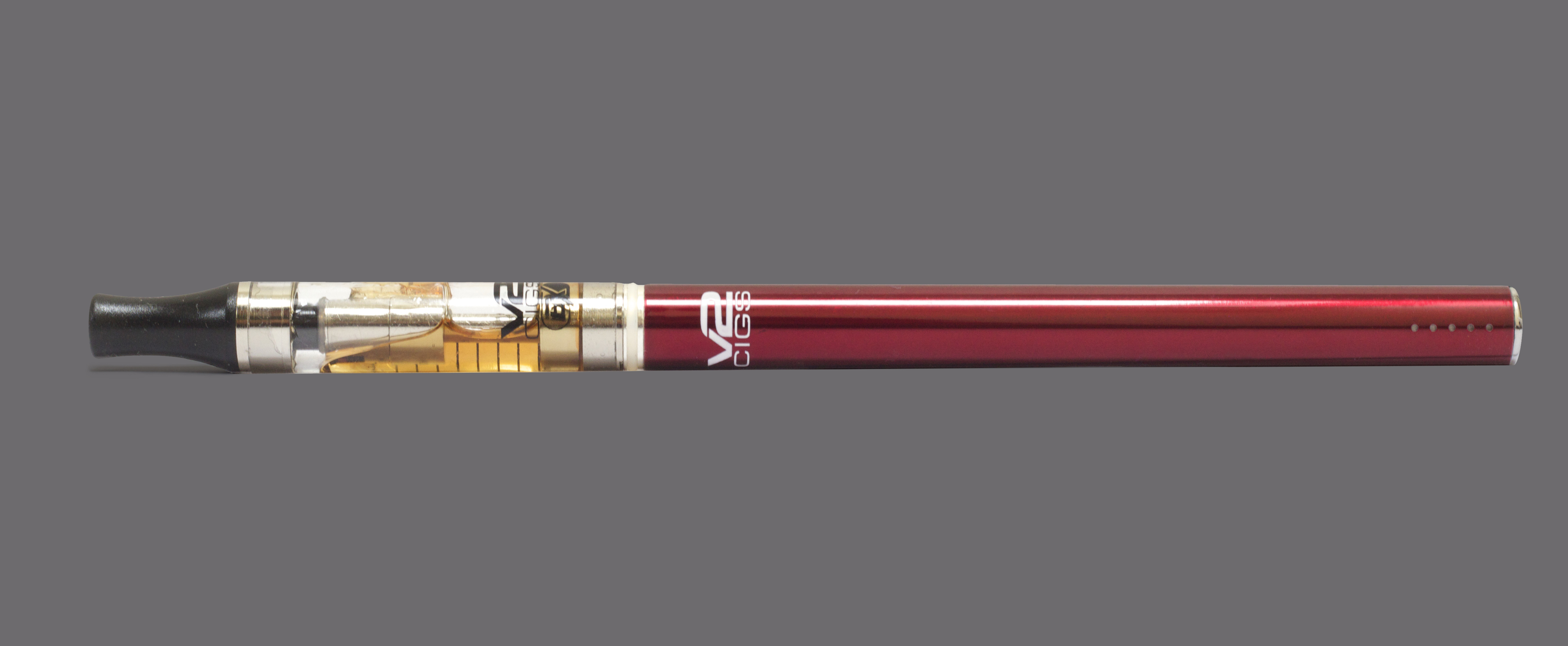
A pen-style second-generation e-cigarette

A 2016 WHO report found that formaldehyde from second-hand vapor was around 20% greater compared to background air levels. Normal usage of e-cigarettes generates very low levels of formaldehyde. Different power settings reached significant differences in the amount of formaldehyde in the e-cigarette vapor across different devices. Later-generation e-cigarette devices can create greater amounts of carcinogens. Some later-generation e-cigarettes let users increase the volume of vapor by adjusting the battery output voltage.

Depending on the heating temperature, the carcinogens in the e-cigarette vapor may surpass the levels of cigarette smoke. E-cigarettes devices using higher voltage batteries can produce carcinogens including formaldehyde at levels comparable to cigarette smoke. The later-generation and "tank-style" devices with higher voltages (5.0 V) could produce formaldehyde at comparable or greater levels than in cigarette smoke.

A 2015 study hypothesized from the data that at high voltage (5.0 V), a user, "vaping at a rate of 3 mL/day, would inhale 14.4 ± 3.3 mg of formaldehyde per day in formaldehyde-releasing agents." The 2015 study used a puffing machine showed that a third-generation e-cigarette turned on to the maximum setting would create levels of formaldehyde between five and 15 times greater than with cigarette smoke. A 2015 PHE report found that high levels of formaldehyde only occurred in overheated "dry-puffing", and that "dry puffs are aversive and are avoided rather than inhaled", and "At normal settings, there was no or negligible formaldehyde release."

A 2018 study confirmed e-cigarettes can emit formaldehyde at high levels more than 5 times higher than what is reported for cigarette smoke) at moderate temperatures and under conditions that have been reported to be non-averse to users. But e-cigarette users may "learn" to overcome the unpleasant taste due to elevated aldehyde formation, when the nicotine craving is high enough. High voltage e-cigarettes are capable of producing large amounts of carbonyls. Reduced voltage (3.0 V) e-cigarettes had e-cigarette aerosol levels of formaldehyde and acetaldehyde roughly 13 and 807-fold less than with cigarette smoke.

== Chemical analysis of e-cigarette cartridges, solutions, and aerosol ==
Studies involving chemical analysis of e-cigarette cartridges, solutions, and aerosol.
Authors (Reference)	E-cigarette brand	Substances tested	Analysis	Key finding
Studies reporting positive or neutral impact of e-cigarettes, vaping, or harm reduction based on the absence or presence of specific toxicants
Laugesen (9) (Research funded by Runyan)	Runyon	TSNA	LC-MS	TSNAs are present but at levels much lower than in conventional cigarettes and too small to be carcinogenic
		MAO-A and B inhibitors	Fluorometric assay	MAO-A and B are inhibited by tobacco smoke but unaffected by e-cigarette fluid
		PAH	GS-MS	Polycyclic aromatic hydrocarbons undetectable
		Heavy metals	ICP-MS	Heavy metals were undetectable
		CO	CO analyzer	Exhaled carbon monoxide does not increase after e-cigarette use
McAuley et al.. (11)	Brand not indicated.	TSNA	GC/MS	TSNA, PAH, diethylene glycol, VOC, and carbonyls in e-cigarette aerosol were all negligible compared to cigarette smoke.
		PAH	GC/MS	
		Diethylene Glycol	GC/MS	
		VOC	HS-GC/MS	
		Carbonyls	HPLC-UV	
Pellegrino et al. (56)	Italian brand of e-cigarettes	Particulate matter	Particle counter and smoking machine	Particulate matter is lower in e-cigarette aerosol compared to cigarette smoke
Goniewicz et al.. (53)	Eleven brands of Polish and one brand of English e-cigarettes	Carbonyls	HPLC-DAD	TSNA, VOC, and carbonyl compounds were determined to be between 9 and 450 times lower in e-cigarettes aerosol compared to conventional cigarette smoke
		VOC	GC-MS	
		TSNA	UPLC-MS	
		Heavy metals	ICP-MS	Heavy metals present in e-cigarette aerosol
Kim and Shin (55)	105 Replacement liquid brands from 11 Korean e-cigarette companies	TSNA	LC-MS	TSNAs are present at low levels in e-cigarette replacement liquids
Schripp et al.. (54)	Three unidentified brands	VOC	GC-MS	VOC in e-cigarette cartridges, solutions, and aerosolized aerosol were low or undetectable compared to conventional cigarettes
		Particulate matter	Particle counter and smoking machine	Particulate matter is lower in e-cigarette aerosol compared to cigarette smoke
Studies reporting negative impact of e-cigarettes, vaping, or harm reduction based on presence of specific toxicants
Westenberger (4) FDA study	Njoy	TSNA	LC-MS	TSNA present
	Smoking everywhere	Diethylene glycol	GC-MS	Diethylene glycol present
		Tobacco specific impurities	GC-MS	Tobacco specific impurities present
Trehy et al.. (58) FDA study	Njoy	Nicotine related impurities	HPLC-DAD	Nicotine related impurities present
	Smoking everywhere			
	CIXI			
	Johnson creek			
Hadwiger et al.. (57) FDA study	Brand not indicated	Amino-tadalafil	HPLC-DAD-MMI-MS	Amino-tadalafil present
		Rimonabant		Rimonabant present
Williams et al.. (50)	Brand not indicated	Heavy metals	ICP-MS	Heavy metal and silicate particles present in e-cigarette aerosol
		Silicate particles	Particle counter and smoking machine, light and electron microscopy, cytotoxicity testing, x-ray microanalysis	

Abbreviations: TSNA, tobacco specific nitrosoamines; LC-MS, liquid chromatography-mass spectrometry; MAO-A and B, monoamineoxidase A and B; PAH, polycyclic aromatic hydrocarbons; GS-MS, gas chromatography – mass spectrometry; ICP-MS, inductively coupled plasma – mass spectrometry; CO, carbon monoxide, VOC, volatile organic compounds; UPLC-MS, ultra-performance liquid chromatography-mass spectrometry; HPLC-DAD-MMI-MS, high performance liquid chromatography-diode array detector-multi-mode ionization-mass spectrometry.

== Aldehydes in e-cigarette aerosol ==
Aldehydes in aerosols of e-cigarettes∗
Study	Units	Formaldehyde	Acetaldehyde	Acrolein	o-Methyl benzaldehyde	Acetone
Goniewicz et al..	μg/150 puffs	3.2±0.8 to	2.0±0.1 to	N.D. to	1.3±0.8 to	N.T.
Ohta et al..	mg/m^{3}	260	<LOQ	<LOQ	N.T.	N.T.
Uchiyama et al..	mg/m^{3}	8.3	11	9.3	N.T.	2.9
Laugesen	ppm/38 mL puff	0.25	0.34	N.D. to 0.33	N.T.	0.16

∗Abbreviations: <LOQ, below the limit of quantitation but above the limit of detection; N.D., not detected; N.T., not tested.

== Tobacco-specific nitrosamines in nicotine-containing products ==
Tobacco-specific nitrosamines in various nicotine-containing products∗
Item	NNN (4-(methylnitrosamino)-1-(3-pyridyl)-1-butanone)	NNK (N'-nitrosonornicotine)	NAT (N'-nitrosoanatabine)	NAB (N'-nitrosoanabasine)
Nicorette gum (4 mg)	2.00	Not detected	Not detected	Not detected
NicoDerm CQ patch (4 mg)	Not detected	8.00	Not detected	Not detected
E-cigarettes	3.87	1.46	2.16	0.69
Swedish snus	980.00	180.00	790.00	60.00
Winston (full)	2200.00	580.00	560.00	25.00
Marlboro (full)	2900.00	960.00	2300.00	100.00

∗ng/g, but not for gum and patch. ng/gum piece is for gum and ng/patch is for patch.

== Comparison of levels of toxicants in e-cigarette aerosol ==
Amounts of toxicants in e-cigarette aerosol compared with nicotine inhaler and cigarette smoke
Toxicant	Range of content in nicotine inhaler mist (15 puffs∗)	Content in aerosol from 12 e-cigarettes (15 puffs∗)	Content in traditional cigarette micrograms (μg) in smoke from one cigarette
Formaldehyde (μg)	0.2	0.2-5.61	1.6-52
Acetaldehyde (μg)	0.11	0.11-1.36	52-140
Acrolein (μg)	ND	0.07-4.19	2.4-62
o-Methylbenzaldehyde (μg)	0.07	0.13-0.71	—
Toluene (μg)	ND	ND-0.63	8.3-70
p- and m-Xylene (μg)	ND	ND-0.2	—
NNN (ng)	ND	ND-0.00043	0.0005-0.19
Cadmium (ng)	0.003	ND-0.022	—
Nickel (ng)	0.019	0.011-0.029	—
Lead (ng)	0.004	0.003-0.057	—

Abbreviations: μg, microgram; ng, nanogram; ND, not detected.
∗Fifteen puffs were chosen to estimate the nicotine delivery of one traditional cigarette.

Each e-cigarette cartridge, which varies across manufacturers, and each cartridge produces 10 to 250 puffs of vapor. This correlates to 5 to 30 traditional cigarettes. A puff usually lasts for 3 to 4 seconds. A 2014 study found there is wide differences in daily puffs in experienced vapers, which typically varies from 120 to 225 puffs per day. From puff-to-puff e-cigarettes do not provide as much nicotine as traditional cigarettes. A 2016 review found "The nicotine contained in the aerosol from 13 puffs of an e-cigarette in which the nicotine concentration of the liquid is 18 mg per milliliter has been estimated to be similar to the amount in the smoke of a typical tobacco cigarette, which contains approximately 0.5 mg of nicotine."

== See also ==
- Chemical pneumonitis
- Composition of heated tobacco product emissions
- Adverse effects of electronic cigarettes
- List of additives in cigarettes
- List of cigarette smoke carcinogens
- Safety of electronic cigarettes
- Vaping-associated pulmonary injury

== Bibliography ==
- McNeill, A; Brose, LS; Calder, R; Bauld, L; Robson, D (February 2018). "Evidence review of e-cigarettes and heated tobacco products 2018" (PDF). UK: Public Health England. pp. 1–243.
- Stratton, Kathleen; Kwan, Leslie Y.; Eaton, David L. (January 2018). Stratton, Kathleen; Kwan, Leslie Y.; Eaton, David L. (eds.). Public Health Consequences of E-Cigarettes (PDF). National Academies of Sciences, Engineering, and Medicine (National Academies Press). pp. 1–774. Bibcode:2018nap..book24952N. doi:10.17226/24952. ISBN 978-0-309-46834-3. PMID 29894118.
- McNeill, A; Brose, LS; Calder, R; Hitchman, SC; Hajek, P; McRobbie, H (August 2015). "E-cigarettes: an evidence update" (PDF). UK: Public Health England. pp. 1–113.
- "Electronic Nicotine Delivery Systems and Electronic Non-Nicotine Delivery Systems (ENDS/ENNDS)" (PDF). World Health Organization WHO. August 2016. pp. 1–11.
- Wilder, Natalie; Daley, Claire; Sugarman, Jane; Partridge, James (April 2016). "Nicotine without smoke: Tobacco harm reduction". UK: Royal College of Physicians. pp. 1–191.
- "State Health Officer's Report on E-Cigarettes: A Community Health Threat" (PDF). California Tobacco Control Program. California Department of Public Health. January 2015. pp. 1–21.
