= Nitrosamine =

Organic compounds of the form >N–N=O

Structure of the nitrosamino group

Nitrosamines (or more formally N-nitrosamines) are organic compounds having the chemical structure R_{2}N−N=O, where R is usually an alkyl group.

Nitrosamines have a nitroso group (NO^{+}) that are "probable human carcinogens", bonded to a deprotonated amine. Most nitrosamines are carcinogenic in animals. A 2006 systematic review supports a "positive association between nitrite and nitrosamine intake and gastric cancer, between meat and processed meat intake and gastric cancer and oesophageal cancer, and between preserved fish, vegetable and smoked food intake and gastric cancer, but is not conclusive".

More recently: "Decades of toxicological and epidemiological evidence have unequivocally established several NAs [nitrosamines] as potent human carcinogens, with strong associations with gastrointestinal, pancreatic, and liver cancers."

== Chemistry ==
Metabolic activation of the nitrosamine NDMA converts it to the alkylating agent diazomethane

The organic chemistry of nitrosamines is well developed with regard to their syntheses, their structures, and their reactions. They usually are produced by the reaction of nitrous acid (HNO_{2}) and secondary amines, although other nitrosyl sources (e.g. N_{2}O_{4}, NOCl, RONO) have the same effect:

HONO + R_{2}NH → R_{2}N-NO + H_{2}O

The nitrous acid usually arises from protonation of a nitrite. This synthesis method is relevant to the generation of nitrosamines under some biological conditions. The nitrosation is also reversible, particularly in acidic solutions of nucleophiles. Aryl nitrosamines rearrange to give a para-nitroso aryl amine in the Fischer-Hepp rearrangement.

With regards to structure, the C_{2}N_{2}O core of nitrosamines is planar, as established by X-ray crystallography. The N-N and N-O distances are 132 and 126 pm, respectively in dimethylnitrosamine, one of the simplest members of a large class of N-nitrosamines.

Nitrosamines are not directly carcinogenic. Metabolic activation is required to convert them to the alkylating agents that modify bases in DNA, inducing mutations. The specific alkylating agents vary with the nitrosamine, but all are proposed to feature alkyldiazonium centers.

== History and occurrence ==
In 1956, two British scientists, John Barnes and Peter Magee, reported that a simple member of the large class of N-nitrosamines, dimethylnitrosamine, produced liver tumours in rats. Subsequent studies showed that approximately 90% of the 300 nitrosamines tested were carcinogenic in a wide variety of animals.

=== Tobacco exposure ===
A common way ordinary consumers are exposed to nitrosamines is through tobacco use and cigarette smoke. Tobacco-specific nitrosamines also can be found in American dip snuff, chewing tobacco, and to a much lesser degree, snus (127.9 ppm for American dip snuff compared to 2.8 ppm in Swedish snuff or snus).

=== Dietary exposure ===
Nitroso compounds react with primary amines in acidic environments to form nitrosamines, which human metabolism converts to mutagenic diazo compounds. Small amounts of nitro and nitroso compounds form during meat curing; the toxicity of these compounds preserves the meat against bacterial infection. After curing completes, the concentration of these compounds appears to degrade over time. Their presence in finished products has been tightly regulated since several food-poisoning cases in the early 20th century, but consumption of large quantities of processed meats can still cause a slight elevation in gastric and oesophageal cancer risk today.

For example, during the 1970s, certain Norwegian farm animals began exhibiting elevated levels of liver cancer. These animals had been fed herring meal preserved with sodium nitrite. The sodium nitrite had reacted with dimethylamine in the fish and produced dimethylnitrosamine.

The effects of nitroso compounds vary dramatically across the gastrointestinal tract, and with diet. Nitroso compounds present in stool do not induce nitrosamine formation, because stool has neutral pH. Stomach acid catalyzes nitrosamine compound formation and is the main location of the reaction during digestion.

The formation process is inhibited when amine concentration is low (e.g. a low-protein diet or no fermented food). The process may also be inhibited in the case of high vitamin C (ascorbic acid) or erythorbic acid concentration (e.g. high-fruit diet). However, when 10% of the meal is fat, the effect reverses, and ascorbic acid markedly increases nitrosamine formation. Vitamin C and erythorbic acid are already commonly used in the meat industry because they enhance the binding of nitrite to myoglobin, encouraging the formation of the desired pink color.

=== Medication impurities ===
There have been recalls for various medications due to the presence of nitrosamine impurities. Some of those medications that have been recalled include angiotensin II receptor blockers, ranitidine, valsartan, and duloxetine.

The US Food and Drug Administration published guidance about the control of nitrosamine impurities in medicines. Health Canada published guidance about nitrosamine impurities in medications and a list of established acceptable intake limits of nitrosamine impurities in medications.

== Examples ==
Substance name	CAS number	Synonyms	Molecular formula	Physical appearance	Carcinogenity category
N-Nitrosonornicotine	16543-55-8	NNN	C_{9}H_{11}N_{3}O	Light yellow low-melting solid	
4-(methylnitrosamino)-1-(3-pyridyl)-1-butanone	64091-91-4	NNK, 4′-(nitrosomethylamino)-1-(3-pyridyl)-1-butanone	C_{10}H_{15}N_{3}O_{2}	Light yellow oil	
N-Nitrosodimethylamine	62-75-9	Dimethylnitrosamine, N,N-dimethylnitrosamine, NDMA, DMN	C_{2}H_{6}N_{2}O	Yellow liquid	EPA-B2; IARC-2A; OSHA carcinogen; TLV-A3
N-Nitrosodiethylamine	55-18-5	Diethylnitrosamide, diethylnitrosamine, N,N-diethylnitrosamine, N-ethyl-N-nitrosoethanamine, diethylnitrosamine, DANA, DENA, DEN, NDEA	C_{4}H_{10}N_{2}O	Yellow liquid	EPA-B2; IARC-2A
4-(Methylnitrosamino)-1-(3-pyridyl)-1-butanol	76014-81-8	NNAL			
N-Nitrosoanabasine	37620-20-5	NAB	C_{10}H_{13}N_{3}O	Yellow Oil	IARC-3
N-Nitrosoanatabine	71267-22-6	NAT	C_{10}H_{11}N_{3}O	Clear yellow-to-orange oil	IARC-3

== See also ==
- Hydrazines derived from these nitrosamines, e.g. UDMH, are also carcinogenic.
- Possible health hazards of pickled vegetables
- Tobacco-specific nitrosamines

== Additional reading ==
- Altkofer, Werner; Braune, Stefan; Ellendt, Kathi; Kettl-Grömminger, Margit; Steiner, Gabriele (2005). "Migration of nitrosamines from rubber products - are balloons and condoms harmful to the human health?". Molecular Nutrition & Food Research. 49 (3): 235–238. doi:10.1002/mnfr.200400050. PMID 15672455.
- Proctor, Robert N. (2012). Golden Holocaust: Origins of the Cigarette Catastrophe and the Case for Abolition. Berkeley: University of California Press. ISBN 9780520950436. OCLC 784884555.
