= Nornicotine =

Names
- IUPAC name 3-[(2S)-2-Pyrrolidinyl]pyridine
- Other names Demethylnicotine

Identifiers
CAS Number	494-97-3 S enantiomer
3D model (JSmol)	Interactive image
ChemSpider	82588
ECHA InfoCard	100.165.066
PubChem CID	91462
UNII	83H6L5QD8Z
CompTox Dashboard (EPA)	DTXSID50862034
- InChI: InChI=1S/C9H12N2/c1-3-8(7-10-5-1)9-4-2-6-11-9/h1,3,5,7,9,11H,2,4,6H2/t9-/m0/s1 Key: MYKUKUCHPMASKF-VIFPVBQESA-N; InChI=1/C9H12N2/c1-3-8(7-10-5-1)9-4-2-6-11-9/h1,3,5,7,9,11H,2,4,6H2/t9-/m0/s1 Key: MYKUKUCHPMASKF-VIFPVBQEBM
- SMILES: n1cccc(c1)[C@H]2NCCC2

Properties
Chemical formula	C_{9}H_{12}N_{2}
Molar mass	148.209 g·mol^{−1}
Appearance	colorless oil
Density	1.044 g/cm^{3}
Boiling point	111 °C (232 °F; 384 K) 3 mm Hg
- Except where otherwise noted, data are given for materials in their standard state (at 25 °C [77 °F], 100 kPa). Infobox references

Nornicotine is an alkaloid with the formula NC_{5}H_{4}−C_{4}H_{7}NH. A colorless oil, it is a significant alkaloid in Nicotiana, the tobacco plant, although less abundant than nicotine. It is structurally similar to nicotine but does not contain a methyl group.

== Biochemical processes ==
In nature, nornicotine is produced by demethylation of nicotine. This process, which requires oxygen, is catalyzed by nicotine N-demethylase, a cytochrome P450.

nornicotine is a precursor to the carcinogen N-nitrosonornicotine that is produced during the curing and processing of tobacco. Nornicotine can react in human saliva to form N-nitrosonornicotine, a known type 1 carcinogen.

== Synthesis ==
There are several routes for the synthesis of nornicotine. One route is the demethylation of nicotine, which can be accomplished by reaction with silver oxide.

$\mathrm{ \xrightarrow[H_2O]{Ag_2O} }$

Another route is the partial reduction of 3-myosmine, which can be accomplished by standard catalytic hydrogenation conditions using palladium as a catalyst or with sodium borohydride. This reaction gives the racemic product.

$\mathrm{ \xrightarrow[H_2]{Pd/C} }$

Nornicotine was first synthesized from nicotine-N-oxide.

== Pharmacology ==
Nornicotine possess high affinity for alpha-6 and alpha-7 subunits of nAChRs. It also inhibits DAT in striatum via nAChR and releases dopamine in rats.
