= Cloud-chasing =

Blowing vapor with an electronic cigarette

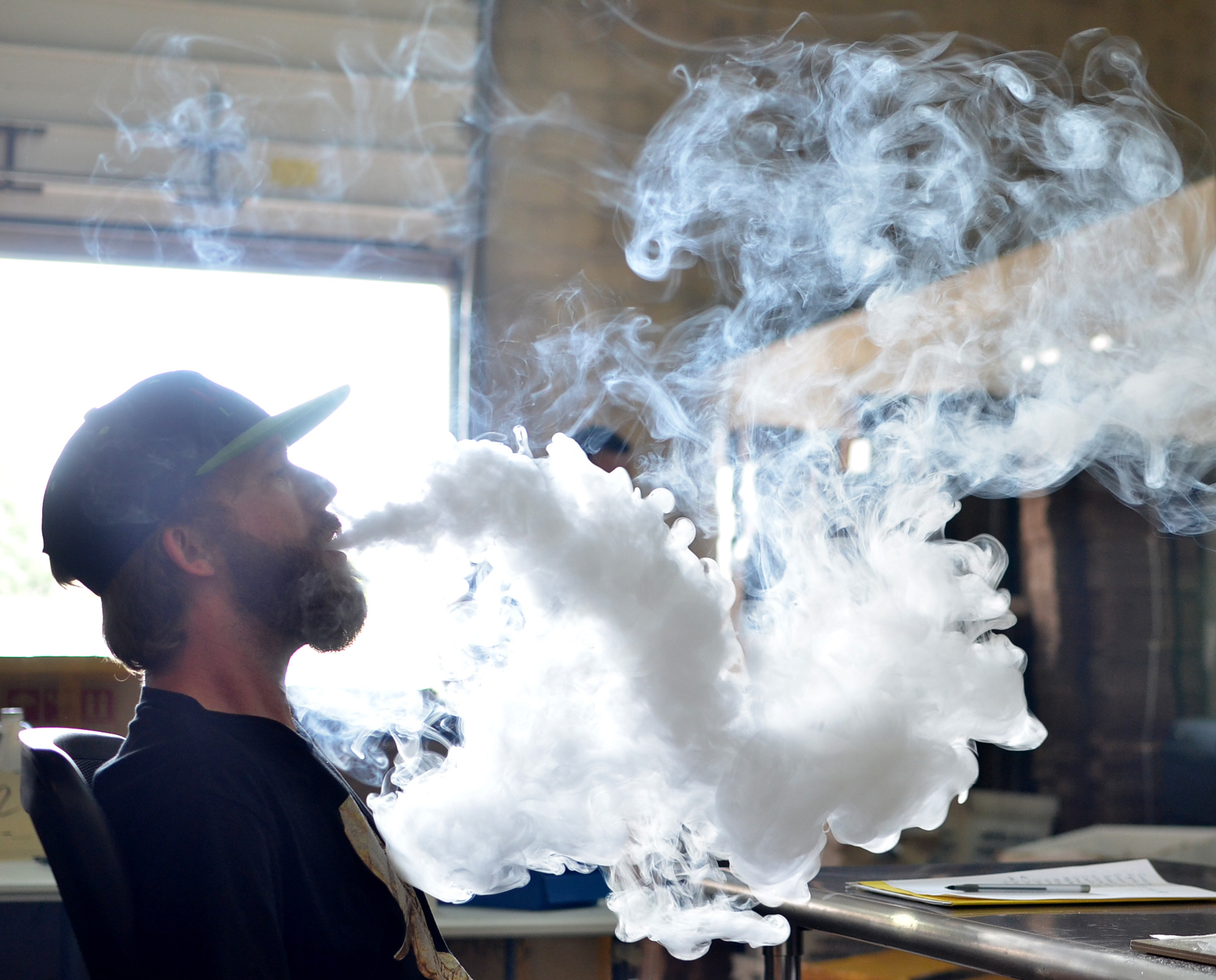
E-cigarette user blowing a cloud of aerosol (vapor).

Cloud-chasing (Note: Cloud-chasing is also variously known as cloud tricks, competitive vaping, extreme vaping, power vaping, public vaping, stunt vaping, sub-ohm vaping, or the "X Games" of vaping.) is the activity of blowing large clouds of vapor using an electronic cigarette. Using the devices for "cloud-chasing" began in the West Coast of the US. The exact origins of the activity are unclear, but most competitive e-cigarette users say that it started around 2012. Competitive vaping is increasing in popularity internationally, spreading from the US and Canada to Indonesia. Cloud-chasing is a recreational activity and a hobby.

Some cloud-chasers known as "professional vapers" take part in cloud-blowing contests in what is called a "cloud competition", competing against one another to exhale the largest and most interesting clouds of vapor, sometimes in shapes. Competitive vaping is attracting spectators, known as "cloud-gazers". There are rules and judges. Cloud-chasing integrates technique, air flow, and using the appropriate technology. A handful of later-generation e-cigarettes are designed to create large plumes of vapor. Most cloud-chasers do not use nicotine. Many choose mixtures that are made without propylene glycol and nicotine, but use higher amounts of glycerin to produce larger plumes of vapor. The majority of vapers go for sub ohm tanks or rebuildable atomizers for producing more vapor.

As vaping comes under increased scrutiny, some members of the vaping community have voiced their concerns about cloud-chasing, claiming the practice gives vapers a bad reputation when doing it in public. Some vapers are concerned that the vaping competitions bring a stigma to vaping by making the activity appear more comparable to gaming activities. Social media sites like YouTube can be used for demonstrating vape tricks. There are vaping tricks competitions. The participants are known as "vaping tricksters".

== History ==
Electronic cigarettes gained popularity in the US in 2007. Using the devices for "cloud-chasing" began in the West Coast of the US. The exact origins of the activity are unclear, but most competitive e-cigarette users say that it started around 2012. This activity appears to be the natural by-product of the growth of the vaping culture. "When automotive manufacturers first started out, they were not thinking about a sport to be called Formula One. You always have groups of people who are looking for excitement," Hon Lik said in respect to cloud-chasing in 2015.

== Health concerns ==
Glycerin was long thought to be a safe option. However, the carcinogen formaldehyde is known as a product of propylene glycol and glycerol vapor degradation.

== Prevalence ==
Social media does have a role in cloud-chasing. The traffic through social media can be significant. It was well publicized around 2014, when sites such as Mashable, Gizmodo, The Guardian, and HuffPost ran featured articles on the activity. In 2015, competitive vaping began increasing in popularity internationally, spreading from the US and Canada to Indonesia. Vaping contests are arranged in many vape trade shows internationally. Most cloud-chasers are male. Most who compete in contests are men. Many cloud-chasers are young teens. In 2015, the competitions were becoming a routine event at local vape shops. Many vape shops organize cloud-chasing events. Some vape shops believe it is overdoing it to organize cloud-chasing competitions at vape shops. Some vape shops lets minors watch cloud-chasing competitions even though they are not allowed to compete in the contests. Cloud-chasing contests appear to be intended to bring in new shoppers and increase e-cigarette business. Contests have also been held at local strip malls, such as in Texas and New Jersey. Since 2015, almost half of vaping trade show organizations promote contests such as cloud-chasing.

== Recreational activity ==
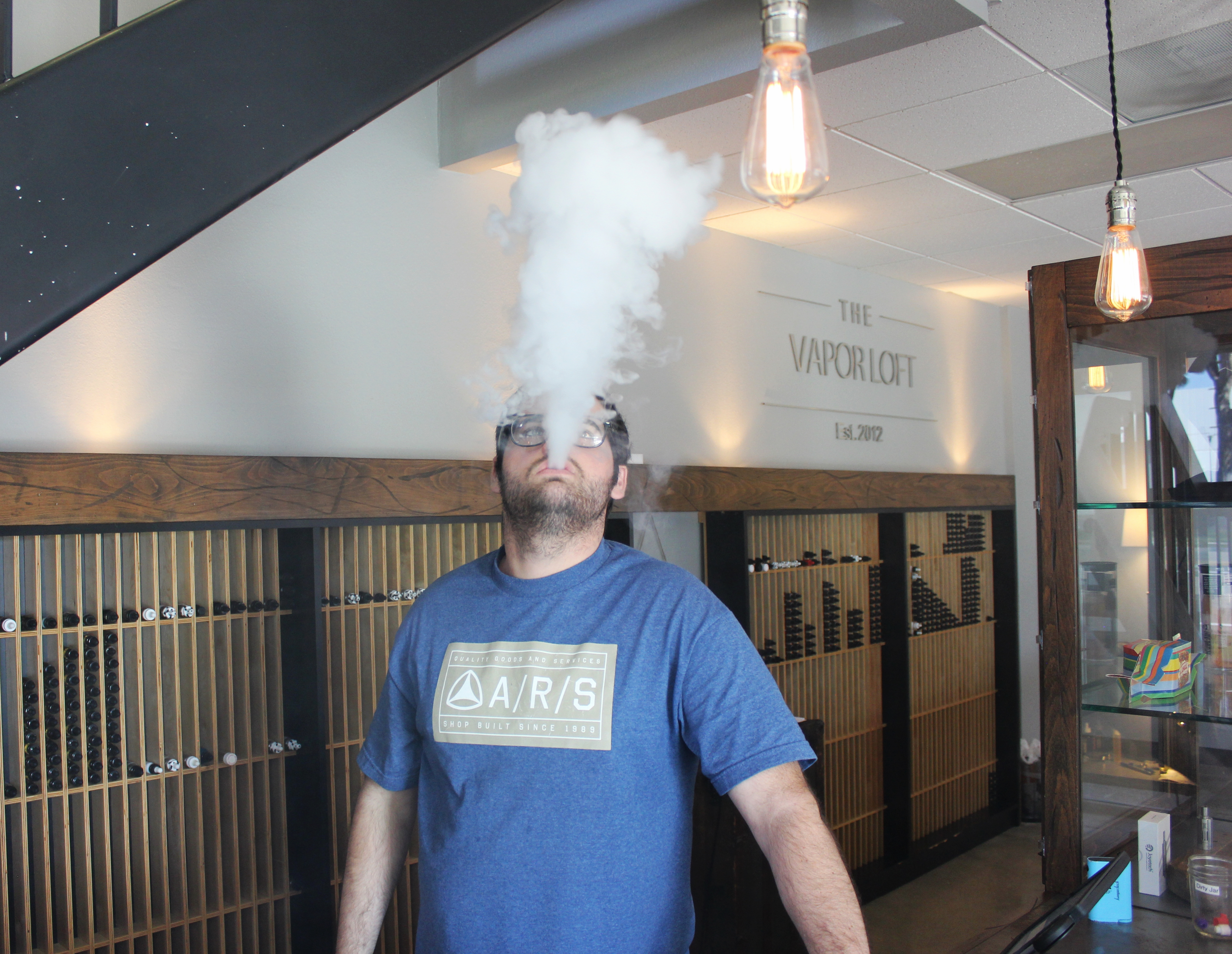
E-cigarette user blowing a cloud of vapor.

Vapers who enjoy blowing large plumes of vapor are known as cloud-chasers. Cloud-chasing is a recreational activity and a hobby. It is popular with many e-cigarette users. There are extensive gatherings of e-cigarette users, known as "vape meets", where participants exchange devices and flavors. Where there are vape meets, e-cigarette users exhibit their customized mod devices. Vape meets are organized by people and businesses. There are large, tiny, local, and national vape meets. Many vape meets include cloud-chasing contests and vaping tricks. Some cloud-chasers demonstrate their skill where anybody can notice. They use devices designed to produce larger amounts of vapor. There are hundreds of YouTube videos showing people engaging in blowing clouds of vapor using e-cigarettes. YouTube is flooded with advice for creating large clouds of vapor.

Others have been known as "flavor aficionados" who seek the ideal e-liquid and can determine a liquid by its aroma. As e-cigarette use has increased, it has attracted many flavor aficionados in the US. It is frequent to notice flavor aficionados put a small amount of e-liquid on their hand for a speedy taste test. They assert to be capable of determining the difference between "gourmet" e-liquid and commercially promoted e-liquid. Some flavor aficionados are okay with large clouds coupled with full flavor, while others think it is foolish.

== Competitions ==
=== Cloud-chasers ===
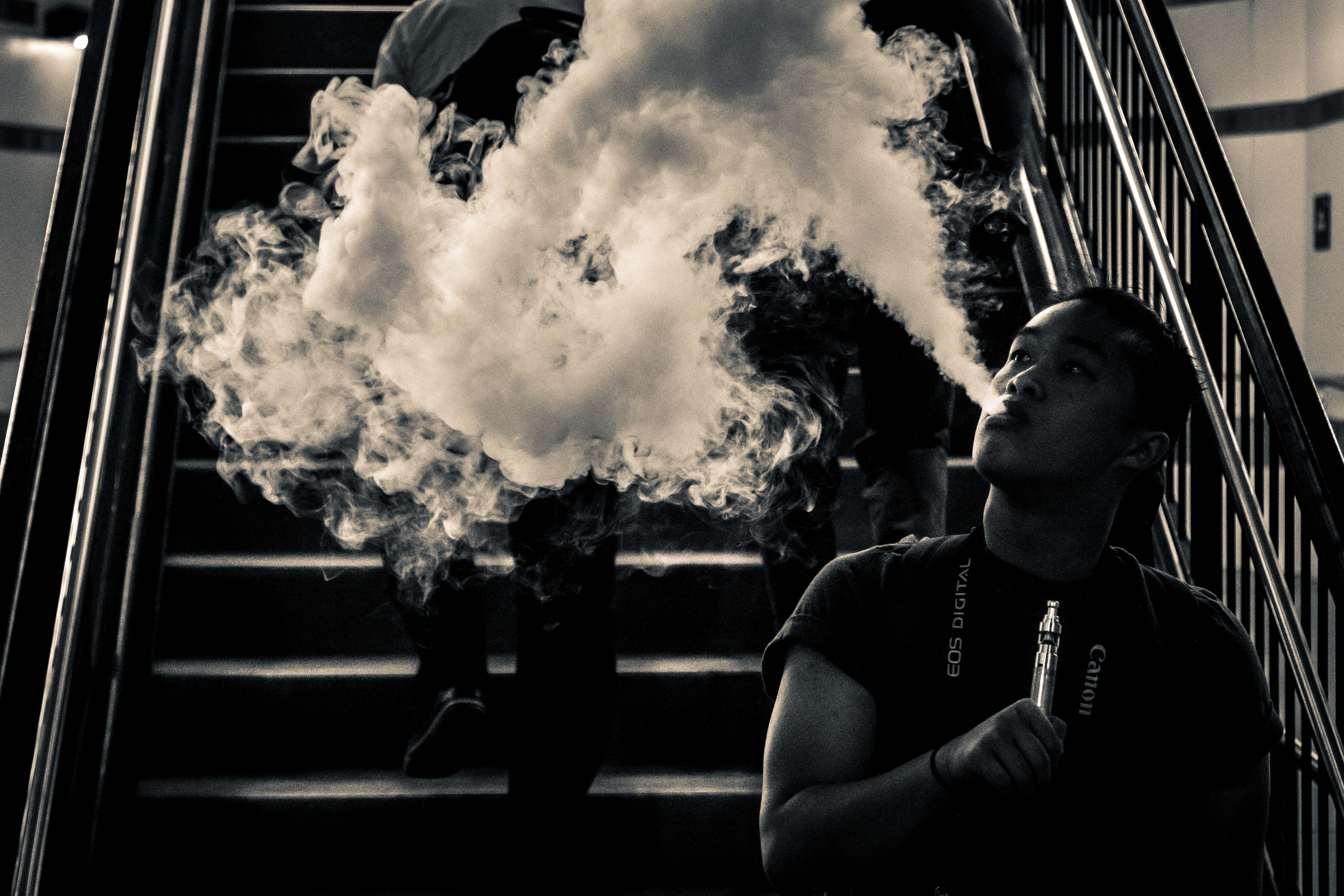
Cloud-chasers aim to exhale large or aesthetically interesting clouds of vapor

Some cloud-chasers known as "professional vapers" take part in cloud-blowing contests in what is a called a "cloud competition", competing against one another to exhale the largest and most interesting clouds of vapor, sometimes in shapes such as rings, balls, streams, or ripples, or doing tricks like the French inhale. The French inhale is exhaling the vapor out of the mouth and inhaling it into the nose at the same time, forming a cloud over the upper lip. Men and women participate in cloud competitions. Many teenagers participate in cloud competitions. Competitive vaping is attracting spectators, known as "cloud-gazers".

=== Events ===
Two major cloud competitions in the US are the International Cloud Championships in California, and the World Series of Vape, in Las Vegas. The World Series of Cloud Chasing contest took place in the UK in 2016. The Vape Capitol Cloud Championships is one of the largest cloud contests in the US. There are also competitions in New Jersey, Illinois, New Mexico, and at the Vaporium in New York. The Vape Olympics is an annual event that began 2015. The Canadian Cloud Circuit began in Ontario, Canada in 2015. VapeShow Prague took place in the Czech Republic in 2017. Some consider it to be a sport and it has gotten more formal over time. Competitors can win prize money typically in the range of $250 to $2,000. The World Vaping Championship has a total prize purse of $100,000. Some regional contests offer cash winnings. E-cigarette companies will frequently pay e-cigarette users who have demonstrated themselves makers of amazing clouds. Tournaments are commonly sponsored by e-cigarette companies. Some competitors are sponsored by e-cigarette companies. This counteracts travel and equipment expenses. There are also teams. Some sponsors are organizing teams. A Competitive Vaping League is being developed. Several vape shops in Dallas, North Carolina, Los Angeles, Canada, and Indonesia are beginning to host competitions in order to promote new e-liquid flavors.

=== Rules ===
There are rules and judges. A list of rules are explained on a number of websites. Vapers compete by standing back-to-back when blowing the cloud of vapor. The clouds of vapor are evaluated on "girth, length, and overall size density". The person who exhales the larger cloud of vapor moves on to the next meeting. The cloud of vapor is measured using a yardstick or by a ruler on the wall next to the competitor. In Plano, Texas in 2015, the cloud of vapor reached about 5 feet. The cloud was measured at 6 feet from another vaper. The judge Matt Maynard said, "There is a skill to being able to keep a ball of vapor together without it dissipating."

== Usage ==
=== Customization ===
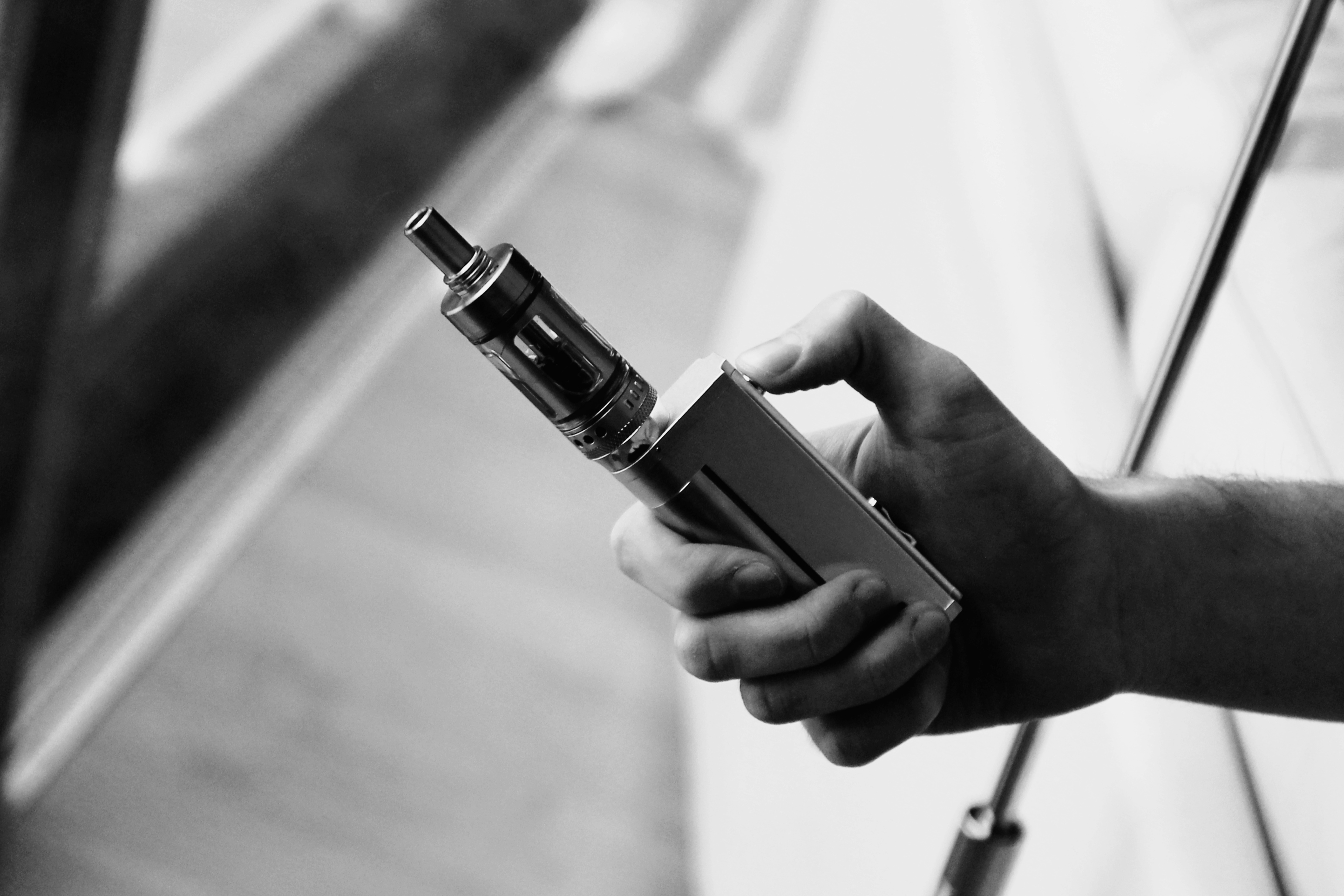
A customized mod e-cigarette device designed for cloud-chasing.

Cloud-chasing integrates technique, air flow, and using the appropriate technology. A handful of later-generation e-cigarettes are designed to create large plumes of vapor. The devices are customized. Users experiment with numerous component combinations. A growing subclass of e-cigarette enthusiasts called cloud-chasers assemble their atomizers in such a way that can produce extremely large amounts of vapor by using heating coils with a resistance of less than 1 ohm (Ω).

E-cigarette blogs recommend various configurations of batteries and various kinds of e-liquid to generate the largest vapor or do the greatest tricks. Vapers on Reddit, vaping forums, and blogs have indicated there is a risk associated with modifying an e-cigarette to generate more vapor. By using a coil with very low resistance, the batteries used can be stressed beyond the margins of what could be considered safe use. This could present a risk of dangerous battery failures. If an unregulated mod is not set up correctly the battery could overheat. "Unless you are an expert in electrical engineering it's probably better to stick to regulated mods," according to reporter Alex Cranz. A higher resistance above 0.1 ohms is recommended for onlookers and user safety.

Cloud-chasers are not always interested in the nicotine released from the vapor. Most cloud-chasers do not use nicotine. Many choose mixtures that are made without propylene glycol and nicotine, but use higher amounts of glycerin to produce larger plumes of vapor. Dripping, where the liquid is dripped directly onto the atomizer, seems to be the preferred option among vapers who take part in smoke tricks, including cloud-chasing. Youth state that they do not use e-liquids containing nicotine while doing vaping tricks. Professor Fiona Measham, who led a smoking-related research project stated, "Among some more experienced vapers who prioritise competency in 'cloud chasing' skills, nicotine is actively avoided as it could disrupt their vaping 'performances', particularly given the quantities consumed". Vape shops in the US have held classes to teach users how to build an e-cigarette that can generate large clouds of vapor.

=== Vapor production ===
The majority of vapers go for sub ohm tanks or rebuildable atomizers for producing more vapor. Cig-a-likes generate considerably less vapor compared to customized mods. Customized mods generate considerably more vapor compared to basic 'eGo' type devices. A higher power setting by using a variable voltage device increases vapor volume. Increasing airflow over the coil increasing vapor output. This requires an atomizer with an adjustable airflow. For vapers using sub ohm tanks or rebuildables with plenty of airflow, inhaling kind of quickly gets better results from the airflow. When the airflow is opened too much it creates thin and weak vapor. The way the vaper inhales can affect the vapor being created. Before exhaling cloud-chasers inhale directly into the lungs as opposed to mouth-to-lung inhaling by most vapers.

== Debate ==
As vaping comes under increased scrutiny, some members of the vaping community have voiced their concerns about cloud-chasing, claiming the practice gives vapers a bad reputation when doing it in public. Long-term vapers maintain that some vaping newbies are making the industry's image look bad by exhaling large clouds in public. Some vapers are concerned that the vaping competitions bring a stigma to vaping by making the activity appear more comparable to gaming activities. Some vapers believe that cloud-chasers are partly responsible for the negative media attention. Many vapers believe that cloud-chasers gives vaping a negative reputation, resulting in increased public opinion for regulation. Selena Rockwell, working for the Council on Alcohol & Drug Abuse said "That's very concerning because it turns it more into a game." Cheryl Richter, the financial secretary of the National Vapers Club said that "it gives vaping a bad name, and we don't need negative publicity." Though, cloud-chasers dismiss the naysayers.

Some restaurants and bars have banned e-cigarette use. Others permit e-cigarette use but do not allow cloud-chasing. Many vapers openly condemn the activity, saying that those who attempt to blow the large amount of vapor indoors will lead to those who are still doubtful about vaping to support restricting their use. In 2016 the US Department of Transportation prohibited vaping, including cloud-chasing, on commercial flights.

== Related practices ==
=== Vape tricks ===
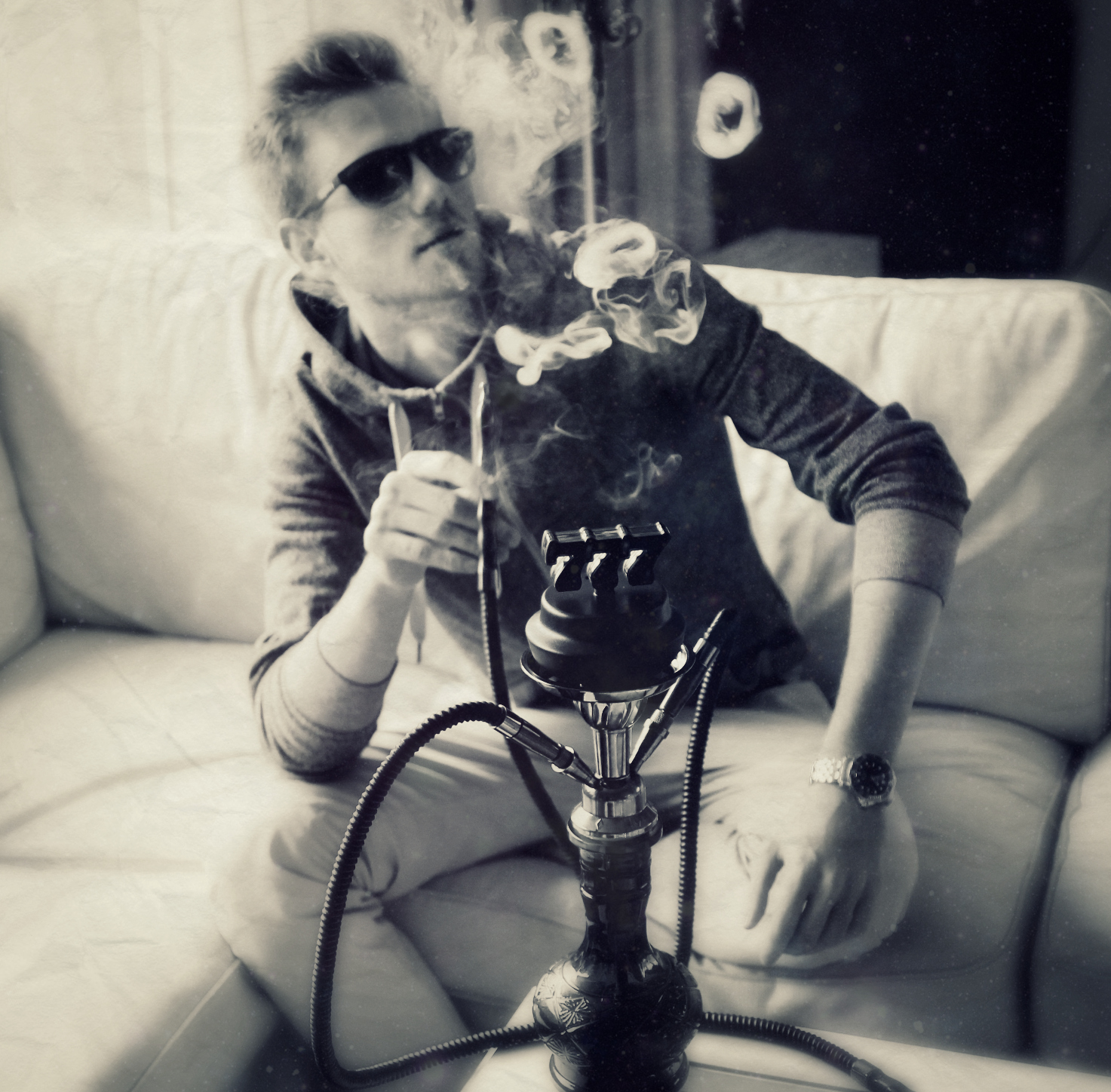
Vaping trick known as the smoke ring.

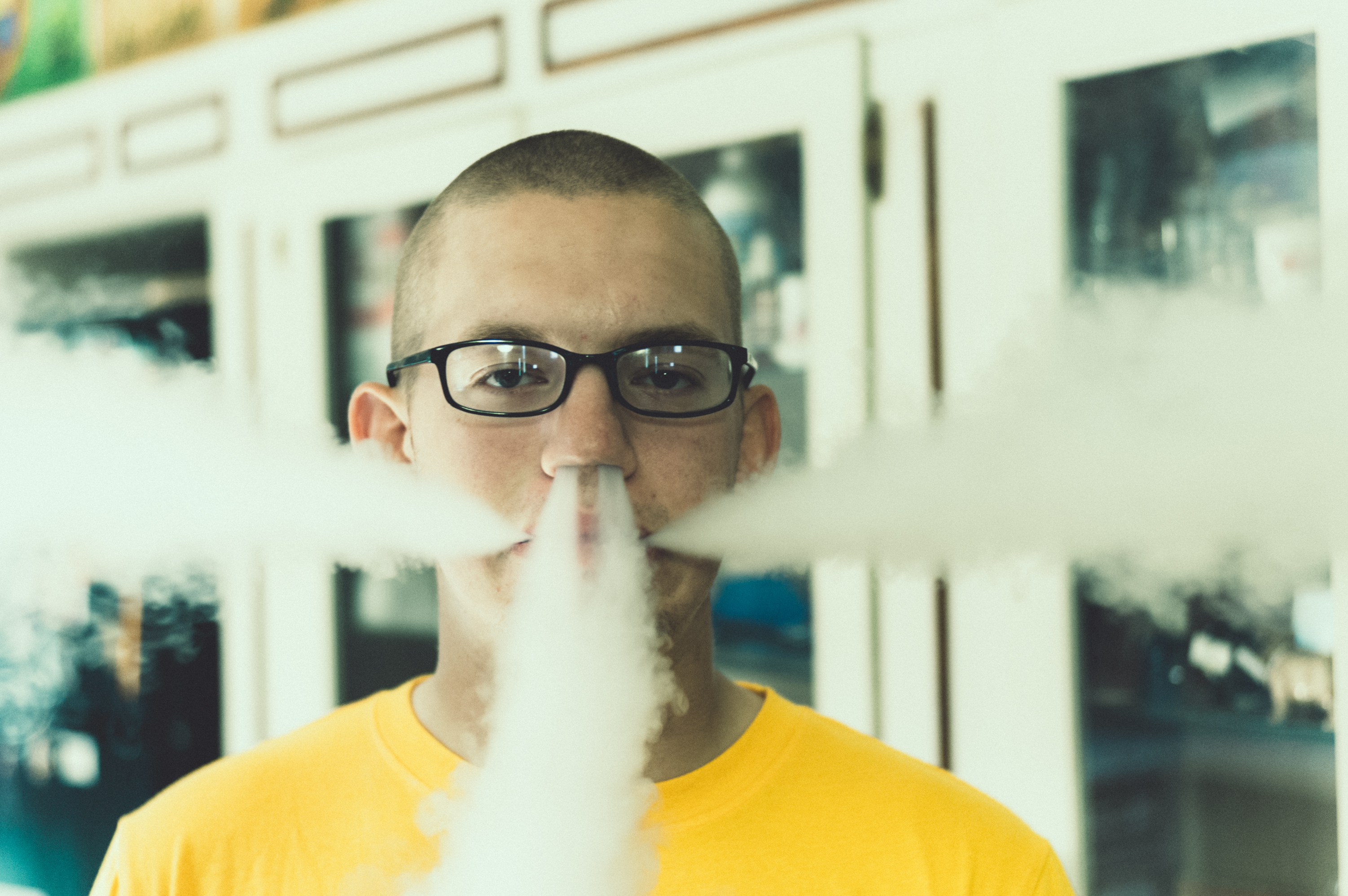
Vaping trick known as the dragon.

The exhaling methods used to produce smoke rings while smoking can be employed to produce rings of aerosol while vaping. Men and women use e-cigarettes to take part in various vape tricks. Teenagers use e-cigarettes to take part in tricks like blowing O's, smoke rings, tornado-like funnels, the dragon, and various other vape tricks. Several young adults said that one of the reasons they vape is for doing tricks. Doing tricks is one of the main reasons teens said they vape. The dragon is exhaling vapor out of the nose and mouth at the same time. Other tricks include the double lasso, jellyfish, and the "Push the O" move. The double lasso begins with exhaling an O shape around a foot in diameter. Then a smaller, quicker O up to a size of a doughnut goes through the original O, followed by a smaller O is blown through the first two O's. The jellyfish is blowing smoke rings within smoke rings. The "Push the O" move is exhaling a smoke ring and pushing it aside with their hands. E-cigarette users also form "vortexes" by tapping their devices to form sparkles. Another vaping trick is called "a waterfall". This trick involves exhaling the vapor out of the mouth and then inhaling it in through the nose. Most vaping tricks are carried out using devices with large batteries.

=== Prevalence ===
Vaping tricks performed by tricksters are publicized via social media, vape meets, and other places. There are a number of YouTube videos showing people engaging in vape tricks using e-cigarettes. Social media sites like Instagram can be used for showing off vape tricks. One of the more alluring features about vaping was cloud-chasing among Instagram users. Teenagers are being taught vaping tricks from one another. Students put videos on social media that show them performing tricks using e-cigarettes. Adolescents eagerly check out e-cigarettes on social media and YouTube where they find out about vaping tricks, among other things. The increase in popularity with vape tricks is attributed to many e-cigarette users in Southern California who posted their tricks on social media online.

=== Competitions ===
There are vaping tricks competitions. The participants are known as "vaping tricksters". There are several different types of trickster; the most common names being the Bender, the Runner, and the Spammer. Benders stay put in one place and use their body parts to transform the vape they exhale into various shapes. Runners typically do not stay put, and move in the direction of the vapor to form various shapes. Spammers specialize in creating multiple O's. The League of Clouds event is an online vaping trick contest that took place in 2016. The contestants at a place they prefer were livestreaming their actions on camera at a specified time, while judges at different places made their ruling online. In April 2017 Austin Lawrence, also known as "The Vape God", created "some of the most insane and complicated smoke rings ever captured on film", according to Maxim. Titus Edwards is known in the vaping community as Vape King for his vaping cloud skills, according to FLUX. His signature maneuver is the jellyfish. Vaping tricksters have been sponsored by e-liquid brands.
