= Tobacco-specific nitrosamines =

Class of carcinogens in tobacco products

Tobacco-specific nitrosamines (TSNAs) comprise one of the most important groups of carcinogens in tobacco products, particularly cigarettes (traditional and electronic) and fermented dipping snuff.

== Background ==
These nitrosamine carcinogens are formed from nicotine and related compounds by a nitrosation reaction that occurs during the curing and processing of tobacco. Essentially the plant's natural alkaloids combine with nitrate forming the nitrosamines.

They are called tobacco-specific nitrosamines because they are found only in tobacco products, and possibly in some other nicotine-containing products. The tobacco-specific nitrosamines are present in cigarette smoke and to a lesser degree in "smokeless" tobacco products such as dipping tobacco and chewing tobacco; additional information has shown that trace amounts of NNN and NNK have been detected in e-cigarettes. They are present in trace amounts in snus. They are important carcinogens in cigarette smoke, along with combustion products and other carcinogens.

Among the tobacco-specific nitrosamines, nicotine-derived nitrosamine ketone (NNK) and N-nitrosonornicotine (NNN) are the most carcinogenic. Others include N′-nitrosoanatabine (NAT) and N-nitrosoanabasine (NAB). NNK and its metabolite 4-(methylnitrosamino)-1-(3-pyridyl)-1-butanol (NNAL) are potent systemic lung carcinogens in rats. Tumors of the nasal cavity, liver, and pancreas are also observed in NNK- or NNAL-treated rats. NNN is an effective esophageal carcinogen in the rat, and induces respiratory tract tumors in mice, hamsters, and mink. A mixture of NNK and NNN caused oral tumors when swabbed in the rat oral cavity. Thus, considerable evidence supports the role of tobacco-specific nitrosamines as important causative factors for cancers of the lung, pancreas, esophagus, and oral cavity in people who use tobacco products.

Metabolism and chemical binding to DNA (adduct formation) are critical in cancer induction by NNK and NNN.

Human metabolism of NNK and NNN varies widely from individual to individual, and current research is attempting to identify those individuals who are particularly sensitive to the carcinogenic effects of these compounds. Such individuals would be at higher risk for cancer when they use tobacco products or are exposed to secondhand smoke. Identification of high-risk individuals could lead to improved methods of prevention of tobacco-related cancer, and improved risk valuation for insurers.

== See also ==
- Polycyclic aromatic hydrocarbons, also found in cigarette smoke
- Nicotine
