= N-Nitrosonornicotine =

Names
- Preferred IUPAC name 3-[(2S)-1-Nitrosopyrrolidin-2-yl]pyridine

Identifiers
CAS Number	16543-55-8
3D model (JSmol)	Interactive image
Abbreviations	NNN
ChemSpider	19957766
ECHA InfoCard	100.230.123
KEGG	C16452
PubChem CID	27919
UNII	X656TZ86DX
CompTox Dashboard (EPA)	DTXSID4021476
- InChI: InChI=1S/C9H11N3O/c13-11-12-6-2-4-9(12)8-3-1-5-10-7-8/h1,3,5,7,9H,2,4,6H2/t9-/m0/s1 Key: XKABJYQDMJTNGQ-VIFPVBQESA-N; InChI=1/C9H11N3O/c13-11-12-6-2-4-9(12)8-3-1-5-10-7-8/h1,3,5,7,9H,2,4,6H2/t9-/m0/s1 Key: XKABJYQDMJTNGQ-VIFPVBQEBO
- SMILES: O=NN2CCC[C@H]2c1cnccc1

Properties
Chemical formula	C_{9}H_{11}N_{3}O
Molar mass	177.207 g·mol^{−1}
Appearance	Oily yellow liquid
Melting point	47 °C (117 °F; 320 K)
Boiling point	154 °C (309 °F; 427 K)
Solubility in water	Soluble

Hazards
Flash point	177 °C (351 °F; 450 K)
- Except where otherwise noted, data are given for materials in their standard state (at 25 °C [77 °F], 100 kPa). verify (what is ?) Infobox references

N-Nitrosonornicotine (NNN) is a tobacco-specific nitrosamine produced during the curing and processing of tobacco.

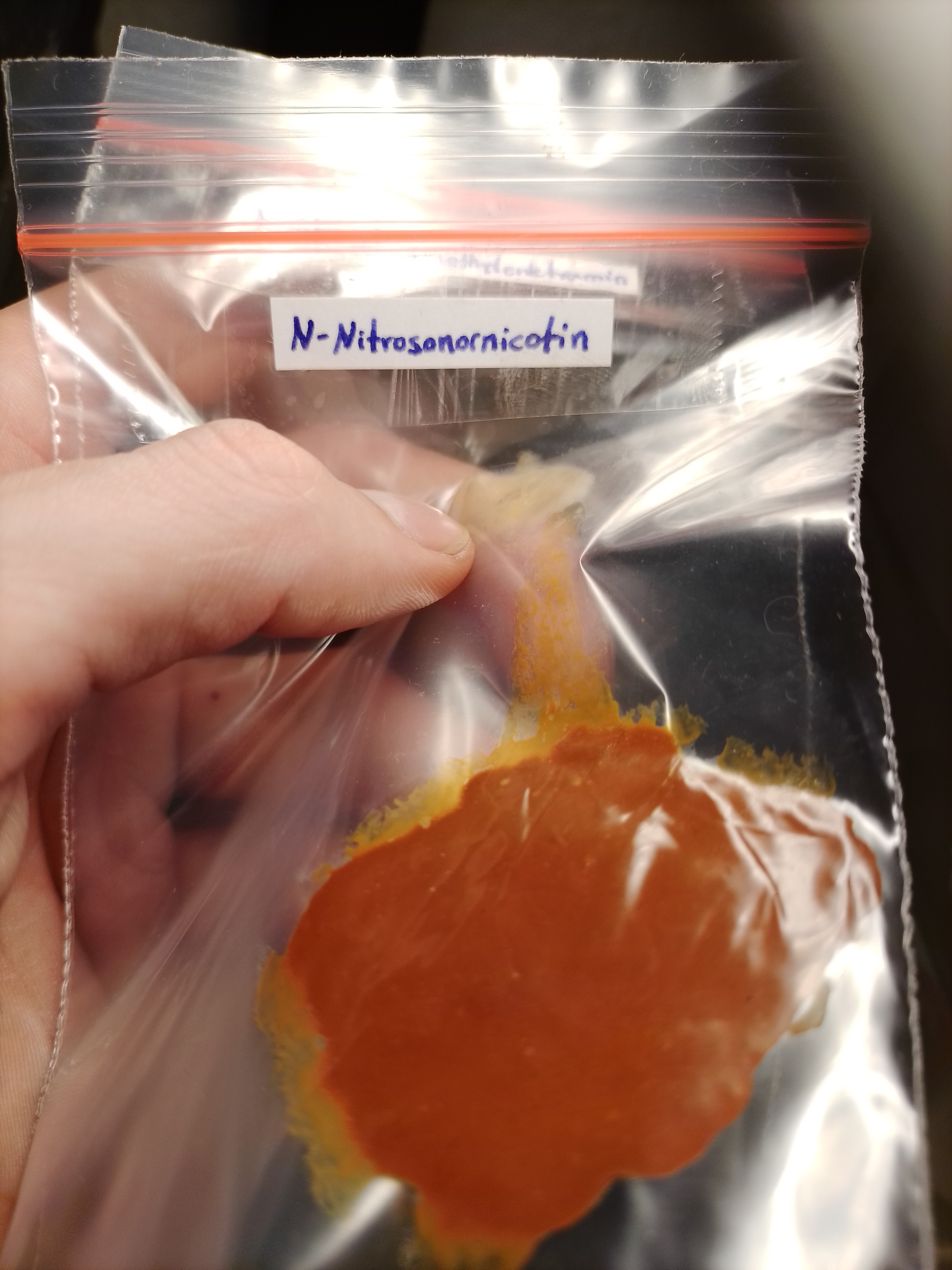
NNN from synthesis of nicotine and nitrous acid.

== Toxicity ==
It has been classified as a Group 1 carcinogen. Although no adequate studies of the relationship between exposure to NNN and human cancer have been reported, there is sufficient evidence that NNN causes cancer in experimental animals.

== Sources ==
NNN is found in a variety of tobacco products including smokeless tobacco like chewing tobacco and snuff, cigarettes, and cigars. It is present in smoke from cigars and cigarettes, in the saliva of people who chew betel quid with tobacco, and in the saliva of oral-snuff and e-cigarette users. NNN is produced by the nitrosation of nornicotine during the curing, aging, processing, and smoking of tobacco. Roughly half of the NNN originates in the unburnt tobacco, with the remainder being formed during burning.

NNN can be produced in the acidic environment of the stomach in users of oral nicotine replacement therapies, due to the combination of dietary/endogenous nitrates, and nornicotine (either present as a minor metabolite of nicotine, or as an impurity in the product).

== Mechanism of action ==
NNN is metabolized by cytochrome P450, which adds a hydroxy group to either the 2' or 5' carbon on the 5-membered ring. 2'-hydroxylation appears more prevalent in humans, while 5'-hydroxylation is more prevalent in non-primate animals. Upon hydroxylation, the 5-membered ring opens up, allowing the compound to bind to the base of one of the nucleotides.

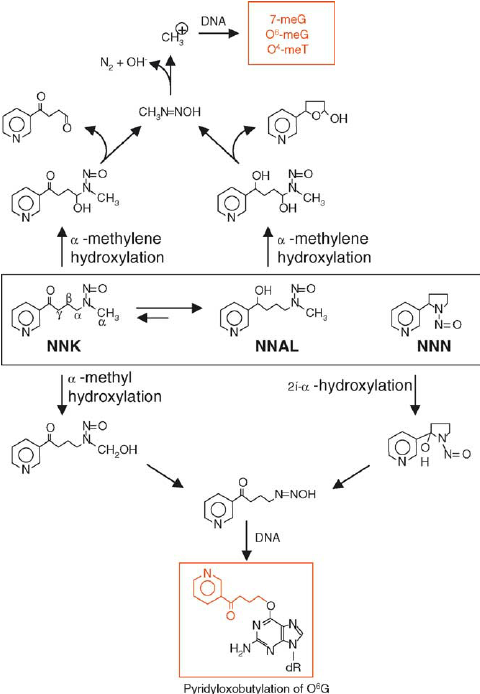

== Synthesis ==
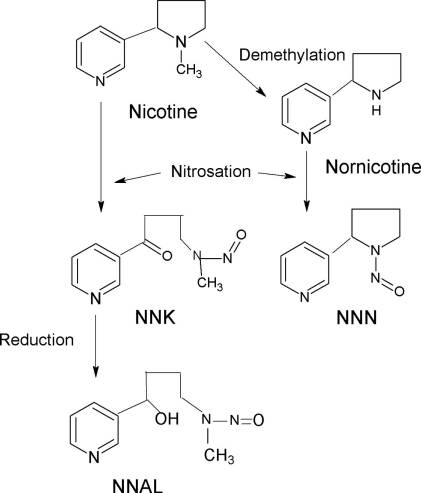

NNN is a derivative of nicotine that is produced in the curing of tobacco, in the burning of tobacco (such as with cigarettes), and in the acidic conditions of the stomach. Nicotine is converted into nornicotine via nicotine N-demethylase (NND), an enzyme found in the tobacco plant that works by removing the methyl group from the nitrogen on the 5-membered ring of nicotine. From there, Nornicotine undergoes nitrosation (the conversion of organic compounds into nitroso derivatives by gaining a nitrosonium (N=O) group) on that same nitrogen, converting it to NNN.

The nitrosonium group forms from nitrous acid (HNO_{2}) under acidic conditions present in the tobacco curing process. It can also be formed in the stomach when stomach acid reacts with nitrite ions that are typically used as a salt to preserve red meats and inhibit bacterial growth. Nitrous acid becomes protonated on its hydroxy group to form nitrosooxonium. This compound then splits off to form nitrosonium and water.

== Symptoms ==
Symptoms of NNN exposure are similar to those of nicotine poisoning and include irritation at the point of absorption (for example, the gums when dipping tobacco is used), nausea and vomiting, sleep disturbances, headache, and chest pain. The substance is also a known carcinogen, meaning that any exposure to the substance can lead to cancer and is proven to cause esophageal and nasal cancer in animals. There is no known "safe" levels of NNN ingestion in humans due to its carcinogenic activity. However, in mice, the median lethal dose (LD_{50}) is 1g/kg.

In cigarette smoke, NNN has been found in levels between 2.2 and 6.6 parts per million (ppm). The FDA has put limits of nitrosamines in other consumable products (such as cured meats) at levels below 10 parts per billion (ppb).
