= NNK =

Nicotine-derived nitrosone (NNK)

Names
- Preferred IUPAC name Methyl[4-oxo-4-(pyridin-3-yl)butyl]nitrous amide
- Other names N-Nitrosonornicotine ketone; 4-(Methylnitrosamino)-1-(3-pyridyl)-1-butanone

Identifiers
CAS Number	64091-91-4
3D model (JSmol)	Interactive image
Beilstein Reference	3548355
ChEBI	CHEBI:32692
ChEMBL	ChEMBL2311069
ChemSpider	43038
ECHA InfoCard	100.164.147
KEGG	C16453
PubChem CID	47289
UNII	7S395EDO61
UN number	2811
CompTox Dashboard (EPA)	DTXSID3020881
- InChI: InChI=1S/C10H13N3O2/c1-13(12-15)7-3-5-10(14)9-4-2-6-11-8-9/h2,4,6,8H,3,5,7H2,1H3 Key: FLAQQSHRLBFIEZ-UHFFFAOYSA-N
- SMILES: CN(CCCC(=O)c1cccnc1)N=O

Properties
Chemical formula	C_{10}H_{13}N_{3}O_{2}
Molar mass	207.233 g·mol^{−1}

Hazards
- GHS labelling
Pictograms	(GHS06: Toxic) (GHS07: Exclamation mark) (GHS08: Health hazard)
Signal word	Danger
Hazard statements	H301, H302, H317, H351
Precautionary statements	P201, P202, P261, P264, P270, P272, P280, P281, P301+P310, P301+P312, P302+P352, P308+P313, P321, P330, P333+P313, P363, P405, P501
- Except where otherwise noted, data are given for materials in their standard state (at 25 °C [77 °F], 100 kPa). verify (what is ?) Infobox references

Nicotine-derived nitrosamine ketone (NNK) is one of the key tobacco-specific nitrosamines (TSNAs) derived from nicotine. It plays an important role in carcinogenesis. The conversion of nicotine to NNK entails opening of the pyrrolidine ring.

== Synthesis and occurrence ==
NNK can be produced by standard methods of organic synthesis.

=== Tobacco ===
NNK is both found in cured tobacco and produced during its burning (pyrolysis). The amount delivered in cigarette smoke ranged from 30 to 280 ng per cigarette in one study and 12 to 110 ng per cigarette in another.

Sun-cured ("Oriental") tobaccos contain very little NNK and other TSNAs due to being grown in low-nitrate soil, lack of nitrate fertilizer, and sun-curing. Flue-cured tobacco ("Virginia" tobacco), especially when cured using an open flame, contains most of the NNK in American blended tobaccos, although Marlboro's "Virginia blend" had the lowest levels of NNK per nicotine out of many tested, with the exception of Natural American Spirit.

=== e-Cigarettes ===
e-Cigarettes do not convert nicotine to NNK due to their lower operating temperatures. The amount of NNK delivered by e-cigarettes reaches 2.8 ng per 15 puffs (approximately 1 cigarette). NNK was found in 89% of Korean e-cigarette liquids. Concentrations range from 0.22 to 9.84 μg/L. For the product that had the highest amount, if 1 ml is equivalent to 20 cigarettes, there would be 9.84/20 = 0.5 ng NNK per e-cig cigarette dose. Cigarettes with 1 gram of tobacco average about 350 ng.

== Biology ==
=== Metabolism ===
NNK is a procarcinogen that needs activation to exert its effects. The activation is done by enzymes of the cytochrome pigment (CYP) multigene family. These enzymes catalyze hydroxylation reactions. Besides the CYP family, NNK can also be activated by metabolic genes, like myeloperoxidase (MPO) and epoxide hydrolase (EPHX1). NNK can be activated by two different routes, the oxidative path and the reductive path. In the oxidative metabolism NNK undergoes an α-hydroxylation catalyzed by cytochrome P450. This reaction can occur by two pathways, α-methylhydroxylation or by α-methylenehydroxylation. Both pathways produce the carcinogenic metabolized isoform of NNK, NNAL.

In the reductive metabolism NNK undergoes either a carbonyl reduction or a pyridine N-oxidation, both producing NNAL.

NNAL can be detoxified by glucuronidation, producing non-carcinogenic compounds known as NNAL-Glucs. The glucuronidation can take place on the oxygen next to the ring (NNAL-O-Gluc), or on the nitrogen inside the ring(NNAL-N-Gluc). NNAL-Glucs are then excreted by the kidneys into the urine.

=== Signaling pathways ===
Once NNK is activated, it initiates a cascade of signaling pathways (for example ERK1/2, NF-κB, PI3K/Akt, MAPK, FasL, K-Ras), resulting in uncontrolled cellular proliferation and tumorigenesis.

NNK activates μ en m-calpain kinase, which induces lung metastasis via the ERK1/2 pathway. This pathway upregulates cellular myelocytomatosis (c-Myc) and B cell leukemia/lymphoma 2 (Bcl-2), in which the two oncoproteins are involved in cellular proliferation, transformation and apoptosis. NNK also promotes cell survival via phosphorylation, with cooperation of c-Myc and Bcl-2 causing cellular migration, invasion and uncontrolled proliferation.

The ERK1/2 pathway also phosphorylates NF-κB causing an upregulation of cyclin D1, a G1 phase regulator protein. When NNK is present, it directly involves cellular survival dependent on NF-κB. Further studies are needed to better understand NNK cellular pathways of NF-κB.

The phosphoinositide 3-kinase (PI3K/Akt) pathway is also an important contributor to NNK-induced cellular transformations and metastasis. This process ensures the proliferation and survival of tumorigenic cells. The ERK1/2 and Akt pathways show consequential changes in levels of protein expression as a result of NNK-activation in the cells, but further research is needed to fully understand the mechanism of NNK-activated pathways.

== Pathology ==
=== Toxicity ===
NNK is a known mutagen, which means it causes polymorphisms in the human genome. Studies showed that NNK induced gene polymorphisms in cells that involve in cell growth, proliferation and differentiation. There are multiple NNK dependent routes that involve cell proliferation. One example is the cell route that coordinates the downregulation of retinoic acid receptor beta (RAR-β). Studies showed that with a 100 mg/kg dose of NNK, several point mutations were formed in the RAR-β gene, inducing tumorigenesis in the lungs.

Other genes affected by NNK include sulfotransferase 1A1 (SULT1A1), transforming growth factor beta (TGF-β), and angiotensin II (AT2).

NNK plays a very important role in gene silencing, modification, and functional disruption which induce carcinogenesis.

=== Inhibition ===
Chemical compounds derived from cruciferous vegetables and EGCG inhibit lung tumorigenesis by NNK in animal models. Whether these effects have any relevance to human health is unknown and is a subject of ongoing research.

== See also ==
- Toxification
