= California Proposition 65 list of chemicals =

Chemicals regulated in the United States

The following is a list of chemicals published as a requirement of Safe Drinking Water and Toxic Enforcement Act of 1986, commonly known as California Proposition 65, that are "known to the state to cause cancer or reproductive toxicity" as of January 3, 2020. As a result of lawsuits, the list also contains substances known only to cause cancer in animals.

This list is not exhaustive, as the complete list contains over 900 chemicals.

== Chemicals currently listed under California Proposition 65 ==
Current Proposition 65 list
Substance	Reason	CAS Registry Number †	Date Listed
A-alpha-C (2-Amino-9H-pyrido[2,3-b]indole)	Cancer	26148-68-5	January 1, 1990
1,4-Dichloro-2-nitrobenzene	Cancer	89-61-2	September 13, 2019
p-chloro-α,α,α-trifluorotoluene (para-Chlorobenzotrifluoride, PCBTF)	Cancer	98-56-6	June 28, 2019
Bevacizumab	Developmental Reproductive toxicity (female, male)	216974-75-3	March 8, 2019
Aflatoxins	Cancer	---	January 1, 1988
Ceramic fibers (airborne particles of respirable size)	Cancer	---	February 27, 1987
Certain combined chemotherapy for lymphomas	Cancer	---	February 27, 1987
para-Nitroanisole	Cancer	100-17-4	September 13, 2019
2,4-Dichloro-1-nitrobenzene	Cancer	611-06-3	September 13, 2019
Δ^{9}-Tetrahydrocannabinol (Δ^{9}-THC)	Developmental		January 3, 2020
2-Chloronitrobenzene	Cancer	88-73-3	September 13, 2019
2-Amino-4-chlorophenol	Cancer	95-85-2	September 13, 2019
Cannabis (marijuana) smoke	Developmental	---	January 3, 2020
Abiraterone acetate	Developmental Reproductive toxicity (female, male)	154229-18-2	April 8, 2016
Acetaldehyde	Cancer	75-07-0	April 1, 1988
Acetamide	Cancer	60-35-5	January 1, 1990
Acetazolamide	Developmental	59-66-5	August 20, 1999
Acetochlor	Cancer	34256-82-1	January 1, 1989
Acetohydroxamic acid	Developmental	546-88-3	April 1, 1990
2-Acetylaminofluorene	Cancer	53-96-3	July 1, 1987
Acifluorfen sodium	Cancer	62476-59-9	January 1, 1990
Acrylamide	Cancer Developmental Reproductive toxicity (male)	79-06-1	January 1, 1990 February 25, 2011
Acrylonitrile	Cancer	107-13-1	July 1, 1987
Actinomycin D	Cancer Developmental	50-76-0	October 1, 1989 October 1, 1992
AF-2 ([2-(2-furyl)-3-(5-nitro-2-furyl)]acrylamide)	Cancer	3688-53-7	July 1, 1987
Alachlor	Cancer	15972-60-8	January 1, 1989
Alcoholic beverages Alcoholic beverages, when associated with alcohol abuse	Cancer	---	April 29, 2011 July 1, 1988
Aldrin	Cancer	309-00-2	July 1, 1988
All-trans retinoic acid	Developmental	302-79-4	January 1, 1989
Aloe vera, non-decolorized whole leaf extract	Cancer	–	December 4, 2015
Alprazolam	Developmental	28981-97-7	July 1, 1990
Altretamine	Developmental Reproductive toxicity (male)	645-05-6	August 20, 1999
Amantadine hydrochloride	Developmental	665-66-7	February 27, 2001
Amikacin sulfate	Developmental	39831-55-5	July 1, 1990
2-Aminoanthraquinone	Cancer	117-79-3	October 1, 1989
p-Aminoazobenzene	Cancer	60-09-3	January 1, 1990
o-Aminoazotoluene	Cancer	97-56-3	July 1, 1987
4-Aminobiphenyl (4-amino-diphenyl)	Cancer	92-67-1	February 27, 1987
1-Amino-2,4-dibromoanthraquinone	Cancer	81-49-2	August 26, 1997
3-Amino-9-ethylcarbazole hydrochloride	Cancer	6109-97-3	July 1, 1989
2-Aminofluorene	Cancer	153-78-6	January 29, 1999
Aminoglutethimide	Developmental	125-84-8	July 1, 1990
Aminoglycosides	Developmental	–	October 1, 1992
1-Amino-2-methylanthraquinone (Disperse Orange 11)	Cancer	82-28-0	October 1, 1989
2-Amino-5-(5-nitro-2-furyl)-1,3,4-thiadiazole	Cancer	712-68-5	July 1, 1987
4-Amino-2-nitrophenol	Cancer	119-34-6	January 29, 1999
Aminopterin	Developmental Reproductive toxicity (female)	54-62-6	July 1, 1987
Amiodarone hydrochloride	Developmental Reproductive toxicity (female, male)	19774-82-4	August 26, 1997
Amitraz	Developmental	33089-61-1	March 30, 1999
Amitrole	Cancer	61-82-5	July 1, 1987
Amoxapine	Developmental	14028-44-5	May 15, 1998
Amsacrine	Cancer	51264-14-3	August 7, 2009
Anabolic steroids	Reproductive toxicity (female, male)	–	April 1, 1990
Androstenedione	Cancer	63-05-8	May 3, 2011
ACE inhibitors (Angiotensin converting enzyme)	Developmental	–	October 1, 1992
Aniline	Cancer	62-53-3	January 1, 1990
Aniline hydrochloride	Cancer	142-04-1	May 15, 1998
o-Anisidine	Cancer	90-04-0	July 1, 1987
o-Anisidine hydrochloride	Cancer	134-29-2	July 1, 1987
Anisindione	Developmental	117-37-3	October 1, 1992
Anthracene	Cancer	120-12-7	August 11, 2023
Anthraquinone	Cancer	84-65-1	September 28, 2007
Antimony oxide (Antimony trioxide)	Cancer	1309-64-4	October 1, 1990
Aramite	Cancer	140-57-8	July 1, 1987
Areca nut	Cancer	–	February 3, 2006
Aristolochic acids	Cancer	–	July 9, 2004
Arsenic (inorganic arsenic compounds)	Cancer	–	February 27, 1987
Arsenic (inorganic oxides)	Developmental	–	May 1, 1997
Asbestos	Cancer	1332-21-4	February 27, 1987
Aspirin during the last three months of pregnancy	Developmental Reproductive toxicity (female)	50-78-2	July 1, 1990
Atenolol	Developmental	29122-68-7	August 26, 1997
Atrazine	Developmental Reproductive toxicity (female)	1912-24-9	July 15, 2016
Auramine	Cancer	492-80-8	July 1, 1987
Auranofin	Developmental	34031-32-8	January 29, 1999
Avermectin B1 (Abamectin)	Developmental	71751-41-2	December 3, 2010
Azacitidine	Cancer	320-67-2	January 1, 1992
Azaserine	Cancer	115-02-6	July 1, 1987
Azathioprine	Cancer Developmental	446-86-6	February 27, 1987 September 1, 1996
Azobenzene	Cancer	103-33-3	January 1, 1990
Barbiturates	Developmental	–	October 1, 1992
Beclomethasone dipropionate	Developmental	5534-09-8	May 15, 1998
Benomyl	Developmental Reproductive toxicity (male)	17804-35-2	July 1, 1991
Benthiavalicarb-isopropyl	Cancer	177406-68-7	July 1, 2008
Benz[a]anthracene	Cancer	56-55-3	July 1, 1987
Benzene	Cancer Developmental Reproductive toxicity (male)	71-43-2	February 27, 1987 December 26, 1997
Benzidine (and its salts)	Cancer	92-87-5	February 27, 1987
Benzidine-based dyes	Cancer	–	October 1, 1992
Benzodiazepines	Developmental	–	October 1, 1992
Benzo[b]fluoranthene	Cancer	205-99-2	July 1, 1987
Benzo[j]fluoranthene	Cancer	205-82-3	July 1, 1987
Benzo[k]fluoranthene	Cancer	207-08-9	July 1, 1987
Benzofuran	Cancer	271-89-6	October 1, 1990
Benzophenone	Cancer	119-61-9	
Benzo[a]pyrene	Cancer	50-32-8	
Benzotrichloride	Cancer	98-07-7	
Benzphetamine hydrochloride	Developmental	5411-22-3	
Benzyl chloride	Cancer	100-44-7	
Benzyl violet 4B	Cancer	1694-09-3	July 1, 1987
Beryllium and beryllium compounds	Cancer	–	
Betel quid with tobacco	Cancer	–	
Betel quid without tobacco	Cancer	–	
2,2-Bis(bromomethyl)-1,3-propanediol	Cancer	3296-90-0	
Bis(2-chloroethyl)ether	Cancer	111-44-4	
N,N-Bis(2-chloroethyl)-2-naphthylamine (Chlornapazine)	Cancer	494-03-1	
Bischloroethyl nitrosourea (BCNU, Carmustine)	Developmental	154-93-8	July 1, 1987
Bis(chloromethyl)ether	Cancer	542-88-1	
Bis(2-chloro-1-methylethyl)ether	Cancer	–	
Bisphenol A (BPA)	Reproductive toxicity (female) Developmental	80-05-7	May 11, 2015 December 18, 2020
Bisphenol S	Reproductive toxicity (female, male)	80-09-1	December 29, 2023 January 3, 2025
Bitumen, extracts of steam-refined and air refined	Cancer	–	
Bracken fern	Cancer	–	
Bromacil lithium salt	Developmental, Reproductive toxicity (male)	53404-19-6	May 18, 1999 January 17, 2003
Bromate	Cancer	15541-45-4	
Bromochloroacetic acid	Cancer	5589-96-8	
Bromodichloroacetic acid	Cancer	71133-14-7	
Bromodichloromethane	Cancer	75-27-4	
Bromoethane	Cancer	74-96-4	December 22, 2000
Bromoform	Cancer	75-25-2	
1-Bromopropane (1-BP)	Cancer Developmental Reproductive toxicity (female, male)	106-94-5	August 5, 2016 December 7, 2004
2-Bromopropane (2-BP)	Cancer Reproductive toxicity (female, male)	75-26-3	August 11, 2023 May 31, 2005
1-Bromo-3-chloropropane	Cancer	109-70-6	
Bromoxynil	Developmental	1689-84-5	October 1, 1990
Bromoxynil octanoate	Developmental	1689-99-2	
Butabarbital sodium	Developmental	143-81-7	
1,3-Butadiene	Cancer Developmental Reproductive toxicity (female, male)	106-99-0	April 1, 1988 April 16, 2004
1,4-Butanediol dimethanesulfonate (Busulfan)	Cancer Developmental	55-98-1	February 27, 1987 January 1, 1989
1-Butyl glycidyl ether	Cancer	2426-08-6	
Butylated hydroxyanisole	Cancer	25013-16-5	
Butyl benzyl phthalate (BBP)	Developmental	85-68-7	
beta-Butyrolactone	Cancer	3068-88-0	July 1, 1987
Cacodylic acid	Cancer	75-60-5	
Cadmium and cadmium compounds	Developmental Reproductive toxicity (male) Cancer	–	May 1, 1997 October 1, 1987
Caffeic acid	Cancer	331-39-5	
Captafol	Cancer	2425-06-1	
Captan	Cancer	133-06-2	
Carbamazepine	Developmental	298-46-4	
Carbaryl	Cancer Developmental Reproductive toxicity (female, male)	63-25-2	February 5, 2010 August 7, 2009
Carbazole	Cancer	86-74-8	
Carbon black (airborne, unbound particles of respirable size)		1333-86-4	
Carbon-black extracts	Cancer	---	January 1, 1990
Carbon disulfide		75-15-0	
Carbon monoxide		630-08-0	
Carbon tetrachloride		56-23-5	
Carboplatin		41575-94-4	
N-Carboxymethyl-N-nitrosourea		60391-92-6	
Catechol		120-80-9	
Chenodiol		474-25-9	
Chloral		75-87-6	
Chloral hydrate		302-17-0	
Chlorambucil		305-03-3	
Chloramphenicol sodium succinate		982-57-0	
Chlorcyclizine hydrochloride	Developmental	1620-21-9	July 1, 1987
Chlordane		57-74-9	
Chlordecone (Kepone)		143-50-0	
Chlordiazepoxide		58-25-3	
Chlordiazepoxide hydrochloride		438-41-5	
Chlordimeform		6164-98-3	
Chlorendic acid		115-28-6	
Chlorinated paraffins (Avg. chain length C12; approx. 60 percent chlorine by weight)		108171-26-2	
p-Chloroaniline		106-47-8	
p-Chloroaniline hydrochloride		20265-96-7	
Chloroethane		75-00-3	
1-(2-Chloroethyl)-3-cyclohexyl-1-nitrosourea (CCNU, Lomustine)		13010-47-4	
1-(2-Chloroethyl)-3-(4-methylcyclohexyl)-1-nitrosourea (Methyl-CCNU)		13909-09-6	
Chloroform		67-66-3	
Chloromethyl methyl ether		107-30-2	
3-Chloro-2-methylpropene		563-47-3	
1-Chloro-4-nitrobenzene		100-00-5	
4-Chloro-o-phenylenediamine		95-83-0	
Chloroprene		126-99-8	
2-Chloropropionic acid		598-78-7	
Chlorothalonil		1897-45-6	
p-Chloro-o-toluidine		95-69-2	
Strong acid salts of p-Chloro-o-toluidine		–	
5-Chloro-o-toluidine and its strong acid salts		95-79-4	
Chlorotrianisene		569-57-3	
Chlorozotocin		54749-90-5	
Chlorpyrifos		2921-88-2	
Chrysene		218-01-9	
C.I. Acid Red 114		6459-94-5	
C.I. Basic Red 9 monohydrochloride		569-61-9	
C.I. Direct Blue 15		2429-74-5	
C.I. Direct Blue 218		28407-37-6	
C.I. Disperse Yellow 3		2832-40-8	
C.I. Solvent Yellow 14		842-07-9	
Ciclosporin (Cyclosporine, Cyclosporine A)		59865-13-3; 79217-60-0	
Cidofovir		113852-37-2	
Cinnamyl anthranilate		87-29-6	
Cisplatin		15663-27-1	
Citrus Red No. 2		6358-53-8	
Cladribine		4291-63-8	
Clarithromycin	Developmental	81103-11-9	May 1, 1997
Clobetasol propionate		25122-46-7	
Clofibrate		637-07-0	
Clomiphene citrate		50-41-9	
Clorazepate dipotassium		57109-90-7	
CMNP (pyrazachlor)		6814-58-0	
Coal-tar pitch		–	
Cobalt metal powder		7440-48-4	
Cobalt(II) oxide		1307-96-6	
Cobalt sulfate		10124-43-3	
Cobalt sulfate heptahydrate		10026-24-1	
Cocaine		50-36-2	
Cocamide diethanolamine (Coconut oil diethanolamine condensate)		–	
Codeine phosphate		52-28-8	
Coke oven emissions		–	
Colchicine		64-86-8	
Conjugated estrogens		–	
Creosotes		–	
p-Cresidine		120-71-8	
Cumene		98-82-8	
Cupferron		135-20-6	
Cyanazine		21725-46-2	
Cycasin		14901-08-7	
Cycloate		1134-23-2	
Cycloheximide		66-81-9	
Cyclopenta[cd]pyrene		27208-37-3	
Cyclophosphamide		50-18-0; 6055-19-2	
Cyhexatin		13121-70-5	
Cytarabine		147-94-4	
Cytembena		21739-91-3	
D&C Orange No. 17	Cancer	3468-63-1	
D&C Red No. 8	Cancer	2092-56-0	October 1, 1990
D&C Red No. 9	Cancer	5160-02-1	
D&C Red No. 19	Cancer	81-88-9	
Dacarbazine		4342-03-4	
Daminozide		1596-84-5	
Danazol		17230-88-5	
Dantron (Chrysazin; 1,8-Dihydroxyanthraquinone)		117-10-2	
Daunomycin		20830-81-3	
Daunorubicin hydrochloride		23541-50-6	
2,4-D butyric acid		94-82-6	
DDD (Dichlorodiphenyl-dichloroethane)		72-54-8	
DDE (Dichlorodiphenyl-dichloroethylene)		72-55-9	
DDT (Dichlorodiphenyl-trichloroethane)		50-29-3	
o,p'-DDT		789-02-6	
p,p'-DDT		50-29-3	
DDVP (Dichlorvos)		62-73-7	
Demeclocycline hydrochloride		64-73-3	
Des-ethyl atrazine (DEA)		6190-65-4	
Des-isopropyl atrazine (DIA)		1007-28-9	
N,N'-Diacetylbenzidine		613-35-4	
2,4-Diaminoanisole	Cancer	615-05-4	October 1, 1990
2,4-Diaminoanisole sulfate		39156-41-7	
2,4-Diamino-6-chloro-s-triazine (DACT)		3397-62-4	
4,4'-Diaminodiphenyl ether (4,4'-Oxydianiline)		101-80-4	
2,4-Diaminotoluene		95-80-7	
Diazepam		439-14-5	
Diazoaminobenzene		136-35-6	
Diazoxide		364-98-7	
Dibenz[a,h]acridine		226-36-8	
Dibenz[a,j]acridine		224-42-0	
Dibenzanthracenes		–	
Dibenz[a,c]anthracene		215-58-7	
Dibenz[a,h]anthracene		53-70-3	
Dibenz[a,j]anthracene		224-41-9	
7H-Dibenzo[c,g]carbazole		194-59-2	
Dibenzo[a,e]pyrene		192-65-4	
Dibenzo[a,h]pyrene		189-64-0	
Dibenzo[a,i]pyrene		189-55-9	
Dibenzo[a,l]pyrene		191-30-0	
Dibromoacetic acid		631-64-1	
Dibromoacetonitrile		3252-43-5	
1,2-Dibromo-3-chloropropane (DBCP)	Cancer	96-12-8	July 1, 1987
2,3-Dibromo-1-propanol		96-13-9	
Dichloroacetic acid		79-43-6	
p-Dichlorobenzene		106-46-7	
3,3'-Dichlorobenzidine		91-94-1	
3,3'-Dichlorobenzidine dihydrochloride		612-83-9	
1,4-Dichloro-2-butene		764-41-0	
3,3'-Dichloro-4,4'-diamino-diphenyl ether		28434-86-8	
1,1-Dichloroethane		75-34-3	
Dichloromethane (Methylene chloride)		75-09-2	
Dichlorophene		97-23-4	
Dichlorphenamide		120-97-8	
1,2-Dichloropropane		78-87-5	
1,3-Dichloro-2-propanol (1,3-DCP)		96-23-1	
1,3-Dichloropropene		542-75-6	
Diclofop methyl		51338-27-3	
Dicumarol		66-76-2	
Dieldrin		60-57-1	
Diepoxybutane		1464-53-5	
Diesel engine exhaust	Cancer	–	October 1, 1990
Diethanolamine		111-42-2	
Di(2-ethylhexyl)phthalate (DEHP)		117-81-7	
1,2-Diethylhydrazine		1615-80-1	
Diethylstilbestrol (DES)	Cancer Developmental	56-53-1	February 27. 1987 July 1, 1987
Diethyl sulfate		64-67-5	
Diflunisal		22494-42-4	
Diglycidyl resorcinol ether (DGRE)		101-90-6	
Dihydroergotamine mesylate	Develeopmental	6190-39-2	May 1, 1997
Dihydrosafrole		94-58-6	
Di-isodecyl phthalate (DIDP)		68515-49-1/26761-40-0	
Diisononyl phthalate (DINP)		–	
Diisopropyl sulfate		2973-10-6	
Diltiazem hydrochloride		33286-22-5	
3,3'-Dimethoxybenzidine (o-Dianisidine)		119-90-4	
3,3'-Dimethoxybenzidine dihydrochloride	Cancer	20325-40-0	October 1, 1990
N,N-Dimethylacetamide		127-19-5	
4-Dimethylaminoazobenzene		60-11-7	
trans-2-[(Dimethylamino)methylimino]-5-[2-(5-nitro-2-furyl)vinyl]-1,3,4-oxadiazole		55738-54-0	
7,12-Dimethylbenz[a]anthracene		57-97-6	
3,3'-Dimethylbenzidine (ortho-Tolidine)		119-93-7	
3,3'-Dimethylbenzidine dihydrochloride		612-82-8	
Dimethylcarbamoyl chloride		79-44-7	
1,1-Dimethylhydrazine (UDMH)		57-14-7	
1,2-Dimethylhydrazine		540-73-8	
Dimethyl hydrogen phosphite		868-85-9	
2,6-Dimethyl-N-nitrosomorpholine (DMNM)		1456-28-6	
Dimethyl sulfate		77-78-1	
N,N-Dimethyl-p-toluidine		99-97-8	
Dimethylvinylchloride		513-37-1	
Di-n-butyl phthalate (DBP)		84-74-2	
Di-n-hexyl phthalate (DnHP)		84-75-3	
m-Dinitrobenzene		99-65-0	
o-Dinitrobenzene		528-29-0	
p-Dinitrobenzene		100-25-4	
3,7-Dinitrofluoranthene		105735-71-5	
3,9-Dinitrofluoranthene		22506-53-2	
1,3-Dinitropyrene		75321-20-9	
1,6-Dinitropyrene	Cancer	42397-64-8	October 1, 1990
1,8-Dinitropyrene		42397-65-9	
2,4-Dinitrotoluene		121-14-2	
2,6-Dinitrotoluene		606-20-2	
Dinitrotoluene		–	
Dinocap		39300-45-3	
Dinoseb		88-85-7	
Di-n-propyl isocinchomeronate (MGK Repellent 326)		136-45-8	
1,4-Dioxane		123-91-1	
Diphenylhydantoin (Phenytoin)	Cancer Developmental	57-41-0	January 1, 1988 July 1, 1987
Diphenylhydantoin sodium salt	Cancer	630-93-3	
Direct Black 38		1937-37-7	
Direct Blue 6		2602-46-2	
Direct Brown 95		16071-86-6	
Disodium cyanodithioimidocarbonate		138-93-2	
Disperse Blue 1	Cancer	2475-45-8	October 1, 1990
Diuron		330-54-1	
Doxorubicin hydrochloride (Adriamycin)	Cancer Developmental Reproductive toxicity (male)	25316-40-9	July 1, 1987 January 29, 1999
Doxycycline		564-25-0	
Doxycycline calcium		94088-85-4	
Doxycycline hyclate		24390-14-5	
Doxycycline monohydrate		17086-28-1	
Emissions from Combustion of coal		–	
Emissions from high-temperature unrefined rapeseed oil		–	
Endrin		72-20-8	
Environmental tobacco smoke (ETS)		–	
Epichlorohydrin		106-89-8	
Epoxiconazole		135319-73-2	
Ergotamine tartrate		379-79-3	
Erionite		12510-42-8; 66733-21-9	
Estradiol		50-28-2	
Estragole		140-67-0	
Estrogens (steroidal)		–	
Estrone		53-16-7	
Estropipate		7280-37-7	
Ethanol in alcoholic beverages		–	
Ethinylestradiol		57-63-6	
Ethionamide		536-33-4	
Ethoprop		13194-48-4	
Ethyl acrylate		140-88-5	
Ethylbenzene		100-41-4	
Ethyl dipropylthiocarbamate		759-94-4	
Ethyl-4,4'-dichlorobenzilate		510-15-6	
Ethylene dibromide	Cancer Developmental Reproductive toxicity (male)	106-93-4	July 1, 1987 May 15, 1998
Ethylene dichloride (1,2-Dichloroethane)		107-06-2	
Ethylene glycol (when ingested)		107-21-1	
Ethylene glycol monoethyl ether		110-80-5	
Ethylene glycol monoethyl ether acetate		111-15-9	
Ethylene glycol monomethyl ether		109-86-4	
Ethylene glycol monomethyl ether acetate		110-49-6	
Ethyleneimine (Aziridine)		151-56-4	
Ethylene oxide	Cancer Reproductive toxicity (female)	75-21-8	July 1, 1987 February 27, 1987
Ethylene thiourea		96-45-7	
Ethyl methanesulfonate		62-50-0	
Etodolac		41340-25-4	
Etoposide		33419-42-0	
Etoposide in combination with Cisplatin and Bleomycin		–	
Etretinate	Developmental	54350-48-0	July 1, 1987
Fenoxaprop ethyl		66441-23-4	
Fenoxycarb		72490-01-8	
Filgrastim		121181-53-1	
Fluazifop butyl		69806-50-4	
Flunisolide		3385-03-3	
Fluoro-edenite fibrous amphibole		–	
Fluorouracil		51-21-8	
Fluoxymesterone		76-43-7	
Flurazepam hydrochloride		1172-18-5	
Flurbiprofen		5104-49-4	
Flutamide		13311-84-7	
Fluticasone propionate		80474-14-2	
Fluvalinate		69409-94-5	
Folpet		133-07-3	
Formaldehyde (gas)		50-00-0	
2-(2-Formylhydrazino)-4-(5-nitro-2-furyl)thiazole		3570-75-0	
Fumonisin B1		116355-83-0	
Furan		110-00-9	
Furazolidone		67-45-8	
Furfuryl alcohol		98-00-0	
Furmecyclox		60568-05-0	
Fusarin C		79748-81-5	
Gallium arsenide		1303-00-0	
Ganciclovir		82410-32-0	
Ganciclovir sodium		107910-75-8	
Gasoline engine exhaust (condensates/extracts)	Cancer	–	October 1, 1990
Gemfibrozil	Cancer Reproductive toxicity (female, male)	25812-30-0	December 22, 2000 August 20, 1999
Gentian violet(Crystal violet)		548-62-9	
Glass wool fibers (when inhalable and biopersistent)		–	
Glu-P-1 (2-Amino-6-methyldipyrido[1,2- a:3',2'-d]imidazole)		67730-11-4	
Glu-P-2 (2-Aminodipyrido[1,2-a:3',2'-d]imidazole)		67730-10-3	
Glycidaldehyde		765-34-4	
Glycidol		556-52-5	
Glycidyl methacrylate		106-91-2	
Glyphosate		1071-83-6	
Goldenseal root powder		–	
Goserelin acetate		65807-02-5	
Griseofulvin		126-07-8	
Gyromitrin (Acetaldehyde methylformylhydrazone)		16568-02-8	
Halazepam		23092-17-3	
Halobetasol propionate		66852-54-8	
Haloperidol		52-86-8	
Halothane		151-67-7	
HC Blue 1		2784-94-3	
Heptachlor		76-44-8	
Heptachlor epoxide		1024-57-3	
Herbal remedies containing plant species of the genus Aristolochia		–	
Hexachlorobenzene		118-74-1	
Hexachlorobutadiene		87-68-3	
Hexachlorocyclohexane		–	
Hexachlorodibenzodioxin		34465-46- 8	
Hexachloroethane		67-72-1	
2,4-Hexadienal		–	
Hexafluoroacetone		684-16-2	
Hexamethylphosphoramide		680-31-9	
n-Hexane		110-54-3	
2,5-Hexanedione		110-13-4	
Hexavalent chromium		–	
Histrelin acetate		–	
Hydramethylnon		67485-29-4	
Hydrazine		302-01-2	
Hydrazine sulfate		10034-93-2	
Hydrazobenzene (1,2-Diphenylhydrazine)		122-66-7	
Hydrogen cyanide		74-90-8	
1-Hydroxyanthraquinone	Cancer	129-43-1	
Hydroxyurea	Developmental	127-07-1	May 1, 1997
Idarubicin hydrochloride		57852-57-0	
Ifosfamide		3778-73-2	
Iodine-131		10043-66-0	
Imazalil		35554-44-0	
Indeno[1,2,3-cd]pyrene		193-39-5	
Indium phosphide		22398-80-7	
Indium tin oxide		50926-11-9	
IQ (2-Amino-3-methylimidazo[4,5-f] quinoline)		76180-96-6	
Iprodione		36734-19-7	
Iprovalicarb		140923-17-7; 140923-25-7	
Iron dextran complex		9004-66-4	
Isobutyl nitrite		542-56-3	
Isoprene		78-79-5	
Isopyrazam		881685-58-1	
Isotretinoin	Developmental	4759-48-2	July 1, 1987
Isoxaflutole	Cancer	141112-29-0	December 22, 2000
Kresoxim-methyl		143390-89-0	
Lactofen		77501-63-4	
Lasiocarpine		303-34-4	
Lead		7439-92-1	
Lead and lead compounds	Cancer	–	
Lead acetate	Cancer	301-04-2	
Lead phosphate	Cancer	7446-27-7	
Lead subacetate	Cancer	1335-32-6	
Leather dust	Cancer	–	
Leuprolide acetate		74381-53-6	
Levodopa		59-92-7	
Levonorgestrel implants		797-63-7	
Leucomalachite green	Cancer	129-73-7	
Lindane and other hexachlorocyclohexane isomers	Cancer	–	
Linuron	Developmental	330-55-2	
Lithium carbonate	Developmental	554-13-2	January 1, 1991
Lithium citrate	Developmental	919-16-4	January 1, 1991
Lorazepam	Developmental	846-49-1	
Lovastatin	Developmental	75330-75-5	
Lynestrenol	Cancer	52-76-6	
Malathion	Cancer	121-75-5	
Malonaldehyde, sodium salt	Cancer	24382-04-5	
Mancozeb	Cancer	8018-01-7	
Maneb		12427-38-2	
Me-A-alpha-C (2-Amino-3-methyl-9H-pyrido[2,3-b]indole)		68006-83-7	
Mebendazole		31431-39-7	
Medroxyprogesterone acetate		71-58-9	
Megestrol acetate	Cancer Developmental	595-33-5	March 28, 2014 January 1, 1991
MeIQ (2-Amino-3,4-dimethylimidazo[4,5-f]quinoline)		77094-11-2	
MeIQx (2-Amino-3,8-dimethylimidazo[4,5-f]quinoxaline)		77500-04-0	
Melphalan		148-82-3	
Menotropins		9002-68-0	
Mepanipyrim		110235-47-7	
Meprobamate		57-53-4	
2-Mercaptobenzothiazole		149-30-4	
Mercaptopurine		6112-76-1	
Mercury and compounds		–	
Merphalan		531-76-0	
Mestranol		72-33-3	
Metam potassium		137-41-7	
Methacycline hydrochloride	Developmental	3963-95-9	January 1, 1991
Metham sodium		137-42-8	
Methanol		67-56-1	
Methazole		20354-26-1	
Methimazole		60-56-0	
Methotrexate		59-05-2	
Methotrexate sodium		15475-56-6	
5-Methoxypsoralen with ultraviolet A therapy		484-20-8	
8-Methoxypsoralen with ultraviolet A therapy		298-81-7	
2-Methylaziridine (Propyleneimine)		75-55-8	
Methylazoxymethanol		590-96-5	
Methylazoxymethanol acetate		592-62-1	
Methyl bromide as fumigant		74-83-9	
Methyl carbamate		598-55-0	
Methyl chloride		74-87-3	
3-Methylcholanthrene		56-49-5	
5-Methylchrysene		3697-24-3	
4,4'-Methylene bis(2-chloroaniline)	Cancer	101-14-4	July 1, 1987
4,4'-Methylene bis(N,N-dimethyl)benzenamine		101-61-1	
4,4'-Methylene bis(2-methylaniline)		838-88-0	
4,4'-Methylenedianiline		101-77-9	
4,4'-Methylenedianiline dihydrochloride		13552-44-8	
Methyleugenol		93-15-2	
2-Methylimidazole		693-98-1	
4-Methylimidazole		822-36-6	
Methyl iodide		74-88-4	
Methyl isobutyl ketone (MIBK)		108-10-1	
Methyl isocyanate (MIC)		624-83-9	
Methyl mercury and compounds	Developmental Cancer	–	July 1, 1987 May 1, 1996
Methyl methanesulfonate		66-27-3	
Methyl-n-butyl ketone		591-78-6	
2-Methyl-1-nitroanthraquinone		129-15-7	
N-Methyl-N'-nitro-N-nitrosoguanidine		70-25-7	
N-Methylolacrylamide		924-42-5	
N-Methylpyrrolidone		872-50-4	
α-Methyl styrene (alpha-Methylstyrene)		98-83-9	
Methyltestosterone		58-18-4	
Methylthiouracil		56-04-2	
Metiram		9006-42-2	
Metronidazole		443-48-1	
Michler's ketone		90-94-8	
Midazolam hydrochloride		59467-96-8	
Minocycline hydrochloride		13614-98-7	
Mirex		2385-85-5	
Misoprostol		59122-46-2	
Mitomycin C		50-07-7	
Mitoxantrone hydrochloride		70476-82-3	
Molybdenum trioxide		1313-27-5	
Molinate		2212-67-1	
MON 4660 (dichloroacetyl-1-oxa-4-azaspiro(4,5)-decane)		71526-07-3	
MON 13900 (furilazole)		121776-33-8	
3-Monochloropropane-1,2-diol (3-MCDP)		96-24-2	
Monocrotaline		315-22-0	
MOPP (vincristine-prednisone-nitrogen mustard-procarbazine mixture)		113803-47-7	
5-(Morpholinomethyl)-3-[(5-nitrofurfurylidene)-amino]-2-oxazolidinone		139-91-3	
Mustard Gas		505-60-2	
MX (3-chloro-4-dichloromethyl-5-hydroxy-2(5H)-furanone)	Cancer	77439-76-0	December 22, 2000
Myclobutanil		88671-89-0	
Beta-Myrcene		123-35-3	
Nabam		142-59-6	
Nafarelin acetate		86220-42-0	
Nafenopin		3771-19-5	
Nalidixic acid		389-08-2	
Naphthalene		91-20-3	
1-Naphthylamine		134-32-7	
2-Naphthylamine		91-59-8	
Neomycin sulfate		1405-10-3	
Netilmicin sulfate		56391-57-2	
Nickel (Metallic)		7440-02-0	
Nickel acetate		373-02-4	
Nickel carbonate		3333-67-3	
Nickel carbonyl		13463-39-3	
Nickel (soluble compounds)		–	
Nickel hydroxide		12054-48-7; 12125-56-3	
Nickelocene		1271-28-9	
Nickel oxide		1313-99-1	
Nickel refinery dust from the pyrometallurgical process		–	
Nickel subsulfide		12035-72-2	
Nicotine		54-11-5	
Nifedipine		21829-25-4	
Nimodipine		66085-59-4	
Niridazole		61-57-4	
Nitrapyrin		1929-82-4	
Nitrilotriacetic acid		139-13-9	
Nitrilotriacetic acid, trisodium salt monohydrate		18662-53-8	
5-Nitroacenaphthene		602-87-9	
o-Nitroanisole		91-23-6	
Nitrobenzene		98-95-3	
4-Nitrobiphenyl		92-93-3	
6-Nitrochrysene	Cancer	7496-02-8	October 1, 1990
Nitrofen (technical grade)		1836-75-5	
2-Nitrofluorene	Cancer	607-57-8	October 1, 1990
Nitrofurantoin		67-20-9	
Nitrofurazone		59-87-0	
1-[(5-Nitrofurfurylidene)-amino]-2-imidazolidinone		555-84-0	
N-[4-(5-Nitro-2-furyl)-2-thiazolyl]acetamide		531-82-8	
Nitrogen mustard (Mechlorethamine)		51-75-2	
Nitrogen mustard hydrochloride (Mechlorethamine hydrochloride)		55-86-7	
Nitrogen mustard N-oxide	Cancer	126-85-2	
Nitrogen mustard N-oxide hydrochloride	Cancer	302-70-5	
Nitromethane	Cancer	75-52-5	May 1, 1997
2-Nitropropane	Cancer	79-46-9	
1-Nitropyrene	Cancer	5522-43-0	October 1, 1990
4-Nitropyrene	Cancer	57835-92-4	October 1, 1990
N,N-Dimethylformamide	Cancer	68-12-2	
N-Nitrosodi-n-butylamine	Cancer	924-16-3	
N-Nitrosodiethanolamine	Cancer	1116-54-7	
N-Nitrosodiethylamine	Cancer	55-18-5	
N-Nitrosodimethylamine	Cancer	62-75-9	
p-Nitrosodiphenylamine	Cancer	156-10-5	
N-Nitrosodiphenylamine	Cancer	86-30-6	
N-Nitrosodi-n-propylamine		621-64-7	
N-Nitroso-N-ethylurea		759-73-9	
N-Nitrosohexamethyleneimine		932-83-2	
3-(N-Nitrosmethylamino) propionitrile		60153-49-3	
4-(N-Nitrosomethylamino)-1-(3-pyridyl)-1-butanone		64091-91-4	
N-Nitrosomethyl-n-butylamine		7068-83-9	
N-Nitrosomethyl-n-decylamine		75881-22-0	
N-Nitrosomethyl-n-dodecylamine		55090-44-3	
N-Nitrosomethylethylamine		10595-95-6	
N-Nitrosomethyl-n-heptylamine		16338-99-1	
N-Nitrosomethyl-n-hexylamine		28538-70-7	
N-Nitrosomethyl-n-nonylamine		75881-19-5	
N-Nitrosomethyl-n-octylamine		34423-54-6	
N-Nitrosomethyl-n-pentylamine		13256-07-0	
N-Nitrosomethyl-n-propylamine		924-46-9	
N-Nitrosomethyl-n-tetradecylamine		75881-20-8	
N-Nitrosomethyl-n-undecylamine		68107-26-6	
N-Nitroso-N-methylurea		684-93-5	
N-Nitroso-N-methylurethane		615-53-2	
N-Nitrosomethylvinylamine		4549-40-0	
N-Nitrosomorpholine		59-89-2	
N-Nitrosonornicotine		16543-55-8	
N-Nitrosopiperidine		100-75-4	
N-Nitrosopyrrolidine		930-55-2	
N-Nitrososarcosine		13256-22-9	
o-Nitrotoluene		88-72-2	
Nitrous oxide		10024-97-2	
Norethisterone (Norethindrone)		68-22-4	
Norethisterone acetate (Norethindrone acetate)		51-98-9	
Norethynodrel		68-23-5	
Norgestrel		6533-00-2	
Ochratoxin A		303-47-9	
Oil Orange SS		2646-17-5	
Oral contraceptives, combined or sequential		–	
Oryzalin		19044-88-3	
Oxadiazon		19666-30-9	
Oxazepam		604-75-1	
Oxydemeton methyl		301-12-2	
Oxymetholone	Cancer Developmental	434-07-1	January 1, 1988 May 1, 1997
Oxytetracycline (internal use)	Developmental	79-57-2	January 1, 1991
Oxytetracycline hydrochloride		2058-46-0	
Oxythioquinox (Chinomethionat)		2439-01-2	
Paclitaxel		33069-62-4	
Palygorskite fibers (> 5 μm in length)		12174-11-7	
Panfuran S		794-93-4	
Paramethadione		115-67-3	
Parathion		56-38-2	
Penicillamine	Developmental	52-67-5	January 1, 1991
Pentabromodiphenyl ether mixture [DE-71 (technical grade)]		–	
Pentachlorophenol		87-86-5	
Pentachlorophenol and by-products of its synthesis (complex mixture)		–	
Pentobarbital sodium		57-33-0	
Pentosan polysulfate sodium		–	
Pentostatin		53910-25-1	
Perfluorooctane sulfonate (PFOS)		1763-23-1	
Perfluorooctanoic acid (PFOA)		335-67-1	
Pertuzumab	Developmental	380610-27-5	January 27, 2017
Phenacemide		63-98-9	
Phenacetin (in analgesic mixtures)	Cancer	62-44-2	
Phenazopyridine		94-78-0	
Phenazopyridine hydrochloride		136-40-3	
Phenesterin		3546-10-9	
Phenobarbital		50-06-6	
Phenolphthalein		77-09-8	
Phenoxybenzamine		59-96-1	
Phenoxybenzamine hydrochloride		63-92-3	
Phenprocoumon		435-97-2	
o-Phenylenediamine and its salts		95-54-5	
Phenyl glycidyl ether	Cancer	122-60-1	October 1, 1990
Phenylhydrazine and its salts		–	
o-Phenylphenate, sodium		132-27-4	
o-Phenylphenol		90-43-7	
Phenylphosphine		638-21-1	
PhiP (2-Amino-1-methyl-6-phenylimidazol[4,5-b]pyridine)		105650-23-5	
Pimozide		2062-78-4	
Pioglitazone		111025-46-8	
Pipobroman		54-91-1	
Pirimicarb		23103-98-2	
Plicamycin		18378-89-7	
Polybrominated biphenyls		–	
Polychlorinated biphenyls	Cancer Developmental	–	October 1, 1989 January 1, 1991
Polychlorinated biphenyls (containing 60 or more percent chlorine by molecular weight)		–	
Polychlorinated dibenzo-p-dioxins		–	
Polychlorinated dibenzofurans		–	
Polygeenan		53973-98-1	
Ponceau MX		3761-53-3	
Ponceau 3R		3564-09-8	
Potassium bromate		7758-01-2	
Potassium dimethyldithiocarbamate		128-03-0	
Pravastatin sodium		81131-70-6	
Prednisolone sodium phosphate		125-02-0	
Primidone		125-33-7	
Procarbazine		671-16-9	
Procarbazine hydrochloride		366-70-1	
Procymidone		32809-16-8	
Progesterone		57-83-0	
Pronamide		23950-58-5	
Propachlor		1918-16-7	
1,3-Propane sultone		1120-71-4	
Propargite		2312-35-8	
Propazine		139-40-2	
beta-Propiolactone		57-57-8	
Propoxur		114-26-1	
Propylene glycol mono-t-butyl ether		57018-52-7	
Propylene oxide		75-56-9	
Propylthiouracil		51-52-5	
Pulegone		89-82-7	
Pymetrozine		123312-89-0	
Pyridine		110-86-1	
Pyrimethamine		58-14-0	
Quazepam		36735-22-5	
Quinoline and its strong acid salts		–	
Quizalofop-ethyl		76578-14-8	
Radionuclides		–	
Reserpine		50-55-5	
Residual (heavy) fuel oils	Cancer	–	October 1, 1990
Resmethrin		10453-86-8	
Retinol/retinyl esters (Note: When in daily dosages in excess of 10,000 IU, or 3,000 retinol equivalents. (NOTE: Retinol/retinyl esters arerequired and essential for maintenance of normal reproductive function. The recommended daily level during pregnancy is 8,000 IU.))		–	
Ribavirin		36791-04-5	
Riddelliine		23246-96-0	
Rifampin		13292-46-1	
Safrole		94-59-7	
Salted fish, Chinese-style		–	
Secobarbital sodium		309-43-3	
Sedaxane		874967-67-6	
Selenium sulfide		7446-34-6	
Sermorelin acetate		–	
Shale oils		68308-34-9	
Silica, crystalline (airborne particles of respirable size)		–	
Silicon carbide whiskers		–	
Simazine		122-34-9	
Sodium dimethyldithiocarbamate		128-04-1	
Sodium fluoroacetate		62-74-8	
Soots, tars, and mineral oils (untreated and mildly treated oils and used engine oils)		–	
Spirodiclofen		148477-71-8	
Spironolactone	Cancer	52-01-7	May 1, 1997
Stanozolol	Cancer	10418-03-8	May 1, 1997
Sterigmatocystin	Cancer	10048-13-2	
Streptomycin sulfate	Developmental	3810-74-0	January 1, 1991
Streptozocin (streptozotocin)	Developmental Reproductive toxicity (female, male)	18883-66-4	
Strong inorganic acid mists containing sulfuric acid	Cancer	–	
Styrene	Cancer	100-42-5	
Styrene oxide		96-09-3	
Sulfallate		95-06-7	
Sulfasalazine (Salicylazosulfapyridine)		599-79-1	
Sulfur dioxide		7446-09-5	
Sulindac		38194-50-2	
Talc containing asbestiform fibers		–	
Tamoxifen		10540-29-1	
Tamoxifen citrate		54965-24-1	
Temazepam		846-50-4	
Teniposide		29767-20-2	
Terbacil		5902-51-2	
Teriparatide		52232-67-4	
Terrazole		2593-15-9	
Testosterone		58-22-0	
Testosterone cypionate		58-20-8	
Testosterone enanthate		315-37-7	
Tetrabromobisphenol A		79-94-7	
3,3',4,4'-Tetrachloroazobenzene		14047-09-7	
2,3,7,8-Tetrachlorodibenzo-p-dioxin (TCDD)		1746-01-6	
1,1,1,2-Tetrachloroethane		630-20-6	
1,1,2,2-Tetrachloroethane		79-34-5	
Tetrachloroethylene (Perchloroethylene)		127-18-4	
p-α,α,α-Tetrachlorotoluene		5216-25-1	
Tetrachlorvinphos		22248-79-9	
Tetracycline (internal use)	Developmental	60-54-8	
Tetracyclines (internal use)	Developmental	–	
Tetracycline hydrochloride (internal use)	Developmental	64-75-5	January 1, 1991
Tetrafluoroethylene	Cancer	116-14-3	May 1, 1997
Tetranitromethane		509-14-8	July 1, 1990
Thalidomide	Developmental	50-35-1	July 1, 1987
Thioacetamide		62-55-5	
Titanium dioxide		13463-67-7	
4,4'-Thiodianiline		139-65-1	
Thiodicarb		59669-26-0	
Thioguanine		154-42-7	
Thiophanate methyl		23564-05-8	
2-Thiouracil		141-90-2	
Thiourea		62-56-6	
Thorium dioxide		1314-20-1	
Tobacco, oral use of smokeless products		–	
Tobacco smoke		–	
Tobacco smoke (Primary)		–	
Tobramycin sulfate		49842-07-1	
Toluene	Developmental	108-88-3	January 1, 1991
Toluene diisocyanate		26471-62-5	
o-Toluidine		95-53-4	
o-Toluidine hydrochloride		636-21-5	
Topiramate		97240-79-4	
Toxaphene (Polychlorinated camphenes)		8001-35-2	
Fusarium toxins		–	
Treosulfan		299-75-2	
Triadimefon		43121-43-3	
Triamterene		396-01-0	
Triazolam		28911-01-5	
S,S,S-Tributyl phosphorotrithioate (Tribufos, DEF)		78-48-8	
Tributyltin methacrylate		2155-70-6	
Trichlormethine (Trimustine hydrochloride)		817-09-4	
Trichloroacetic acid		76-03-9	
1,1,1-Trichloroethane		71-55-6	
Trichloroethylene		79-01-6	
2,4,6-Trichlorophenol		88-06-2	
1,2,3-Trichloropropane		96-18-4	
Trientine hydrochloride		38260-01-4	
Triforine		26644-46-2	
Trilostane	Developmental	13647-35-3	
Trimethadione	Developmental	127-48-0	January 1, 1991
2,4,5-Trimethylaniline		–	
Trimethyl phosphate		512-56-1	
Trimetrexate glucuronate		82952-64-5	
TRIM VX		–	
2,4,6-Trinitrotoluene (TNT)		118-96-7	
Triphenyltin hydroxide		76-87-9	
Tris(1-aziridinyl)phosphine sulfide (Thiotepa)		52-24-4	
Tris(2-chloroethyl) phosphate		115-96-8	
Tris(2,3-dibromopropyl)phosphate		126-72-7	
Tris(1,3-dichloro-2-propyl) phosphate (TDCPP)		13674-87-8	
Trp-P-1 (Tryptophan-P-1)		62450-06-0	
Trp-P-2 (Tryptophan-P-2)		62450-07-1	
Trypan blue		72-57-1	
Unleaded gasoline		–	
Uracil mustard		66-75-1	
Urethane (Ethyl carbamate)		51-79-6	
Urofollitropin		97048-13-0	
Valproate (Valproic acid)	Developmental	99-66-1	July 1, 1987
Vanadium pentoxide (only orthorhombic)		1314-62-1	
Vinblastine sulfate		143-67-9	
Vinclozolin		50471-44-8	
Vincristine sulfate		2068-78-2	
Vinyl acetate	Cancer	108-05-4	January 3, 2025
Vinyl bromide		593-60-2	
Vinyl chloride		75-01-4	
4-Vinylcyclohexene		100-40-3	
4-Vinyl-1-cyclohexene diepoxide (Vinyl cyclohexenedioxide)		106-87-6	
Vinyl fluoride	Cancer	75-02-5	May 1, 1997
Vinylidene chloride (1,1-Dichloroethylene)	Cancer	75-35-4	December 29, 2017
Vinyl trichloride (1,1,2-Trichloroethane)	Cancer	79-00-5	October 1, 1990
Vismodegib	Developmental Reproductive toxicity (female, male)	879085-55-9	January 27, 2017
Warfarin	Developmental	81-81-2	July 1, 1987
Wood dust	Cancer	–	December 18, 2009
2,6-Xylidine (2,6-Dimethylaniline)	Cancer	87-62-7	January 1, 1991
Zalcitabine	Cancer	7481-89-2	
Zidovudine (AZT)	Cancer	30516-87-1	December 18, 2009
Zileuton	Cancer Developmental Reproductive toxicity (female)	111406-87-2	December 22, 2000

== Chemicals that were formerly listed under California Proposition 65 ==
Formerly on Proposition 65 list
Substance	CAS Registry Number †	Date removed
Bisphenol A (BPA)	80-05-7	April 11, 2013
Allyl chloride	107-05-1	October 29, 1999
Phenyl glycidyl ether	122-60-1	April 4, 2014
α-Methyl styrene	98-83-9	April 4, 2014
tert-Amyl methyl ether	994-05-8	December 13, 2013
n-Butyl glycidyl ether	2426-08-6	April 4, 2014
Chloramphenicol	56-75-7	January 4, 2013
Chlorodibromomethane	124-48-1	October 29, 1999
Chlorsulfuron	64902-72-3	June 6, 2014
Cyclohexanol	108-93-0	January 25, 2002
Diaminotoluene (mixed)	–	November 20, 2015
Dienestrol	84-17-3	January 4, 2013
Diglycidyl ether	2238-07-5	April 4, 2014
2,4-DP (dichloroprop)	120-36-5	January 25, 2002
Ethyl-tert-butyl ether	637-92-3	December 13, 2013
2-Ethylhexanoic acid	149-57-5	December 13, 2013
Isosafrole	120-58-1	December 8, 2006
Methyl isopropyl ketone	563-80-4	April 4, 2014
5-Nitro-o-anisidine	99-59-2	December 8, 2006
p,p'-Oxybis(benzenesulfonyl hydrazide)	80-51-3	December 13, 2013
Saccharin	81-07-2	April 6, 2001
Saccharin, sodium	128-44-9	January 17, 2003
para-Toluidine	106-49-0	October 29, 1999
1,3,5-Triglycidyl-s-triazinetrione	2451-62-9	December 13, 2013
Tris(aziridinyl)-p-benzoquinone (Triaziquone)	68-76-8	December 8, 2006
Zineb	12122-67-7	October 29, 1999

† Numerical identifier assigned by the Chemical Abstracts Service (CAS)

Comments:

- Many substances include its strong acid salts
- Airborne particles of many substances are cancerogenic
- Bisphenol A (BPA) was removed from the list on April 19, 2013, and was relisted on May 11, 2015.
