= List of cigarette smoke carcinogens =

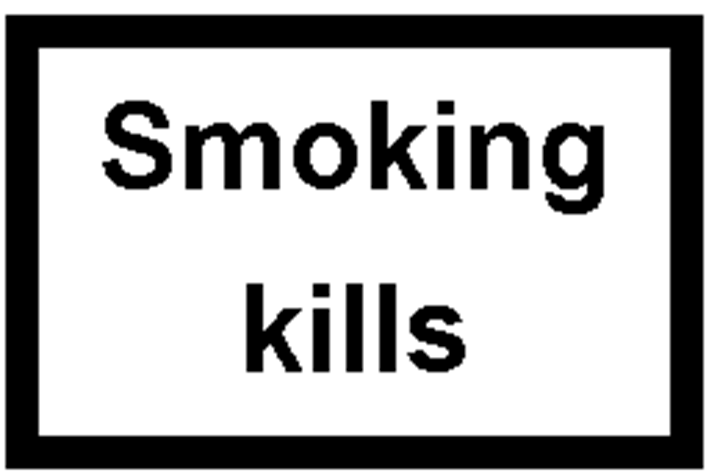
Typical tobacco packaging warning message about the health effect of smoking tobacco

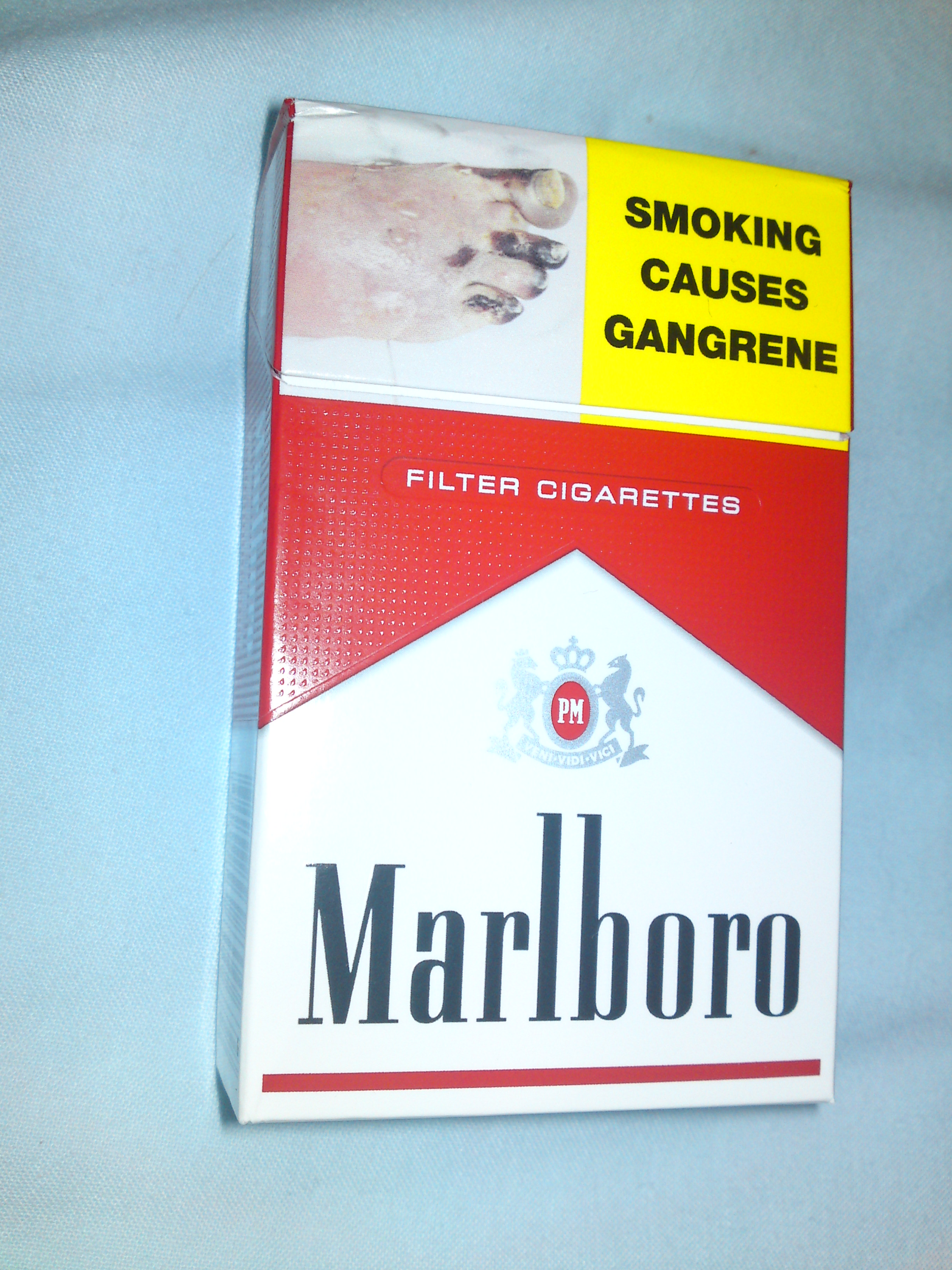
The front of a 20 pack of Marlboro Red cigarettes sold in New Zealand.

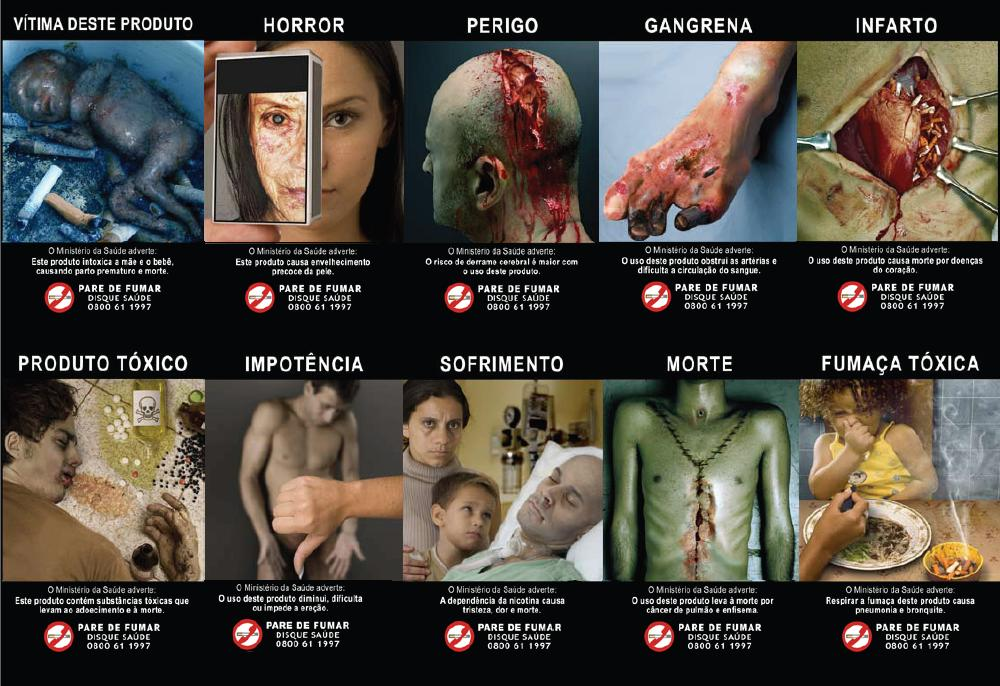
Brazil's third batch of graphic images (since replaced), mandatory on all cigarette packs.

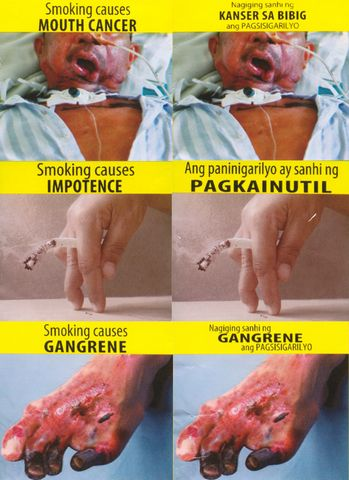
Philippines. Graphic tobacco packaging warning messages from 2016 to 2018.

Commercial tobacco smoke is a mixture of more than 5,000 chemicals. A 2011 report in the International Journal of Environmental Research and Public Health (IJERPH) lists 65 carcinogens or possible carcinogens: "Our list of hazardous smoke components includes all nine components reported in mainstream cigarette smoke that are known human carcinogens (IARC Group I carcinogens), as well as all nine components that are probably carcinogenic to humans (IARC Group 2A carcinogens). In addition, it contains 34 of the 48 components that are possibly carcinogenic to humans (IARC Group 2B carcinogens)."

== IJERPH table ==
- "^{1}Cancer inhalation risk values provide an excess lifetime exposure risk, in this case the human lung cancer risk at a 1 in 100,000 (E-5) level."

Carcinogens or possible carcinogens. IJERPH. Cancer risk value in mg m^{−3}
Smoke component	Cancer risk value^{1}	Institute
1,1,1-Trichloro-2,2-bis(4-chlorophenyl)ethane (DDT)	1.0E-04	U.S. EPA
1,1-Dimethylhydrazine	2.0E-06	ORNL
1,3-Butadiene	3E-04	U.S. EPA
2,3,7,8-Tetrachlorodibenzo-p-dioxin (TEQ)	2.6E-04	Cal EPA
2-Amino-3-methyl-9H-pyrido[2,3-b]indole (MeAaC)	2.9E-05	Cal EPA
2-Amino-3-methylimidazo[4,5-b]quinoline (IQ)	2.5E-05	Cal EPA
2-Amino-6-methyl[1,2-a:3',2"-d]imidazole (GLu-P-1)	7.1E-06	Cal EPA
2-Aminodipyrido[1,2-a:3',2"-d]imidazole (GLu-P-2)	2.5E-05	Cal EPA
2-Aminonaphthalene	2.0E-05	Cal EPA
2-Nitropropane		Cal EPA
2-Toluidine	2.0E-04	Cal EPA
3-Amino-1,4-dimethyl-5H-pyrido [4,3-b]indole (Trp-P-1)	1.4E-06	Cal EPA
3-Amino-1-methyl-5H-pyrido[4,3-b]-indole (Trp-P-2)	1.1E-05	Cal EPA
4-Aminobiphenyl	1.7E-06	Cal EPA
5-Methylchrysene	9.1E-06	Cal EPA
7H-Dibenzo(c,g)carbazole	9.1E-06	Cal EPA
2-Amino-9H-pyrido[2,3-b]indole (AaC)	8.8E-05	Cal EPA
Acetaldehyde	4.5E-03	U.S. EPA
Acetamide	5.0E-04	Cal EPA
Acrylamide	8E-3	
Acrylonitrile	1.5E-04	U.S. EPA
Aniline	B2—probable human carcinogen	U.S. EPA
Arsenic	2.3E-06	U.S. EPA
Benz[a]anthracene	9.1E-05	Cal EPA
Benzene	1.3E-03	U.S. EPA
Benzo[a]pyrene	9.1E-06	Cal EPA
Benzo[j]fluoranthene	9.1E-05	Cal EPA
Beryllium	4.2E-06	
Cadmium	5.6E-06	U.S. EPA
Carbazole	1.8E-03	NATA
Chloroform	4.3E-04	U.S. EPA
Chromium VI	8.3E-07	U.S. EPA
Chrysene	9.1E-04	Cal EPA
Di(2-ethylhexyl) phthalate	4.2E-03	Cal EPA
Dibenzo[a,i]pyrene	9.1E-07	Cal EPA
Dibenzo[a,h]acridine	9.1E-05	Cal EPA
Dibenzo[a,h]anthracene	8.3E-06	Cal EPA
Dibenzo[a,j]acridine	9.1E-05	Cal EPA
Dibenzo[a,h]pyrene	9.1E-07	Cal EPA
Dibenzo[a,l]pyrene	9.1E-07	Cal EPA
Dibenzo[a,e]pyrene	9.1E-06	Cal EPA
Dibenzo[c,g]carbazole	9.1E-06	Cal EPA
Ethyl carbamate	3.5E-05	Cal EPA
Ethylene oxide	1.1E-04	Cal EPA
Ethylenethiourea	7.7E-04	Cal EPA
Formaldehyde	7.7E-04	U.S. EPA
Hydrazine	2.0E-06	U.S. EPA
Indeno(1,2,3-c,d)pyrene	9.1E-05	Cal EPA
Lead	8.3E-04	Cal EPA
N-nitrosodi-n-butylamine (NBUA)	6.3E-06	U.S. EPA
N-nitrosodimethylamine (NDMA)	7.1E-07	U.S. EPA
N-nitrosodiethanolamine	1.3E-05	Cal EPA
N-nitrosodiethylamine	2.3E-07	U.S. EPA
N-nitrosoethylmethylamine	1.6E-06	Cal EPA
N-Nitrosonornicotine (NNN)	2.5E-05	Cal EPA
N-Nitroso-N-propylamine	5.0E-06	Cal EPA
N-nitrosopiperidine	3.7E-06	Cal EPA
N-nitrosopyrrolidine	1.6E-05	U.S. EPA
o-Cresol	C- possible human carcinogen	U.S. EPA
p-Benzoquinone	C- possible human carcinogen	U.S. EPA
p-Cresol	C- possible human carcinogen	U.S. EPA
Polonium-210	925.9	ORNL^{3}
Propylene oxide	2.7E-03	U.S. EPA
Trichloroethylene	82	HC
Vinyl chloride	1.1E-03	U.S. EPA

== See also ==
- Kent, a cigarette that contained a filter made of asbestos.
- Composition of electronic cigarette aerosol
- Health effects of tobacco smoking
- List of additives in cigarettes
