= IARC group 2A =

Probable carcinogens

IARC group 2A agents are substances and exposure circumstances that have been classified as probable carcinogens by the International Agency for Research on Cancer (IARC). This designation is applied when there is limited evidence of carcinogenicity in humans, as well as sufficient evidence of carcinogenicity in experimental animals. In some cases, an agent may be classified in this group when there is inadequate evidence of carcinogenicity in humans along with sufficient evidence of carcinogenicity in experimental animals and strong evidence that the carcinogenesis is mediated by a mechanism that also operates in humans. Exceptionally, an agent may be classified in this group solely on the basis of limited evidence of carcinogenicity in humans.

This list is focusing on the hazard linked to the agents. This means that the carcinogenic agents are capable of causing cancer, but this does not take their risk into account, which is the probability of causing a cancer given the level of exposure to this carcinogenic agent. The list is uptodate as of January 2024.

== Agents ==
=== Substances ===
- Acrolein
- Acrylamide
- Androgenic (anabolic) steroids
- Aniline
- Aniline hydrochloride
- ortho-Anisidine hydrochloride
- Azacitidine
- BCNU (Bischloroethyl nitrosourea)
- 2-Bromopropane
- Captafol
- Chloral
- Chloral hydrate
- Chloramphenicol
- α-Chlorinated toluenes (benzal chloride, benzotrichloride, benzyl chloride) and benzoyl chloride (combined exposures)
- CCNU (1-(2-Chloroethyl)-3-cyclohexyl-1-nitrosourea)
- 4-Chloro-o-toluidine
- Chlorozotocin
- Cisplatin
- Cobalt(II) salts, soluble
- Cyclopenta[c,d]pyrene
- Diazinon
- Dibenz[a,j]acridine
- Dibenz[a,h]anthracene
- Dibenzo[a,l]pyrene
- Dichloromethane (methylene chloride)
- 4,4'-Dichlorodiphenyltrichloroethane (DDT)
- Diethyl sulfate
- Dieldrin, and aldrin metabolized to dieldrin
- Dimethylcarbamoyl chloride
- Dimethylformamide
- 1,2-Dimethylhydrazine
- Dimethyl sulfate
- Doxorubicin
- Epichlorohydrin
- Ethylene dibromide
- Ethyl carbamate (urethane)
- N-Ethyl-N-nitrosourea
- Glycidol
- Glycidyl methacrylate
- Glyphosate
- Hydrazine
- Indium phosphide
- 2-Amino-3-methylimidazo[4,5-f]quinoline (IQ)
- Lead compounds, inorganic
- Malathion
- 5-Methoxypsoralen
- Methyleugenol
- Methyl methanesulfonate
- Mercaptobenzothiozole
- MNNG (N-Methyl-N'-nitro-N-nitrosoguanidine)
- N-Methyl-N-nitrosourea
- Nitrate or nitrite (ingested) under conditions that result in endogenous nitrosation
- ortho-Nitroanisole
- Nitrogen mustard
- 1-Nitropyrene
- N-Nitrosodiethylamine (DEN)
- N-Nitrosodimethylamine (NDMA)
- Nitrotoluene
- 6-Nitrochrysene
- Phenacetin
- Pioglitazone
- Polybrominated biphenyls
- Procarbazine hydrochloride
- 1,3-Propane sultone
- Silicon carbide whiskers
- Styrene (industrial exposure)
- Styrene-7,8-oxide
- Teniposide
- Tetrabromobisphenol A
- 3,3',4,4'-Tetrachloroazobenzene
- Tetrachloroethylene
- Tetrafluoroethylene
- 1,1,1-Trichloroethane
- 1,2,3-Trichloropropane
- Tris(2,3-dibromopropyl) phosphate
- Trivalent antimony
- Vinyl bromide
- Vinyl fluoride

=== Pathogens ===
- Malaria (caused by infection with Plasmodium falciparum in holoendemic areas)
- Human papillomavirus type 68
- Merkel cell polyomavirus (MCV)

=== Mixtures ===
- Bitumens, occupational exposure to oxidized bitumens and their emissions during roofing
- Creosotes (from coal tars)
- High-temperature frying, emissions from
- Household combustion of biomass fuel (primarily wood), indoor emissions from
- Non-arsenical insecticides (occupational exposures in spraying and application of)
- Red meat (consumption of)
- Mate, hot (see Very hot beverages)
- Very hot beverages at above 65 °C (drinking)

=== Exposure circumstances ===
- Art glass, glass containers and pressed ware (manufacture of)
- Carbon electrode manufacture
- Cobalt metal with tungsten carbide
- Cobalt metal without tungsten carbide or other metal alloys
- Hairdresser or barber (occupational exposure as a)
- Petroleum refining (occupational exposures in)
- Night shift work

== See also ==
- IARC group 1
- IARC group 2B
- IARC group 3
