= Mycobacterium vanbaalenii =

Scientific classification
- Domain: Bacteria
- Kingdom: Bacillati
- Phylum: Actinomycetota
- Class: Actinomycetes
- Order: Mycobacteriales
- Family: Mycobacteriaceae
- Genus: Mycobacterium
- Species: M. vanbaalenii

Binomial name
- Mycobacterium vanbaalenii Khan et al. 2002, DSM 7251

Species of bacterium

Mycobacterium vanbaalenii is a rapidly growing mycobacterium that can use polycyclic aromatic hydrocarbons. It was first isolated from petroleum-contaminated estuarine sediments and has been shown by 16S rRNA gene sequencing to be closely related to Mycobacterium aurum and Mycobacterium vaccae. M. vanbaalenii has potential use in the bioremediation of polycyclic aromatic hydrocarbon contaminated environmental sites. Etymology: vanbaalenii of Van Baalen, in memory of Dr Chase Van Baalen, late Professor at The University of Texas Marine Science Institute, Port Aransas Marine Laboratory, Port Aransas, TX, USA.

== Description ==
Microscopy

- Gram-positive, acid-fast rods (1.4 um long and 0.7 um wide)

Colony characteristics

- Colonies are smooth and saffron yellow.

Physiology

- Can grow well at 24 and 37 °C, with minimal or no growth at 42 °C.
- Classified as a rapidly growing Mycobacterium species
- Cells are aerobic, Catalase- and urease-positive, reduce nitrate to nitrite.
- metabolizes salicylic acid, hydrolyses Tween 80, reduces tellurite and uses pyrene, anthracene, fluoranthene, naphthalene, phenanthrene, 1-nitropyrene, 6-nitrochrysene, 3-methylcholanthrene and benzopyrene.

== Pathogenesis ==
- First isolated from an environmental source, not known to be pathogenic.

== Type strain ==
- Strain PYR-1 = DSM 7251 = JCM 13017 = NRRL B-24157.
