= Cyclopenta(cd)pyrene =

Names
- IUPAC name Cyclopenta[cd]pyrene
- Other names Acepyrene; pentacyclo[12.3.1.0^{4,17}.0^{7,16}.0^{10,15}]octadeca-1(18),2,4(17),5,7(16),8,10(15),11,13-nonaene

Identifiers
CAS Number	27208-37-3
3D model (JSmol)	Interactive image
ChEBI	CHEBI:82279
ChEMBL	ChEMBL350278
ChemSpider	31107
EC Number	690-388-3
KEGG	C19173
PubChem CID	33743
UNII	29XD62TN4D
CompTox Dashboard (EPA)	DTXSID7074822
- InChI: InChI=1S/C18H10/c1-2-11-4-6-13-7-5-12-8-9-15-10-14(3-1)16(11)18(13)17(12)15/h1-10H Key: BZCXQYVNASLLQO-UHFFFAOYSA-N
- SMILES: C1=CC2=C3C(=C1)C=C4C=CC5=C4C3=C(C=C2)C=C5

Properties
Chemical formula	C_{18}H_{10}
Molar mass	226.278 g·mol^{−1}
- Except where otherwise noted, data are given for materials in their standard state (at 25 °C [77 °F], 100 kPa). Infobox references

Cyclopenta[cd]pyrene, also known as acepyrene, is a polycyclic aromatic hydrocarbon (PAH). It has a chemical formula of C18H10. It is a member of the group of pyrenes.

It is an aromatic hydrocarbon that consists of five fused rings and is formed during the incomplete combustion of organic matter. It is primarily found in gasoline engine exhaust. This substance is used in laboratory research as a mutagen and carcinogen. It is also reasonably anticipated to be a human carcinogen.

Its molecular weight is 226.3 g/mol. According to the MeSH Pharmacological Classification, it is a mutagen and carcinogen. According to IARC, it is classified as "IARC group 2A" (Probably carcinogenic to humans).
