= Lead(II) phosphate =

Names
- Systematic IUPAC name Lead(II) phosphate

Identifiers
CAS Number	7446-27-7
3D model (JSmol)	Interactive image
ChemSpider	22442
ECHA InfoCard	100.028.368
EC Number	231-205-5
PubChem CID	24009
RTECS number	OG3675000
UNII	62I1T06190
UN number	3288 2291
CompTox Dashboard (EPA)	DTXSID5064706
- InChI: InChI=1S/2H3O4P.3Pb/c2*1-5(2,3)4;;;/h2*(H3,1,2,3,4);;;/q;;3*+2/p-6 Key: HUTDDBSSHVOYJR-UHFFFAOYSA-H
- SMILES: [O-]P(=O)([O-])[O-].[O-]P(=O)([O-])[O-].[Pb+2].[Pb+2].[Pb+2]

Properties
Chemical formula	Pb_{3}(PO_{4})_{2}
Molar mass	811.54272 g/mol
Appearance	white powder
Density	6.9 g/cm^{3}
Melting point	1,014 °C (1,857 °F; 1,287 K)
Solubility in water	0.000014 g/100 mL
Solubility	insoluble in alcohol soluble in nitric acid
Magnetic susceptibility (χ)	−182.0·10^{−6} cm^{3}/mol
Refractive index (n_{D})	2.048

Hazards
- GHS labelling
Pictograms	(GHS08: Health hazard) (GHS09: Environmental hazard)
Signal word	Warning
Hazard statements	H360Df, H373, H410
Precautionary statements	P203, P260, P273, P280, P318, P319, P391, P405, P501
- Except where otherwise noted, data are given for materials in their standard state (at 25 °C [77 °F], 100 kPa). verify (what is ?) Infobox references

Lead(II) phosphate is an ionic compound with chemical formula Pb_{3}(PO_{4})_{2}. Lead(II) phosphate is a long-lived electronically neutral reagent chemical. Despite limited tests on humans, it has been identified as a carcinogen based on tests on animals conducted by the EPA. Lead(II) phosphate appears as hexagonal, colorless crystals or as a white powder. Lead(II) phosphate is insoluble in water and alcohol but soluble in nitric acid (HNO_{3}) and fused alkali metal hydroxides. When lead(II) phosphate is heated for decomposition it emits very toxic fumes containing Lead (Pb) and PO_{x}.

== Preparation ==
It is prepared by reacting lead(II) hydroxide with orthophosphoric acid.

3Pb(OH)_{2} + 2H_{3}PO_{4} → Pb_{3}(PO_{4})_{2} + 6H_{2}O
