= N-Nitrosodiethylamine =

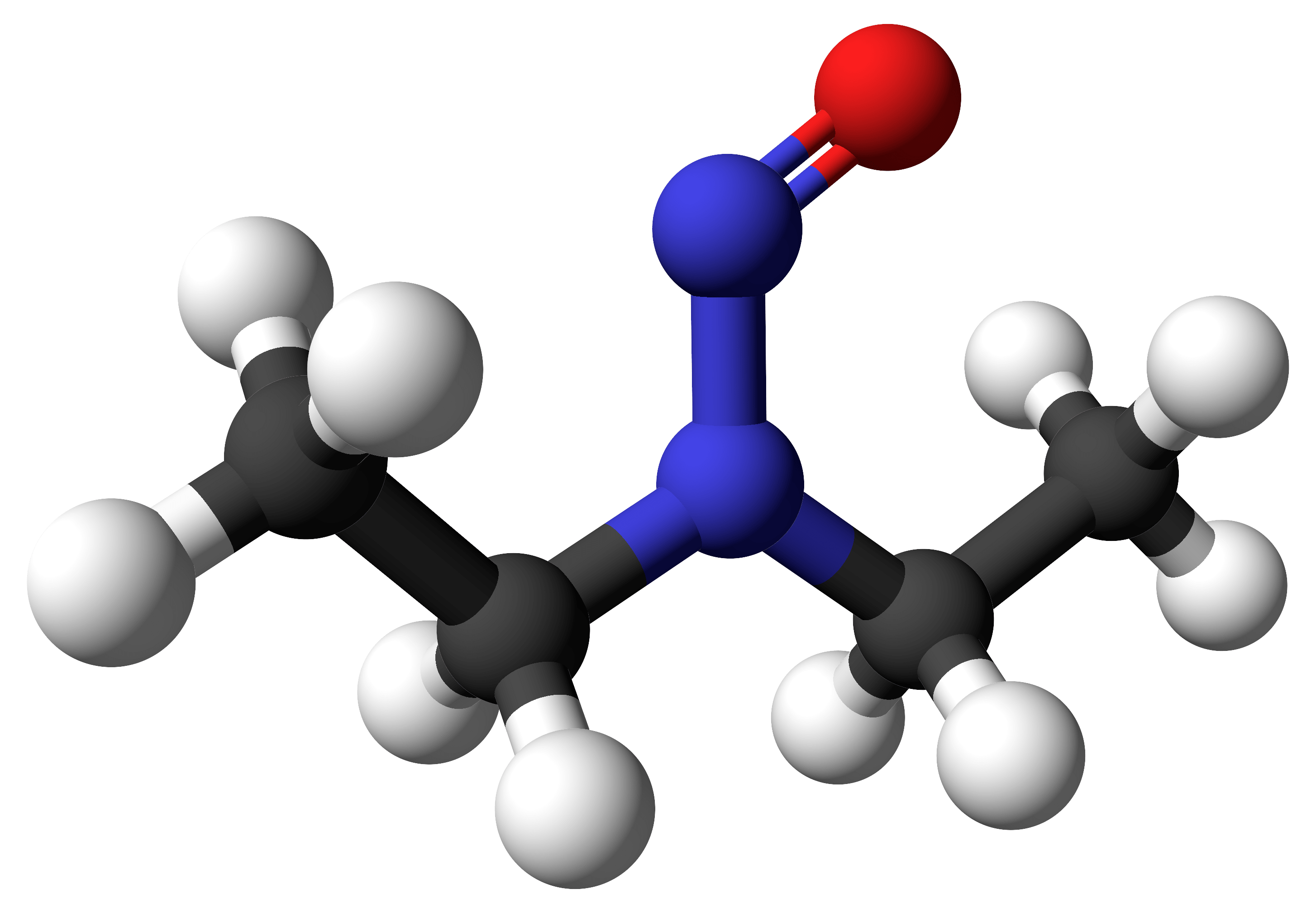
- Ball-and-stick model of nitrosodiethylamine

Names
- Preferred IUPAC name Diethylnitrous amide
- Other names N-Ethyl-N-nitrosoethanamine; Diethylnitrosamine; DENA; NDEA

Identifiers
CAS Number	55-18-5
3D model (JSmol)	Interactive image
ChEBI	CHEBI:34873
ChemSpider	5708
ECHA InfoCard	100.000.206
EC Number	214-237-4
KEGG	C14422
MeSH	D004052
PubChem CID	5921
UNII	3IQ78TTX1A
CompTox Dashboard (EPA)	DTXSID2021028
- InChI: InChI=1S/C4H10N2O/c1-3-6(4-2)5-7/h3-4H2,1-2H3 Key: WBNQDOYYEUMPFS-UHFFFAOYSA-N
- SMILES: CCN(CC)N=O

Properties
Chemical formula	C_{4}H_{10}N_{2}O
Molar mass	102.137 g·mol^{−1}
Appearance	Yellow liquid
Density	0.95 g/mL
Boiling point	177 °C (351 °F; 450 K)
Magnetic susceptibility (χ)	−59.3·10^{−6} cm^{3}/mol

Related compounds
Related compounds	Diethylamine, N-Nitrosodimethylamine
- Except where otherwise noted, data are given for materials in their standard state (at 25 °C [77 °F], 100 kPa). Infobox references

N-Nitrosodiethylamine (NDEA) is an organic compound with the formula Et_{2}NNO (Et = C_{2}H_{5}). A member of the nitrosamines, it is a light-sensitive, volatile, clear yellow oil that is soluble in water, lipids, and other organic solvents. It has an amine or aromatic odor. It is used as gasoline and lubricant additive, antioxidant, and stabilizer for industry materials. When heated to decomposition, N-nitrosodiethylamine emits toxic fumes of nitrogen oxides. N-Nitrosodiethylamine affects DNA integrity, probably by alkylation, and is used in experimental research to induce liver tumorigenesis. It is carcinogenic and mutagenic. NDEA has also been found to perturb amino acid biosynthesis including arginine, as well as DNA damage repair and mitochondrial genome maintenance in yeast.

It is found in tobacco smoke.

It is classified as a Group 2A carcinogen (probable human carcinogen) by the World Health Organization.

== NDEA involvement in recalls ==
In the year 2019, NDEA was found as an impurity in valsartan and other angiotensin II receptor blockers (ARBs) used to treat high blood pressure and heart failure. The U.S. Food and Drug Administration has confirmed levels of NDEA and/or NDMA exceeding the interim acceptable intake limits, and the affected medicines were recalled.
