= Methazole =

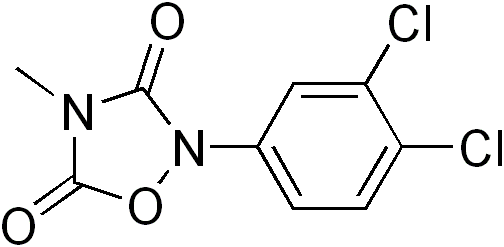

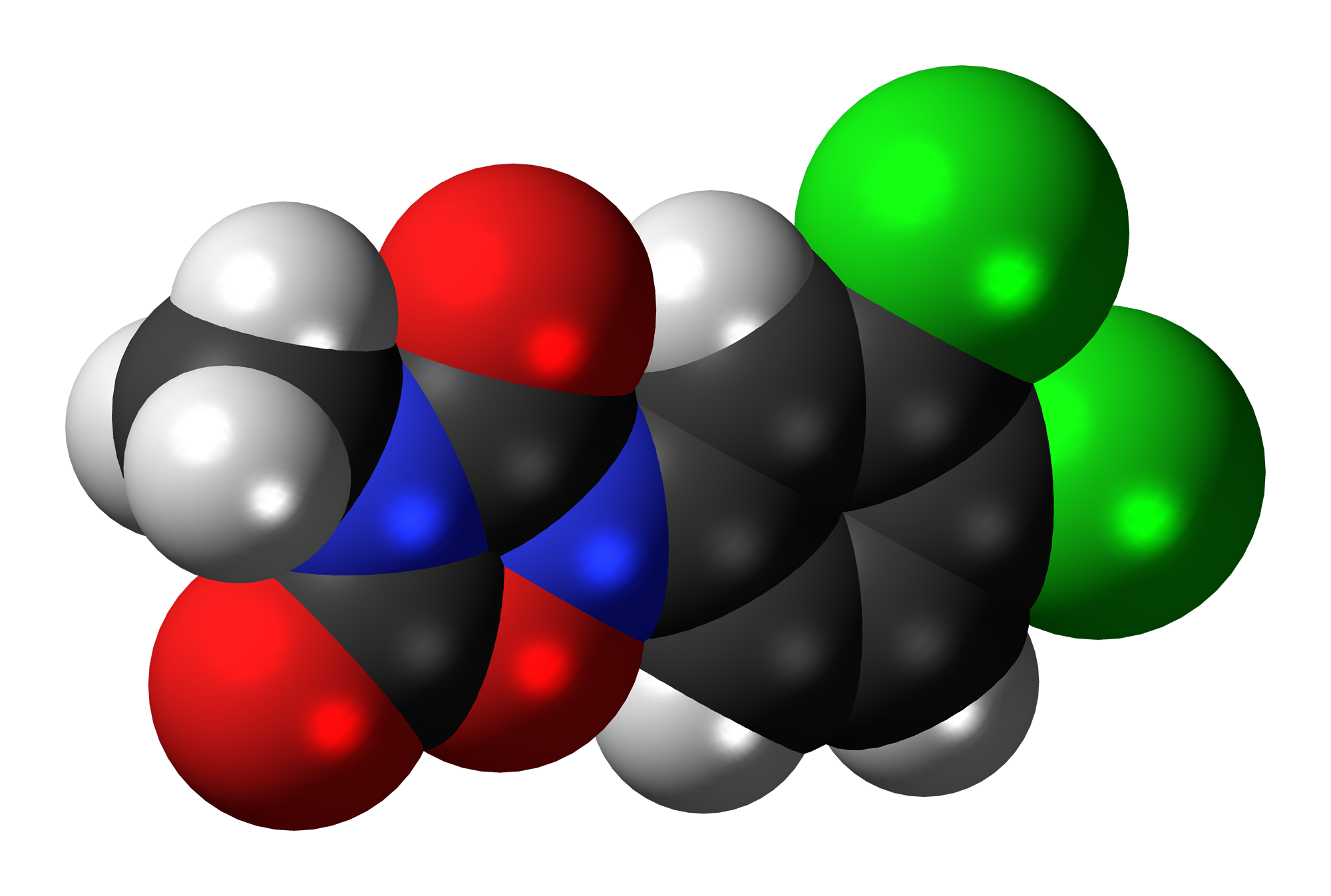

Names
- Preferred IUPAC name 2-(3,4-Dichlorophenyl)-4-methyl-1,2,4-oxadiazolidine-3,5-dione
- Other names Metazole; Oxydiazol; VCS 438; Paxilon; Probe; Metazol; Mezopur; Oxydiazol; Bioxone; Chlormethazole

Identifiers
CAS Number	20354-26-1
3D model (JSmol)	Interactive image
ChemSpider	4528
ECHA InfoCard	100.039.767
KEGG	C19123
PubChem CID	4690
UNII	E35M7EMD3V
CompTox Dashboard (EPA)	DTXSID1040293
- InChI: InChI=1S/C9H6Cl2N2O3/c1-12-8(14)13(16-9(12)15)5-2-3-6(10)7(11)4-5/h2-4H,1H3 Key: LRUUNMYPIBZBQH-UHFFFAOYSA-N; InChI=1/C9H6Cl2N2O3/c1-12-8(14)13(16-9(12)15)5-2-3-6(10)7(11)4-5/h2-4H,1H3 Key: LRUUNMYPIBZBQH-UHFFFAOYAP
- SMILES: CN1C(=O)N(OC1=O)C2=CC(=C(C=C2)Cl)Cl

Properties
Chemical formula	C_{9}H_{6}Cl_{2}N_{2}O_{3}
Molar mass	261.06 g·mol^{−1}
- Except where otherwise noted, data are given for materials in their standard state (at 25 °C [77 °F], 100 kPa). verify (what is ?) Infobox references

Methazole (C_{9}H_{6}Cl_{2}N_{2}O_{3}) is an obsolete herbicide in the family of herbicides known as oxadiazolones. It was used as a post-emergent treatment for controlling weeds.
