= Fusarin =

Fusarins are a class of mycotoxins produced mainly by fungi of the genus Fusarium, which can infect agriculturally important crops such as wheat, barley, oats, rye, and corn. Chemically, they are polyketides that are also derived from amino acids.

Some members of the class, particularly fusarin C, are mutagenic.

Examples:

Fusarin A

Fusarin C

Fusarin D
