= Direct Black 38 =

Synthetic benzidine-based azo dye

- Chemical structure of Direct Black 38

Names
- IUPAC name disodium 4-amino-3-[[(4'-{[(2,4-diaminophenyl)diazenyl]}-4-biphenylyl)diazenyl]]-5-hydroxy-6-(phenyldiazenyl)naphthalene-2,7-disulfonate
- Other names Chlorazol Black E C.I. 30235; Direct Deep Black; Azo Black

Identifiers
CAS Number	1937-37-7
3D model (JSmol)	Interactive image
ChEMBL	ChEMBL3182776; acid: ChEMBL1093278
ChemSpider	4447430
ECHA InfoCard	100.016.101
EC Number	217-710-3
PubChem CID	5284349
UNII	C7SV16SLWM
CompTox Dashboard (EPA)	DTXSID7020184
- InChI: Key: XRPLBRIHZGVJIC-UHFFFAOYSA-L; InChI=1S/C34H27N9O7S2.2Na/c35-22-10-15-27(26(36)18-22)41-38-24-11-6-19(7-12-24)20-8-13-25(14-9-20)40-42-32-28(51(45,46)47)16-21-17-29(52(48,49)50)33(44)31(23-4-2-1-3-5-23)43-39-34(21)30(32)37;;/h1-18,44H,35-36H2,(H,45,46,47)(H,48,49,50);;/q;2*+1/p-2
- SMILES: [Na+].[Na+].Nc1ccc(N=Nc2ccc(cc2)c3ccc(cc3)N=Nc4c(N)c5c(O)c(N=Nc6ccccc6)c(cc5cc4S(=O)(=O)[O-])S(=O)(=O)[O-])c(N)c1

Properties
Chemical formula	C_{34}H_{25}N_{9}Na_{2}O_{7}S_{2}
Molar mass	781.73 g/mol
Appearance	Gray-black microcrystals or dark powder
Solubility in water	Soluble in water (~40 g/L at 85 °C)
Solubility	Soluble in DMSO, moderately soluble in ethanol

Hazards
- Occupational safety and health (OHS/OSH)
Main hazards	Carcinogen (metabolizes to benzidine in vivo), Irritant
- GHS labelling
Pictograms	(GHS07: Exclamation mark) (GHS08: Health hazard)
Hazard statements	H315, H319, H350, H361d
Precautionary statements	P201, P280, P305+P351+P338, P308+P313
- Except where otherwise noted, data are given for materials in their standard state (at 25 °C [77 °F], 100 kPa). Infobox references

Direct Black 38, also known as Chlorazol Black E or C.I. 30235, is a synthetic benzidine-based azo dye. In the past, it has been used to color items such as paper, leather, or textiles, and to stain biological specimens. However, today it is primarily for research, as studies have found it to be carcinogenic.

== Chemistry ==
Direct Black 38 is a synthetic azo dye derived from benzidine. Its structure contains a biphenyl group linked by azo bonds to aromatic groups derived from 8-amino-1-naphthol-3,6-disulfonic acid, aniline, and m-phenylenediamine. The compound is commonly produced as a disodium salt, with two sulfonate groups that increase its solubility in water.

== Applications ==
Direct Black 38 was widely used as a direct dye because it can bind to cellulose fibers, cotton, leather, paper, and more. In laboratories, it was used as a biological stain under the name Chlorazol Black E, to color tissue samples and cell structures for microscopic viewing.

Direct Black 38's uses are limited nowadays because animal testing studies have shown that it causes cancer; the dye can be metabolized to benzidine, a known human carcinogen. Direct Black 38 is used in research on azo dye degradation and wastewater treatment.

== Hazards ==
Direct Black 38 is classified as a carcinogen. The dye can break down through metabolic processes, releasing benzidine, a known human carcinogen associated with bladder cancer. Its carcinogenic properties have led to restrictions on its use in many regions.
