= Phenyl glycidyl ether =

Names
- IUPAC name 2-(phenoxymethyl)oxirane
- Other names Phenyl glycidyl ether; Phenylglycidyl ether; Phenol glycidyl ether; Phenol-glycidaether; Phenoxypropene oxide; Phenoxypropylene oxide; Phenyl 2,3-epoxypropyl ether; Phenylglycydyl ether; Propane, 1,2-epoxy-3-phenoxy-; Oxirane, 2-(phenoxymethyl)-

Identifiers
| CAS Number | 122-60-1 |
| 3D model (JSmol) | Interactive image |
| ChEBI | CHEBI:82367 |
| ChEMBL | ChEMBL1568222 |
| ChemSpider | 28958 |
| ECHA InfoCard | 100.004.144 |
| EC Number | 204-557-2 |
| KEGG | C19291 |
| PubChem CID | 31217 |
| RTECS number | TZ3675000 |
| UNII | 44KJQ1655I |
| UN number | 2810 |
| CompTox Dashboard (EPA) | DTXSID8021145 |
- InChI: InChI=1S/C9H10O2/c1-2-4-8(5-3-1)10-6-9-7-11-9/h1-5,9H,6-7H2 Key: FQYUMYWMJTYZTK-UHFFFAOYSA-N
- SMILES: C1C(O1)COC2=CC=CC=C2

Properties
| Chemical formula | C_{9}H_{10}O_{2} |
| Molar mass | 150.177 g·mol^{−1} |
| Melting point | 3.5 °C (38.3 °F; 276.6 K) |
| Boiling point | 245 °C (473 °F; 518 K) |

Hazards
- GHS labelling
| Pictograms | (GHS07: Exclamation mark) (GHS08: Health hazard) |
| Signal word | Warning |
| Hazard statements | H315, H317, H332, H335, H341, H350, H412 |
| Precautionary statements | P203, P261, P264, P271, P272, P273, P280, P281, P302+P352, P304+P340, P317, P318, P319, P321, P332+P317, P333+P313, P362+P364, P403+P233, P405, P501 |
- Except where otherwise noted, data are given for materials in their standard state (at 25 °C [77 °F], 100 kPa). Infobox references

Phenyl glycidyl ether, is a liquid aromatic organic chemical in the glycidyl ether class of compounds. It has the formula C_{9}H_{10}O_{2}. It has the CAS Registry Number 122-60-1 and the IUPAC name of 2-(phenoxymethyl)oxirane. A key use is in the viscosity reduction of epoxy resin systems. It is REACH registered and on EINECS under the name 2,3-epoxypropyl phenyl ether.

== Manufacture ==
Phenol and epichlorohydrin are reacted in the presence of a base and not a Lewis acid catalyst as normal with glycidyl ethers. A halohydrin is formed. This is followed by washing with sodium hydroxide in dehydrochlorination step. This forms phenyl glycidyl ether. The waste products are water and sodium chloride and excess caustic soda. One of the quality control tests would involve measuring the Epoxy value by determination of the epoxy equivalent weight.

== Other names ==
- phenyl glycidyl ether
- phenol glycidyl ether
- 1,2-Epoxy-3-phenoxypropane
- 1-Phenoxy-2,3-epoxypropane
- 2,3-Epoxy-1-phenoxypropane
- 2,3-Epoxypropyl phenyl ether
- 3-phenoxy-1,2-epoxypropane
- benzene, (2,3-epoxypropoxy)-
- Ether, 2,3-epoxypropyl phenyl
- Glycidyl phenyl ether
- Oxirane, (phenoxymethyl)-
- propane, 1,2-epoxy-3-phenoxy-

== Uses ==
It has been used for lowering the viscosity of epoxy resins. It undergoes anionic polymerization. It is one of a number of glycidyl ethers available commercially that are used to reduce the viscosity of epoxy resins. These are then further used in coatings, sealants, adhesives and elastomers. The use of the diluent does effect mechanical properties and microstructure of epoxy resins.

== Toxicology ==
It has caused cancer in laboratory animals. It is also listed as a California Proposition 65 chemical. It is specifically mentioned by OSHA.

== See also ==
- Epoxide
- Glycidol
