= Triadimefon =

Names
- IUPAC name 1-(4-Chlorophenoxy)-3,3-dimethyl-1-(1H-1,2,4-triazol-1-yl)butan-2-one
- Other names Triadimeform, Strike, Miltek, Nurex, Reach.

Identifiers
CAS Number	43121-43-3
3D model (JSmol)	Interactive image
ChEBI	CHEBI:9665
ChemSpider	36029
ECHA InfoCard	100.050.986
PubChem CID	39385
UNII	1HW039CJF0
CompTox Dashboard (EPA)	DTXSID3023897
- InChI: InChI=1S/C14H16ClN3O2/c1-14(2,3)12(19)13(18-9-16-8-17-18)20-11-6-4-10(15)5-7-11/h4-9,13H,1-3H3 Key: WURBVZBTWMNKQT-UHFFFAOYSA-N; InChI=1/C14H16ClN3O2/c1-14(2,3)12(19)13(18-9-16-8-17-18)20-11-6-4-10(15)5-7-11/h4-9,13H,1-3H3 Key: WURBVZBTWMNKQT-UHFFFAOYAV
- SMILES: CC(C)(C)C(=O)C(N1C=NC=N1)OC2=CC=C(C=C2)Cl

Properties
Chemical formula	C_{14}H_{16}ClN_{3}O_{2}
Molar mass	293.75 g·mol^{−1}
Density	1.22 g/cm^{3}
Melting point	82 °C (180 °F; 355 K)
Boiling point	decomposes
Solubility in water	64 mg/L (20 °C)

Hazards
- Lethal dose or concentration (LD, LC)
LD_{50} (median dose)	363 mg/kg (oral, rat) > 5000 mg/kg (dermal, rat)
- Except where otherwise noted, data are given for materials in their standard state (at 25 °C [77 °F], 100 kPa). Infobox references

Triadimefon is a fungicide used in agriculture to control various fungal diseases. As a seed treatment, it is used on barley, corn, cotton, oats, rye, sorghum, and wheat. In fruit it is used on pineapple and banana. Non-food uses include pine seedlings, Christmas trees, turf, ornamental plants, and landscaping.

== Pharmacology ==
Estrogenic effect, inhibition of aromatase activity, decrease of estrogens production and increase androgens availability.

Triadimefon potently inhibited rat’s neurosteroidogenic enzymes, 5α-Red1 and 3α-HSD.

Dopamine as well as serotonergic pathways are involved.

Psychomotor stimulatory. Anti-estrogen effect.
