= 5-Methylchrysene =

Identifiers
CAS Number	3697-24-3
3D model (JSmol)	Interactive image
ChEBI	CHEBI:82342
ChEMBL	ChEMBL1797269
ChemSpider	18309
ECHA InfoCard	100.207.056
EC Number	681-936-2
KEGG	C19259
PubChem CID	19427
UNII	O66195MC8L
CompTox Dashboard (EPA)	DTXSID6063143
- InChI: InChI=1S/C19H14/c1-13-12-15-7-3-4-8-16(15)18-11-10-14-6-2-5-9-17(14)19(13)18/h2-12H,1H3 Key: GOHBXWHNJHENRX-UHFFFAOYSA-N
- SMILES: CC1=CC2=CC=CC=C2C3=C1C4=CC=CC=C4C=C3

Properties
Chemical formula	C_{19}H_{14}
Molar mass	242.321 g·mol^{−1}
Solubility in water	0.062 mg/L at 27 °C

Hazards
- GHS labelling
Pictograms	(GHS05: Corrosive) (GHS07: Exclamation mark) (GHS08: Health hazard) (GHS09: Environmental hazard)
Signal word	Danger
Hazard statements	H302, H318, H350, H351, H410
Precautionary statements	P203, P264, P264+P265, P270, P273, P280, P301+P317, P305+P354+P338, P317, P318, P330, P391, P405, P501
- NIOSH (US health exposure limits)
PEL (Permissible)	0.2 mg/m^{3}
- Except where otherwise noted, data are given for materials in their standard state (at 25 °C [77 °F], 100 kPa). Infobox references

5-Methylchrysene is a polycyclic aromatic hydrocarbon (PAH) with a molecular weight of 242.3 g/mol and melting point of 117.5 °C (243.5°F). The chemical formula of it is C_{19}H_{14}. It has a vapour pressure of 0.00000025 mmHg. It can cause cancer according to an independent committee of scientific and health experts (California Office of Environmental Health Hazard Assessment (OEHHA)). It appears as purple crystals and it is water insoluble (0.062 mg/L at 27 °C)(80.6°F)but soluble in acetone. It is a carbopolycyclic compound.

5-Methylchrysene is a member of a group of chemicals called polycyclic aromatic hydrocarbons (PAHs). 5-Methylchrysene is a product of incomplete combustion and as a component of tobacco and marijuana smoke, which will result in its direct release to the natural environment. There is no commercial production of this compound. 5-Methylchrysene is formed during the incomplete burning of coal, oil, gas, wood, garbage, or other organic substances. PAHs generally occur as complex mixtures, for example as part of combustion products such as soot, not as single compounds. PAHs occur naturally in volcanoes and forest fires. They can also be found in substances such as crude oil and coal. They are found throughout the environment in the air, water, and soil.

It is a solid that exhibits a brilliant bluish-violet fluorescence in ultraviolet (= UV) light. When heated to decomposition it emits acrid smoke & irritating fumes. According to the MeSH Pharmacological Classification it is a carcinogen.

It has an OSHA Permissible Exposure Limit (=PEL)over an 8 hours Time Weighted Average (= TWA) of 0.2 mg/m^{3}. This is also the Threshold Limit Values (TLV).

NIOSH recommends a 10 Hours Time-Weighted Average (= TWA) Exposure Limit (= EL) of 0.1 mg/m^{3}. NIOSH considers coal tar pitch volatiles to be potential occupational carcinogens. NIOSH usually recommends that occupational exposures to carcinogens be limited to the lowest feasible concentration.

Indoor air particulate samples (<10 um) were collected in Chinese homes from Xuan Wei county burning smokey coal, smokeless coal, and wood in 1983 and 1984; the concentration of 5-methylchrysene was 1.6 to 17 ug/m^{3}, 0.21 to 3.5 ug/m^{3}, and 0.03 to 0.05 ug/m^{3}, respectively. Sampling was conducted in March and September, 2011. 5-Methylchrysene was detected outdoors at 21 and 13 pg/m^{3} in PM2.5 samples within 10 m of an 8-lane highway in Raleigh, NC, with an annual average daily traffic count of 125,000 vehicles and a parallel secondary road of 200 vehicles/day 275 m distant from the highway collection site, respectively.

Concentrations in mainstream smoke of US domestic brand cigarettes at a range of 2.5-3.9 ng/cigarette; limit of detection in smoke = 0.94 pg.

Dust/air mixture may ignite and explode. Vigorous reactions, sometimes amounting to explosions, can result from the contact between aromatic hydrocarbons, such as 5-METHYLCHRYSENE, and strong oxidizing agents. They can react exothermically with bases and with diazo compounds. Substitution at the benzene nucleus occurs by halogenation (acid catalyst), nitration, sulfonation, and the Friedel-Crafts reaction.

There is sufficient evidence in experimental animals for the carcinogenicity of 5-methylchrysene. 5-Methylchrysene is also possibly carcinogenic to humans (IARC Group 2B).

Associated disorders and diseases are adenoma, carcinoma, sarcoma, liver- and ling-neoplasms.
