= Captafol =

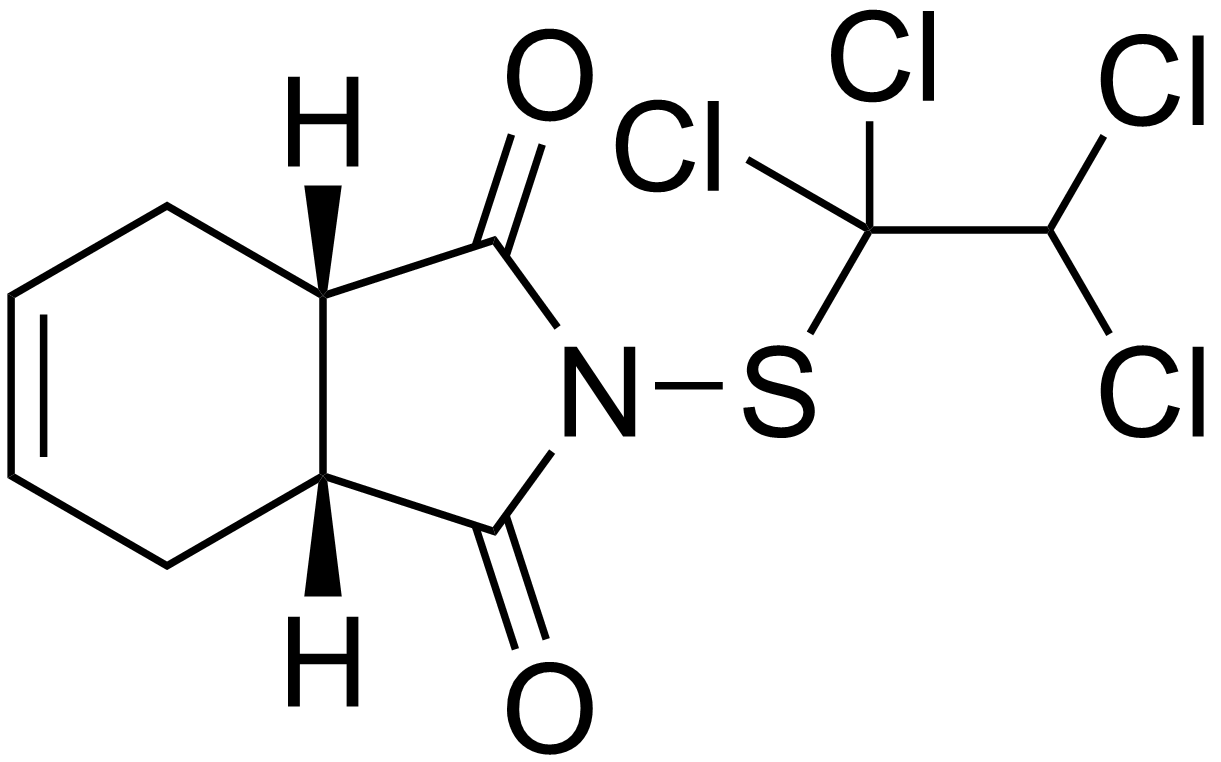

Names
- Preferred IUPAC name (3aR,7aS)-2-[(1,1,2,2-Tetrachloroethyl)sulfanyl]-3a,4,7,7a-tetrahydro-1H-isoindole-1,3(2H)-dione
- Other names cis-Captafol; Merpafol; Crisfolatan; Sulfonimide; Sulpheimide; Arborseal; Captaspor; Mycodifol; Pillartan; Terrazol; Difolatan

Identifiers
CAS Number	2425-06-1
3D model (JSmol)	Interactive image
ChEBI	CHEBI:81938
ChemSpider	17215880
ECHA InfoCard	100.017.604
KEGG	C18754
PubChem CID	17038
UNII	D88BWD4H64
CompTox Dashboard (EPA)	DTXSID4020242
- InChI: InChI=1S/C10H9Cl4NO2S/c11-9(12)10(13,14)18-15-7(16)5-3-1-2-4-6(5)8(15)17/h1-2,5-6,9H,3-4H2/t5-,6+ Key: JHRWWRDRBPCWTF-OLQVQODUSA-N; InChI=1/C10H9Cl4NO2S/c11-9(12)10(13,14)18-15-7(16)5-3-1-2-4-6(5)8(15)17/h1-2,5-6,9H,3-4H2/t5-,6+ Key: JHRWWRDRBPCWTF-OLQVQODUBH
- SMILES: ClC(Cl)C(Cl)(Cl)SN1C(=O)[C@H]2C\C=C/C[C@H]2C1=O

Properties
Chemical formula	C_{10}H_{9}Cl_{4}NO_{2}S
Molar mass	349.05 g·mol^{−1}
Appearance	White, crystalline solid
Melting point	161 °C; 321 °F; 434 K
Boiling point	decomposes
Solubility in water	0.0001%
Vapor pressure	0.000008 mmHg (20°C)

Hazards
- Occupational safety and health (OHS/OSH)
Main hazards	potential occupational carcinogen
Flash point	noncombustible
- NIOSH (US health exposure limits)
PEL (Permissible)	none
REL (Recommended)	Ca TWA 0.1 mg/m^{3} [skin]
IDLH (Immediate danger)	N.D.
- Except where otherwise noted, data are given for materials in their standard state (at 25 °C [77 °F], 100 kPa). verify (what is ?) Infobox references

Captafol is a fungicide. It is used to control almost all fungal diseases of plants except powdery mildews. It is believed to be a human carcinogen, and production for use as a fungicide in the United States stopped in 1987. Its continued use from existing stocks was allowed, but in 1999 the Environmental Protection Agency banned its use on all crops except onions, potatoes, and tomatoes. In 2006 even these exceptions were disallowed, so currently its use on all crops is banned in the United States. Several other countries have followed suit since 2000, and as of 2010, no countries are known to allow the use of captafol on food crops. Currently, the National Institute for Occupational Safety and Health established a recommended exposure limit of 0.1 mg/m^{3} for dermal exposures.

Captafol was disclosed in US patent 3,178,447 (1965). Its synergistic mixture with thiabendazole was described in US patent 4092422 (1978).

International trade in captafol is regulated by the Rotterdam Convention.

== Synthesis ==
Captafol can be obtained by reacting the sodium salt of 1,2,3,6-Tetrahydrophthalimide in benzene with 1,1,2,2-Tetrachloroethylsulfenyl chloride.

Synthesis of Captafol
