= Anilinium chloride =

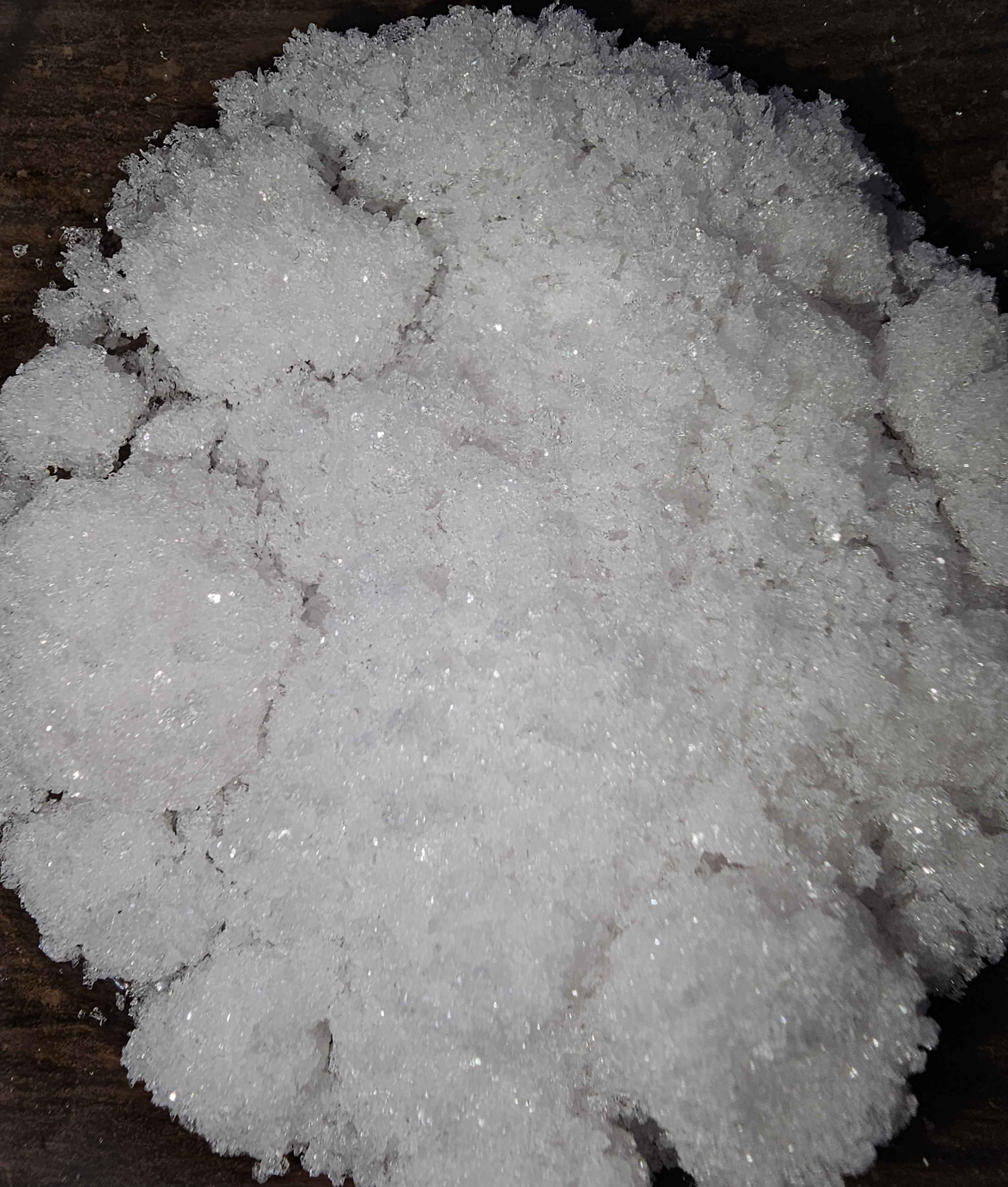

Identifiers
CAS Number	142-04-1
3D model (JSmol)	Interactive image
ChEMBL	ChEMBL3182415
ChemSpider	8536
ECHA InfoCard	100.005.018
EC Number	205-519-8
PubChem CID	8870
UNII	576R1193YL
UN number	1548
CompTox Dashboard (EPA)	DTXSID3020091
- InChI: InChI=1S/C6H7N.ClH/c7-6-4-2-1-3-5-6;/h1-5H,7H2;1H Key: MMCPOSDMTGQNKG-UHFFFAOYSA-N
- SMILES: C1=CC=C(C=C1)N.Cl

Properties
Chemical formula	C_{6}H_{5}NH^{+}_{3}Cl^{−}
Molar mass	129.59 g·mol^{−1}
Appearance	white solid
Density	1.68 g/cm^{3}
Melting point	196 °C (385 °F; 469 K)
Boiling point	245 °C (473 °F; 518 K)
Solubility in water	1070 g/l

Hazards
- GHS labelling
Pictograms	(GHS02: Flammable) (GHS06: Toxic) (GHS07: Exclamation mark) (GHS08: Health hazard) (GHS09: Environmental hazard)
Signal word	Danger
Hazard statements	H301, H311, H317, H318, H331, H341, H351, H372, H400
Precautionary statements	P203, P260, P264, P264+P265, P270, P271, P272, P273, P280, P281, P301+P316, P302+P352, P304+P340, P305+P354+P338, P316, P317, P318, P319, P321, P330, P333+P313, P361+P364, P362+P364, P391, P403+P233, P405, P501
NFPA 704 (fire diamond)	3 1 0
- Except where otherwise noted, data are given for materials in their standard state (at 25 °C [77 °F], 100 kPa). Infobox references

Anilinium chloride is the organic compound with the formula C_{6}H_{5}NH^{+}_{3}Cl^{−}. It is a white solid and the chloride salt of anilinium, which is the conjugate acid of aniline, C_{6}H_{5}NH_{2}. Anilinium chloride is produced by treatment of aniline with hydrochloric acid. The cation consists of a phenyl ring attached to a tetrahedral ammonium center. The C-N bond elongates from 1.41 Å in aniline to 1.474 Å in anilinium.

== Uses ==
Anilinium chloride is used as a precursor to diphenylamine by heating with aniline:

C_{6}H_{5}NH_{2} + C_{6}H_{5}NH_{3}Cl → (C_{6}H_{5})_{2}NH + NH_{3} + HCl

It reacts with formaldehyde to give methylenedianiline, a precursor to commercial polymers.
