= Indeno(1,2,3-cd)pyrene =

Polycyclic aromatic hydrocarbon

Indeno[1,2,3-cd]pyrene

Names
- Other names: o-Phenylenepyrene; 1,10-(o-Phenylene)pyrene

Identifiers
CAS Number	193-39-5
3D model (JSmol)	Interactive image
ChEBI	CHEBI:82335
ChEMBL	ChEMBL3561582
ChemSpider	8777
ECHA InfoCard	100.005.359
EC Number	205-893-2
KEGG	C19251
PubChem CID	9131
RTECS number	NK9300000
UNII	T4SWX8I0U2
UN number	3077
CompTox Dashboard (EPA)	8024153
- InChI: InChI=1S/C22H12/c1-2-7-17-16(6-1)18-11-10-14-9-8-13-4-3-5-15-12-19(17)22(18)21(14)20(13)15/h1-12H Key: SXQBHARYMNFBPS-UHFFFAOYSA-N
- SMILES: C1=CC=C2C(=C1)C3=C4C2=CC5=CC=CC6=C5C4=C(C=C6)C=C3

Properties
Chemical formula	C_{22}H_{12}
Molar mass	276.338 g·mol^{−1}
Appearance	Yellow crystals
Melting point	164 °C (327 °F; 437 K)
Boiling point	536 °C (997 °F; 809 K)
- Except where otherwise noted, data are given for materials in their standard state (at 25 °C [77 °F], 100 kPa). Infobox references

Indeno[1,2,3-cd]pyrene is a polycyclic aromatic hydrocarbon (PAH), one of 16 PAHs generally measured in studies of environmental exposure and air pollution. Many compounds of this class are formed when burning coal, oil, gas, wood, household waste and tobacco, and can bind to or form small particles in the air. The compounds are known to have toxic, mutagenic and/or carcinogenic properties. Over 100 different PAHs have been identified in environmental samples, including indeno[1,2,3-cd]pyrene (IP). In 1962, the National Cancer Institute reported that indeno[1,2,3-cd]pyrene has a slight tumor activity. This was confirmed in 1973 by the IARC in mice testing.

== Production ==
In nature, IP is formed when burning coal, oil, gas, wood, household waste and tobacco. There are various pathways in which nature can produce PAHs, but the most important mechanism to form such compounds is based on hydrogen abstraction-acetylene addition (HACA). This is accepted as the major reaction route to form PAHs in combustion flames.

When producing IP in the lab, there are two efficient synthetic approaches. The first one is by forming a reactive diazonium intermediate out of 2-(pyren-1-yl)aniline. When this intermediate is formed, it can react with a tethered polycyclic aromatic moiety at room temperature. This is done by an intramolecular aromatic substitution. The reactivity of this reaction is controlled by the substrate concentration and its stoichiometry. tBuONO is used as a reagent (figure 1). The second way to synthesize IP is with a one-pot synthesis. With 4-bromopyrene as starting material and by adding Pd3(dba)2, P(Cy)2 and BDU in DMF, the final product will form (figure 2).

== Chemical properties ==
=== Reactions with electrophiles ===
Indeno[1,2,3-cd]pyrene can undergo reaction with bromine or fluorine to 12-bromoindeno[1,2,3-cd]pyrene and 2-fluoroindeno[1,2,3-cd]pyrene respectively.

=== Nitration ===
The reaction with indeno[1,2,3-cd]pyrene can be performed using NHO_{3} in an acetyl nitrate solution. The reaction yielded IP-NO_{2} which was regioselective, the nitrate group being added mainly to the 12 position which is the same as the Friedel-Crafts acylation and bromination

== Physical properties ==
Indeno[1,2,3-cd]pyrene (IP) is classified as a polycyclic aromatic hydrocarbon (PAH) and appears as a yellow crystal. It contains five benzene rings and one cyclopentane, resulting in a planar molecule. There is no stereochemistry present in IP, but there are resonance structures due to benzene’s conjugated pi electrons. They can move freely within the cycling rings, providing stabilization energy.

== Ecological effect ==
Studies have been conducted to investigate the ecological effects of several PAHs, including indeno[1,2,3-cd]pyrene (IP). The International Agency for Research on Cancer (IARC) published results claiming that the compound is carcinogenic in several experimental animals. Another research group studied phototoxic effects of IP and they found effects only at very high levels in a cell line of the rainbow trout. Since these levels can never be reached in water for indeno[1,2,3-cd]pyrene, even when it is maximally dissolved, it would not have implications for aquatic animals. IP is only minimally water soluble due to its lipophilic, and thus hydrophobic, character. Lipophilicity is generally inversely proportional to ecotoxicity because compounds with low water solubility (hyrdophobic) are less bioavailable to organisms, as they tend to be bound to organic particulates that reside in sediments in aquatic and marine systems. Low solubility therefore not only decreases phototoxicity but also a large part of toxicity in general. Swedish researchers have also conducted research into the PAH levels in sewage treatment plants in Sweden. They induced EROD activity, which is a measure for toxicity, by incubating chicken embryo liver cells with PAH extracts from the sludge. Indeno[1,2,3-cd]pyrene, which was one of the PAHs investigated, contributed together with 5 other selected PAHs only a minor part of the EROD activity. Therefore, though indeno[1,2,3-cd]pyrene may induce some toxicity in chicken embryo liver, its contribution is likely to be minor.

== Mechanism ==
Indeno[1,2,3-cd]pyrene are among the PAHs considered as possible carcinogens to humans. The PAH family consists of similar molecules and therefore they have a similar mechanism of causing cancer in vivo. The molecule is metabolized in the body by the cytochrome P450 system, resulting in metabolites containing nitro, quinone or hydroxyl groups. This is in line with metabolites formed from other PAHs. The nitro and quinone containing compound turned out to be cytotoxic or carcinogenic, while the hydroxyl containing metabolite did not show any toxicity or carcinogenicity. PAHs including indeno[1,2,3-cd]pyrene may be genotoxic. When PAHs are hydrolyzed, very reactive epoxide groups can be created at certain regions in the molecule. These groups can ultimately form an adduct with the base of a nucleotide in the DNA. DNA adducts with PAHs can disrupt the DNA replication or modify the DNA, by removing bases like adenine and guanine from the nucleotides. This can in the end lead to cell death and the production of truncated or misfolded proteins.
