= 4-Chloro-o-toluidine =

Names
- Preferred IUPAC name 4-Chloro-2-methylaniline
- Other names 2-Amino-5-chlorotoluene; 2-Methyl-4-chloroaniline; 4-Chloro-2-toluidine; 5-Chloro-2-aminotoluene; para-Chloro-ortho-toluidine; p-Chloro-o-toluidine

Identifiers
CAS Number	95-69-2
3D model (JSmol)	Interactive image
Abbreviations	4-COT
ChemSpider	6981
ECHA InfoCard	100.002.220
PubChem CID	7251
UNII	95NB978426
CompTox Dashboard (EPA)	DTXSID1041508
- InChI: InChI=1S/C7H8ClN/c1-5-4-6(8)2-3-7(5)9/h2-4H,9H2,1H3 Key: CXNVOWPRHWWCQR-UHFFFAOYSA-N; InChI=1/C7H8ClN/c1-5-4-6(8)2-3-7(5)9/h2-4H,9H2,1H3 Key: CXNVOWPRHWWCQR-UHFFFAOYAG
- SMILES: Clc1cc(c(N)cc1)C

Properties
Chemical formula	C_{7}H_{8}ClN
Molar mass	141.60 g·mol^{−1}
Density	1,14 g/cm^{3}
Melting point	29–30 °C
Boiling point	240–241 °C
- Except where otherwise noted, data are given for materials in their standard state (at 25 °C [77 °F], 100 kPa). Infobox references

4-Chloro-o-toluidine (4-COT, 4-chloro-2-methylaniline) is the organic compound with the formula CH_{3}C_{6}H_{3}Cl(NH_{2}). It is a colorless solid. The compound is produced as an intermediate to the pesticide chlordimeform and a precursor to some azo dyes. Production has declined after it was shown to be highly carcinogenic.

== Production and use ==
It is produced by the chlorination reaction of N-acetyltoluidine followed by deprotection and separation from the 6-chloro isomer. Production of 4-chloro-o-toluidine began in Germany in 1924. In Switzerland, 4-COT and its salts were produced between 1956 and 1976. Production and distribution ceased in 1979 in the US and in 1986 in Germany.

In nature, 4-COT is found in plants and animals as a metabolic product of chlordimeform.

== Experimental carcinogenicity and toxic effects ==
In chronic feeding studies (mice of both sexes), 4-COT induces hemangiosarcomas and hemangioendotheliomas.

4-COT becomes covalently bound to DNA of rats and mice livers.

Inhalation or skin contact with 4-COT produces acute toxic effects, initially appearing as macroscopic or microscopic haematuria. Further symptoms include dysuria, reduced bladder capacity and pain the lower abdomen. Haemorrhagic cystitis is the main symptom of acute toxicity, with methaemoglobinaemia was observed in 50% of poisoning cases.

== Epidemiological studies of cancer ==
No urinary bladder cancer was found in two of the earlier epidemiological reports of workers exposed to 4-COT in Switzerland and in the US.

Stasik et al. obtained similar results in their previous mortality study carried out on a cohort of 335 male employees exposed to 4-COT at plants in Frankfurt.

A subcohort of 116 subjects in the 4-COT cohort, engaged in the synthesis of 4-COT at the old production plant with presumably higher level of exposure to this monocyclic arylamine, was separated from the Frankfurt cohort of 335 men, for further research.

Stasik then conducted a retrospective study of the incidence of bladder cancer among workers restricted to this subcohort. His investigation revealed eight subjects in whom bladder carcinomas were diagnosed between 1967 and 1985. Two of them had already died. The standardized incidence rate for bladder carcinomas in the 4-COT subcohort was 73 times higher than expected.

Histologically, all tumor cases were urothelial carcinomas.

== Evaluation of carcinogenic risk to man ==
The Deutsche Forschungsgemeinschaft (German Research Council) defined 4-COT as a human carcinogen (III A1). Besides Germany, 4-COT is listed as a carcinogen in Finland and Switzerland.

Further in 1990 the International Agency for Research on Cancer (IARC) classified 4-COT as a probable human carcinogen (2A).

Both assessments were based on the results of the subcohort incidence study.

== Further studies of cancer ==
Also in China an increased incidence of bladder cancer among farm workers exposed to chlordimeform has been reported in 1990.

In 1992 Popp, Norpoth et al. found seven persons suffering from bladder cancer among 49 workers involved in the synthesis of chlordimeform from 4-COT in another German plant.

Ten years later Stasik carried out a follow-up study of the same 4-COT subcohort studied by him previously. His re-investigations revealed a cluster of four new cases of bladder tumors in this group. So the total evidence of bladder cancer in the 4-COT subcohort increased to 12 cases, which makes 10% of all members of this particular group.
