= Benz(a)anthracene =

Chemical compound

Benz[a]anthracene
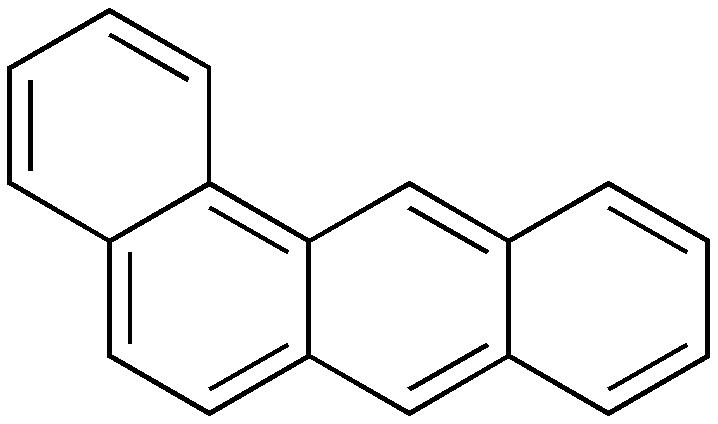

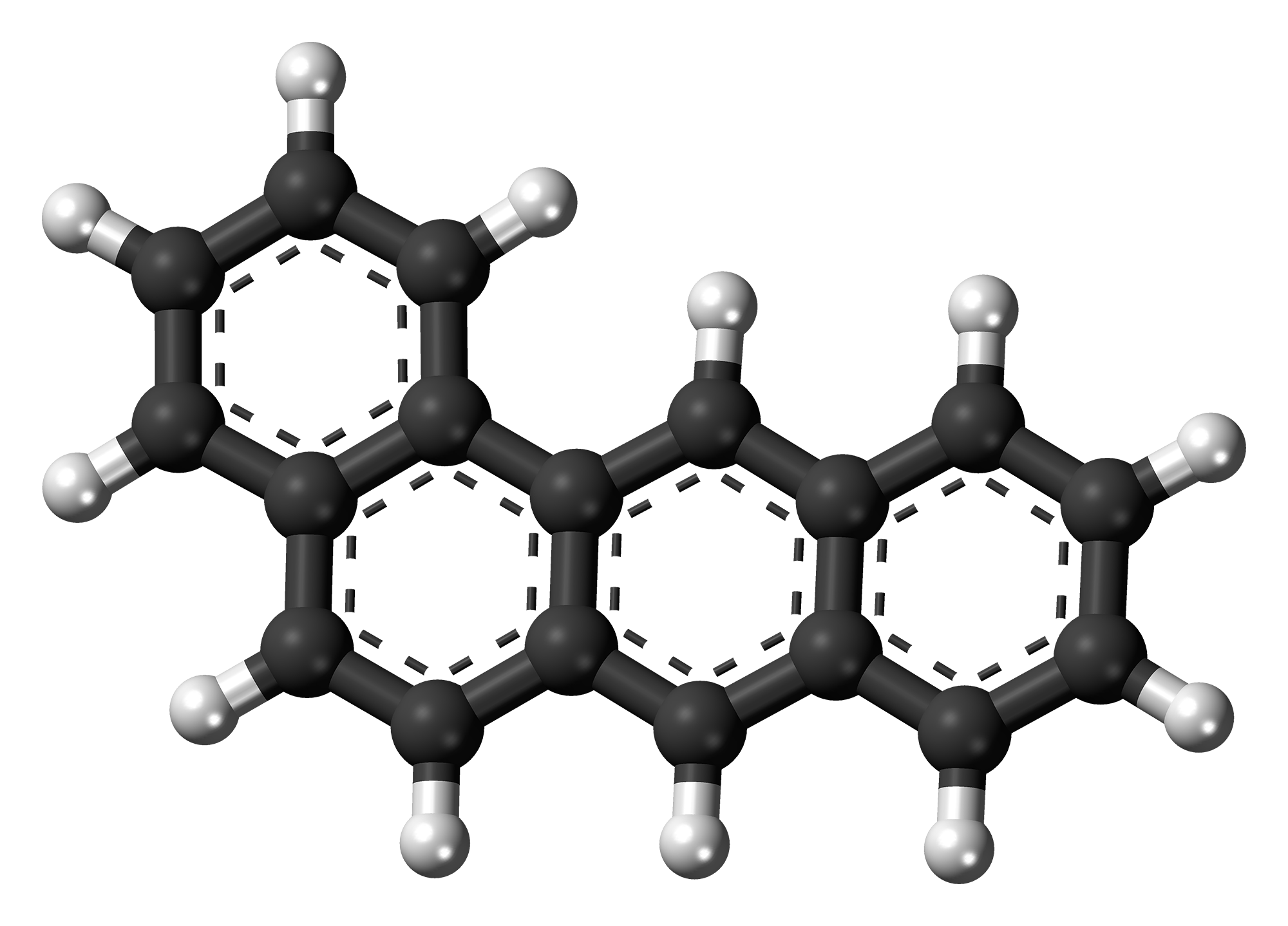

Names
- Preferred IUPAC name Tetraphene
- Other names Benz[a]anthracene; Benzanthracene; Benzanthrene; 1,2-Benzanthracene; Benzo[b]phenanthrene; Tetracyclo[8.8.0.0^{2,7}.0^{12,17}]octadeca-1,3,5,7,9,11,13,15,17-nonaene

Identifiers
CAS Number	56-55-3
3D model (JSmol)	Interactive image
ChEBI	CHEBI:51348
ChemSpider	5739
ECHA InfoCard	100.000.255
KEGG	C14317
PubChem CID	5954
UNII	C5PLF6152K
CompTox Dashboard (EPA)	DTXSID5023902
- InChI: InChI=1S/C18H12/c1-2-7-15-12-18-16(11-14(15)6-1)10-9-13-5-3-4-8-17(13)18/h1-12H Key: DXBHBZVCASKNBY-UHFFFAOYSA-N; InChI=1/C18H12/c1-2-7-15-12-18-16(11-14(15)6-1)10-9-13-5-3-4-8-17(13)18/h1-12H Key: DXBHBZVCASKNBY-UHFFFAOYAM
- SMILES: c1ccc2c(c1)ccc3c2cc4ccccc4c3

Properties
Chemical formula	C_{18}H_{12}
Molar mass	228.294 g·mol^{−1}
Appearance	White solid
Density	1.19 g/cm^{3}
Melting point	158 °C (316 °F; 431 K)
Boiling point	438 °C (820 °F; 711 K)

Hazards
Flash point	209.1 °C (408.4 °F; 482.2 K)
- Except where otherwise noted, data are given for materials in their standard state (at 25 °C [77 °F], 100 kPa). verify (what is ?) Infobox references

A sample of 1,2-Benzanthracene

Benz[a]anthracene or benzo[a]anthracene is a polycyclic aromatic hydrocarbon with the chemical formula C_{18}H_{12}. It is produced during incomplete combustion of organic matter.

Benz[a]anthracene is one of carcinogenic constituents of tobacco smoke.

== See also ==
- Tetracene, also known as benz[b]anthracene
