= 1-Nitropyrene =

Names
- Preferred IUPAC name 1-Nitropyrene

Identifiers
CAS Number	5522-43-0
3D model (JSmol)	Interactive image
ChEBI	CHEBI:34107
ChEMBL	ChEMBL167395
ChemSpider	20390
ECHA InfoCard	100.024.426
PubChem CID	21694
UNII	TD1665I8Q4
CompTox Dashboard (EPA)	DTXSID6020983
- InChI: InChI=1S/C16H9NO2/c18-17(19)14-9-7-12-5-4-10-2-1-3-11-6-8-13(14)16(12)15(10)11/h1-9H Key: ALRLPDGCPYIVHP-UHFFFAOYSA-N
- SMILES: [O-][N+](=O)c4ccc2ccc1cccc3c1c2c4cc3

Properties
Chemical formula	C_{16}H_{9}NO_{2}
Molar mass	247.253 g·mol^{−1}
Density	1.422 g/mL
- Except where otherwise noted, data are given for materials in their standard state (at 25 °C [77 °F], 100 kPa). verify (what is ?) Infobox references

1-Nitropyrene is a by-product of combustion and is the predominant nitrated polycyclic aromatic hydrocarbon (pyrene) emitted in a diesel engine. 1-Nitropyrene is listed as an IARC Group 2B carcinogen, indicating it is possibly carcinogenic to humans.
