= Dibenzopyrenes =

dibenzo[a,e]pyrene
dibenzo[a,h]pyrene
dibenzo[a,i]pyrene
dibenzo[a,l]pyrene
dibenzo[e,l]pyrene

Identifiers
CAS Number	192-65-4 [a,e]; 189-64-0 [a,h]; 189-55-9 [a,i]; 191-30-0 [a,l]; 192-51-8 [e,l]
3D model (JSmol)	[a,e]: Interactive image; [a,h]: Interactive image; [a,i]: Interactive image; [a,l]: Interactive image; [e,l]: Interactive image
ChEBI	CHEBI:82442 [a,e]; CHEBI:82313 [a,h]; CHEBI:82314 [a,i]; CHEBI:35861 [a,l]; CHEBI:82443 [e,l]
ChemSpider	8772 [a,e]; 8754 [a,h]; 8752 [a,i]; 8765 [a,l]; 8768 [e,l]
PubChem CID	9126 [a,e]; 9108 [a,h]; 9106 [a,i]; 9119 [a,l]; 9122 [e,l]
UNII	SAC8PEK62H [a,e]; XR5R3V8BJK [a,h]; 7FMI112D18 [a,i]; G3X629VE4A [a,l]; R1OAU0KNG7 [e,l]
- InChI: [a,e]: InChI=1S/C24H14/c1-2-8-17-16(6-1)14-22-19-10-4-3-9-18(19)20-11-5-7-15-12-13-21(17)24(22)23(15)20/h1-14H Key: KGHMWBNEMFNJFZ-UHFFFAOYSA-N; [a,h]: InChI=1S/C24H14/c1-3-7-19-15(5-1)13-17-9-12-22-20-8-4-2-6-16(20)14-18-10-11-21(19)23(17)24(18)22/h1-14H Key: RXUSYFJGDZFVND-UHFFFAOYSA-N; [a,i]: InChI=1S/C24H14/c1-3-7-19-15(5-1)13-17-9-10-18-14-16-6-2-4-8-20(16)22-12-11-21(19)23(17)24(18)22/h1-14H Key: TUGYIJVAYAHHHM-UHFFFAOYSA-N; [a,l]: InChI=1S/C24H14/c1-2-8-18-16(6-1)14-17-13-12-15-7-5-11-20-19-9-3-4-10-21(19)24(18)23(17)22(15)20/h1-14H Key: JNTHRSHGARDABO-UHFFFAOYSA-N; [e,l]: InChI=1S/C24H14/c1-2-8-16-15(7-1)19-11-5-13-21-17-9-3-4-10-18(17)22-14-6-12-20(16)24(22)23(19)21/h1-14H Key: BMIAHKYKCHRGBA-UHFFFAOYSA-N
- SMILES: [a,e]: c1ccc2c(c1)cc3c4ccccc4c5cccc6c5c3c2cc6; [a,h]: c1ccc2c(c1)cc3ccc4c5ccccc5cc6c4c3c2cc6; [a,i]: c1ccc2c(c1)cc3ccc4cc5ccccc5c6c4c3c2cc6; [a,l]: c1ccc2c(c1)cc3ccc4cccc5c4c3c2c6c5cccc6; [e,l]: c1ccc2c(c1)c3cccc4c3c5c2cccc5c6c4cccc6

Properties
Chemical formula	C_{24}H_{14}
Molar mass	302.376 g·mol^{−1}
- Except where otherwise noted, data are given for materials in their standard state (at 25 °C [77 °F], 100 kPa). Infobox references

Dibenzopyrenes are a group of high molecular weight polycyclic aromatic hydrocarbons with the molecular formula C_{24}H_{14}. There are five isomers of dibenzopyrene which differ by the arrangement of aromatic rings: dibenzo[a,e]pyrene, dibenzo[a,h]pyrene, dibenzo[a,i]pyrene, dibenzo[a,l]pyrene, and dibenzo[e,l]pyrene.

Dibenzopyrenes have been recognized for their suspected human carcinogenicity. The most notable dibenzopyrene isomer, dibenzo[a,l]pyrene is a constituent of tobacco smoke and is thought to be 30 to 100 times more potent as a carcinogen than benzo[a]pyrene. The four dibenzopyrene isomers; dibenzo[a,e]pyrene, dibenzo[a,h]pyrene, dibenzo[a,i]pyrene, dibenzo[a,l]pyrene are included in the list of 16 EU priority polycyclic aromatic hydrocarbons due to their mutagenicity and suspected human carcinogenicity.

Primary sources of dibenzopyrenes in the environment are combustion of wood and coal, gasoline and diesel exhaust, and tires.
