= C7H9NO =

The molecular formula C_{7}H_{9}NO may refer to:

- 4-Amino-m-cresol
- Anisidines
  - o-Anisidine (2-methoxyaniline)
  - m-Anisidine (3-methoxyaniline)
  - p-Anisidine (4-methoxyaniline)
