= Meat floss =

Dried meat product from China

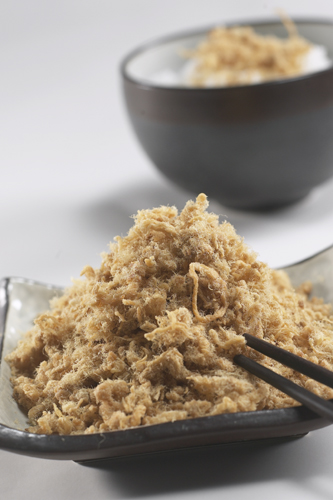
- A dish of meat floss made from pork, served with rice
- Alternative names: Meat wool, pork floss, flossy pork, meat cotton candy or pork sung
- Place of origin: China
- Region or state: East Asia and Southeast Asia
- Associated cuisine: Cambodian, Chinese, Indonesian, Malaysian, Singaporean, Taiwanese, Thai and Vietnamese
- Main ingredients: lean meat

Meat floss

Chinese name
- Traditional Chinese: 肉鬆
- Simplified Chinese: 肉松
- Literal meaning: meat fluff, meat flakes
Transcriptions
Standard Mandarin
- Hanyu Pinyin: ròusōng
- IPA: [ɻôʊsʊ́ŋ]
Wu
- Romanization: [ɲiɔʔ soŋ]
Yue: Cantonese
- Yale Romanization: yuhk-sūng
- Jyutping: juk6 sung1

Southern Min name
- Chinese: 肉拊
- Literal meaning: processed meat; rubbed / broken-down meat
Transcriptions
Southern Min
- Hokkien POJ: bah-hú
- Tâi-lô: bah-hú

Southern Min name (Tainan)
- Chinese: 肉酥
- Literal meaning: meat flakes, meat crisps
Transcriptions
Southern Min
- Hokkien POJ: bah-so͘
- Tâi-lô: bah-soo

Eastern Min name
- Traditional Chinese: 肉絨
- Simplified Chinese: 肉绒
- Literal meaning: (fine) meat wool, fine meat floss (embroidery silk); meat down feathers (or fine hair); meat velvet, fine meat fabric
Transcriptions
Eastern Min
- Fuzhou BUC: nṳ̆k-ṳ̀ng

Hakka name
- Chinese: 肉麩
- Literal meaning: meat wheat bran; meat gluten
Transcriptions
Hakka
- Romanization: ngiug fu

Vietnamese name
- Vietnamese: ruốc (Northern Vietnamese) chà bông (Southern Vietnamese)

Thai name
- Thai: หมูหย็อง
- RTGS: mu yong

Malay name
- Malay: serondeng

Indonesian name
- Indonesian: abon

Filipino name
- Tagalog: mahu or masang

Khmer name
- Khmer: សាច់ជ្រូកផាត់ sach chruok phat

Meat floss, also known as yuk sung or rousong (Chinese: 肉鬆; pinyin: ròusōng; Jyutping: juk6 sung1; Pe̍h-ōe-jī: bah-so͘; Mandarin Chinese: [ɻôʊsʊ́ŋ]), is a dried meat product of Chinese origin, with a light and fluffy texture similar to coarse cotton. It is more commonly known as bak hu (Hokkien: 肉拊, Pe̍h-ōe-jī: bah-hú) in Hokkien-influenced regions, such as Southeast Asia and Taiwan. Meat floss is golden in color with a distinctive flavor and sweet taste that is somewhat comparable to beef jerky.

== Production and styles ==
Meat floss is made by stewing lean meat finely cut along the grain in a broth until the meat is very tender and individual muscle fibers can be teased apart. This happens when the water-insoluble collagen that holds the muscle fibers of the meat together has been converted into water-soluble gelatin. The meat is then separated from the broth and shredded into fibrous strips. It is then added back into the broth which is enriched with soy sauce, sugar, fennel, ginger, rice wine or other ingredients. The mixture is then cooked at low heat and stirred continuously until the floss is dried.

There are different regional styles of meat floss, which differ in whether oil is added during the last process of production. Jiangsu style rousong is dry-cooked and the product is slightly chewy, while Fujian style bak hu is fried with oil and the product is mildly crispy. Five kilograms (11 lb) of meat will usually yield about one kilogram (2.2 lb) of floss.

Taiwanese pork floss is made by cutting pork along the muscle fibers then boiling it for around 80 minutes to reduce moisture and soften collagen. The meat is then pressed into a paddle to loosen fibers, then transferred to a gas-fired frypan with mechanical scrapers to aid in drying and reducing the meat into long fibers. Sucrose, dehydrated starch and salt is then added at a specific time and ratio to enhance flavor and texture without hindering moisture removal. Once the desired consistency and dryness is obtained, the floss is stored briefly at room temperature and reheated in the scraping-frypan.

== Variations ==
Fish can also be made into floss (魚鬆; yú sōng), though initial stewing is not required due to the low collagen and elastin content of fish meat. Rabbit and duck floss can also be found in China.

In Muslim-majority Indonesia and Malaysia, beef or chicken floss is the most popular variant, commonly called abon in Indonesian and serunding (also spelled serondeng) in Malay. In Malaysia, serunding is often served during Ramadan and Eid.

In Nigeria, beef, goat or other meats are processed into a similar meat floss called dambu nama.

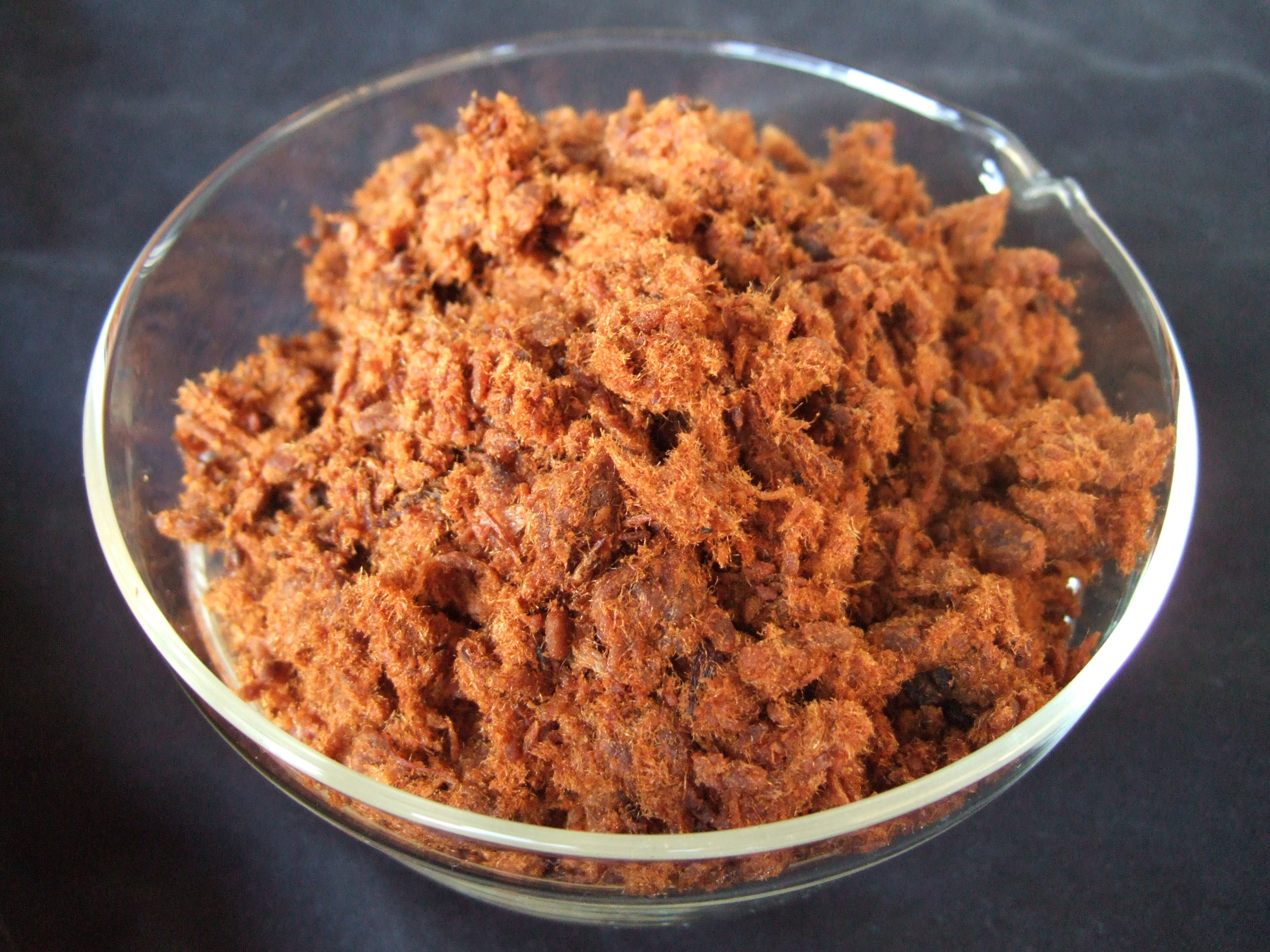
A bowl of beef floss

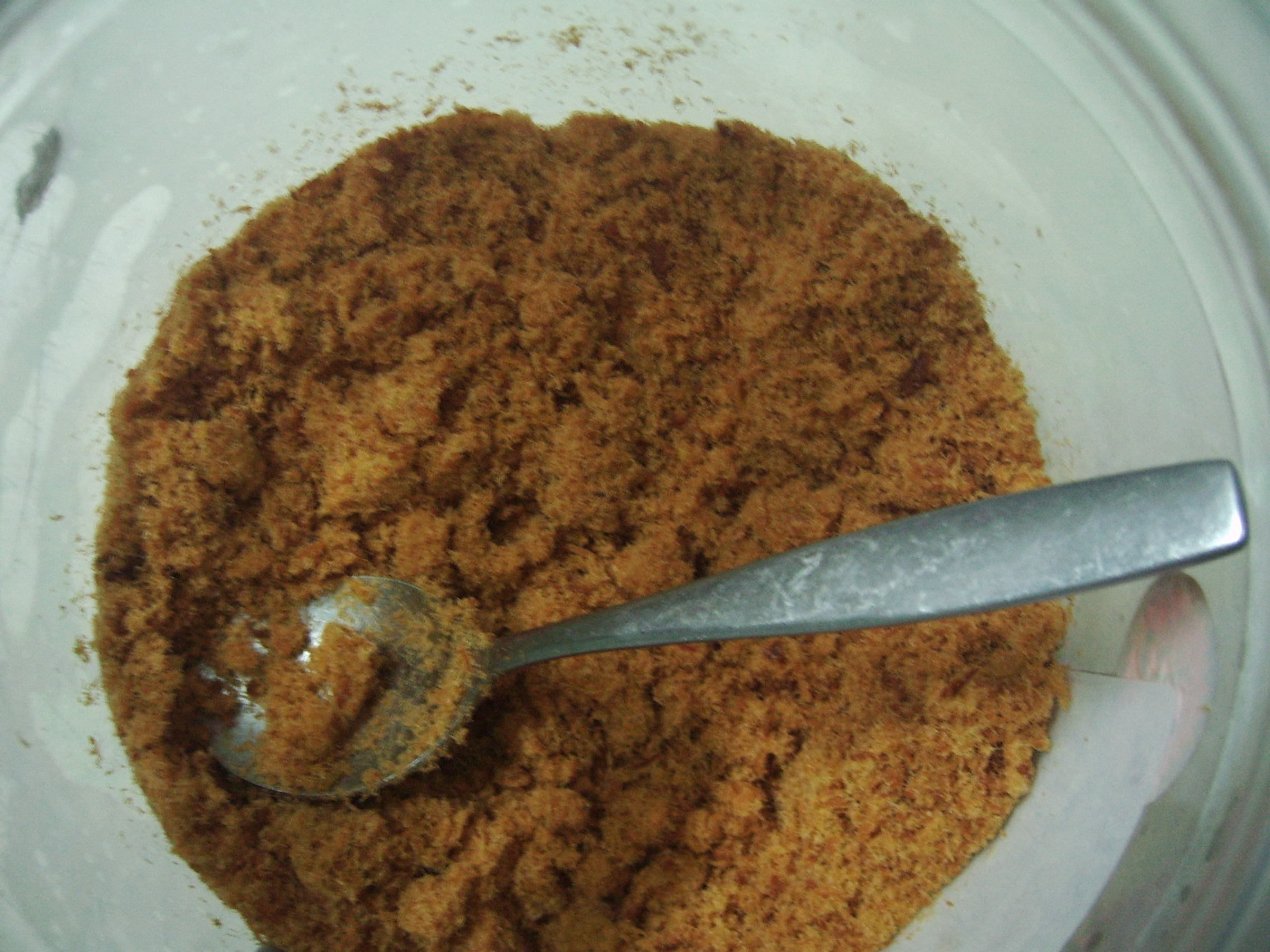
Fish floss is roasted to look similar to yuk sung.

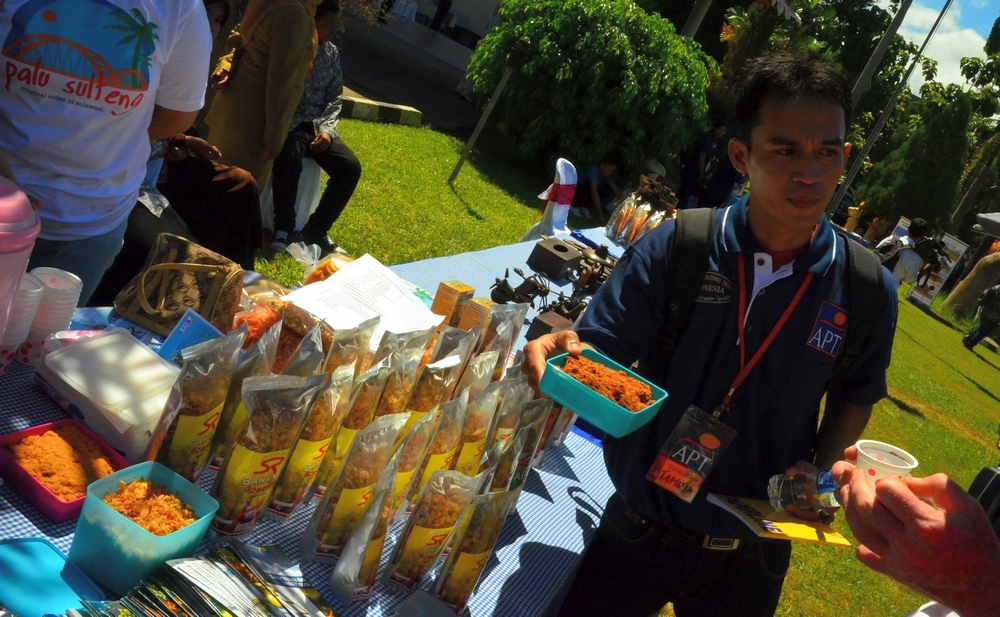
Beef floss vendor in Sulawesi, Indonesia

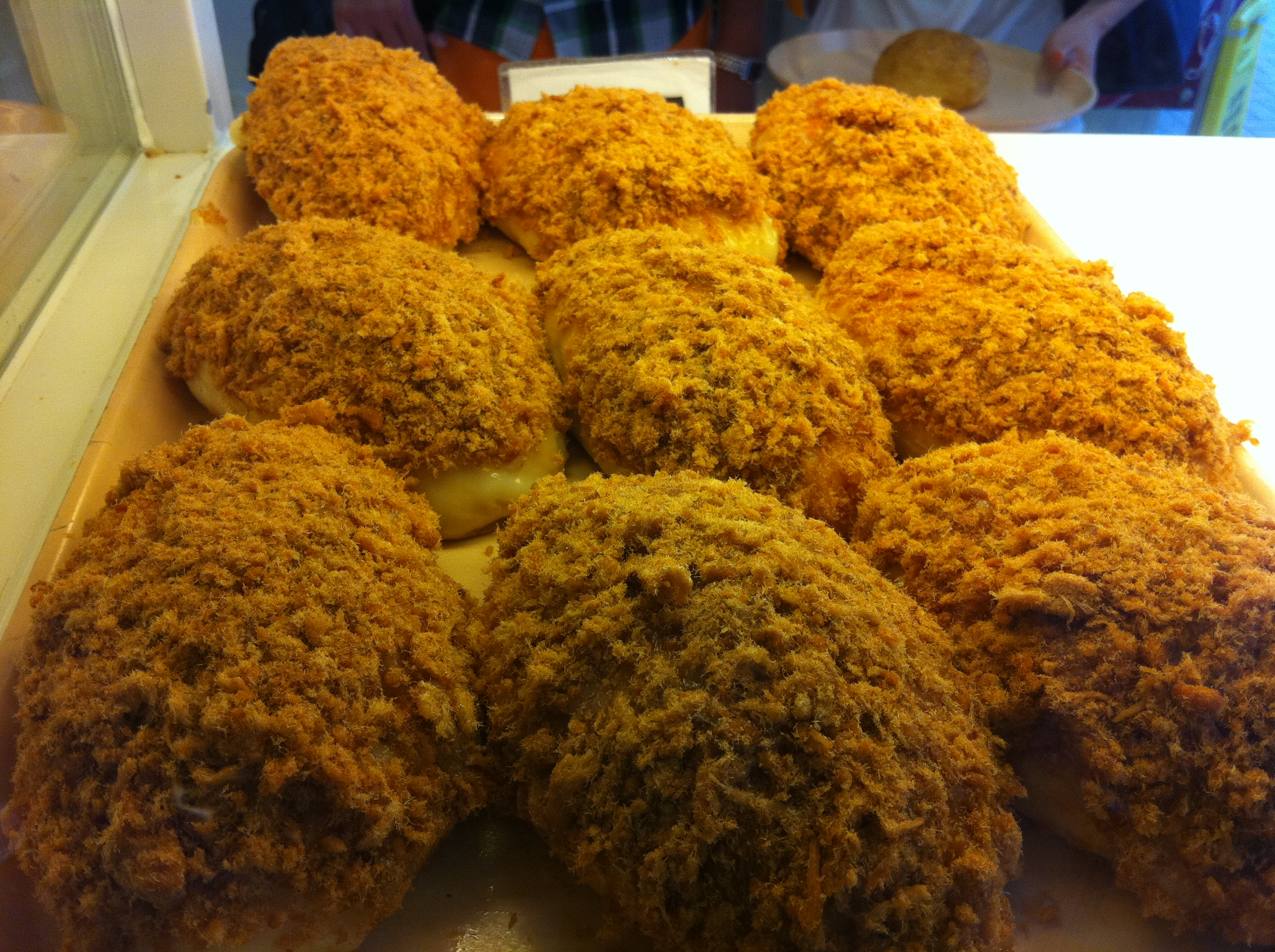
Meat floss buns from Hong Kong

== Health effects ==
A study has demonstrated a positive correlation between increased processing temperatures of meat floss and increased formation of heterocyclic aromatic amines (HAAs) within the meat. Up to seven different HAAs were found when meat floss was processed at 150 °C (302 °F). HAAs are formed in meats that are cooked to the "well done" stage, and are believed to promote the development of some cancers.

== See also ==
- Dambu nama – Spiced shredded meat floss from Northern Nigeria
- Bakkwa – Salty-sweet dried meat product
- Čvarci – Southeastern European pork rind
- Dried shredded squid – Seafood product
- Katsuobushi – Dried, fermented, and smoked skipjack tuna
- Machaca – Mexican dried meat
- Pemmican – Food mix with long shelf life, sometimes used as survival food
- Pulled pork – Pork barbecue dish of the Southern United States
- Rillette – Meat preservation method
- Serundeng – Indonesian spiced grated coconut
