= IARC group 2B =

Classification of agents that are possibly carcinogenic to humans

IARC group 2B substances, mixtures and exposure circumstances are those that have been classified as "possibly carcinogenic to humans" by the International Agency for Research on Cancer (IARC). This category is used when there is limited evidence of carcinogenicity in humans and less than sufficient evidence of carcinogenicity in experimental animals. It may also be used when there is insufficient evidence of carcinogenicity in humans but sufficient evidence in experimental animals. In some cases, an agent, mixture, or exposure circumstance with inadequate evidence of carcinogenicity in humans but limited evidence in experimental animals, combined with supporting evidence from other relevant data, may be included in this group.

This list focuses on the hazard linked to the agents. This means that the carcinogenic agents are capable of causing cancer, but this does not take their risk into account, which is the probability of causing a cancer given the level of exposure to this carcinogenic agent. The list is up to date as of January 2024.

== Agents and groups of agents ==
=== A ===
- A-α-C (2-Amino-9H-pyrido[2,3-b]indole)
- Acetaldehyde
- Acetamide
- AF-2 (2-(2-Furyl)-3-(5-nitro-2-furyl)acrylamide)
- Aflatoxin M1
- 1-Amino-2,4-dibromoanthraquinone
- 2-Amino-4-chlorophenol
- para-Aminoazobenzene
- ortho-Aminoazotoluene
- 2-Amino-5-(5-nitro-2-furyl)-1,3,4-thiadiazole
- Amsacrine
- Anthracene
- Arecoline
- Aspartame

=== B ===
- Benz[j]aceanthrylene
- Benz[a]anthracene
- Benzo[b]fluoranthene
- Benzo[j]fluoranthene
- Benzo[k]fluoranthene
- Benzo[c]phenanthrene
- Benzophenone
- Benzofuran
- Benzyl violet 4B
- 2,2-Bis(bromomethyl)propane-1,3-diol
- BK polyomavirus (BKV)
- Bleomycin
- Bracken fern
- 1-Bromo-3-chloropropane
- Bromochloroacetic acid
- Bromodichloromethane
- 1-Bromopropane
- 1-Butyl glycidyl ether
- Butyl methacrylate
- Butylated hydroxyanisole
- β-Butyrolactone

=== C ===
- Caffeic acid
- Carbazole
- Carbon black
- Carbon nanotubes, multi-walled MWCNT-7
- Carbon tetrachloride
- Catechol
- Chlordane
- Chlordecone (Kepone)
- Chlorendic acid
- para-Chloroaniline
- 3-Chloro-4-(dichloromethyl)-5-hydroxy-2(5H)-furanone
- Chloroform
- 1-Chloro-2-methylpropene
- 3-Chloro-2-methylpropene, technical grade
- 4-Chlorobenzotrifluoride
- 2-Chloronitrobenzene
- 4-Chloronitrobenzene
- Chlorophenoxy herbicides
- 4-Chloro-ortho-phenylenediamine
- Chloroprene
- Chlorothalonil
- Chrysene
- CI Acid Red 114
- CI Basic Red 9
- CI Direct Blue 15
- CI DIrect Blue 218
- Citrus Red No. 2
- Cobalt(II) oxide
- Cobalt and cobalt compounds ^{1}
- Cobalt sulfate and other soluble cobalt(II) salts
- Coconut oil diethanolamine condensate
- para-Cresidine
- Crotonaldehyde
- Cumene
- Cupferron
- Cycasin

=== D ===
- Dacarbazine
- Dantron (Chrysazin, 1,8-Dihydroxyanthraquinone)
- Daunomycin
- DDT (p,p'-DDT)
- N,N'-Diacetylbenzidine
- 2,4-Diaminoanisole
- 4,4'-Diaminodiphenyl ether
- 2,4-Diaminotoluene
- Dibenz[a,h]acridine
- Dibenz[c,h]acridine
- 7H-Dibenzo[c,g]carbazole
- Dibenzo[a,h]pyrene
- Dibenzo[a,i]pyrene
- Dibromoacetic acid
- Dibromoacetonitrile
- 1,2-Dibromo-3-chloropropane
- 2,3-Dibromopropan-1-ol
- 1,4-Dichloro-2-nitrobenzene
- Dichloroacetic acid
- para-Dichlorobenzene
- 3,3'-Dichlorobenzidine
- 3,3'-Dichloro-4,4'-diaminodiphenyl ether
- 1,2-Dichloroethane
- 2,4-D (2,4-dichlorophenoxyacetic acid)
- 1,3-Dichloropropene (technical grade)
- 1,3-Dichloro-2-propanol
- Dichlorvos
- Diethanolamine
- Di(2-ethylhexyl)phthalate
- 1,2-Diethylhydrazine
- Diglycidyl resorcinol ether
- Digoxin
- Dihydrosafrole
- Diisopropyl sulfate
- 3,3'-Dimethoxybenzidine (o-Dianisidine)
- N,N-Dimethylacetamide
- para-Dimethylaminoazobenzene
- trans-2-[(Dimethylamino)methylimino]-5-[2-(5-nitro-2-furyl)-vinyl]-1,3,4-oxadiazole
- 2,6-Xylidine (2,6-Dimethylaniline)
- Dimethylarsinic acid
- 3,3'-Dimethylbenzidine (o-Tolidine)
- 1,1-Dimethylhydrazine
- Dimethyl hydrogen phosphite
- Dimethyl-p-toluidine
- 3,7-Dinitrofluoranthene
- 3,9-Dinitrofluoranthene
- 1,3-Dinitropyrene
- 1,6-Dinitropyrene
- 1,8-Dinitropyrene
- 2,4-Dinitrotoluene
- 2,6-Dinitrotoluene
- 1,4-Dioxane
- 1,2-Diphenylhydrazine
- Diphenylamine
- Disperse Blue 1
- 4-Dimethylaminoazobenzene,Solvent yellow 2( MSDS India )

=== E ===
- 1,2-Epoxybutane
- Ethyl acrylate
- Ethylbenzene
- Ethylene dichloride
- 2-Ethylhexyl acrylate
- Ethyl methanesulfonate

=== F ===
- Foreign bodies, implanted in tissues

Polymeric, prepared as thin smooth films (with the exception of poly(glycolic acid))
Metallic, prepared as thin smooth films
Metallic cobalt, metallic nickel and an alloy powder containing 66-67% nickel, 13-16% chromium and 7% iron

- 2-(2-Formylhydrazino)-4-(5-nitro-2-furyl)thiazole
- Fumonisin B1
- Furan

=== G ===
- Gentian violet
- Ginkgo biloba extract
- Glu-P-1 (2-Amino-6-methyldipyrido[1,2-a:3',2'-d]imidazole)
- Glu-P-2 (2-Aminodipyrido[1,2-a:3',2'-d]imidazole)
- Glycidaldehyde
- Griseofulvin

=== H ===
- HC Blue No. 1
- Heptachlor
- Hexachlorobenzene
- Hexachloroethane
- Hexachlorocyclohexanes
- Hexamethylphosphoramide (HMPA)
- 2,4-Hexadienal
- Human immunodeficiency virus type 2 (infection with)
- Human papillomavirus types 26, 53, 66, 67, 70, 73, 82
- Human papillomavirus types 30, 34, 69, 85, 97
- Human papillomavirus types 5 and 8 (in patients with epidermodysplasia verruciformis)
- Hydrochlorothiazide
- 1-Hydroxyanthraquinone

=== I ===
- Indeno[1,2,3-cd]pyrene
- Indium tin oxide
- Iron-dextran complex
- Isoeugenol
- Isophorone
- Isoprene

=== J ===
- JC polyomavirus (JCV)

=== K ===
- Kava extract

=== L ===
- Lasiocarpine
- Lead
- Leucomalachite green

=== M ===
- Magnetic fields (extremely low frequency)
- Malachite green
- MeA-α-C (2-Amino-3-methyl-9H-pyrido[2,3-b]indole)
- Medroxyprogesterone acetate
- MeIQ (2-Amino-3,4-dimethylimidazo[4,5-f]quinoline)
- MeIQx (2-Amino-3,8-dimethylimidazo[4,5-f]quinoxaline)
- Melamine
- Merphalan
- Methyl acrylate
- Methyl isobutyl ketone
- Methylarsonic acid
- 2-Methylaziridine (Propyleneimine)
- Methylazoxymethanol acetate
- 5-Methylchrysene
- 4,4'-Methylene bis(2-methylaniline)
- 4,4'-Methylenedianiline
- Methyleugenol
- 2-Methylimidazole
- 4-Methylimidazole
- Methylmercury compounds
- N-Methylolacrylamide^{1}
- 2-Methyl-1-nitroanthraquinone (uncertain purity)
- N-Methyl-N-nitrosourethane
- Methylthiouracil
- α-Methylstyrene
- Metronidazole
- Michler's base (4,4'-methylene-bis(N,N-dimethyl)benzenamine)
- Michler's ketone (4,4'-bis(dimethylamino)benzophenone)
- Microcystin-LR
- Mirex
- Mitomycin C
- Mitoxantrone
- Molybdenum trioxide
- 3-Monochloro-1,2-propanediol (3-MCPD)
- Monocrotaline
- 5-(Morpholinomethyl)-3-[(5-nitrofurfurylidene)amino]-2-oxazolidinone
- β-Myrcene

=== N ===
- Nafenopin
- Naphthalene
- Nickel, metallic and alloys
- Niridazole
- Nitrilotriacetic acid and its salts ^{1}
- 5-Nitroacenaphthene
- 2-Nitroanisole
- para-Nitroanisole
- 3-Nitrobenzanthrone
- Nitrobenzene
- Nitrofen (technical-grade)
- 2-Nitrofluorene
- 1-[(5-Nitrofurfurylidene)amino]-2-imidazolidinone
- N-[4-(5-Nitro-2-furyl)-2-thiazolyl]acetamide
- Nitrogen mustard N-oxide
- Nitromethane
- 2-Nitropropane
- 4-Nitropyrene
- N-Nitrosodi-n-butylamine
- N-Nitrosodiethanolamine
- N-Nitrosodi-n-propylamine
- 3-(N-Nitrosomethylamino)propionitrile
- N-Nitrosomethylethylamine
- N-Nitrosomethylvinylamine
- N-Nitrosomorpholine
- N-Nitrosopiperidine
- N-Nitrosopyrrolidine
- N-Nitrososarcosine

=== O ===
- Ochratoxin A
- Oil Orange SS
- Oxazepam

=== P ===
- Palygorskite (attapulgite) (long fibres, >5 μm)
- Panfuran S (containing dihydroxymethylfuratrizine)
- Parathion
- Pentosan polysulfate sodium
- Perfluorooctanesulfonic acid (PFOS)
- Phenazopyridine hydrochloride
- Phenobarbital
- Phenolphthalein
- Phenoxybenzamine hydrochloride
- Phenyl glycidyl ether
- ortho-Phenylenediamine
- ortho-Phenylenediamine dihydrochloride
- Phenytoin
- PhIP (2-amino-1-methyl-6-phenylimidazo(4,5-b)pyridine)
- Polychlorophenols and their sodium salts (mixed exposures)
- Ponceau MX
- Ponceau 3R
- Potassium bromate
- Primidone
- Progestins
- Progestogen-only contraceptives
- β-Propiolactone
- Propylene oxide
- Propylthiouracil
- Pulegone
- Pyridine

=== Q ===
- Quinoline

=== R ===
- Radiofrequency electromagnetic fields
- Refractory ceramic fibres
- Riddelliine

=== S ===
- Safrole
- Schistosoma japonicum (infection with)
- Silicon carbide, fibrous
- Sodium ortho-phenylphenate
- Special-purpose fibres such as E-glass and '475' glass fibres
- Sterigmatocystin
- Streptozotocin
- Sulfasalazine
- Sulfallate

=== T ===
- 1,1,1,2-Tetrachloroethane
- 1,1,2,2-Tetrachloroethane
- Tetrachlorvinphos
- Tetrahydrofuran
- Tetranitromethane
- Thioacetamide
- 4,4'-Thiodianiline
- 2-Thiouracil
- Titanium dioxide
- Toluene diisocyanates
- Toxaphene (Polychlorinated camphenes)
- Triamterene
- Trichlormethine (Trimustine hydrochloride)
- Trichloroacetic acid
- 2,4,6-Trichlorophenol
- Trp-P-1 (3-Amino-1,4-dimethyl-5H-pyrido[4,3-b]indole)
- Trp-P-2 (3-Amino-1-methyl-5H-pyrido[4,3-b]indole)
- Tungsten weapons-grade (with nickel and cobalt) alloy
- Trypan blue

=== U ===
- Uracil mustard

=== V ===
- Vanadium pentoxide
- Vinyl acetate
- 4-Vinylcyclohexene
- 4-Vinylcyclohexene diepoxide

=== Z ===
- Zalcitabine
- Zidovudine (AZT)

== Mixtures ==
- Aloe vera, whole leaf extract
- Bitumens, occupational exposure to straight-run bitumens and their emissions during road paving
- Bitumens, occupational exposure to hard bitumens and their emissions during mastic asphalt work
- Carrageenan, degraded (Poligeenan)
- Chlorinated paraffins of average carbon chain length C_{12} and average degree of chlorination approximately 60%
- Diesel fuel, marine
- Engine exhaust, gasoline
- Fuel oils, residual (heavy)
- Fusarium moniliforme, toxins derived from (fumonisin B_{1}, fumonisin B_{2}, and fusarin C)
- Gasoline
- Goldenseal root powder
- Magenta dyes (CI Basic Red and fuchins)
- Pickled vegetables (traditional in Asia)
- Toxaphene (Polychlorinated camphenes)
- Welding fumes

== Exposure circumstances ==
- Carpentry and joinery
- Cobalt metal without tungsten carbide
- Dry cleaning (occupational exposures in)
- Firefighter (occupational exposure as)
- Printing processes (occupational exposures in)
- Talc-based body powder (perineal use of)
- Textile manufacturing industry (work in)

== Notes ==
- ^1 Evaluated as a group.

== See also ==
- IARC group 1
- IARC group 2A
- IARC group 3
