= 2-Amino-1-methyl-6-phenylimidazo(4,5-b)pyridine =

- PhIP

Names
- Preferred IUPAC name 1-Methyl-6-phenyl-1H-imidazo[4,5-b]pyridin-2-amine
- Other names PhIP

Identifiers
CAS Number	105650-23-5
3D model (JSmol)	Interactive image
ChEBI	CHEBI:76290
ChEMBL	ChEMBL1213271 =
ChemSpider	1476
DrugBank	DB08398
ECHA InfoCard	100.159.539
PubChem CID	1530
UNII	909C6UN66T
CompTox Dashboard (EPA)	DTXSID3037628
- InChI: InChI=1S/C13H12N4/c1-17-11-7-10(9-5-3-2-4-6-9)8-15-12(11)16-13(17)14/h2-8H,1H3,(H2,14,15,16) = Key: UQVKZNNCIHJZLS-UHFFFAOYSA-N =; InChI=1/C13H12N4/c1-17-11-7-10(9-5-3-2-4-6-9)8-15-12(11)16-13(17)14/h2-8H,1H3,(H2,14,15,16) Key: UQVKZNNCIHJZLS-UHFFFAOYAX
- SMILES: n1cc(cc2c1nc(n2C)N)c3ccccc3

Properties
Chemical formula	C_{13}H_{12}N_{4}
Molar mass	224.267 g·mol^{−1}
Appearance	Off-white solid
Density	1.3 gcm^{−3}
Melting point	300 °C (572 °F; 573 K)
Boiling point	468.9 °C (876.0 °F; 742.0 K)
Solubility in water	407.1 mg/L

Hazards
- Occupational safety and health (OHS/OSH)
Main hazards	T
- Except where otherwise noted, data are given for materials in their standard state (at 25 °C [77 °F], 100 kPa). verify (what is ?) Infobox references

2-Amino-1-methyl-6-phenylimidazo[4,5-b]pyridine (also known as PhIP) is one of the most abundant heterocyclic amines (HCAs) found in cooked meat. PhIP is formed at high temperatures from the reaction between creatine or creatinine (found in muscle meats), amino acids, and sugar. PhIP formation increases with the temperature and duration of cooking and also depends on the method of cooking and the variety of meat being cooked. The U.S. Department of Health and Human Services National Toxicology Program has declared PhIP as "reasonably anticipated to be a human carcinogen". International Agency for Research on Cancer (IARC), part of World Health Organization, has classified PhIP as IARC Group 2B carcinogen (i.e., possibly carcinogenic to humans). There is sufficient evidence in experimental animals, as well as in vitro models, for the carcinogenicity of PhIP.

== Sources of PhIP ==
PhIP has been found in cooked beef, pork, chicken, and fish products. Exposure to PhIP depends on the eating habits of the individual and can vary up to 5000-fold. Exposure is also related to the type of meat, doneness, cooking method, and quantity consumed. Individual exposures can differ due to various anti-carcinogens in the diet. Different cooking methods for meat (broiling, grilling, frying, roasting, pan drippings) all contribute to formation of PhIP.

== PhIP and cooking methods ==
Studies examining the amount of PhIP in cooked meats have shown that high levels of exposure are possible. Doneness levels of meat (rare, medium, well-done, and very well-done) are factors in the development of PhIP. Methods to reduce formation of PhIP in meats include decreasing the temperature at which the meat is cooked, decreasing the length of cooking time, pre-heating meat in the microwave oven (which reduces creatine), and marinating the meat.

PhIP values for cooked meat
Meat type	Cooking variation	PhIP ng/g ± SD
Beef (1.5 cm thick)	Fried - medium rare (51 °C)	0.29 ± 0.14
Beef (1.5 cm thick)	Fried - well-done (63 °C)	0.73 ± 0.02
Beef (1.5 cm thick)	Fried - very well-done (74 °C)	7.33 ± 0.11
Lamb chop	Fried - medium (75 °C)	0
Lamb chop	Fried - well-done (85 °C)	2.4
Pork (2 cm thick)	Fried - medium (63 °C)	0.37 ± 0.06
Pork (2 cm thick)	Fried - well-done (83 °C)	7.82 ± 1.13
Mince beef patty (2 cm thick)	Fried - medium (51 °C)	0
Mince beef patty (2 cm thick)	Fried - well-done (58 °C)	3.96 ± 0.13
Chicken (2.5 cm, no skin)	Fried - lightly browned (63 °C)	0.2 ± 0.005
Chicken (2.5 cm, no skin)	Fried - well-done (79 °C)	17.54 ± 0.17
Sausage	Fried - lightly browned (42 °C)	0
Sausage	Fried - well browned (70 °C)	0.61 ± 0.06
Bacon, middle	Fried - lightly cooked	0.11 ± 0.002
Bacon, middle	Fried - well cooked	1.93 ± 0.37

== Dietary intake of PhIP ==
Determining dietary intake of PhIP can be obtained by more or one ways. One method used is a Food Frequency Questionaries (FFQ) which surveys a population on their estimated consumption of cooked meats. Another method directly measures the quantity of PhIP in a cooked meat sample. However, because the formation of PhIP in cooked meat items is dependent on temperature, cooking time, and cooking method, variations do occur in the direct measurement method. Direct measurement methods have determined dietary intake levels of PhIP to range from 0.07-4.3 ng/kg per day.

== Metabolism ==
Metabolic activation is required for PhIP to function as a mutagen. Therefore, the cancer risk posed by PhIP depends on the extent at which PhIP is metabolized. After absorption, PhIP is converted to a genotoxic metabolite in the liver by Phase I enzyme N-oxidation by Cytochrome P-450 1A2 (CYP1A2). PhIP can be further metabolized into a more potent metabolite through O-acetylation by hepatic or colonic N-acetyltransferase 1 (NAT1) and N-acetyltransferase 2 (NAT2), or by sulfotransferases. However, PhIP may also undergo a detoxification pathway through Phase II conjugation reaction via UDP-glucuronosyltransferases (UGTs) to form N-glucuronide conjugates. PhIP's nitrenium ion intermediate is a powerful electrophile that has propensity to form C-8 guanine adducts with the DNA. In addition, some of these metabolic enzymes are inducible and have polymorphic variation. CYP1A2 displays a 40-fold variation in expression among humans and can be induced by smoking, diet, and chronic hepatitis. The expression of UGTs also displays inducibility; however, NATs do not. Individuals can be classified as either rapid or slow N-oxidizers and O-acetylators by assessing CYP1A2 and NAT2 activities. Individuals with the rapid phenotype of either CYP1A2 or NAT2 metabolize PhIP more effectively and are therefore at greater risk of PhIP's carcinogenic metabolite and could be at a higher risk of cancer.

== Animal studies and PhIP ==
Rats were fed PhIP at concentrations of 25, 100, and 200 ppm. The rats gained weight throughout the experiment, but feeding concentration of PhIP remained constant. Rats were fed PhIP ad libitum at concentrations of 12.5 and 50ppm. Rats developed mammary tumors at each concentration of PhIP administered. An in vivo study found mice injected with 5, 10, 12, 18, 20, 24, 28, 32, or 36 mg/kg bw showed a strong correlation between consumption of PhIP and genetic damage.

== Risk assessments for PhIP ==
There is no dose [of PhIP] without effect. Therefore, a margin of exposure (MOE) based on the benchmark lower confidence limit (BMDL) reference has been developed for PhIP in relation to prostate and mammary carcinomas.

Calculated MOE for prostate carcinoma based on dietary exposure to PhIP from cooked meats
Exposure estimate (mg/kg-bw/day)	MOE for model average BMDL _{10}
Average (50%) (0.000006)	100,000
High Level (0.00002)	40,000

Calculated MOE for mammary carcinoma based on dietary exposure to PhIP from cooked meats
Exposure estimate (mg/kg-bw/day)	MOE for model average BMDL _{10}
Average (50%) (0.000006)	80,000
High Level (0.00002)	20,000

== Associated cancers ==
Numerous in vivo and in vitro studies have demonstrated that PhIP is a potent mutagen and can induce tumors of multiple sites in animal models. PhIP was positive in bacterial (Ames) test and induced chromosomal abnormalities in human and Chinese hamster cells in vitro. PhIP has also formed DNA adducts in vivo in both rats and monkeys. PhIP has been tested for carcinogenicity in both mice and rats by oral administration. Increases in lymphomas were seen in mice and increases in adenocarcinomas of the small and large intestine in males and mammary adenocarcinomas in female were seen in rats. Also, an increasing number of epidemiological studies have evaluated the association of well-done meat intake and HCA exposure with cancer risk in humans. In general, these studies have reported that high intake of well-done and/or high exposure to PhIP may be associated with cancer of the colorectum, breast, prostate, pancreas, lung, stomach, and esophagus.

PhIP has been shown to induce DNA adducts and mutations. These adducts have been found in a wide variety of sensitive tissues and organs such as the colon. However, adducts also formed in sites that did not commonly form tumors, such as the kidneys. In humans receiving a dose of PhIP equivalent to that found in very well-done chicken, DNA and protein adducts were formed in the colon and blood. However, the adducts were unstable and declined over a 24-hour period.
