= C8H11NO =

The molecular formula C_{8}H_{11}NO (molar mass: 137.17 g/mol, exact mass: 137.084064) may refer to:

- para-Cresidine
- 4-Dimethylaminophenol
- Emoxypine
- 2-Hydroxyphenethylamine
- 2-Phenoxyethylamine
- Phenetidines
- Tyramine
- meta-Tyramine
