= Mutagen X =

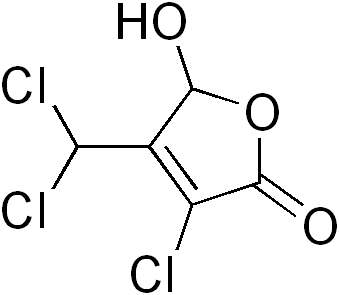

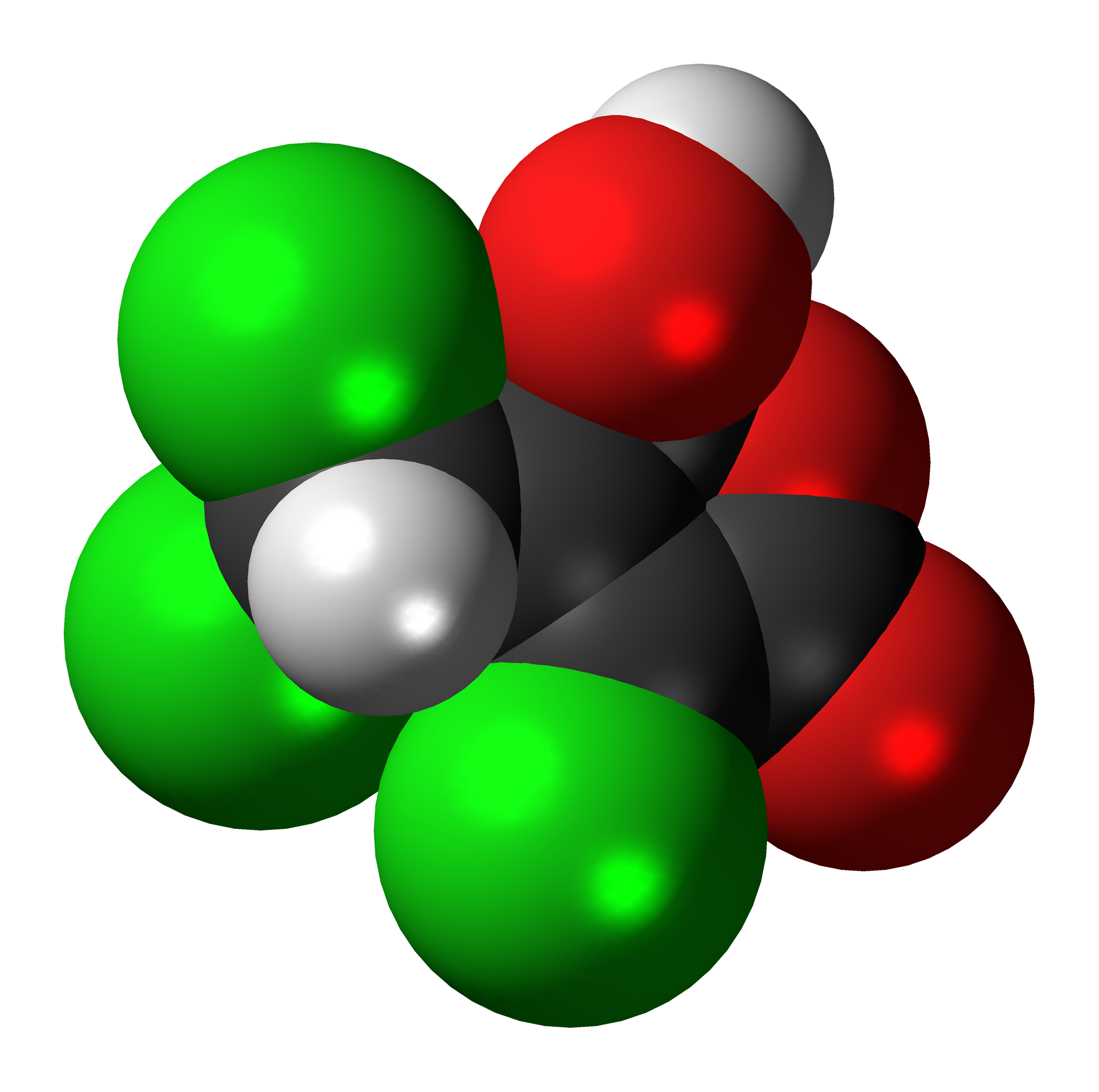

Names
- IUPAC name 3-Chloro-4-(dichloromethyl)-5-hydroxy-5H-furan-2-one
- Other names Mutagen X MX

Identifiers
CAS Number	77439-76-0
3D model (JSmol)	Interactive image
ChemSpider	48451
EC Number	253-575-7
KEGG	C19205
PubChem CID	53665
UNII	SSD7YR4366
CompTox Dashboard (EPA)	DTXSID6020276
- InChI: InChI=1S/C5H3Cl3O3/c6-2-1(3(7)8)4(9)11-5(2)10/h3-4,9H Key: WNTRMRXAGJOLCU-UHFFFAOYSA-N; InChI=1/C5H3Cl3O3/c6-2-1(3(7)8)4(9)11-5(2)10/h3-4,9H Key: WNTRMRXAGJOLCU-UHFFFAOYAU
- SMILES: O=C1OC(O)C(C(Cl)Cl)=C1Cl

Properties
Chemical formula	C_{5}H_{3}Cl_{3}O_{3}
Molar mass	217.43 g/mol
- Except where otherwise noted, data are given for materials in their standard state (at 25 °C [77 °F], 100 kPa). verify (what is ?) Infobox references

Mutagen X (MX), or 3-chloro-4-(dichloromethyl)-5-hydroxy-5H-furan-2-one, is a byproduct of the disinfection of water by chlorination. MX is produced by reaction of chlorine with natural humic acids.

MX is found in chlorinated drinking water all over the world and is an environmental carcinogen that is known to cause several types of cancer in rats when present in large enough concentrations. It is listed by the International Agency for Research on Cancer as a group 2B carcinogen meaning it is "possibly carcinogenic to humans", a category it shares with carpentry and pickled vegetables. Although the concentration of MX in drinking water is typically 100- to 1000-fold lower than other common byproducts of water chlorination such as trihalomethanes, MX might play a role in the increased cancer risks that have been associated with the consumption of chlorinated water because of its potency in inducing DNA damage.
