= Anisidine =

Anisidine can refer to any of the three possible isomers of methoxyaniline:

- o-Anisidine (2-methoxyaniline)
- m-Anisidine (3-methoxyaniline)
- p-Anisidine (4-methoxyaniline), used in measuring anisidine value
