= O-Nitroanisole =

Chemical used in dye manufacturing

o-Nitroanisole

Names
- IUPAC name 1-Methoxy-2-nitrobenzene
- Other names 2-nitroanisole

Identifiers
| CAS Number | 91-23-6 |
| 3D model (JSmol) | Interactive image |
| Beilstein Reference | 1868032 |
| ChEBI | CHEBI:48722 |
| ChEMBL | ChEMBL166415 |
| ChemSpider | 6781 |
| ECHA InfoCard | 100.001.866 |
| EC Number | 202-052-1 |
| KEGG | C19270 |
| PubChem CID | 7048 |
| RTECS number | BZ8790000 |
| UNII | ZRE7HLZ17K |
| UN number | 2730 |
| CompTox Dashboard (EPA) | DTXSID3020962 |
- InChI: InChI=1S/C7H7NO3/c1-11-7-5-3-2-4-6(7)8(9)10/h2-5H,1H3 Key: CFBYEGUGFPZCNF-UHFFFAOYSA-N
- SMILES: COC1=CC=CC=C1[N+](=O)[O-]

Properties
| Chemical formula | C_{7}H_{7}NO_{3} |
| Molar mass | 153.137 g·mol^{−1} |
| Appearance | Colorless to pale yellow/red liquid |
| Density | 1.2540 g/cm^{3} |
| Melting point | 10 °C (50 °F; 283 K) |
| Boiling point | 277 °C (531 °F; 550 K) |

Hazards
- GHS labelling
| Pictograms | (GHS07: Exclamation mark) (GHS08: Health hazard) |
| Signal word | Danger |
| Hazard statements | H302, H350 |
| Precautionary statements | P203, P264, P270, P280, P301+P317, P318, P330, P405, P501 |
- Except where otherwise noted, data are given for materials in their standard state (at 25 °C [77 °F], 100 kPa). Infobox references

o-Nitroanisole is an organic compound with the formula CH_{3}OC_{6}H_{4}NO_{2}, consisting of a benzene ring substituted with a methoxy group (−OCH_{3}) and a nitro group (−NO_{2}) ortho to each other. It is a colorless to pale yellow/red liquid soluble in organic solvents.

While three isomers of nitroanisole exist, the ortho isomer is the most used commercially, with production commencing as early as the beginning of the 20th century. It is primarily used as a precursor to o-anisidine, a compound employed in azo dye manufacturing. The International Agency for Research on Cancer lists it as a Group 2A carcinogen.

== History ==
Precise documentation for the first synthesis of o-nitroanisole is not readily available but early industrial relevance is clearly established pre-WWII. During the early 1900s, it was identified as a chemical intermediate in dye and chemical manufacturing. A 1936 US patent describes improved production methods explicitly stating o-nitroanisole has been known widely and used for a number of years. The 1936 patent indicated large scale synthesis challenges were already recognized commercially at the time.

Its significance is primarily linked to the product formed after reduction of the nitro group, forming o-anisidine used as an intermediate for azo dye synthesis. The growth of the synthetic dye industry in early-mid 20th century drove demand for o-nitroanisole. From the 1970s onwards, toxicological and regulatory studies documented properties, exposure, and potential health effects attributable to o-nitroanisole.

== Synthesis ==
o-Nitroanisole is classically prepared by electrophilic aromatic nitration of anisole using nitric acid in the presence of sulfuric acid. The methoxy substituent activating effects are ortho–para directing, which forms a mixture of regioisomers that require further efforts to isolate o-nitroanisole.

C_{6}H_{5}OCH_{3} + HNO_{3} + H_{2}SO_{4} → o-CH_{3}OC_{6}H_{4}NO_{2} + p-CH_{3}OC_{6}H_{4}NO_{2} + H_{2}O

Modern industrial production commonly synthesises o-nitroanisole by nucleophilic aromatic substitution of o-nitrochlorobenzene with methanolic sodium hydroxide or sodium methoxide. The nitro group activates the ring to displace the chloro substituent. This approach increases selectivity towards o-nitroanisole and is often associated with yields around 90%.

o-ClC_{6}H_{4}NO_{2} + CH_{3}ONa → o-CH_{3}OC_{6}H_{4}NO_{2} + NaCl

== Uses ==
2-Nitroanisole is used primarily as a precursor to o-anisidine, a compound in more than 100 types of azo dye. It is also used as an intermediate in pharmaceutical manufacturing.

== Exposure ==
The main environmental exposure is attributed to waste streams of pharmaceuticals and dye facilities. Historically, o-nitroanisole has been found as a water contaminant in Japan, China, Germany and the Netherlands where it absorbs into sediment and solids. Traces have been found in drinking water, but concentrations have not been measured and currently there is no proof of bioaccumulation in aquatic organisms. Vapors of o-nitroanisole have been identified, but naturally degrade, with a half life of 4.6 days.

Exposure to the general population occurs with contact to environmental contaminants, occupational exposure can occur during azo dye manufacturing through swallowing, skin contact or inhalation.

== Metabolism ==
o-Nitroanisole undergoes oxidative and reductive biotransformations to generate reactive intermediates responsible for its genotoxic and carcinogenic effects. The primary route of metabolism is oxidation, mediated by cytochrome P450, to form 2-nitrophenol.

The other route of metabolism is reduction of the nitro group (−NO_{2}) to an amine (−NH_{2}), mediated by xanthine oxidase acting as a nitroreductase, to form o-anisidine. This metabolite undergoes further bioactivation to hydroxylamine derivatives. The oxidation of o-anisidine and hydroxylamine derivatives by cytochrome P450 enzymes generates N-(2-methoxyphenyl)hydroxylamine that rearrange to nitrenium ions.

== Mechanism of action ==
The toxicity of o-nitroanisole is attributed to the reactive species formed through biotransformations. The primary route of genotoxicity arises from N-(2-methoxyphenyl)hydroxylamine, a lipophilic intermediate which enters the nucleus, although the exact mechanism has not been established. It breaks down into reactive nitrenium ions that covalently bind to DNA which interferes with replication.

== Toxicity ==
Although no direct evidence of carcinogenicity has been found in humans, o-nitroanisole is regarded as an irritant, health hazard, and potential cancer-causing agent upon exposure by inhalation, swallowing or skin contact.

Nitrenium ions are a highly reactive species that preferentially bind to nucleophilic sites on DNA. In vivo rodent studies found evidence for tissue-specific metabolism, with DNA adducts primarily detected in the urinary bladder, liver, and spleen.

A long term study was conducted in rodents by the United States National Toxicology Program to assess the toxicity of o-nitroanisole, with carcinogenic effects exhibited after exposure in the liver, blood, bladder, kidney, and large intestine.

o-Nitroanisole also exhibits genotoxic effects: DNA adducts in bladder, liver, kidney, and spleen cells, while DNA breaks were seen in kidney and bladder cells.

== Regulations ==
o-Nitroanisole is internationally classified as a Group 2A carcinogen (probably carcinogenic to humans) by the International Agency for Research on Cancer, as of 2020. It was upgraded due to similarities to many Group 1 compounds and sufficient evidence obtained from animal models.
