= Heterocyclic amine formation in meat =

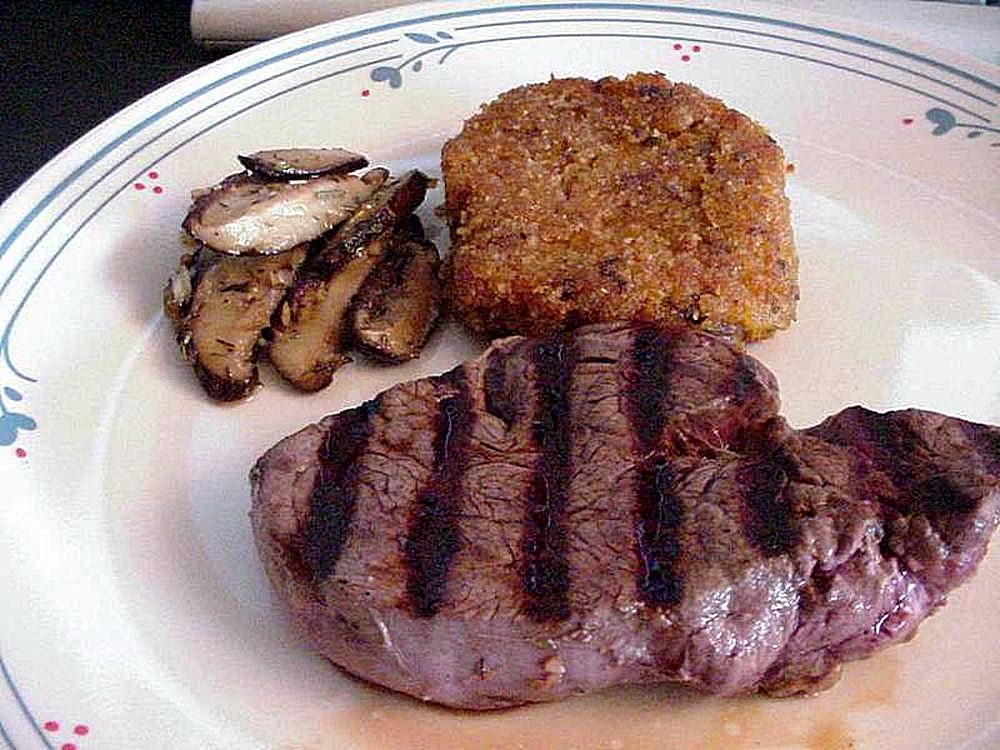
A well-done steak, with accompaniments. The black lines where it has rested on the grill will contain heterocyclic amines.

Heterocyclic amines (HCAs) are a group of chemical compounds, many of which can be formed during cooking. They are found in meats that are cooked to the "well done" stage, in pan drippings and in meat surfaces that show a brown or black crust. Epidemiological studies show associations between intakes of heterocyclic amines and cancers of the colon, rectum, breast, prostate, pancreas, lung, stomach, and esophagus, and animal feeding experiments support a causal relationship. The U.S. Department of Health and Human Services Public Health Service labeled several heterocyclic amines as likely carcinogens in its 13th Report on Carcinogens. Changes in cooking techniques reduce the level of heterocyclic amines.

== Compounds ==
More than 20 compounds fall into the category of heterocyclic amines. Table 1 shows the chemical name and abbreviation of those most commonly studied.

Table 1. Chemical names and abbreviations for HCAs
Chemical name	Chemical structure	Abbreviation	Year discovered
2-Amino-3-methylimidazo[4,5-f]quinoline		IQ	1980
2-Amino-3,4-dimethylimidazo[4,5-f]quinoline		MeIQ	1980
2-Amino-3,8-dimethylimidazo[4,5-f]quinoxaline		MeIQx	1981
2-Amino-1-methyl-6-phenylimiazo[4,5-b]pyridine		PhIP	1986

All four of these compounds are included in the 13th Report on Carcinogens.

== Meat ==
The compounds found in food are formed when creatine (a non-protein amino acid found in muscle tissue), other amino acids and monosaccharides are heated together at high temperatures (125-300 °C or 275-572 °F) or cooked for long periods. HCAs form at the lower end of this range when the cooking time is long; at the higher end of the range, HCAs are formed within minutes.

=== Cooked ground beef ===
A review of 14 studies of HCA content in ground beef cooked under home conditions found in northern Europe and the U.S. found a range of values (Table 2). Because a standard U.S. serving of meat is 3 ounces, Table 2 includes a projection of the maximum amount of HCAs that could be found in a ground beef patty.

Table 2. Content of four HCAs in ground beef
HCA	Amount, ng/g	Maximum amount in 3 ounces of ground beef (in ng)
IQ	n.d.-1.6	136
MeIQ	n.d.-1.7	145
MeIQx	n.d.-16.4	1395
PhIP	n.d.-68	5783

(n.d.= none detected)

==== United States ====
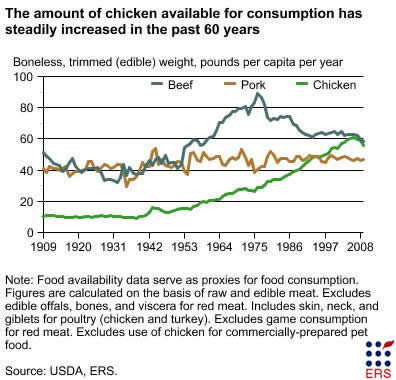
Meat consumption in the U.S.

Meat is a major component of American diets. Data from 1960 show the combined annual per capita consumption of beef, pork and chicken at 148 pounds; in 2004, that amount increased to 195 pounds a year. Ground beef made up 42% of the beef market in 2000. Beef consumption, particularly ground and processed beef, is highest in households with incomes at or below 130 percent of the poverty level.

Patterns of beef intake by race/ethnicity show that non-Hispanic whites and Asians consumed the least amount of beef. Non-Hispanic African-Americans had the highest per capita intake of processed beef, ground beef and steaks compared to three other race/ethnicity groups.

More than half of beef purchased in the U.S. comes from retail stores and is prepared at home. Ground beef makes up the highest per capita intakes of beef both at home and away from home.

Ground beef consumption is highest among males age 12-19 who consume on average 50 pounds per year per capita. The 12-19 age group showed the highest consumption of ground beef for females, but the amount (28.5 lbs) is much lower than that of males.

US dietary exposure has been estimated at 1-17 ng/kg bodyweight per day. Table 3 shows the average daily lifetime consumption of HCAs for subgroups of the U.S. population. This analysis was based on the food intake data of 27215 people participating in the 1994 to 1996 Continuing Survey of Food Intakes by Individuals (CSFII) survey. Approximately 16 percent of HCA exposure came from hamburgers.

Table 3. Lifetime average weighted intake of four HCAs by men and women in the U.S.
HCA type	Lifetime average intake - All, ng/day	Lifetime average intake - All men, ng/kg/day
PhIP	6.0	6.2
MeIQx	1.1	1.2
DiMeQx	0.20	0.21
IQ	0.23	0.18

African American males had 50-100% higher intakes than white males and African American males consumed three times as many HCAs as white males (Table 4).

Table 4. Estimated mean intakes of HCAs among children under 16 by ethnicity, ng/kg/day
HCA type	White	African American	Asian/Pacific Islander
PhIP	6.1	12.0	10.0
MeIQx	1.2	1.8	1.9
DiMeQx	0.23	0.51	0.27
IQ	0.16	0.24	0.29

== Cooking ==
HCA formation during cooking depends on the type of meat, cooking temperature, the degree of browning and the cooking time. Meats that are lower in fat and water content show higher concentrations of HCAs after cooking. More HCAs are formed when pan surface temperatures are higher than 220 °C (428 °F) such as with most frying or grilling. However, HCAs also form at lower temperatures when the cooking time is long, as in roasting. HCA concentrations are higher in browned or burned crusts that result from high temperature. The pan drippings and meat bits that remain after meat is fried have high concentrations of HCAs. Beef, chicken and fish have higher concentrations than pork. Sausages are high in fat and water and show lower concentrations.

Ground beef patties show lower levels of HCAs if they are flipped every minute until the target temperature is reached. Beef patties cooked while frozen show no difference in HCA levels compared to room-temperature patties.

== Cancer ==
After scientists discovered the carcinogenic components in cigarette smoke, they questioned whether carcinogens could also be found in smoked/burned foods, such as meats. In 1977, cancer-causing compounds heterocyclic amines were discovered in food as a result of household cooking processes.

The most potent of the HCAs, MeIQ, is almost 24 times more carcinogenic than aflatoxin, a carcinogen produced by mold.

Most of the 20 HCAs are more toxic than benzopyrene, a carcinogen found in cigarette smoke and coal tar. MeIQ, IQ and 8-MeIQx are the most potent mutagens according to the Ames test. These HCAs are 100 times more potent carcinogens than PhIP, the compound most commonly found as a result of normal cooking.

HCAs contribute to the development of cancer by causing gene mutations, causing new cells to grow in an uncontrolled manner and form a tumor. Epidemiological studies linked consumption of well-done meats with increased risk of certain cancers, including cancer of the colon or rectum. A review of research articles on meat consumption and colon cancer estimated that red meat consumption contributed to 7 to 9% of colon cancer cases in European men and women.

=== Animal studies ===
Long-term rat studies showed that PhIP causes cancer of the colon and mammary gland in rats. Female rats given doses of 0, 12.4, 25, 50, 100 or 200 ppm of PhIP showed a dose-dependent incidence of adenocarcinomas. The offspring of female rats exposed to PhIP while pregnant had a higher prevalence of adenocarcinomas than those whose mothers had not been exposed. This was true even for offspring who were not exposed to PhIP. PhIP was transferred from mothers to offspring in their milk.

=== Epidemiological studies ===
The effects of HCAs and well-done cooked meat on humans are less well established. Meat consumption, especially of well-done meat and meat cooked at a high temperature, can be used as an indirect measure of exposure to HCAs. A review of all research studies reported between 1996 and 2007 that examined relationships between HCAs, meat and cancer. Twenty-two studies were found; of these, 18 showed a relationship between either meat intake or HCA exposure and some form of cancer. HCA exposure was measured in 10 of the studies and of those, 70% showed an association with cancer. The authors concluded that high intake of well-done meat and/or high exposure to certain HCAs may be associated with cancer of the colon, breast, prostate, pancreas, lung, stomach and esophagus.

A recent study found that the relative risk for colorectal cancer increased at intakes >41.4 ng/day. Some evidence of increased relative risk occurred with intakes of MeIQx greater than or equal to 19.9 ng/day, but the trend was not as strong as for PhIP.

Recent studies had mixed results, finding no relationship between dietary heterocyclic amines and lung cancer in women who had never smoked, no relationship between HCA intake and prostate cancer risk, but suggesting a positive association between red meat, PhIP and bladder cancer and increased risk of advanced prostate cancer with intakes of meat cooked at high temperatures.

Although not all studies report an association between HCA and/or meat intake and cancers, the U.S. Department of Health and Human Services Public Health Service National Toxicology Program found sufficient evidence to label four HCAs as "reasonably anticipated to be a human carcinogen" in its twelfth Report on Carcinogens, published in 2011. The HCA known as IQ was first listed in the tenth report in 2002. MeIQ, MeIQx and PhIP were added to the list of anticipated carcinogens in 2004. The Report on Carcinogens stated that MeIQ has been associated with rectal and colon cancer, MeIQx with lung cancer, IQ with breast cancer and PhIP with stomach and breast cancer. However, no current federal guidelines focus on the recommended consumption limit of HCA levels in meat.
