= 2-Nitrofluorene =

- Kekulé, skeletal formula of 2-nitrofluorene

Names
- Preferred IUPAC name 2-Nitro-9H-fluorene

Identifiers
CAS Number	607-57-8
3D model (JSmol)	Interactive image; Interactive image
Beilstein Reference	1877983
ChEBI	CHEBI:1224
ChEMBL	ChEMBL351487
ChemSpider	11338
ECHA InfoCard	100.009.217
EC Number	210-138-5
KEGG	C10923
MeSH	2-Nitrofluorene
PubChem CID	11831
RTECS number	LL8225000
UNII	191LL4U4GZ
UN number	3077
CompTox Dashboard (EPA)	DTXSID2020971
- InChI: InChI=1S/C13H9NO2/c15-14(16)11-5-6-13-10(8-11)7-9-3-1-2-4-12(9)13/h1-6,8H,7H2 Key: XFOHWECQTFIEIX-UHFFFAOYSA-N
- SMILES: [O-][N+](=O)c1ccc2c(Cc3ccccc-23)c1; [O-][N+](=O)C1=CC2=C(C=C1)C1=CC=CC=C1C2

Properties
Chemical formula	C_{13}H_{9}NO_{2}
Molar mass	211.220 g·mol^{−1}
Melting point	156 to 158 °C (313 to 316 °F; 429 to 431 K)
log P	3.982

Hazards
- GHS labelling
Pictograms	(GHS08: Health hazard)
Signal word	Warning
Hazard statements	H351
Precautionary statements	P281
- Except where otherwise noted, data are given for materials in their standard state (at 25 °C [77 °F], 100 kPa). verify (what is ?) Infobox references

2-Nitrofluorene is a by-product of combustion and is a nitrated polycyclic aromatic hydrocarbon (fluorene). 2-Nitrofluorene is listed as an IARC Group 2B carcinogen, indicating it is possibly carcinogenic to humans.
