= Diglycidyl resorcinol ether =

Names
- IUPAC name 2-[[3-(oxiran-2-ylmethoxy)phenoxy]methyl]oxirane
- Other names 1,3-Bis(2,3-epoxypropoxy)benzene; 1,3-Diglycidyloxybenzene; 2,2'-(1,3-Phenylenebis(oxymethylene))bisoxirane; Araldite ERE 1359; m-bis(2,3-epoxypropoxy)-Benzene; Diglycidyl ether of resorcinol; Diglycidylresorcinol ether; m-Bis(2,3-epoxypropoxy)benzene; m-Bis(glycidyloxy)benzene; Resorcinol bis(2,3-epoxypropyl) ether; Resorcinol diglycidyl ether; Oxirane, 2,2'-(1,3-phenylenebis(oxymethylene))bis-

Identifiers
CAS Number	101-90-6
3D model (JSmol)	Interactive image
Abbreviations	DGRE
ChEBI	CHEBI:82318
ChEMBL	ChEMBL1338613
ChemSpider	7305
ECHA InfoCard	100.002.716
EC Number	202-987-5
KEGG	C19228
PubChem CID	7586
RTECS number	VH1050000
UNII	FXN2Y6QZ2W
UN number	2811
CompTox Dashboard (EPA)	DTXSID2020470
- InChI: InChI=1S/C12H14O4/c1-2-9(13-5-11-7-15-11)4-10(3-1)14-6-12-8-16-12/h1-4,11-12H,5-8H2 Key: WPYCRFCQABTEKC-UHFFFAOYSA-N
- SMILES: C1C(O1)COC2=CC(=CC=C2)OCC3CO3

Properties
Chemical formula	C_{12}H_{14}O_{4}
Molar mass	222.239 g/mol
Density	1.21
Melting point	32–33 °C (90–91 °F; 305–306 K)

Hazards
- GHS labelling
Pictograms	(GHS06: Toxic) (GHS07: Exclamation mark) (GHS08: Health hazard)
Signal word	Danger
Hazard statements	H302, H311, H315, H317, H319, H341, H350, H412
Precautionary statements	P203, P261, P264, P264+P265, P270, P272, P273, P280, P281, P301+P317, P302+P352, P305+P351+P338, P316, P318, P321, P330, P332+P317, P333+P313, P337+P317, P361+P364, P362+P364, P405, P501
- Except where otherwise noted, data are given for materials in their standard state (at 25 °C [77 °F], 100 kPa). Infobox references

Diglycidyl resorcinol ether, also called Resorcinol diglycidyl ether (RDGE) is a liquid aromatic organic chemical compound and chemically a glycidyl ether.

The formula is C_{12}H_{14}O_{4} and the CAS Registry Number 101-90-6. It is one of a number of glycidyl ethers available commercially that are used to reduce the viscosity of epoxy resins. These are then further used in coatings, sealants, adhesives and elastomers. It has the CAS Registry Number 101-90-6. It has the IUPAC name 2-[[3-(oxiran-2-ylmethoxy)phenoxy]methyl]oxirane and is registered on TSCA (Toxic Substances Control Act of 1976) as Oxirane, 2,2'-[1,3-phenylenebis(oxymethylene)]bis-. It is REACH registered and on EINECS.

== Synonyms ==
- 1,3-Bis(2,3-epoxypropoxy)benzene
- 1,3-Diglycidyloxybenzene
- 2,2'-(1,3-Phenylenebis(oxymethylene))bisoxirane
- Araldite ERE 1359
- Diglycidyl ether of resorcinol
- m-Bis(2,3-epoxypropoxy)benzene
- meta-Bis(glycidyloxy)benzene
- Oxirane, 2,2'-(1,3-phenylenebis(oxymethylene))bis-
- RDGE
- Resorcinol bis(2,3-epoxypropyl)ether
- Resorcinol diglycidyl ether

== Synthesis ==
Resorcinol and epichlorohydrin are reacted in the presence of a base and not a Lewis acid catalyst as normal with glycidyl ethers. A halohydrin is formed. This is followed by washing with sodium hydroxide in dehydrochlorination step. This forms Resorcinol diglycidyl ether. The waste products are water and sodium chloride and excess caustic soda. One of the quality control tests would involve measuring the Epoxy value by determination of the epoxy equivalent weight.

== Uses ==
The material has two oxirane groups and is thus used mainly in epoxy resins systems as a reactive diluent and modifier. It has found use as an additive for bonding resin systems and also as a modifier for phenolic resins Despite the toxicity it generally gives excellent properties and so there are military applications. The use of the diluent does effect mechanical properties and microstructure of epoxy resins. However, this diluent is one of the best for not reducing properties too much.

== Toxicology ==
It is classed as IARC group 2B by the International Agency for Research on Cancer. The toxicology has been studied for a long time and is fairly well understood.

== External Websites ==
- Parchem RDGE
- Technical Data Sheet
- Safety Data Sheet
