= Safe handling of carcinogens =

The safe handling of carcinogens is the handling of cancer causing substances in a safe and responsible manner. Carcinogens are defined as 'a substance or agent that can cause cells to become cancerous by altering their genetic structure so that they multiply continuously and become malignant'. The World Health Organization breaks down the three types of carcinogens that can cause cancer in humans. The first type of carcinogen is the physical type which can be ultraviolet and ionizing radiation. The second type of carcinogens is defined as asbestos, tobacco smoke, alcohol, aflatoxin, and arsenic. The third type of carcinogen is biological which highlights infections that can be caused from viruses, bacteria, or parasites. There are many risk factors when it comes to the human body and carcinogens, which is why it is so important that the proper approach is used when attempting to reduce exposure to cancer causing carcinogens.

== Routes of exposure ==
The main routes of exposure to carcinogens come from direct contact through the methods of inhalation, contact, injection, absorption or ingestion. Each of these exposure routes and severity of damage can vary depending on the potential carcinogen in question. As many carcinogens have a chronic effect and symptoms may only appear after repeated long term exposure, making symptoms and exposure hard to monitor.

== Methods to control exposure ==
The World Health Organization determines that approximately 30 to 50% of current known cancers can be prevented if the proper prevention methods are utilized. Prevention can be brought about in different ways, with each having different effectiveness levels. Many employers have standard operating procedures that are in place to ensure carcinogens are handled properly with the correct level of protection for the individual handling the carcinogen. Prevention can be accomplished by:

=== Equipment design ===
Standard containment devices such as fume hoods, glove boxes, use of high efficiency particulate air (HEPA) filters, ventilated containment or weighing, or placing the carcinogenic substance in a sealed weighed container (Tare Method). The employment of these methods and equipment can help reduce the unnecessary exposure to the carcinogens. Special care must be taken when using single exposure carcinogens such as polycyclic aromatic hydrocarbons. All surfaces where carcinogens are used must be of a suitable material, e.g.: stainless steel, plastic trays or absorbent plastic backed paper. Correct signs must be placed outside of the work stating 'No eating, drinking or smoking' and 'Danger carcinogen in use. Authorized personnel only'.

=== Elimination ===
Ideally carcinogenic substances should be avoided by substitution with less hazardous substances. Alternate form of carcinogenic substances may also be used to minimize the risk of exposure. In the case of carcinogens which pose a danger through inhalation, pastes or pellets can be used to avoid the possibility of airborne dust. Volatile liquids can also potentially be substituted with paste forms to avoid excessive formation of vapors.

=== Personal protective equipment ===
The correct personal protective equipment must be worn when handling carcinogens. Ensure safety goggles, impermeable gloves (of an appropriate material), respirator (if appropriate), face shield, impermeable apron, closed toed shoes, long sleeved lab coat are worn. Disposable aprons and lab coats are preferable to reduce risks of repeated exposure.

=== Accident procedures ===
A quick response to an accident or spill can greatly reduce exposure to a carcinogenic substance. If a spill or accident occurs ensure that the contaminated materials are disposed of in the correct hazardous waste bin(ensure stained clothing is removed immediately), a correct spill kit is used on the spill, in the case of a liquid spill, ensure that the spill is cleaned as soon as possible to prevent the formation of aerosols, have employees tested for exposure to carcinogens, refer to MSDS for specific treatment or dangers. Prepare spill kits and emergency plans prior to beginning use of the carcinogenic substances and in the case of a large spill vacate the area and call for assistance.

=== Storage ===
The correct storage of carcinogens is important in reducing exposure. Limit access to carcinogens, keep containers and amounts used as small as possible, double containers and chemical resistant trays. Store in a designated area with the appropriate hazard signs and ventilation if required. The carcinogens should be stored in a separate area to flammable solids and corrosive liquids as to avoid any damage to containers and possible leaking of carcinogenic compounds. Refer to the MSDS or the company specific standard operating procedures for the best solution to storing any carcinogen.

=== Decontamination ===
After use of a carcinogen or if exposure to a carcinogen has occurred, ensure the correct decontamination procedure is executed. Personnel must wash hands and arms with soap and water, immediately after handling. If exposure occurs, contact emergency health services and use safety shower/eye wash station. Decontamination of area procedures vary depending on the material being handled. Toxicity of some materials can be neutralized with other agents (refer to the MSDS for appropriate action). All surfaces should be wiped down with an appropriate cleaning agent. All waste materials and contaminated PPE must be disposed of in hazardous waste bins. All equipment used must be decontaminated before removing them from the designated area.
