= Dambu nama =

Spiced shredded dried meat from Northern Nigeria

Dambu nama, also spelled dambun nama, is a traditional West African meat dish made from dried, shredded beef, goat, chicken or ram meat. It is especially popular in Northern Nigeria and among Hausa-speaking communities across the Sahel region. Known for its candy floss texture and fibrous savoriness, it is often eaten as a snack or served with other meals.

== Preparation ==
The dish is prepared by boiling meat with spices until tender. The meat is then shredded or pounded into fine strands, after which it is fried or dried further. Additional ingredients such as chili powder, onions, bouillon seasoning, and oil are added to enhance flavor and texture. The result is a dry, chewy meat product with a long shelf life that allows for storage without refrigeration.

== Variations ==
While beef is the most commonly used meat, variations of Dambu Nama can be made with other proteins such as chicken. Recipes differ by region and household, with adjustments made to spice blends, preparation methods, and levels of dryness or oiliness.

== See also ==
- Kilishi
- Meat floss
- Cuisine of Nigeria
- Hausa cuisine
