= Nitroanisole =

Nitroanisole can refer to any of the three possible isomers of nitroanisole:

- o-Nitroanisole (2-nitroanisole)
- m-Nitroanisole (3-nitroanisole)
- p-Nitroanisole (4-nitroanisole)
