= P-Anisidine =

p-Anisidine

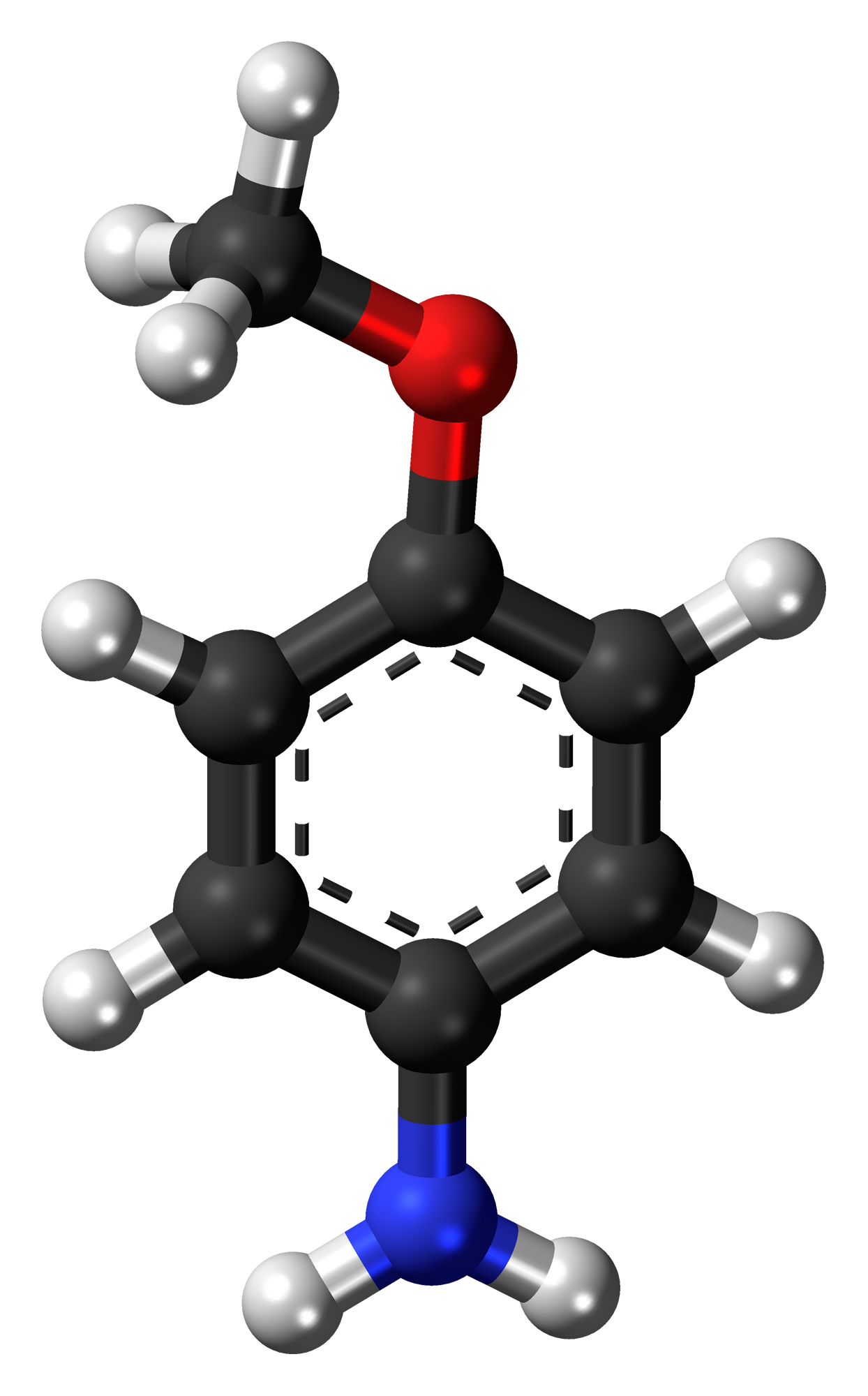

Names
- Preferred IUPAC name 4-Methoxyaniline
- Other names para-Anisidine; 4-Aminoanisole; p-Aminoanisole

Identifiers
CAS Number	104-94-9
3D model (JSmol)	Interactive image
ChEBI	CHEBI:82388
ChEMBL	ChEMBL295652
ChemSpider	13869414
ECHA InfoCard	100.002.959
EC Number	203-254-2
KEGG	C19326
PubChem CID	7732
RTECS number	BZ5450000
UNII	575917SNR4
UN number	2431
CompTox Dashboard (EPA)	DTXSID7024532
- InChI: InChI=1S/C7H9NO/c1-9-7-4-2-6(8)3-5-7/h2-5H,8H2,1H3 Key: BHAAPTBBJKJZER-UHFFFAOYSA-N; InChI=1/C7H9NO/c1-9-7-4-2-6(8)3-5-7/h2-5H,8H2,1H3
- SMILES: COc1ccc(cc1)N

Properties
Chemical formula	C_{7}H_{9}NO
Molar mass	123.155 g·mol^{−1}
Appearance	Light reddish brown solid
Odor	Fishy
Density	1.071 (at 57 °C)
Melting point	56 to 59 °C (133 to 138 °F; 329 to 332 K)
Boiling point	243 °C (469 °F; 516 K)
Solubility in water	Sparingly soluble
Solubility in other solvents	Soluble in ethanol, diethyl ether, acetone, benzene
Vapor pressure	0.006 mmHg (25 °C)
Magnetic susceptibility (χ)	−80.56·10^{−6} cm^{3}/mol
Refractive index (n_{D})	1.5559

Hazards
- Occupational safety and health (OHS/OSH)
Main hazards	Carcinogen
- GHS labelling
Pictograms	(GHS06: Toxic) (GHS08: Health hazard) (GHS09: Environmental hazard)
Signal word	Warning
Hazard statements	H300, H310, H330, H350, H373, H400
Precautionary statements	P201, P202, P260, P262, P264, P270, P271, P273, P280, P281, P284, P301+P310, P302+P350, P304+P340, P308+P313, P310, P314, P320, P321, P330, P361, P363, P391, P403+P233, P405, P501
Flash point	122 °C (252 °F; 395 K)
Autoignition temperature	515 °C (959 °F; 788 K)
- Lethal dose or concentration (LD, LC)
LD_{50} (median dose)	145 mg/kg (rabbit, oral); 130 mg/kg (mouse, oral); 140 mg/kg (rat, oral)
LD_{Lo} (lowest published)	100 mg/kg (mouse, oral)
- NIOSH (US health exposure limits)
PEL (Permissible)	TWA 0.5 mg/m^{3} [skin]
REL (Recommended)	TWA 0.5 mg/m^{3} [skin]
IDLH (Immediate danger)	50 mg/m^{3}

Related compounds
Related compounds	o-Anisidine m-Anisidine
- Except where otherwise noted, data are given for materials in their standard state (at 25 °C [77 °F], 100 kPa). verify (what is ?) Infobox references

p-Anisidine (or para-anisidine) is an organic compound with the formula CH_{3}OC_{6}H_{4}NH_{2}. A white solid, commercial samples can appear grey-brown owing to air oxidation. It is one of three isomers of anisidine, methoxy-containing anilines. It is prepared by reduction of 4-nitroanisole.

== Anisidine value ==
p-Anisidine condenses readily with aldehydes and ketones to form Schiff bases, which absorb at 350 nm. This colorimetric reaction is used to test for the presence of oxidation products in fats and oils, an official method for detecting them by the American Oil Chemists' Society. It is particularly good at detecting unsaturated aldehydes, which are the ones that are most likely to generate unacceptable flavors, making it particularly useful in food quality testing.

== Safety ==
p-Anisidine is a relatively toxic compound with a permissible exposure limit of 0.5 mg/m^{3}.
