= Heterocyclic amine =

Any heterocyclic compound having at least one nitrogen heteroatom

Niacin, essential to many types of life, is an example of a heterocyclic amine.

Heterocyclic amines, also sometimes referred to as HCAs, are chemical compounds containing at least one heterocyclic ring, which by definition has atoms of at least two different elements, as well as at least one amine (nitrogen-containing) group. Typically it is a nitrogen atom of an amine group that also makes the ring heterocyclic (e.g., pyridine), though compounds exist in which this is not the case (e.g., the drug zileuton). The biological functions of heterocyclic amines vary, including vitamins and carcinogens. Carcinogenic heterocyclic amines are created by high temperature cooking of meat and smoking of plant matter like tobacco. Some well known heterocyclic amines are niacin (vitamin B3), nicotine (psychoactive alkaloid and recreational drug), and the nucleobases that encode genetic information in DNA.

== Five-membered heterocyclic amines ==
The compound pyrrolidine is composed of molecules that contain a saturated ring of five atoms. This cyclic structure is composed of one atom of nitrogen and four carbon. Nicotine is a molecule containing a pyrrolidine ring attached to a ring of pyridine (other heterocyclic amine). Nicotine belongs to a group of compounds known as alkaloids, which are naturally occurring organic compounds with nitrogen in them. Pyrrole is another compound made up of molecules with a five-membered heterocyclic ring. These molecules are unsaturated and contain a nitrogen atom in the ring. Four pyrrole rings are joined in a ring structure called a porphyrin. The rings of porphyrin are components of hemoglobin, myoglobin, vitamin B12, chlorophyll, and cytochromes. In the centers of heme in hemoglobin, myoglobin, and cytochromes, iron is an ion; in the first two, iron ion is bound to oxygen.

== Six-membered heterocyclic amines ==
The structure of pyridine is similar to that of benzene except that a nitrogen atom replaces one carbon atom. Pyridine is used as a flavoring agent. The pyridine ring is part of two B vitamins: niacin and pyridoxine. Niacin, also called nicotinic acid, is found in most organisms. Via metabolism, it becomes nicotinamide adenine dinucleotide NAD, a coenzyme which is involved in oxidation and reduction in metabolic cells. A deficiency of niacin leads to a disease called pellagra. Pyridoxine or vitamin B6, it becomes a major compound in the metabolism of amino acids.

Pyrimidine is a heterocyclic amine that contains two nitrogen atoms in an unsaturated six-membered ring. An example of a molecule that contains pyrimidine is thiamine, which is also known as vitamin B1. Thiamine deficiency produces beriberi. Pyrimidine is a component of the nucleobases cytosine, uracil, and thymine. The other two nucleobases, adenine and guanine, are also heterocyclic amines called purines; they are composed of a fused pyrimidine and imidazole.

== Heterocyclic amines and cancer ==
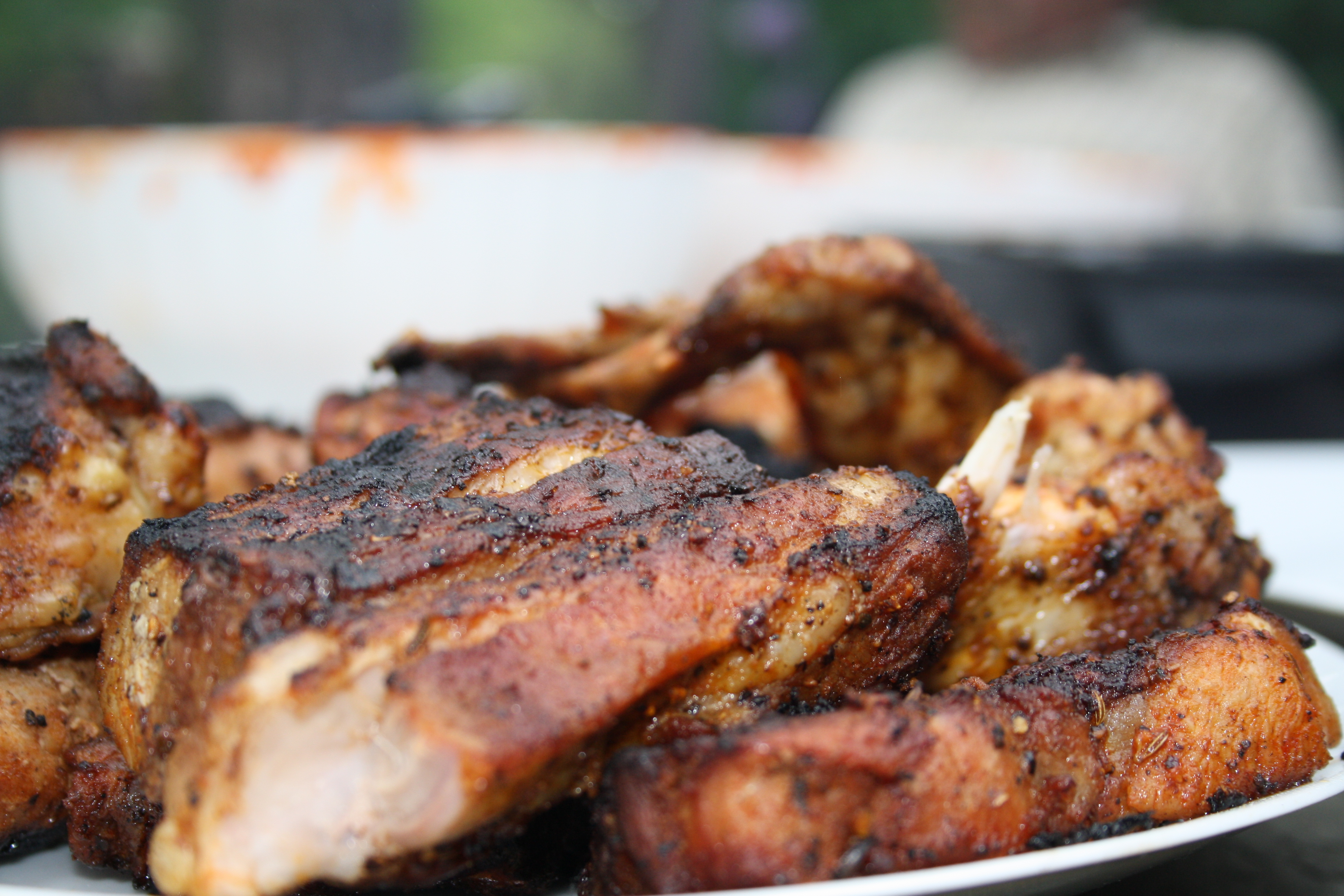
High-temperature cooking (particularly charring) of meat forms some cancer-causing heterocyclic amines.

Some HCAs found in cooked and especially burned meat are known carcinogens. Research has shown that heterocyclic amine formation in meat occurs at high cooking temperatures. Heterocyclic amines are the carcinogenic chemicals formed from cooking muscle meats such as beef, lamb, pork, fish and poultry. HCAs form when amino acids and creatine (a chemical found in muscles) react at high cooking temperatures.

Colorectal cancer is associated with high intakes of HCAs found in meat cooked at high temperature.

Six hours of marinating in beer or red wine cut levels of two types of HCA in beef steak by up to 90% compared with unmarinated steak.

== Heterocyclic amines and neurological disorders ==
Harmane, a β-carboline alkaloid found in meats is "highly tremorogenic" (tremor inducing). While harmane has been found in roughly 50% higher concentrations in patients with essential tremor than in controls, there is no direct correlation between blood-levels and levels of daily meat consumption, suggesting a difference in metabolism of this chemical plays a greater role. These chemicals are formed during the cooking process of meat, particularly the longer they are cooked, and the more they are exposed to high temperatures during cooking.

== See also ==
- Heterocyclic amine formation in meat
- Polycyclic aromatic hydrocarbons
