= Para-Cresidine =

para-Cresidine

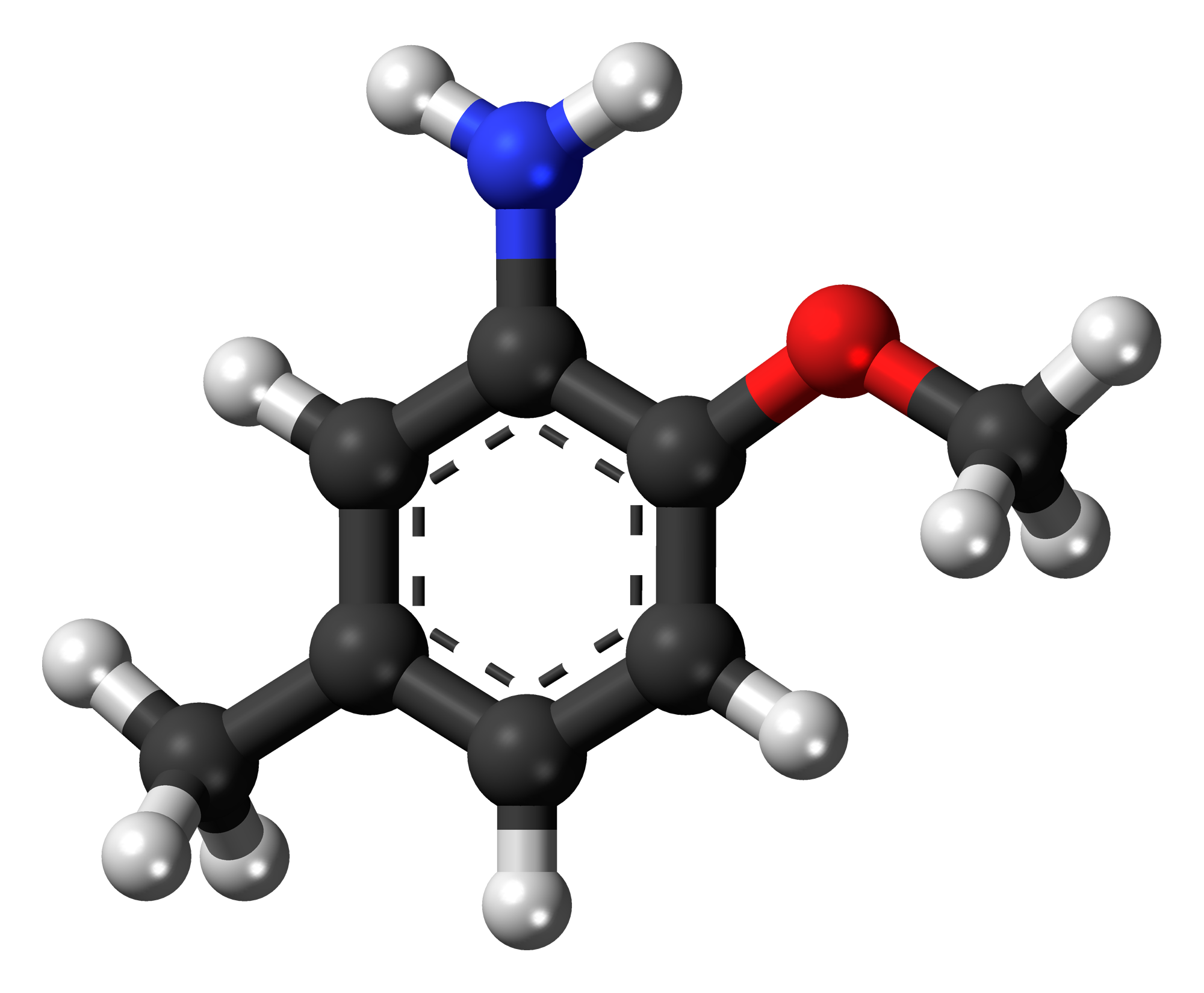

Names
- Preferred IUPAC name 2-Methoxy-5-methylaniline

Identifiers
CAS Number	120-71-8
3D model (JSmol)	Interactive image
ChemSpider	13869579
ECHA InfoCard	100.004.018
KEGG	C19216
PubChem CID	8445
RTECS number	BZ6720000
UNII	4C11L78UR3
CompTox Dashboard (EPA)	DTXSID1020350
- InChI: InChI=1S/C8H11NO/c1-6-3-4-8(10-2)7(9)5-6/h3-5H,9H2,1-2H3 Key: WXWCDTXEKCVRRO-UHFFFAOYSA-N; InChI=1/C8H11NO/c1-6-3-4-8(10-2)7(9)5-6/h3-5H,9H2,1-2H3 Key: WXWCDTXEKCVRRO-UHFFFAOYAY
- SMILES: CC1=CC(=C(C=C1)OC)N

Properties
Chemical formula	C_{8}H_{11}NO
Molar mass	137.179
Appearance	White crystals
Melting point	51.5 °C (124.7 °F; 324.6 K)
Boiling point	235 °C (455 °F; 508 K)
- Except where otherwise noted, data are given for materials in their standard state (at 25 °C [77 °F], 100 kPa). verify (what is ?) Infobox references

para-Cresidine is an organic compound with the formula CH_{3}OC_{6}H_{3}(CH_{3})NH_{2}. It is a white solid that is soluble in organic solvents. The compound features both amine and methoxy functional groups. It is used as an intermediate in preparation of dyes and pigments.

== Synthesis and reactions ==
The compound is obtained in several steps from 4-chlorotoluene. Nitration gives mainly 3-nitro-4-chlorotoluene, which reacts with methoxide sources to give 4-methoxy-2-nitrotoluene. Reduction of this nitro compound affords the aniline.

Sulfonation with oleum gives 4-amino-5-methoxy-2-methylbenzenesulfonic acid. This sulfonic acid is a precursor to allura red AC, a red food coloring.

Allura Red AC is a popular food coloring agent made from para-cresidine.
