= O-Anisidine =

o-Anisidine

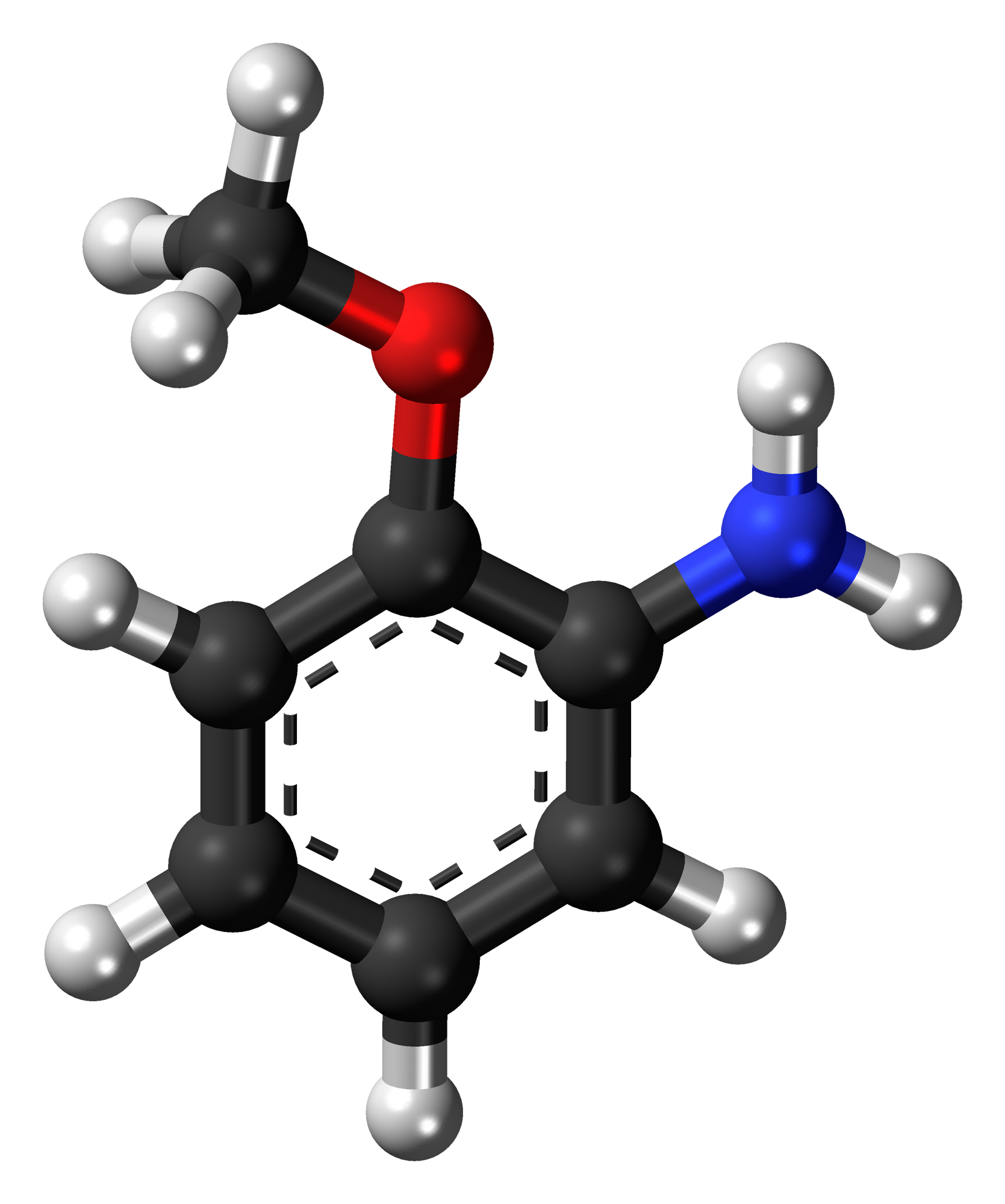

Names
- Preferred IUPAC name 2-Methoxyaniline
- Other names ortho-Anisidine; 2-Anisidine ortho-Aminoanisole o-Methoxyaniline; 2-Methoxy-1-aminobenzene; 2-Methoxyphenylamine

Identifiers
CAS Number	90-04-0
3D model (JSmol)	Interactive image
ChEBI	CHEBI:82288
ChEMBL	ChEMBL1612004
ChemSpider	13860775
ECHA InfoCard	100.001.785
EC Number	201-963-1
KEGG	C19191
PubChem CID	7000
RTECS number	BZ5410000
UNII	NUX042F201
UN number	2431
CompTox Dashboard (EPA)	DTXSID5023877
- InChI: InChI=1S/C7H9NO/c1-9-7-5-3-2-4-6(7)8/h2-5H,8H2,1H3 Key: VMPITZXILSNTON-UHFFFAOYSA-N; InChI=1/C7H9NO/c1-9-7-5-3-2-4-6(7)8/h2-5H,8H2,1H3
- SMILES: Nc1ccccc1OC

Properties
Chemical formula	C_{7}H_{9}NO
Molar mass	123.155 g·mol^{−1}
Appearance	Yellow liquid, turns brown upon exposure to air
Density	1.0923 g/cm^{3}
Melting point	6.2 °C (43.2 °F; 279.3 K)
Boiling point	224 °C (435 °F; 497 K)
Solubility in water	1.5 g/100 ml
Solubility	soluble in ethanol, diethyl ether, acetone, benzene
Magnetic susceptibility (χ)	−80.44·10^{−6} cm^{3}/mol

Hazards
- Occupational safety and health (OHS/OSH)
Main hazards	potential occupational carcinogen
- GHS labelling
Pictograms	(GHS06: Toxic) (GHS08: Health hazard)
Signal word	Danger
Hazard statements	H301, H311, H331, H341, H350
Precautionary statements	P201, P202, P261, P264, P270, P271, P280, P281, P301+P310, P302+P352, P304+P340, P308+P313, P311, P312, P321, P322, P330, P361, P363, P403+P233, P405, P501
NFPA 704 (fire diamond)	2 1 0
Flash point	118 °C (244 °F; 391 K) (open cup)
Autoignition temperature	415 °C (779 °F; 688 K)
- Lethal dose or concentration (LD, LC)
LD_{50} (median dose)	2000 mg/kg (rat, oral); 1400 mg/kg (mouse, oral); 870 mg/kg (rabbit, oral)
- NIOSH (US health exposure limits)
PEL (Permissible)	TWA 0.5 mg/m^{3} [skin]
REL (Recommended)	: Ca TWA 0.5 mg/m^{3} [skin]
IDLH (Immediate danger)	50 mg/m^{3}

Related compounds
Related compounds	m-Anisidine p-Anisidine
- Except where otherwise noted, data are given for materials in their standard state (at 25 °C [77 °F], 100 kPa). verify (what is ?) Infobox references

o-Anisidine (2-anisidine) is an organic compound with the formula CH_{3}OC_{6}H_{4}NH_{2}. A colorless liquid, commercial samples can appear yellow owing to air oxidation. It is one of three isomers of the methoxy-containing aniline derivative. It is a building block for other more complex compounds.

== Production and use ==
It is prepared via methanolysis of 2-chloronitrobenzene:

NaOCH_{3} + ClC_{6}H_{4}NO_{2} → CH_{3}OC_{6}H_{4}NO_{2} + NaCl

The resulting o-nitroanisole is reduced to o-anisidine.

o-Anisidine is used in the manufacture of dyes. It is nitrated to give 4-nitroanisidine. It is also a precursor to o-dianisidine.

One special use is as a heartwood indicator. An acid solution of o-anisidine is diazotized by adding a sodium nitrite solution. This mixture is applied to the wood and by reaction with polyphenols in the heartwood a reddish brown azo dye is formed.

Direct Blue 15 is an azo dye produced from o-anisidine

== Safety and environmental aspects ==
o-Anisidine is a dangerous pollutant from the production of dyes. It is listed as RCRA hazardous waste, with the code K181. The International Agency for Research on Cancer (IARC) has classified o-anisidine as a Group 2B, possible human carcinogen.
