= M-Anisidine =

m-Anisidine

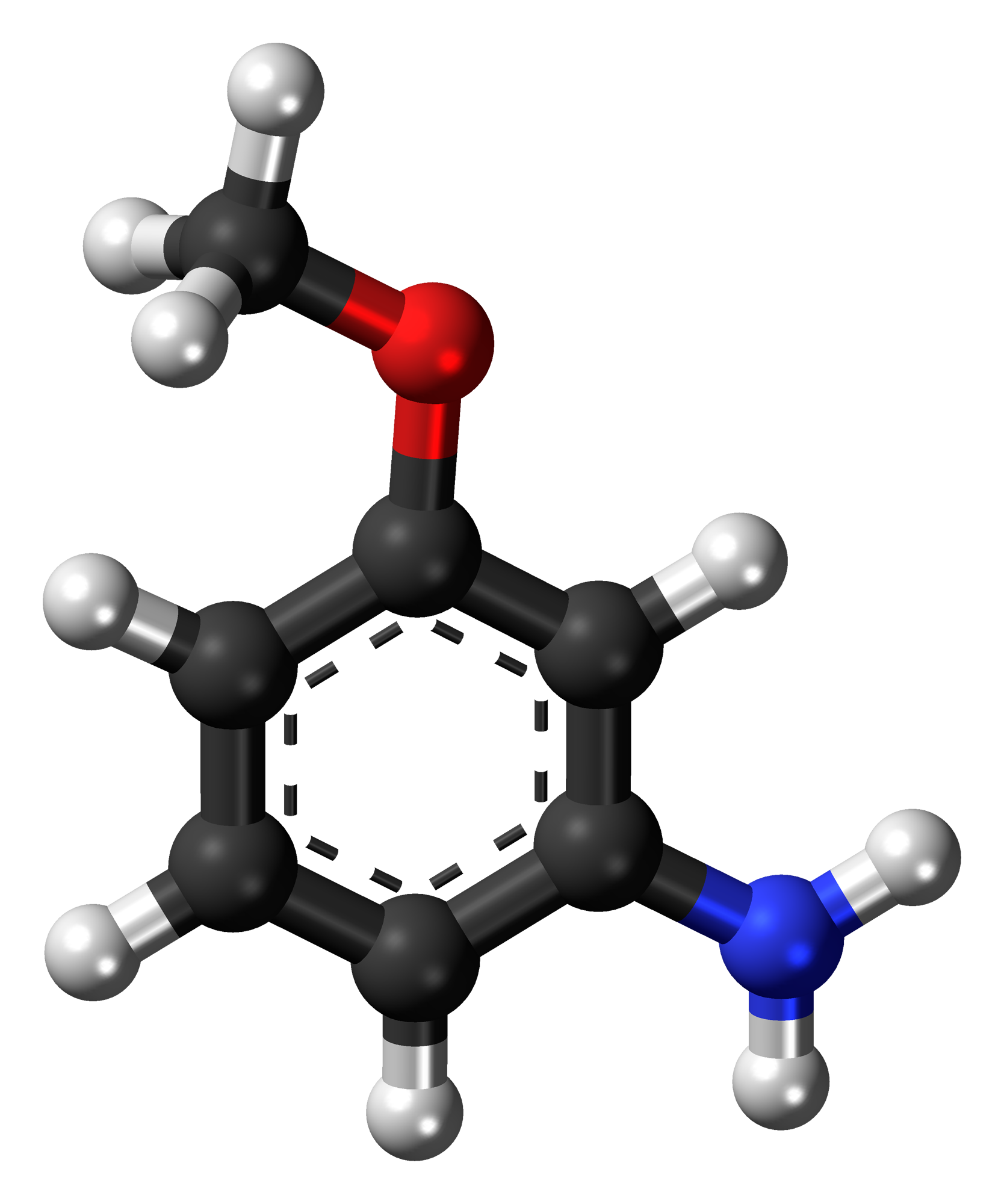

Names
- Preferred IUPAC name 3-Methoxyaniline
- Other names meta-Anisidine; 3-Anisidine

Identifiers
CAS Number	536-90-3
3D model (JSmol)	Interactive image
ChEMBL	ChEMBL1500995
ChemSpider	13869480
ECHA InfoCard	100.007.867
EC Number	208-651-4
PubChem CID	10824
RTECS number	BZ5408000
UNII	JXA144KX2I
UN number	2431
CompTox Dashboard (EPA)	DTXSID8024529
- InChI: InChI=1S/C7H9NO/c1-9-7-4-2-3-6(8)5-7/h2-5H,8H2,1H3 Key: NCBZRJODKRCREW-UHFFFAOYSA-N; InChI=1/C7H9NO/c1-9-7-4-2-3-6(8)5-7/h2-5H,8H2,1H3
- SMILES: Nc1cccc(OC)c1

Properties
Chemical formula	C_{7}H_{9}NO
Molar mass	123.155 g·mol^{−1}
Appearance	Pale yellow oily liquid
Density	1.096 (20 °C)
Melting point	< 0 °C (32 °F; 273 K)
Boiling point	251 °C (484 °F; 524 K)
Solubility	Soluble in ethanol, diethyl ether, acetone, benzene
Magnetic susceptibility (χ)	−79.95·10^{−6} cm^{3}/mol
Refractive index (n_{D})	1.5794

Hazards
- GHS labelling
Pictograms	(GHS06: Toxic) (GHS07: Exclamation mark) (GHS09: Environmental hazard)
Signal word	Danger
Hazard statements	H302, H311, H315, H319, H335, H410
Precautionary statements	P261, P264, P270, P271, P273, P280, P301+P312, P302+P352, P304+P340, P305+P351+P338, P312, P321, P322, P330, P332+P313, P337+P313, P361, P362, P363, P391, P403+P233, P405, P501
Flash point	> 122 °C (252 °F; 395 K)
Autoignition temperature	515 °C (959 °F; 788 K)

Related compounds
Related compounds	o-Anisidine p-Anisidine
- Except where otherwise noted, data are given for materials in their standard state (at 25 °C [77 °F], 100 kPa). verify (what is ?) Infobox references

m-Anisidine is an organic compound with the formula CH_{3}OC_{6}H_{4}NH_{2}. A clear light yellow or amber color liquid, commercial samples can appear brown owing to air oxidation. It is one of three isomers of the methoxy-containing aniline derivative.
