= Carcinogen =

Agent directly involved in causing cancer

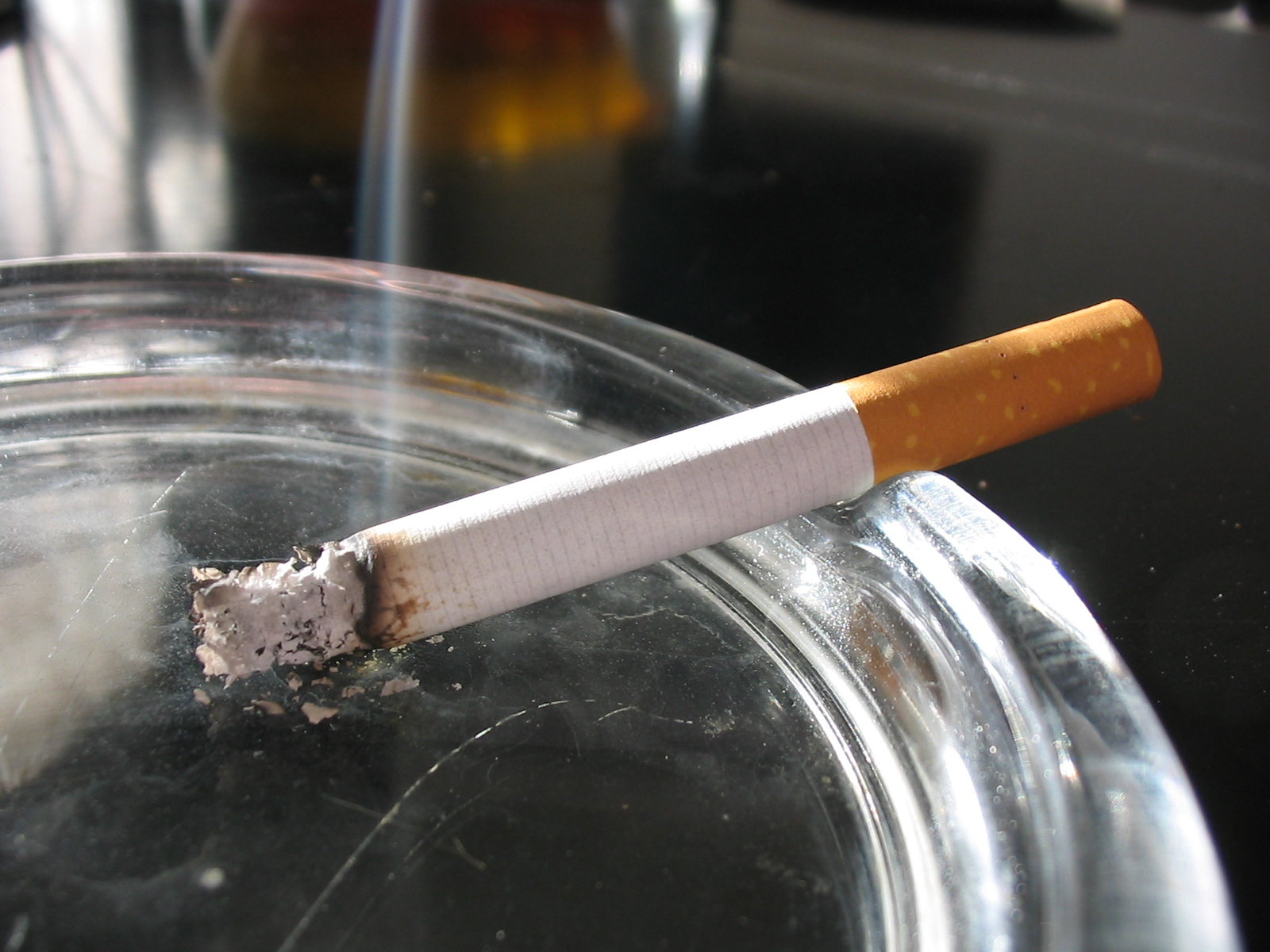
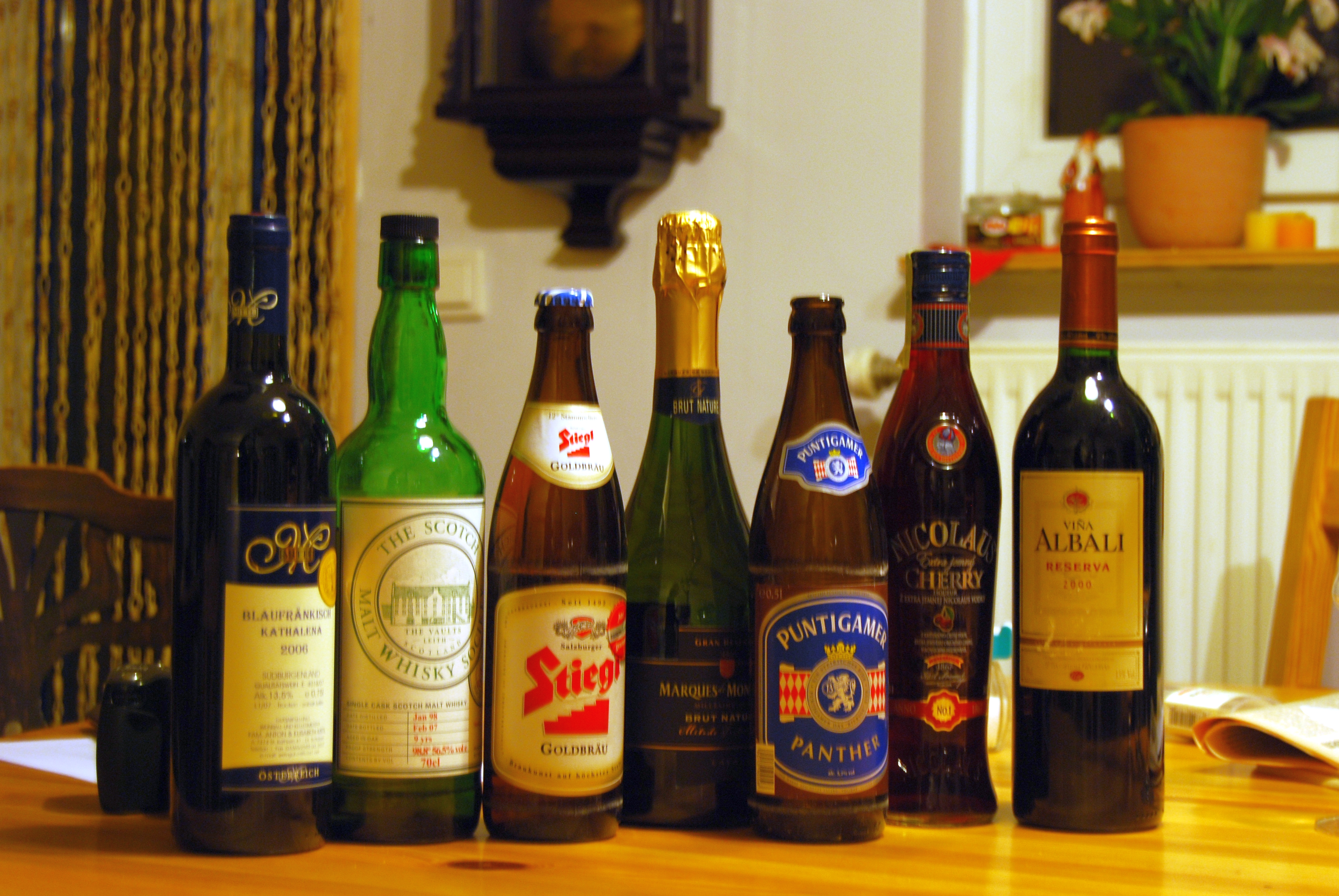
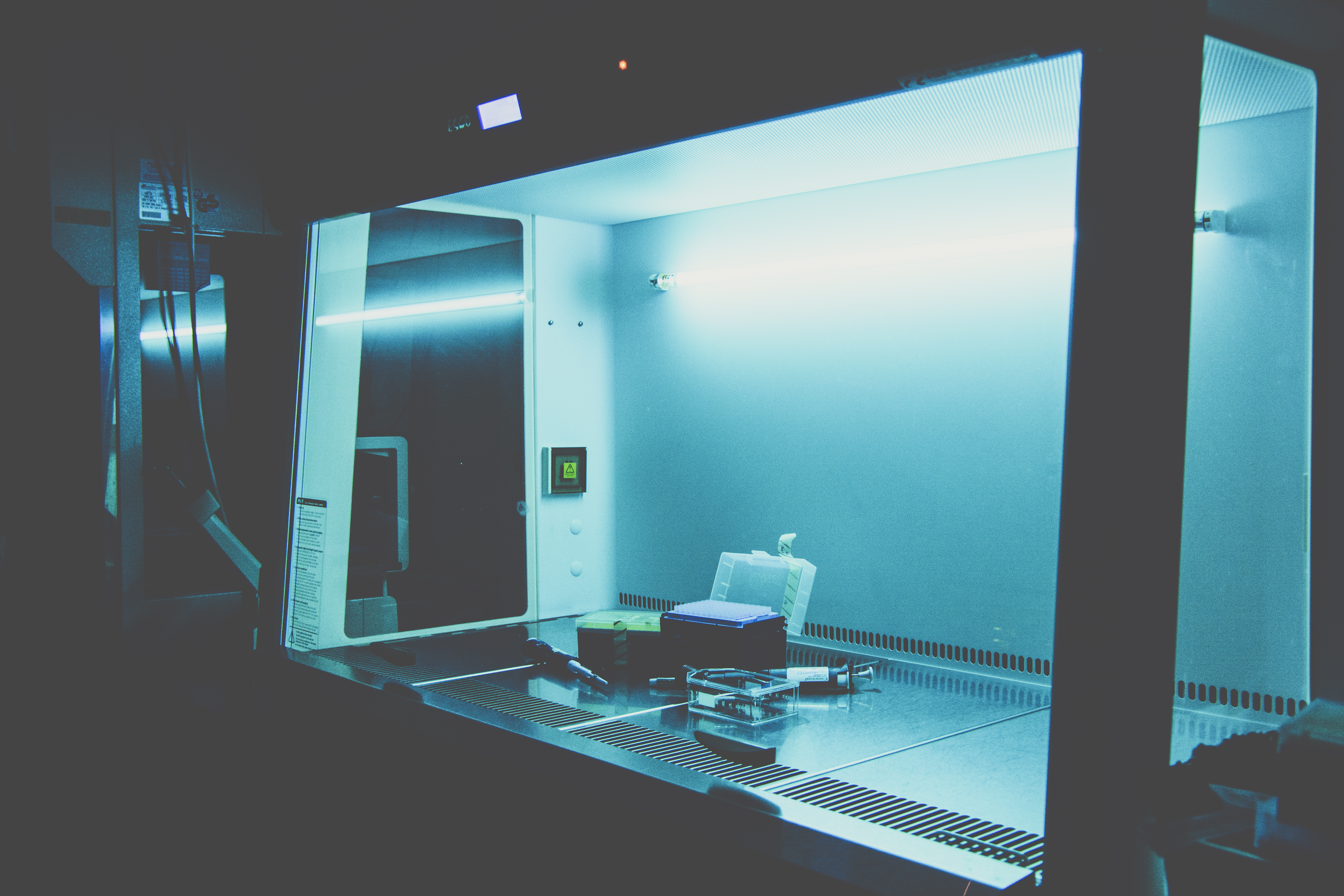
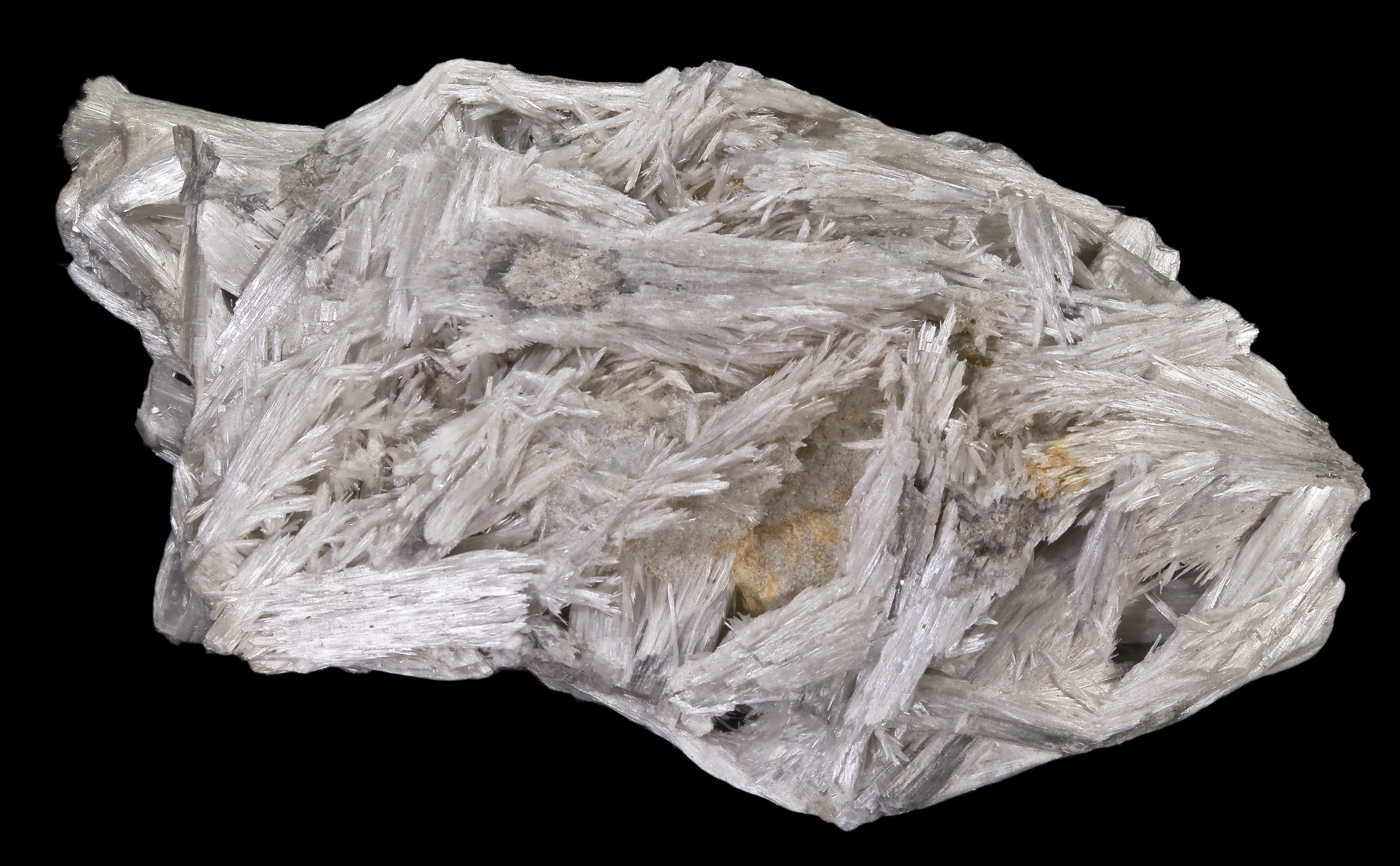
Common carcinogens; clockwise from top left: tobacco smoking, alcohol, asbestos, ultraviolet B and C radiation

A carcinogen (/kɑːr.ˈsɪn.ə.dʒən/) is any agent that promotes the development of cancer. Carcinogens can include synthetic chemicals, naturally occurring substances, physical agents such as ionizing and non-ionizing radiation, and biologic agents such as viruses and bacteria. Most carcinogens act by creating mutations in DNA that disrupt a cell's normal processes for regulating growth, leading to uncontrolled cellular proliferation. This occurs when the cell's DNA repair processes fail to identify DNA damage, allowing the defect to be passed down to daughter cells. The damage accumulates over time. This is typically a multi-step process during which the regulatory mechanisms within the cell are gradually dismantled allowing for unchecked cellular division.

The specific mechanisms for carcinogenic activity are unique to each agent and cell type. Carcinogenic agents can be broadly categorized, however, as either activation-dependent or activation-independent, which relate to the agent's ability to engage directly with DNA. Activation-dependent agents are relatively inert in their original form, but are bioactivated in the body into metabolites or intermediaries capable of damaging human DNA. These are also known as "indirect-acting" carcinogens. Examples of activation-dependent carcinogens include polycyclic aromatic hydrocarbons (PAHs), heterocyclic aromatic amines, and mycotoxins.

Activation-independent carcinogens, or "direct-acting" carcinogens, are those that are capable of directly damaging DNA without any modification to their molecular structure. These agents typically include electrophilic groups that react readily with the net negative charge of DNA molecules. Examples of activation-independent carcinogens include ultraviolet light, ionizing radiation and alkylating agents.

The time from exposure to a carcinogen to the development of cancer is known as the latency period. For most solid tumors in humans, the latency period is between 10 and 40 years depending on cancer type. For blood cancers, the latency period may be as short as two. Due to prolonged latency periods identification of carcinogens can be challenging.

A number of organizations review and evaluate the cumulative scientific evidence regarding the potential carcinogenicity of specific substances. Foremost among these is the International Agency for Research on Cancer (IARC). IARC routinely publishes monographs in which specific substances are evaluated for their potential carcinogenicity to humans and subsequently categorized into one of four groupings: Group 1: Carcinogenic to humans, Group 2A: Probably carcinogenic to humans, Group 2B: Possibly carcinogenic to humans and Group 3: Not classifiable as to its carcinogenicity to humans. Other organizations that evaluate the carcinogenicity of substances include the National Toxicology Program of the US Public Health Service, NIOSH, the American Conference of Governmental Industrial Hygienists and others.

There are numerous sources of exposures to carcinogens including ultraviolet radiation from the sun, radon gas emitted in residential basements, environmental contaminants such as chlordecone, cigarette smoke and ingestion of some types of foods such as alcohol and processed meats. Occupational exposures represent a major source of carcinogens with an estimated 666,000 annual fatalities worldwide attributable to work related cancers. According to NIOSH, 3-6% of cancers worldwide are due to occupational exposures. Well established occupational carcinogens include vinyl chloride and hemangiosarcoma of the liver, benzene and leukemia, aniline dyes and bladder cancer, asbestos and mesothelioma, polycyclic aromatic hydrocarbons and scrotal cancer among chimney sweeps to name a few.

== Radiation ==
=== Ionizing Radiation ===
CERCLA identifies all radionuclides as carcinogens, although the nature of the emitted radiation (alpha, beta, gamma, or neutron and the radioactive strength), its consequent capacity to cause ionization in tissues, and the magnitude of radiation exposure, determine the potential hazard. Carcinogenicity of radiation depends on the type of radiation, type of exposure, and penetration. For example, alpha radiation has low penetration and is not a hazard outside the body, but emitters are carcinogenic when inhaled or ingested. For example, Thorotrast, a (incidentally radioactive) suspension previously used as a contrast medium in x-ray diagnostics, is a potent human carcinogen known because of its retention within various organs and persistent emission of alpha particles. Low-level ionizing radiation may induce irreparable DNA damage (leading to replicational and transcriptional errors needed for neoplasia or may trigger viral interactions) leading to pre-mature aging and cancer.

=== Non-ionizing radiation ===
Not all types of electromagnetic radiation are carcinogenic. Low-energy waves on the electromagnetic spectrum including radio waves, microwaves, infrared radiation and visible light are thought not to be, because they have insufficient energy to break chemical bonds. Evidence for carcinogenic effects of non-ionizing radiation is generally inconclusive, though there are some documented cases of radar technicians with prolonged high exposure experiencing significantly higher cancer incidence.

Higher-energy radiation, including ultraviolet radiation (present in sunlight), generally is carcinogenic if received in sufficient doses. For most people, ultraviolet radiations from sunlight is the most common cause of skin cancer. In Australia, where people with pale skin are often exposed to strong sunlight, melanoma is the most common cancer diagnosed in people aged 15–44 years.

Substances or foods irradiated with electrons or electromagnetic radiation (such as microwave, X-ray or gamma) are not carcinogenic. In contrast, non-electromagnetic neutron radiation produced inside nuclear reactors can produce secondary radiation through nuclear transmutation.

== Common carcinogens associated with food ==
=== Alcohol ===
Alcohol is a carcinogen of the head and neck, esophagus, liver, colon and rectum, and breast. It has a synergistic effect with tobacco smoke in the development of head and neck cancers. In the United States approximately 6% of cancers and 4% of cancer deaths are attributable to alcohol use.

=== Processed meats ===
Chemicals used in processed and cured meat such as some brands of bacon, sausages and ham may produce carcinogens. For example, nitrites used as food preservatives in cured meat such as bacon have also been noted as being carcinogenic with demographic links, but not causation, to colon cancer.

=== Meats cooked at high temperatures ===
Cooking food at high temperatures, for example grilling or barbecuing meats, may also lead to the formation of minute quantities of many potent carcinogens that are comparable to those found in cigarette smoke (i.e., benzo[a]pyrene). Charring of food looks like coking and tobacco pyrolysis, and produces carcinogens. There are several carcinogenic pyrolysis products, such as polynuclear aromatic hydrocarbons, which are converted by human enzymes into epoxides, which attach permanently to DNA. Pre-cooking meats in a microwave oven for 2–3 minutes before grilling shortens the time on the hot pan, and removes heterocyclic amine (HCA) precursors, which can help minimize the formation of these carcinogens.

=== Acrylamide in foods ===
Burnt Hot Dog

Frying, grilling or broiling food at high temperatures, especially starchy foods, until a toasted crust is formed generates acrylamides. This discovery in 2002 led to international health concerns. Subsequent research has however found that it is not likely that the acrylamides in burnt or well-cooked food cause cancer in humans; Cancer Research UK categorizes the idea that burnt food causes cancer as a "myth".

== Biologic agents ==
Several biologic agents are known carcinogens.

Aflatoxin B_{1}, a toxin produced by the fungus Aspergillus flavus which is a common contaminant of stored grains and nuts, is a known cause of hepatocellular cancer. The bacteria H. pylori is known to cause stomach cancer and MALT lymphoma. Hepatitis B and C are associated with the development of hepatocellular cancer. HPV is the primary cause of cervical cancer.

== Cigarette smoke ==
Tobacco smoke contains at least 70 known carcinogens and is implicated in the development of numerous types of cancers including cancers of the lung, larynx, esophagus, stomach, kidney, pancreas, liver, bladder, cervix, colon, rectum and blood. Potent carcinogens found in cigarette smoke include polycyclic aromatic hydrocarbons (PAH, such as benzo(a)pyrene), benzene, and nitrosamine.

== Occupational carcinogens ==
Given that populations of workers are more likely to have consistent, often high level exposures to chemicals rarely encountered in normal life, much of the evidence for the carcinogenicity of specific agents is derived from studies of workers.

Selected carcinogens
Carcinogen	Associated cancer sites or types	Occupational uses or sources
Arsenic and its compounds	Lung; Skin; Hemangiosarcoma	Smelting byproduct; Component of: Alloys; Electrical and semiconductor devices; Medications (e.g. melarsoprol); Herbicides; Fungicides; Animal dips; Drinking water from contaminated aquifers.
Asbestos	Lungs; Asbestosis; Gastrointestinal tract; Pleural mesothelioma; Peritoneal mesothelioma	Not in widespread use, but found in: Constructions; Roofing papers; Floor tiles; Fire-resistant textiles; Friction linings (brake pads) (only outside Europe); Replacement friction linings for automobiles still may contain asbestos
Benzene	Leukemia; Hodgkin's lymphoma	Light fuel oil; Former use as solvent; commodity chemical
Beryllium and its compounds	Lung	Lightweight alloys; Aerospace applications; Nuclear reactors
Cadmium and its compounds	Prostate	Yellow pigments; Phosphors; Solders; Batteries; Metal paintings and coatings
Hexavalent chromium(VI) compounds	Lung	Paints; Pigments; Preservatives
Nitrosamines	Lung; Esophagus; Liver	cigarette smoke; nitrite-treated foods (cured meats)
Ethylene oxide	Leukemia	commodity chemical; Sterilant for hospital equipment
Nickel	Nose; Lung	Nickel plating; Ferrous alloys; Ceramics; Batteries; Stainless-steel welding byproduct
Radon and its decay products	Lung	Uranium decay; Quarries and mines; Cellars and poorly ventilated places
Vinyl chloride	Hemangiosarcoma; Liver	Production of polyvinyl chloride
Shift work that involves circadian disruption	Breast	
Involuntary smoking (Passive smoking)	Lung	
Radium-226, Radium-224, Plutonium-238, Plutonium-239 and other alpha particle emitters with high atomic weight	Bone (they are bone seekers); Liver	Nuclear fuel processing; Radium dial manufacturing
Unless otherwise specified, ref is:

=== Others ===
- Gasoline (contains aromatics)
- Lead and its compounds
- Alkylating antineoplastic agents (e.g., mechlorethamine)
- Styrene
- Other alkylating agents (e.g., dimethyl sulfate)
- Ultraviolet radiation from the sun and UV lamps
- Other ionizing radiation (X-rays, gamma rays, etc.)
- Low refining or unrefined mineral oils

== Mechanisms of carcinogenicity ==
Carcinogens can be classified as genotoxic or nongenotoxic. Genotoxins cause irreversible genetic damage or mutations by binding to DNA. Genotoxins include chemical agents like N-nitroso-N-methylurea (NMU) or non-chemical agents such as ultraviolet light and ionizing radiation. Certain viruses can also act as carcinogens by interacting with DNA.

Nongenotoxins do not directly affect DNA but act in other ways to promote growth. These include hormones and some organic compounds.

== Classification ==
Approximate equivalences between classification schemes
IARC	GHS	NTP	ACGIH	EU
Group 1	Cat. 1A	Known	A1	Cat. 1A
Group 2A	Cat. 1B	Reasonably suspected	A2	Cat. 1B
Group 2B	Cat. 1B	Reasonably suspected	A2	Cat. 1B
Group 2B	Cat. 2		A3	Cat. 2
Group 3	Cat. 2		A3	Cat. 2
Group 3			A4	
Group 4			A5	

=== International Agency for Research on Cancer ===
The International Agency for Research on Cancer (IARC) is an intergovernmental agency established in 1965, which forms part of the World Health Organization of the United Nations. It is based in Lyon, France. Since 1971 it has published a series of Monographs on the Evaluation of Carcinogenic Risks to Humans that have been highly influential in the classification of possible carcinogens.

- Group 1: the agent (mixture) is carcinogenic to humans. The exposure circumstance entails exposures that are carcinogenic to humans.
- Group 2A: the agent (mixture) is most likely (product more likely to be) carcinogenic to humans. The exposure circumstance entails exposures that are probably carcinogenic to humans.
- Group 2B: the agent (mixture) is possibly (chance of product being) carcinogenic to humans. The exposure circumstance entails exposures that are possibly carcinogenic to humans.
- Group 3: the agent (mixture or exposure circumstance) is not classifiable as to its carcinogenicity to humans.
- Group 4: the agent (mixture) is most likely not carcinogenic to humans.

=== Globally Harmonized System ===
The Globally Harmonized System of Classification and Labelling of Chemicals (GHS) is a United Nations initiative to attempt to harmonize the different systems of assessing chemical risk which currently exist (as of March 2009) around the world. It classifies carcinogens into two categories, of which the first may be divided again into subcategories if so desired by the competent regulatory authority:

- Category 1: known or presumed to have carcinogenic potential for humans
  - Category 1A: the assessment is based primarily on human evidence
  - Category 1B: the assessment is based primarily on animal evidence
- Category 2: suspected human carcinogens

=== U.S. National Toxicology Program ===
The National Toxicology Program of the U.S. Department of Health and Human Services is mandated to produce a biennial Report on Carcinogens. As of August 2024, the latest edition was the 15th report (2021). It classifies carcinogens into two groups:

- Known to be a human carcinogen
- Reasonably anticipated to be a human carcinogen

=== American Conference of Governmental Industrial Hygienists ===
The American Conference of Governmental Industrial Hygienists (ACGIH) is a private organization best known for its publication of threshold limit values (TLVs) for occupational exposure and monographs on workplace chemical hazards. It assesses carcinogenicity as part of a wider assessment of the occupational hazards of chemicals.

- Group A1: Confirmed human carcinogen
- Group A2: Suspected human carcinogen
- Group A3: Confirmed animal carcinogen with unknown relevance to humans
- Group A4: Not classifiable as a human carcinogen
- Group A5: Not suspected as a human carcinogen

=== European Union ===
The European Union classification of carcinogens is contained in the Regulation (EC) No 1272/2008. It consists of three categories:

- Category 1A: Carcinogenic
- Category 1B: May cause cancer
- Category 2: Suspected of causing cancer

The former European Union classification of carcinogens was contained in the Dangerous Substances Directive and the Dangerous Preparations Directive. It also consisted of three categories:

- Category 1: Substances known to be carcinogenic to humans.
- Category 2: Substances which should be regarded as if they are carcinogenic to humans.
- Category 3: Substances which cause concern for humans, owing to possible carcinogenic effects but in respect of which the available information is not adequate for making a satisfactory assessment.

This assessment scheme is being phased out in favor of the GHS scheme (see above), to which it is very close in category definitions.

=== Safe Work Australia ===
Under a previous name, the NOHSC, in 1999 Safe Work Australia published the Approved Criteria for Classifying Hazardous Substances [NOHSC:1008(1999)]. Section 4.76 of this document outlines the criteria for classifying carcinogens as approved by the Australian government. This classification consists of three categories:

- Category 1: Substances known to be carcinogenic to humans.
- Category 2: Substances that should be regarded as if they were carcinogenic to humans.
- Category 3: Substances that have possible carcinogenic effects in humans but about which there is insufficient information to make an assessment.

== Major carcinogens implicated in the four most common cancers worldwide ==
In this section, the carcinogens implicated as the main causative agents of the four most common cancers worldwide are briefly described. These four cancers are lung, breast, colon, and stomach cancers. Together they account for about 41% of worldwide cancer incidence and 42% of cancer deaths (for more detailed information on the carcinogens implicated in these and other cancers, see references).

=== Lung cancer ===
Lung cancer (pulmonary carcinoma) is the most common cancer in the world, both in terms of cases (1.6 million cases; 12.7% of total cancer cases) and deaths (1.4 million deaths; 18.2% of total cancer deaths). Lung cancer is largely caused by tobacco smoke. Risk estimates for lung cancer in the United States indicate that tobacco smoke is responsible for 90% of lung cancers. Other factors are implicated in lung cancer, and these factors can interact synergistically with smoking so that total attributable risk adds up to more than 100%. These factors include occupational exposure to carcinogens (about 9-15%), radon (10%) and outdoor air pollution (1-2%).

Tobacco smoke is a complex mixture of more than 5,300 identified chemicals. The most important carcinogens in tobacco smoke have been determined by a "Margin of Exposure" approach. Using this approach, the most important tumorigenic compounds in tobacco smoke were, in order of importance, acrolein, formaldehyde, acrylonitrile, 1,3-butadiene, cadmium, acetaldehyde, ethylene oxide, and isoprene. Most of these compounds cause DNA damage by forming DNA adducts or by inducing other alterations in DNA. DNA damages are subject to error-prone DNA repair or can cause replication errors. Such errors in repair or replication can result in mutations in tumor suppressor genes or oncogenes leading to cancer.

=== Breast cancer ===
Breast cancer is the second most common cancer [(1.4 million cases, 10.9%), but ranks 5th as cause of death (458,000, 6.1%)]. Increased risk of breast cancer is associated with persistently elevated blood levels of estrogen. Estrogen appears to contribute to breast carcinogenesis by three processes; (1) the metabolism of estrogen to genotoxic, mutagenic carcinogens, (2) the stimulation of tissue growth, and (3) the repression of phase II detoxification enzymes that metabolize ROS leading to increased oxidative DNA damage.

The major estrogen in humans, estradiol, can be metabolized to quinone derivatives that form adducts with DNA. These derivatives can cause depurination, the removal of bases from the phosphodiester backbone of DNA, followed by inaccurate repair or replication of the apurinic site leading to mutation and eventually cancer. This genotoxic mechanism may interact in synergy with estrogen receptor-mediated, persistent cell proliferation to ultimately cause breast cancer. Genetic background, dietary practices and environmental factors also likely contribute to the incidence of DNA damage and breast cancer risk.

Consumption of alcohol has also been linked to an increased risk for breast cancer.

=== Colon cancer ===
Colorectal cancer is the third most common cancer [1.2 million cases (9.4%), 608,000 deaths (8.0%)]. Tobacco smoke may be responsible for up to 20% of colorectal cancers in the United States. In addition, substantial evidence implicates bile acids as an important factor in colon cancer. Twelve studies (summarized in Bernstein et al.) indicate that the bile acids deoxycholic acid (DCA) or lithocholic acid (LCA) induce production of DNA-damaging reactive oxygen species or reactive nitrogen species in human or animal colon cells. Furthermore, 14 studies showed that DCA and LCA induce DNA damage in colon cells. Also, 27 studies reported that bile acids cause apoptosis.

Increased apoptosis can result in selective survival of cells that are resistant to induction of apoptosis. Colon cells with reduced ability to undergo apoptosis in response to DNA damage would tend to accumulate mutations, and such cells may give rise to colon cancer. Epidemiologic studies have found that fecal bile acid concentrations are increased in populations with a high incidence of colon cancer. Dietary increases in total fat or saturated fat result in elevated DCA and LCA in feces and elevated exposure of the colon epithelium to these bile acids. When the bile acid DCA was added to the standard diet of wild-type mice invasive colon cancer was induced in 56% of the mice after 8 to 10 months. Overall, the available evidence indicates that DCA and LCA are centrally important DNA-damaging carcinogens in colon cancer.

=== Stomach cancer ===
Stomach cancer is the fourth most common cancer [990,000 cases (7.8%), 738,000 deaths (9.7%)]. Helicobacter pylori infection is the main causative factor in stomach cancer. Chronic gastritis (inflammation) caused by H. pylori is often long-standing if not treated. Infection of gastric epithelial cells with H. pylori results in increased production of reactive oxygen species (ROS). ROS cause oxidative DNA damage including the major base alteration 8-hydroxydeoxyguanosine (8-OHdG). 8-OHdG resulting from ROS is increased in chronic gastritis. The altered DNA base can cause errors during DNA replication that have mutagenic and carcinogenic potential. Thus H. pylori-induced ROS appear to be the major carcinogens in stomach cancer because they cause oxidative DNA damage leading to carcinogenic mutations.

Diet is also thought to be a contributing factor in stomach cancer: in Japan, where very salty pickled foods are popular, the incidence of stomach cancer is high. Preserved meat such as bacon, sausages, and ham increases the risk, while a diet rich in fresh fruit, vegetables, peas, beans, grains, nuts, seeds, herbs, and spices will reduce the risk. The risk also increases with age.

== See also ==
- History of cancer
- Mutagen
- Possible carcinogen
- Safe handling of carcinogens
- Teratology
