= Vape shop =

Shop selling vaping products

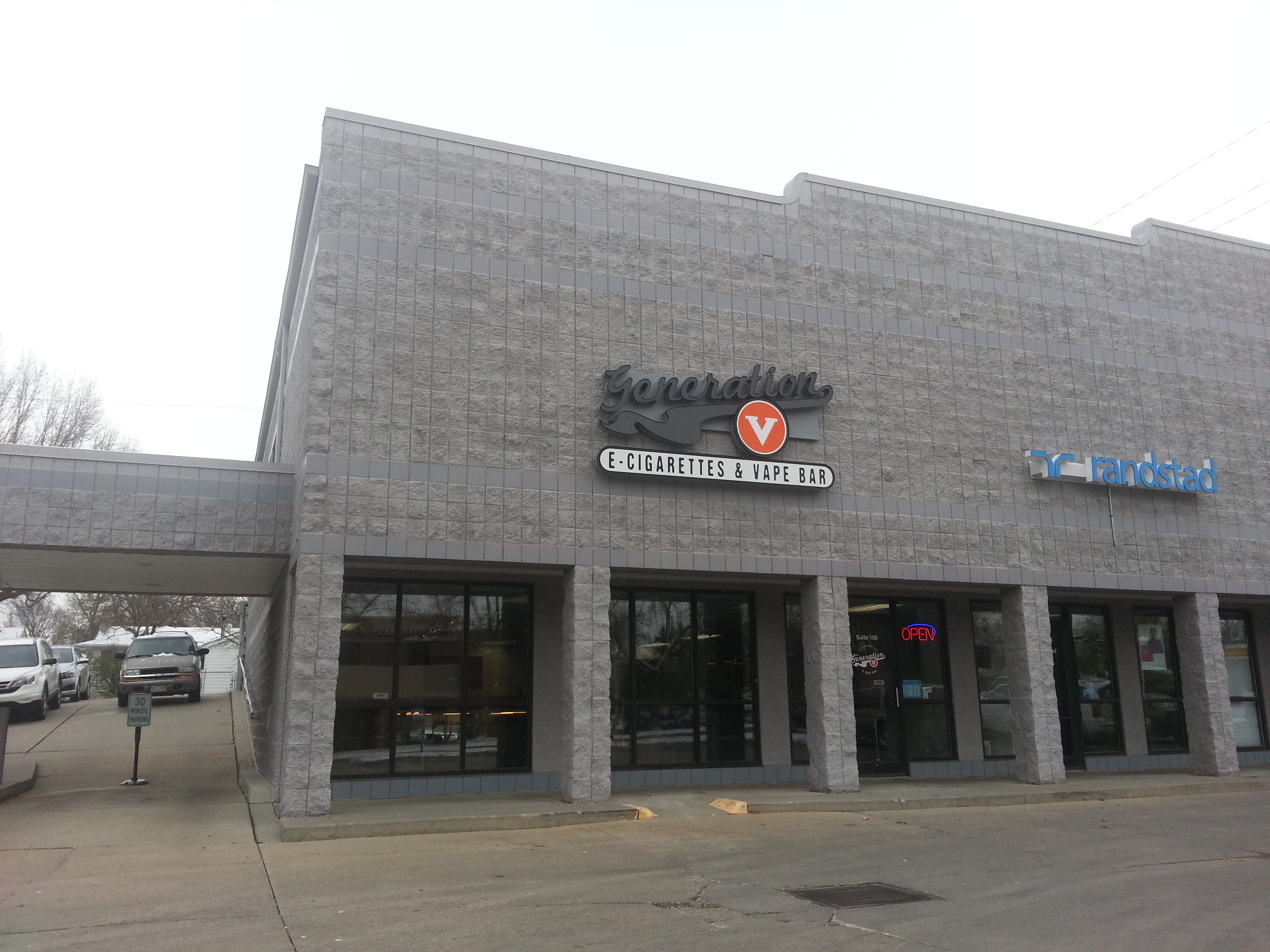
A vape shop in Lincoln, Nebraska, United States

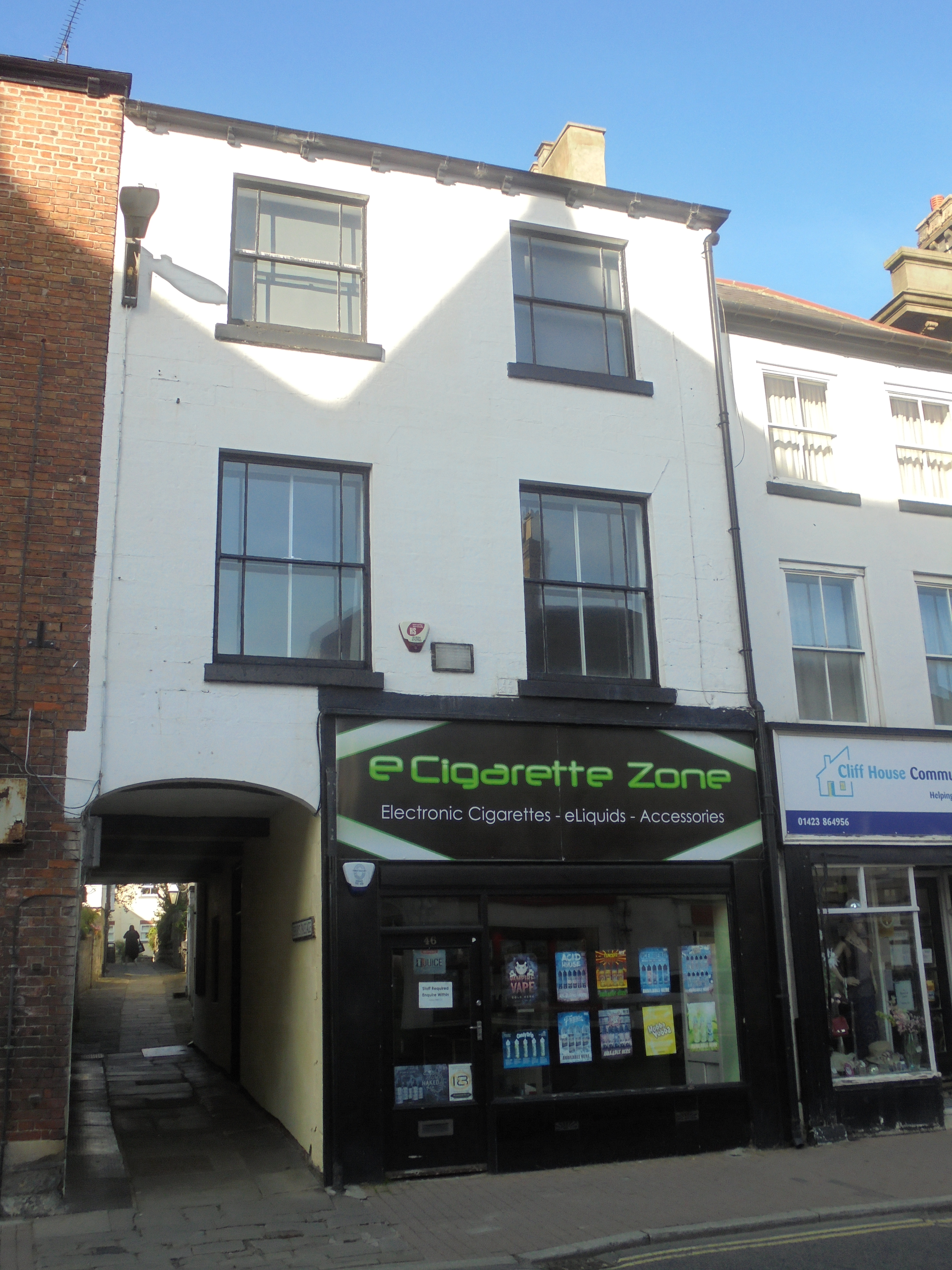
A vape shop in Knaresborough, U.K., 2019

A vape shop (Note: Variously known as a vape bar, vaping bar, vape lounge, vaping lounge, vape outlet, e-cigarette vape store, e-cigarette retailer, ENDS retailer, ENDS vape store, vape store, vapor store, vapor shop, vaping shop, vaping store, electronic cigarette shop, e-cigarette shop, e-cig shop, EC shop, EC lounge, e-cigarette specialty shop, e-cigarette specialty store, electronic cigarette retail outlet, e-cigarette retail outlet, electronic cigarette store, electronic cig store, e-cigarette store, or e-cig store.) is a retail outlet specializing in the selling of vaping products, though shops selling derived psychoactive cannabis products have increased in the United States since the passage of the 2018 Farm Bill. There are also online vape shops. A vape shop offers a range of vaping products. The majority of vape shops do not sell vaping products that are from "Big Tobacco" companies. In 2013, online search engine searches on vape shops surpassed searches on e-cigarettes. Around a third of all sales of vaping products in one US state took place in vape shops. Big Tobacco believes the independent vape market is a threat to their interests.

Effective August 8, 2016, under the Food and Drug Administration (US FDA) rules, a vape shop that mixes or prepares e-liquids, or makes or modifies any kind of vape, is regulated as a tobacco product manufacturer. The US FDA acknowledged that many vape shops will go out of business, but they also state many will stay open, despite hefty costs. Vape shop owner Joe Baba in the US believes a ban on public vaping might put several vape shops out of business because taste-testing would be prohibited. The revised EU Tobacco Products Directive came into effect May 2016 which regulates the sale and marketing of vaping products. Small business owners are concerned that the regulations will make vapes less interesting to consumers and that this means a downturn of their business.

Vape trade shows have an array of product vendors, seminars, social interactions with other vapers, parties, gifts, vaping contests, and other activities. Vape shows are free to attend or have an entrance fee that cost from $10 to $25. In 2014, vaping contests at vape trade shows such as "cloud-chasing" were rare. By 2015, close to 50% of vaping trade show organizations promoted contests such as cloud-chasing. Vape trade shows are increasing in popularity and regularity. Vape shop owners, agents, distributors, and vapers attend trade shows.

== Store ==
=== Selection ===
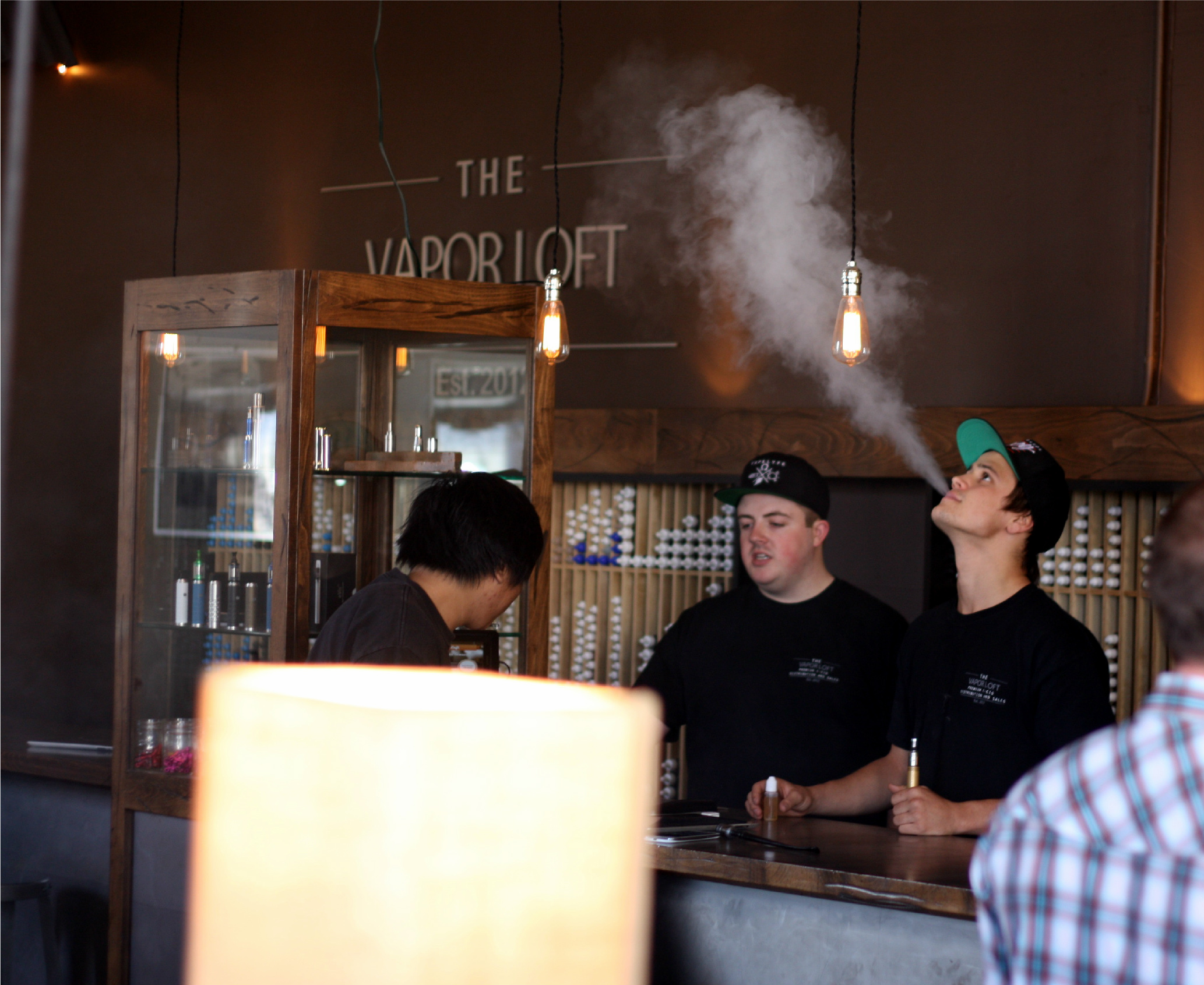
Interior view of a vape shop in Orange, California, United States

As the prevalence of tobacco consumption has increased to include wider use of e-cigarettes, a different kind of retailer has come forth, known as vape shops. A vape shop is a retail outlet focusing in the selling of electronic cigarette products. There are also online vape shops. E-cigarettes products are mainly available online or in dedicated "vape" storefronts. They are also available at grocery stores, coffee shops, conventional retailers, mass merchandisers, mass retailers, tobacco retailers, convenience stores, gas stations, dollar stores, pharmacies (drug stores), liquor stores, shopping malls, and at small kiosks in shopping malls. The major sellers for e-cigarette products are vape shops, supermarkets, online vendors, and tobacco shops.

A vape shop offers a range of e-cigarette products. They do not customarily sell tobacco products. Vape shops generally have an antagonistic relationship with the tobacco industry. The majority of vape shops do not sell e-cigarette products that are from "Big Tobacco" companies. There are numerous vape shops that are not affiliated with the tobacco industry. Big Tobacco believes the independent e-cigarette market is a threat to their interests. The existence of some "vape and smoke" shops are opposed by most of the vape shop industry, based on anecdotal evidence. Retailers specializing in tobacco such as smoke shops and head shops have started selling an assortment of vaping products along with their regular products. These vendors such as smoke shops and head shops are generally opposed by vaping purists and advocacy groups. Brands owned by tobacco companies offered a limited range of e-cigarette products, whereas brands owned by vape shops emphasized a panoply of flavor and nicotine options.

By 2014 all the major multinational tobacco companies had entered the e-cigarette market. They did so either by buying existing e-cigarette companies (including Ruyan, the original Chinese e-cigarette company, which was bought by Imperial Tobacco) or by developing their own products. Although there continue to be independently owned vape shops, from economic and political perspectives the e-cigarette business is now part of the traditional tobacco industry. The smaller operators, who are independent sellers of e-cigarettes (so-called vape shops), are losing market share to the large tobacco companies.

Vape shops can offer a greater selection of e-cigarettes than conventional retailers. While vape shops offer mostly reusable e-cigarettes, cig-a-likes are mostly available at convenience stores. Vape shops often sell later-generation devices different from the cig-a-likes usually sold by tobacco stores. Vape shops offer a diverse assortment of refillable e-cigarettes and more complex tank devices for experienced users.

Vape shops typically offer a diverse selection of e-liquids, while convenience stores offer some e-liquids. Vape shops can buy e-liquids containing 100 mg/mL and dilute them according to the patron's preference. Vape shops offer several kinds of solution strengths. Many vape shops make nicotine e-liquids with a high concentration of nicotine. Some retail stores are also manufacturers that create custom flavors, which increases the variety of flavors available. Flavors such as chocolate, caramel, mint, menthol, coffee, cherry, and apple can be added to the liquid nicotine. Oils and wax for use in reusable vaporizers have been available. The variety of flavored e-liquids available plays a central role in wooing e-cigarette users. Herbs for vaping are also sold. Local vape shops in Wilson County, North Carolina sold e-cigarettes known as Black Magic. After several complaints from concerned parents received by the sheriff's office an investigation uncovered high-school students were buying Black Magic. The North Carolina State Bureau of Investigation tests indicated they contained cannabidiol, or CBD oil, and also synthetic cannabinoids, which are against the law in the state. The Black Magic that were sold at these shops stated on the packaging, "legal in all 50 states." Officials stated they seized numerous Black Magic packages. Inexpensive lithium-ion batteries may be sold at local vape shops. Vape shops may carry vaping magazines and may offer accessories such as clothing, bags, wooden cases for the e-liquid, and vape carrying cases. A handful of vape shops sell antique signs and trinkets to decorate one's home or crafts from regional artists. Many small vape shops are selling e-cigarette products made from China.

=== Design and layout ===
They greatly vary in design and product selection. There are shops that look a bit similar to bars. There are shops that have a lounge where people can drink a beverage as they vape. Vape shops sometimes include a café or other elements that promote socializing, essentially making such places like a lounge. A vape shop in Anderson, CA also sells vaping products via drive-through. A vape shop in Elkton, Maryland also sells beer and food. A vape shop in Ottawa, Illinois provides a socializing area with a sofa and television. There are shops that have a vape bar where patrons can test out different e-liquids and socialize. Vape shops having lounge areas, food and beverage amenities, and entertainment may furnish a social setting for vaping that may entice newbie e-cigarette users and non-smokers alike. Hardly any vape shops have a photo booth. A small number of vape shops offer patrons the opportunity to vape via a hookah. A few vape shops double as art galleries. Vape shop tenants are usually interested in a location between 1,200 and 1,500 square feet.

=== Marketing and events ===
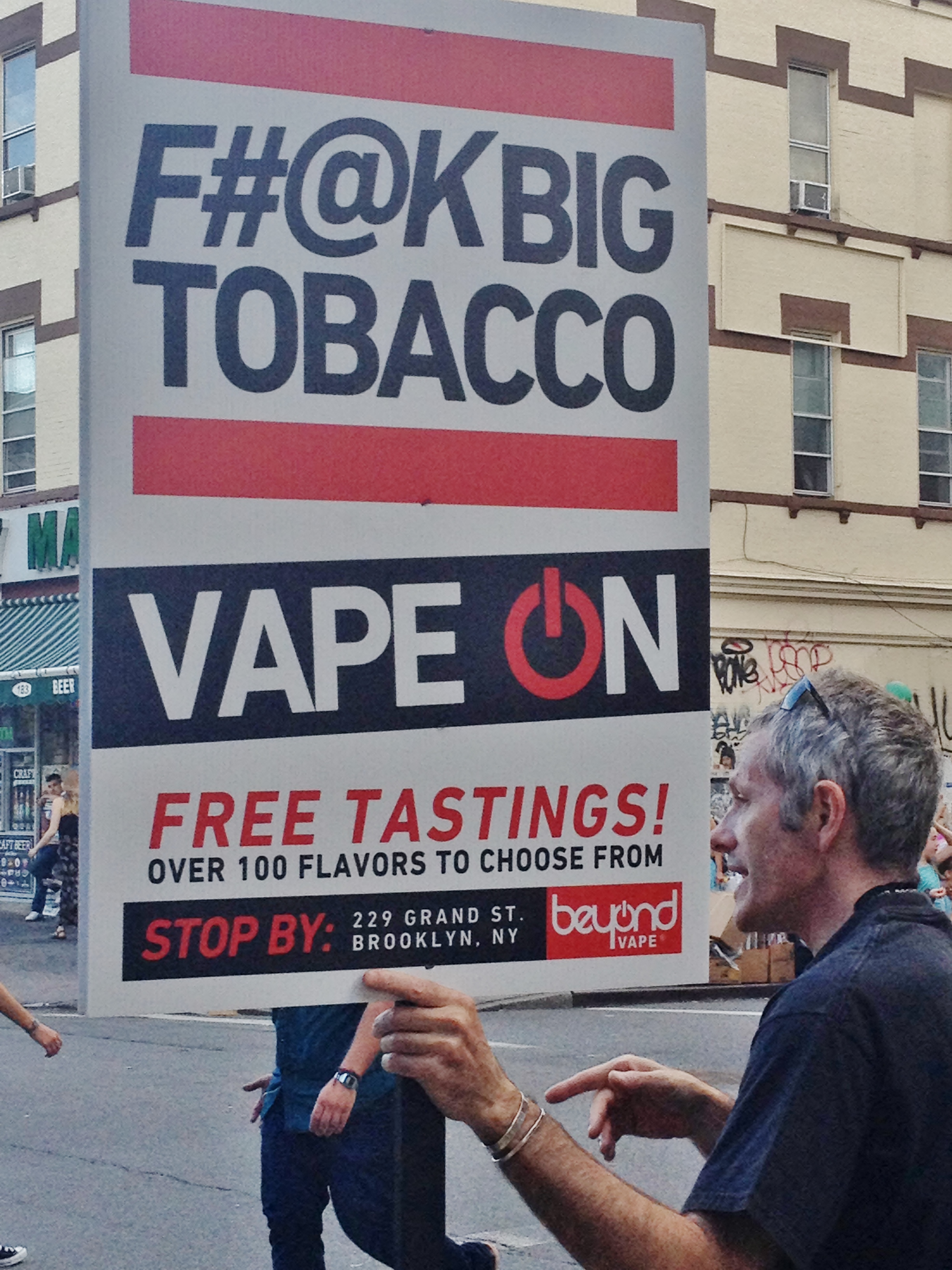
E-cigarette retailer marketing sign in Williamsburg, Brooklyn, New York, United States

Many e-cigarette companies have proposed to retailers the idea to convert part of their current location into a mini vape shop. The markup for traditional cigarettes is 10–20%, but e-cigarette dispensers, nicotine cartridges, and accessories are as high 200–400% markup. US vape shops generate around $26,000 in monthly sales. In San Francisco, e-liquids, not the devices, were the main source of income for vape shops. US vape shop owners intend to capitalize on medical marijuana-related sales. In the UK in 2018, there is increased competition among vape shops because more shops have opened.

"Vape shops intend to make potential customers aware of their existence and curious about visiting a shop and engaging in vaping. They also intend to make the shop accessible to encourage sales of e-cigarette-related products (vaping equipment, e-liquids, and hobby-related items such as t-shirts and magazines). Barker and colleagues interviewed vape shop owners/managers in 37 vape shops and observed availability, price, promotion and placement of vaping products and e-liquids across nine USA cities: Atlanta, Chicago, Henderson, Phoenix, Oklahoma City, San Jose, Seattle, Thousand Oaks, and Ventura. A majority of vape shops primarily use social media outlets (e.g. 100% Facebook, 86% Instagram and Yelp, 65% Twitter, 38% YouTube) and special events open to the community (57%) for marketing. Few stores reported using print or broadcast media, with radio being the most popular venue (19%). About half (51%) of stores had external advertisements, and almost one-third had no signage related to sales to minors," according to a 2017 report.

Vape shops have used the game Pokémon Go to market their products. "From July to October 2016, several vape shops and online retailers have incorporated Pokémon Go as part of promotions on Twitter, linking game performance with discounts on their products," a 2017 report stated. Vape shops have also set up local events to join Pokémon Go activities with vaping promotional contests.

In 2015, "Cloud-chasing", the activity of blowing the largest clouds of vapor, were becoming a routine event at local vape shops. Many vape shops organize cloud-chasing events. Cloud-chasing contests appear to be intended to bring in new shoppers and increase e-cigarette business. Vape shops have held music concerts at night.

Marketing of e-cigarettes by tobacco shops was limited, with most responding that they do not market e-cigarettes, according to a 2018 report. Almost half have used social media, with others relying on word of mouth and price promotions. Vape shops utilized more diverse marketing channels, including radio, print media, and word of mouth. In-store marketing has been increasing, as of 2016. The most common form of marketing by vape shops is social media, which all vape shops cited using for marketing, the 2018 report concluded.

=== Customer experience ===
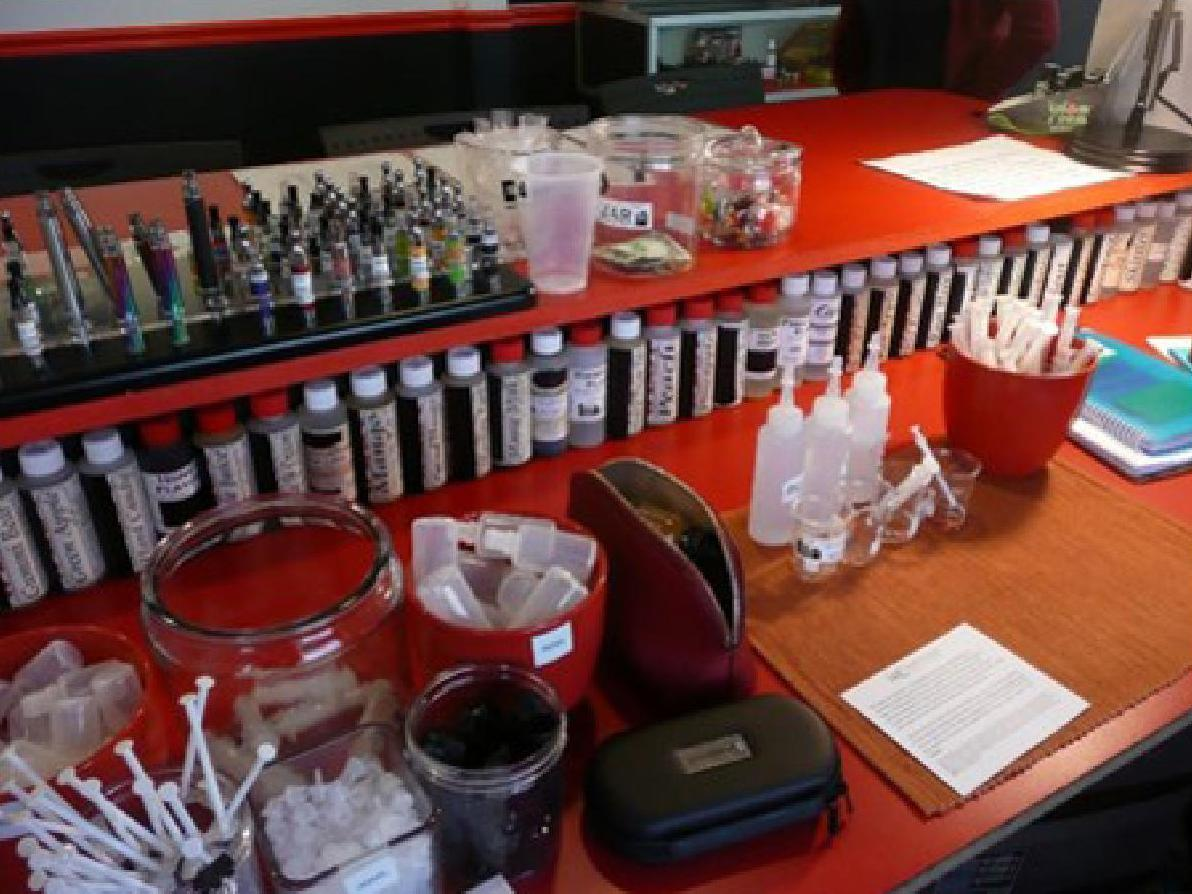
A photo of a juice bar mixing station at a vape shop in January 2016

Most vape shop customers are people who are interested in reducing or quitting smoking. Some are long-term e-cigarette users. Vape shop customers visit their local vape shop for personalized e-cigarette advice. Vape shop retail workers may show potential customers how to use different e-cigarettes and how to fill the devices with e-liquid. A "vapologist" may give advice to potential customers to choosing an e-liquid. Patrons are permitted to vape in most vape shops. Almost all vape shops do not allow smoking.

Some US vape shop owners choose not to sell vaping products to minors. The City Council of Malden, Massachusetts received quite a few complaints following a vape shop opening near the Mystic Valley Regional Charter School. The school board of Howe Sound Secondary School in Squamish, British Columbia is concerned a vape shop could open close to the high school. In June 2017 Christina Moore on behalf of the District of Squamish wrote in an email, "the District has no means to withhold such a business licence if all of our regulatory requirements are met." The vape shop marketed flavored e-cigarettes that appeared to target a younger audience. Pleasantville, New York Board of Education officials in 2017 were concerned over a vape shop opening near schools, learning centers and other locations attended by young people. New Rochelle, New York officials in 2017 proposed regulation to stop smoke and vape shops from selling nicotine-based products within 500 feet of youth-based institutions. "Vape shops in general have received a bad rep for their social element and for allegedly marketing toward children," Chris Bouton, a vape shop owner in Ypsilanti, Michigan, said in 2016. Vape shop owners support prohibiting the sales of e-cigarettes to children. In 2016-2017 in the UK, vape shops were the top destination for buying e-cigarettes among previous-year smokers. A 2016 Smoking, Drinking and Drug Use UK survey found 37% of e-cigarette users of those 11–15 years of age stated they purchased an e-cigarette at a vape shop. About 25% of 11-15 year olds of respondents in a UK survey stated buying e-cigarettes from vape shops, among those who vape and smoke. The top destination to buy e-cigarettes in regular users of those 11–15 years of age was a vape shop, with 24% stating buying them from these shops.

Studies focused on vape shops are limited. A 2018 study of e-cigarette users in the East Anglia region of England found e-cigarette users reported that vape shops were very attentive to their needs related to e-cigarette use. In order to gain a competitive advantage in the marketplace, vape shop owners and managers commonly stated that they distinguish their stores from others through customer service and new products, according to a 2018 report. These findings support previous studies which found vape shops build rapport with customers and create an atmosphere around vaping which allows for interaction, builds a sense of community, and attracts customers. The relational dimension of vape shops may contribute to the spread of information about e-cigarettes including new products, forms of use, and health-related issues. Thus, while the US FDA has required warning labels on products and advertisements, it cannot control what vape shop owners and staff communicate to their customers or where they get information. Vape shops are not only retail outlets where products are made available; they also act as a center of activity for the vape community for information about e-cigarettes.

=== In-store observations ===
Vape shop employees were commonly former smokers who generally were presently e-cigarettes users, and employees shared their thoughts using e-cigarettes and moving away from cigarettes. Michelle LaBarbera, representing the Vapor Group Inc. located in Davie, Florida, said in 2014, "A very big part of employment at a vape shop is not just understanding how the product works and being able to explain it, but also being able to figure out what may be wrong with it." Vape shops occasionally provide inaccurate information. Of the 77 vape shops in the Los Angeles Basin, 50% of the vape shops had let people test e-liquids consisting of nicotine. 83% of the vape shops had self-service testing areas for patrons. The majority of vape shops let patrons to test several kinds of e-liquids. Other retailers do not provide sampling of e-liquids. 72% of vape shop workers stated that spills of e-liquids consisting of nicotine had happened. 64% of the vape shops had safety gear, whereas 34% had gear for appropriate nicotine handling. In addition, 62% of vape shop workers stated they picked up nicotine absent of gloves or other safety protection.

A 2016 study analyzed 23 vape shops in the San Francisco Bay Area offering e-cigarettes and e-liquid. Every retailer sold e-liquid containing no nicotine. 91% had free e-liquid samples. 57% of those having free samples available merely had e-liquid without nicotine available. Many vape shops began charging for samples, such as a $1 fee, that get around the US FDA rules of giving away free samples, based on anecdotal evidence. Every vape shop retailer sold second-generation and third-generation e-cigarettes, and just 17% of vape shops sold first-generation e-cigarettes. Employees said about 72% of their shoppers purchased e-cigarettes for quitting smoking or as an alternative to tobacco use, and 10% for using recreationally for the first-time. Six shops stated there were shoppers that were young adult enthusiasts such cloud-chasers. A 2014 study evaluated the amounts of nicotine in 70 e-liquid bottles from 16 unlicensed vape shops. 17% of the samples tested had greater concentrations of nicotine than stated on the labels. One sample had a 172% greater amount of nicotine than indicated on the label.

In January 2017 an e-cigarette blew up in a man's hands while trying it out in a vape shop. In April 2016 a minor lost the ability to see in one eye and was burned when a vape shop employee in a Brooklyn, New York mall inserted the incorrect battery into an e-cigarette and it blew up. Vape shop owners said e-cigarette battery blasts are avoidable if users are cautious and adhere to battery safety directions. Local vape shop owners stated the risk from an e-cigarette blast is small.

A 2017 United States Department of Health and Human Services report stated, "We detected the presence of metals, such as chromium, lead, copper, and nickel on surfaces in the shop. This finding was not surprising given that these metals have also been measured by other researchers in e-liquids (chromium, lead, and nickel) and in vapor from e-cigarettes (chromium, nickel, and copper) Some of the other elements that we detected on surfaces are found in human sweat (calcium, potassium, magnesium, and phosphorous [sic]). It is unknown if their presence on surfaces was from e-cigarettes, people touching surfaces, or both."

=== In-store air quality ===
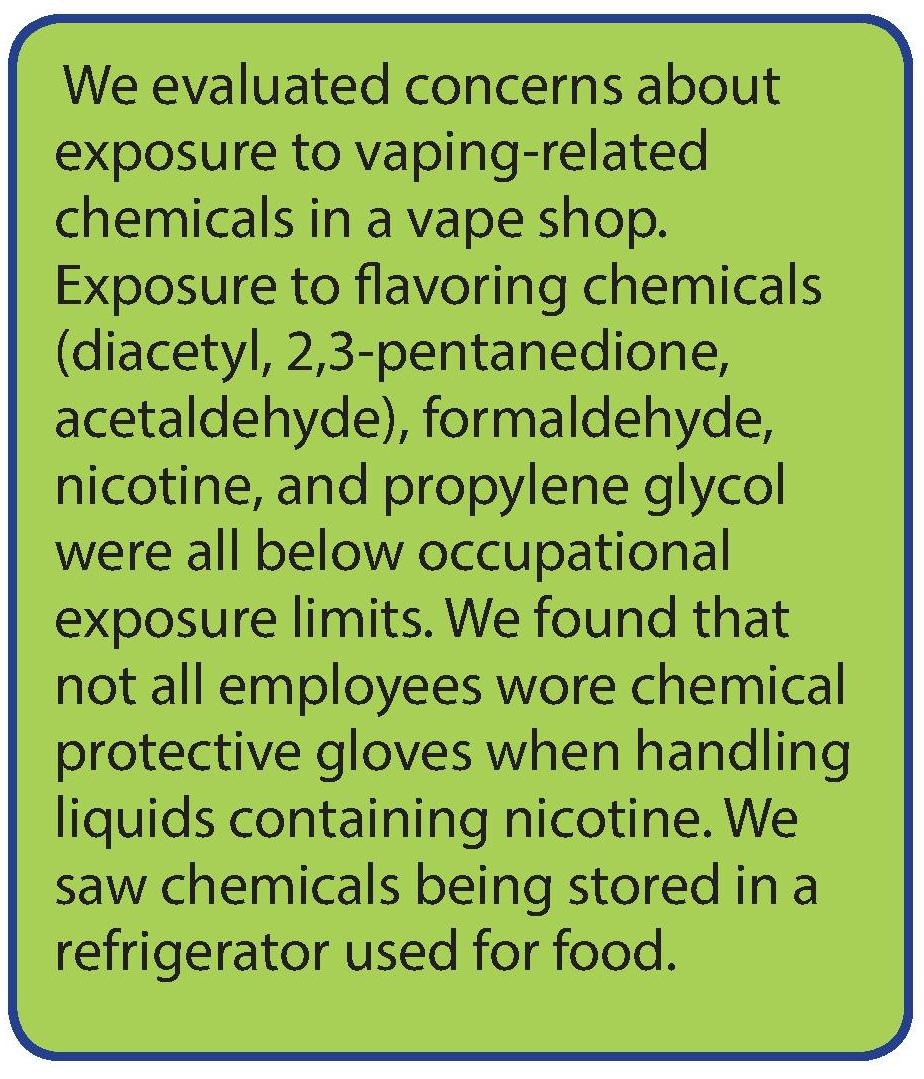
Highlights of concerns from a 2017 United States Department of Health and Human Services report regarding exposure to vaping-related chemicals in a vape shop

A 2017 United States Department of Health and Human Services report evaluated concerns about exposure to vaping-related chemicals in a vape shop. Exposure to flavoring chemicals (diacetyl, 2,3-pentanedione, acetaldehyde), formaldehyde, nicotine, and propylene glycol were all below occupational exposure limits (OELs). They found that not all employees wore chemical protective gloves when handling liquids containing nicotine. They saw chemicals being stored in a refrigerator used for food. The 2017 United States Department of Health and Human Services report concluded, "Employees were exposed to detectable levels of diacetyl and 2,3-pentanedione in the air while working in the vape shop. Although the measured concentrations were below all applicable OELs, to better protect the health of employees we recommend that the employer implement a policy prohibiting vaping in the work place with e-liquids that contain diacetyl and 2,3-pentanedione. The concentration of other vaping-related chemicals that we measured were also below their relevant OELs. Employees should be trained on proper chemical handling procedures and the need for consistent use of chemical protective nitrile gloves when handling liquids containing nicotine." "EC aerosols generated in a vape shop can travel into a nearby business where they deposit on surfaces forming [EC exhaled aerosol residue] ECEAR," according to a 2018 report.

=== Store owners ===
Vape shops are mainly small, independent businesses. They are started by owners of tobacco retailers and small bands of investors. There are also regional chains. The majority of vape shops are owned by individuals who vape. Vape shop owners mainly use the internet to get information on e-cigarettes, rather than rely on science-based evidence. The main source of information on e-cigarette products for vape shops is social media channels. Information is also obtained from e-cigarette company sales representatives and vape product warehouses, which could play a key role in informing vape shops of new e-cigarette products and in guiding shops on which items to offer and sell. Vape shops owners believe e-cigarettes are a lot safer than traditional cigarettes. Vape shop owners generally believe vaping is a habit. Vape shop owners described e-cigarette use as a hobby. Several vape shop owners stated that vaping provided an option to use nicotine in places where smoking was banned. Vape shop owners did not consider e-liquid nicotine addictive. Many vape shop owners thought that smokers have an addiction to the other chemicals in cigarettes, but not nicotine. Vape shop retailers demonstrated little interest in dealing with nicotine addiction. It has been reported that many vape shop owners do not know all of the substances contained in e-liquids. Some vape shop owners recognized that some e-liquids were made in unsanitary conditions. Retailers said that e-cigarette vapors is made up of merely water vapors, however, the evidence does not support this assertion. According to the view of among vape shop owners, Big Tobacco's entrance in the vaping industry will remain unsettling, as they pay for influence in the marketability of these devices, particularly to a younger audience. Some vape shop owners believed that it would be better if e-cigarettes were not regulated as tobacco products and thought that Big Tobacco was responsible for the proposed US FDA rules. A 2018 study found that local vape shops were often unaware of pending regulation in the US. This may be because vape shops struggled just to stay open: 20% of the sample closed over the course of a year, a 2018 report stated. The Centers for Disease Control and Prevention reported in 2019 that more than 380 cases of lung illness and six confirmed deaths across the US was linked to vaping, but TD Bowen, co-owner of Moon Mountain vape shop and e-liquids, says it is illicit vaping products that is the culprit. "I feel like it's a blatant lie though, the headlines, because it's not e-cigarettes that are doing it. There are ingredients and illicit drugs that are being sold on the street," said TD Bowen.

== Prevalence ==
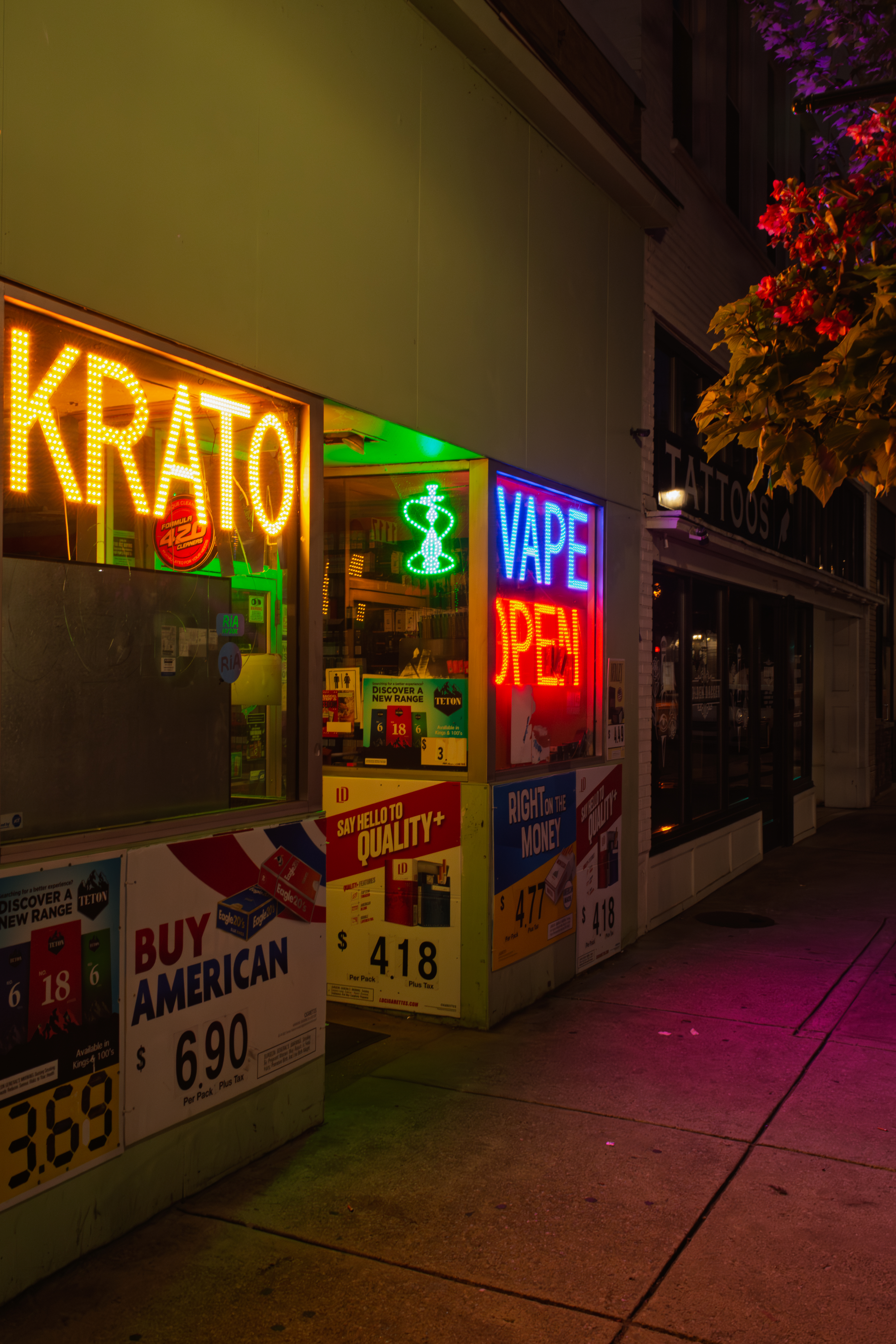
A vape shop in Huntington, West Virginia.

Vape shops are becoming increasingly popular. Over the few years leading up to 2018, vape shops have proliferated in a number of countries such as the US, at retail locations, as well as online. Over the few years leading up to 2015, vape shops have increased in a number of countries. As of 2015, vape shops are commonly found in Nova Scotia. In 2013, online search engine searches on vape shops surpassed searches on e-cigarettes. The markup of e-cigarettes as high as 200–400% may play a role in the prevalence of vape shops. Worldwide, retailers have sold millions of devices. Around a third of all sales of e-cigarette products take place in vape shops. In 2017, vape shops were believed to produce the highest sales for the e-cigarette market. For the UK in 2018, retailer vape shops were the most prevalence point of purchase, with above 40% of sales.

Vape shops in the US have emerged in large cities, and additionally in smaller metropolitan places. In 2014, the Smoke-Free Alternatives Trade Association estimated that there were 35,000 vape shops in the US, more than triple the number a year earlier. In 2016 data provided from Yelp showed that the western states are the hub of the e-cigarette business. The availability of vaping products in US stores is increasing, especially in places with low taxes and smoking bans. As of 2017, new vape shops are opening, in some cases close to schools. Vape shops in the US are more frequently to be located close to private universities and colleges in cities rather than rural places. In the US, e-cigarettes sold at retailers are more likely available in places with a higher median family income. Vape shops in southern California are found in places with a higher percentage of the Hispanic population, a 2018 report suggests. E-cigarettes sold at retailers is greater in US states with minimal clean indoor air policies and in areas with low cigarette taxes. Vape shops in the US are frequently located in census tracts where retailing of tobacco is strong, and where less racial minorities reside. Vape shops were more frequent in places where more White people reside. Vape shops in the US are more frequently located in places where people with a greater possibility for vaping and smoking reside.

Sales tanked sharply in the US as users were concerned by the initial government reports of individuals falling ill or dying following vaping in 2019. It is estimated at least 200 vape shops have closed in 2019.

There are numerous vape shops in Canada. In 2015, there were about 8,000 vape shops in the UK. Poorer areas in the UK have had an increase in the number of vape shops. In December 2015, there were 2,400 vape shops in France, 400 fewer than in March of the same year. Industry organization Fivape said the reduction was due to consolidation, not to reduced demand.

== Regulations ==
=== Australia ===
As of October 1, 2021, consumers in Australia are legally required to have a valid prescription from an Australian doctor to purchase nicotine vaping products, such as nicotine e-cigarettes and liquid nicotine. Consumers are not required to have a prescription to purchase vaping products that do not contain nicotine. Vapers who have a prescription for nicotine vaping products have two main pathways for filling their prescriptions: Australian pharmacies and overseas suppliers. Apart from Australian pharmacies, Australian retailers, including vape shops, are prohibited from selling nicotine vaping products. With a valid prescription, vapers in Australia can legally import nicotine vaping products from overseas suppliers for personal use using the Personal Importation Scheme under the Therapeutic Goods Act 1989.

The Personal Importation Scheme allows for vapers with a prescription to order a maximum of 3 months supply at one time and a maximum of 15 months supply in a 12 month period. The Australian Government has not clarified what exactly constitutes a 3 month supply of nicotine vaping products.

In 2020, Greg Hunt, the federal health minister at the time, proposed a 12-month federal ban on importing nicotine e-liquid into Australia for personal use. Under the former health minister's proposed import ban, those in breach of the ban could face a fine of up to $222,000. The proposed ban was later delayed for six months prior to implementation after widespread backlash from Coalition MPs. A total of 28 Coalition MPs and senators signed a petition opposing the proposed import ban. Less than three months before the import ban was to be implemented, the Australian Government scrapped the proposal and the Senate resolved to establish a Select Committee on Tobacco Harm Reduction to launch an inquiry into vaping and establish clear e-cigarette laws. The Senate select inquiry report, which was published in December 2020, recommended a prescription-based model for nicotine e-cigarettes, which was later endorsed by the Australian Medical Association and the Australian Council on Smoking and Health in a joint statement.

=== Canada ===
In late November 2015, Bill 44 was passed by the National Assembly, which regulates e-cigarettes as tobacco products in Quebec, Canada. It bans using e-cigarettes in vape shops, bans indoor displays and advertising, and bans sales on their websites. Vaping is prohibited in the same places as smoking. E-cigarettes are banned in restaurants and bar patios. E-cigarette use in enclosed public spaces is no longer legal. Patrons are no longer permitted to try out products inside a vape shop. Vape shops owners in Quebec state the revised law is harming their business. In November 2015 the Council of Saskatchewan voted to ban vaping wherever smoking is banned, except for vape shops. Jennifer Miller, representing the Lung Association of Saskatchewan, said they are primarily concerned for employees of vape shops who will inhale exhaled e-cigarette vapor. She said, "It's a lot of exposure for the lungs in a 40-hour work-week." Where they could only sell up to 2mg of nicotine as opposed to the USA's 5 mg.

=== Europe ===
The revised EU Tobacco Products Directive came into effect May 2016 which regulates the sale and marketing of e-cigarettes. Small business owners are concerned that the regulations will make e-cigarettes less interesting to consumers and that this means a downturn of their business. Vape tanks can be up to 2 ml in capacity and should come with nicotine warning stickers. E-liquid packages can be sold for up to 10 ml.

=== United Kingdom ===
In 2015, there were 262 vape shops in the UK, and in 2025 there were 3,776. New planning permission requirements on vape shops are proposed for 2027, and the definition of a vape shop will be made tighter.

Vape shops in the UK are not permitted to sell vaping products to anyone under the age of eighteen years. The law is intended to prevent children from having access to all types of tobacco and nicotine. The Independent British Vape Trade Association has a 15-point voluntary code of conduct. Along with asking shops to not deliberately sell their products to minors, to refrain from asserting health benefits from using e-cigarettes and comply with the law, it states the following: "Vape products are for current or former smokers and existing users of vaping devices, therefore [you should] never knowingly sell to anyone who is not a current or former smoker, or a current vaper." Close to 9 out of 10 vape shops in the UK are breaching the Independent British Vape Trade Association's code of conduct by offering e-cigarettes to non-smokers, according to an undercover investigation by the Royal Society for Public Health. The Royal Society for Public Health is insisting vape shops to abide by the industry's code of conduct.

England and Wales councils urged a 2024 ban on single-use vapes due to environmental and health concerns, as 1.3 million are discarded weekly. Recycling challenges, waste impact, and fire hazards are cited. Concerns about youth vaping are raised, While the UK Vaping Industry Association defends disposable vapes for aiding smoking cessation, they caution against potential black market products if a ban is enforced.

=== Mexico ===
In 2022, Mexico banned the sale of e-cigarettes in the country. Imports of vaping devices were banned in 2021.

=== New Zealand ===
Regulations for vaping products are regarded under the same legal umbrella as tobacco products, which are regulated under the Smokefree Environments and Regulated Products Act 1990 act. Various regulations have been added in place since to refine the regulations of vape usage.

All vape products manufactured or sold in New Zealand are required to undergo a "notification" system, whereby the products must be approved in accordance to the safety regulations. Under this regulation, it is the full responsibility of all vape stores to contact Health's Vaping Regulatory Authority about all products intended to be sold. As with other smoking products, a vaping product containing nicotine must be printed with clearly labelled warnings about the harmful effects of nicotine.

Since 25 November 2020, businesses selling vape products can register to be a Specialist Vape Retailer, which possesses its own regulations to the sale and promotion of vape products. Any retailer of a physical retail store may contact Vaping Regulatory Authority to consider it as a Specialist Vape Retailer if at least 60% of total sales from the retailer derives from vaping products, with a marginal consideration if between 60% and 70% sales. An online-only business cannot apply as a Specialist Vape Retailer.

Currently, the largest Specialist Vape Retailer in New Zealand is Shosha. Shosha currently have over 120 physical stores nationwide and offer deliveries to both New Zealand and Australian customers.

=== United States ===
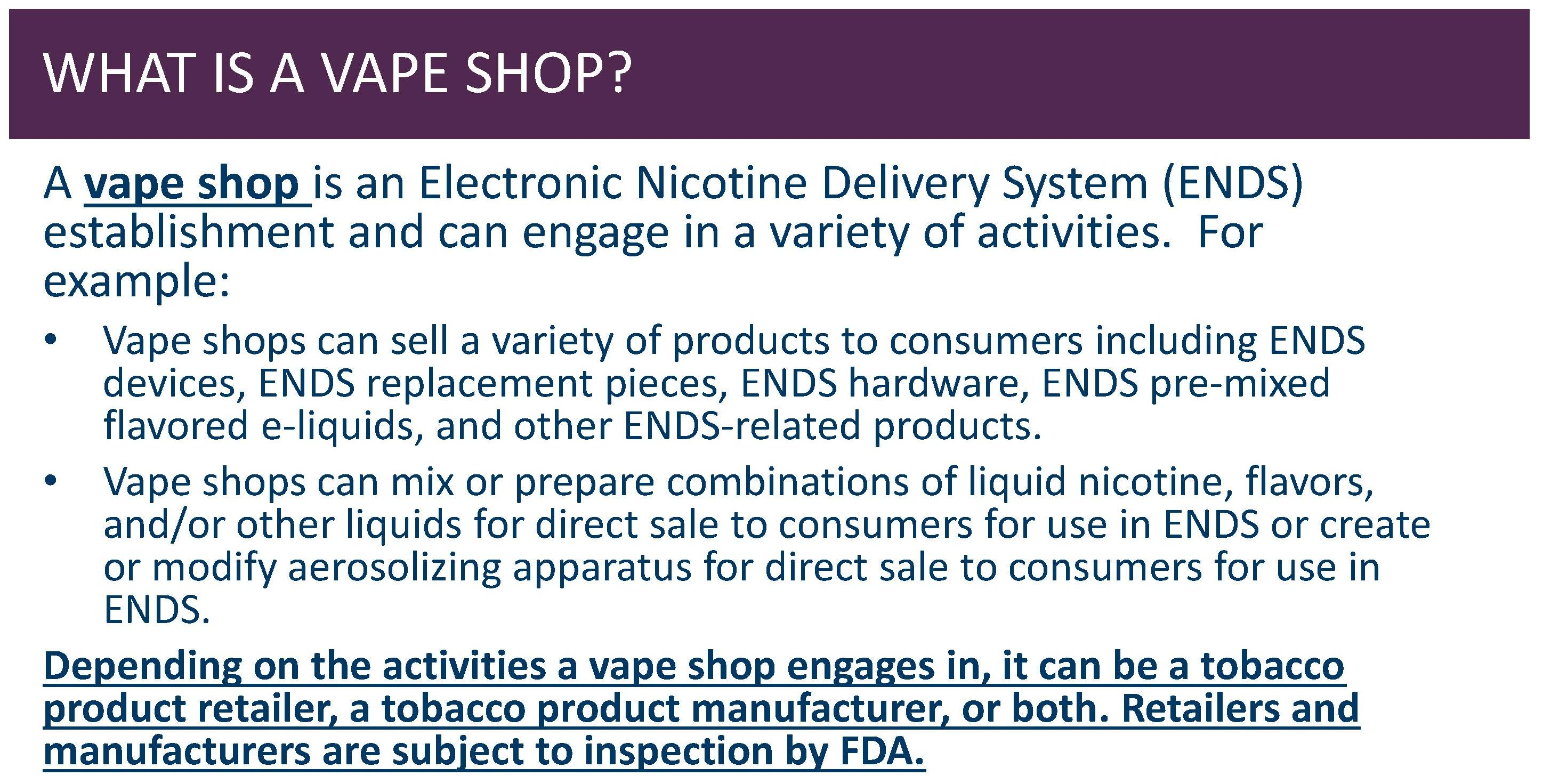
The FDA explains what a vape shop is, among other information.

Effective August 8, 2016, under the Food and Drug Administration (US FDA) rules, a vape shop that mixes or prepares e-liquids, or makes or modifies any kind of e-cigarettes, is regulated as a tobacco product manufacturer. The categorization of vape shops that make or modify e-cigarettes including e-liquids as manufacturers mandating abiding with the US FDA manufacturing standards, have been extended to August 8, 2022. Vape shops cannot hand out free samples to patrons or sell to individuals under 18 years of age and, in most cases, cannot grant refunds of money or product exchanges. Individuals under the age of 18 are not allowed to purchase or handle e-cigarette devices. Retailers are required to ask for photo ID from patrons who look to be under 27 years of age. "One of the most important provisions to help reduce youth access to tobacco products is the prohibition on free samples of tobacco products," US FDA Commissioner Scott Gottlieb stated in October 2017. "With more youth using e-cigarettes than any other tobacco product, it's critical that manufacturers and retailers understand how we intend to enforce this provision," he added. Five individuals were arrested for selling e-cigarette products to patrons under 21 years of age at vape shops in Suffolk County, New York in December 2017, local police stated. There are no strict US FDA rules in regard to the age of people who enter vape shops.

The significant increase in employees directly telling customers of free e-cigarette puff trial offers rather than posting displays of the offers in the shop suggest retailers are finding ways around the impending US FDA regulations by not having displays but still engaging in the (soon-to-be illegal) behavior. This may signify that awareness of, but not necessarily compliance with, the impending rules is occurring in the vape marketplace. Effective May 10, 2018, vape shop retailers were prohibited from selling or distributing e-cigarettes or other vape products without including a health warning statement on the product packaging and from displaying e-cigarette or other vape product advertisements without including a health warning statement on the ads.

In 2018 the US FDA investigated JUUL to determine if they are marketing its e-cigarette that looks like a USB flash drive to youth. Two vape shops in New Jersey were notified by the US FDA in April 2018 to stop selling JUUL e-cigarettes to minors. "The illegal sale of these JUUL products to minors is concerning. In fact, just since the beginning of March, US FDA compliance checks have uncovered 40 violations for illegal sales of JUUL products to youth. The US FDA has issued 40 warning letters for those violations, which we are also announcing today. This includes warning letters that are the result of the blitz. Others are a result of our sustained enforcement efforts to reduce tobacco product sales to minors. And we anticipate taking many more similar actions as a result of the ongoing blitz and our focus on enforcement related to youth access," US FDA Commissioner Dr. Scott Gottlieb stated on April 24, 2018. The US FDA announced several new actions and efforts aimed at doing just that as the first steps in a new Youth Tobacco Prevention Plan focused on stopping youth use of tobacco products, and in particular, e-cigarettes. The FDA also sent an official request for information directly to JUUL Labs, requiring the company to submit important documents to better understand the reportedly high rates of youth use and the particular youth appeal of these products. In response, JUUL Labs announced in April 2018 the programs they are initiating to prevent young people from using their products.

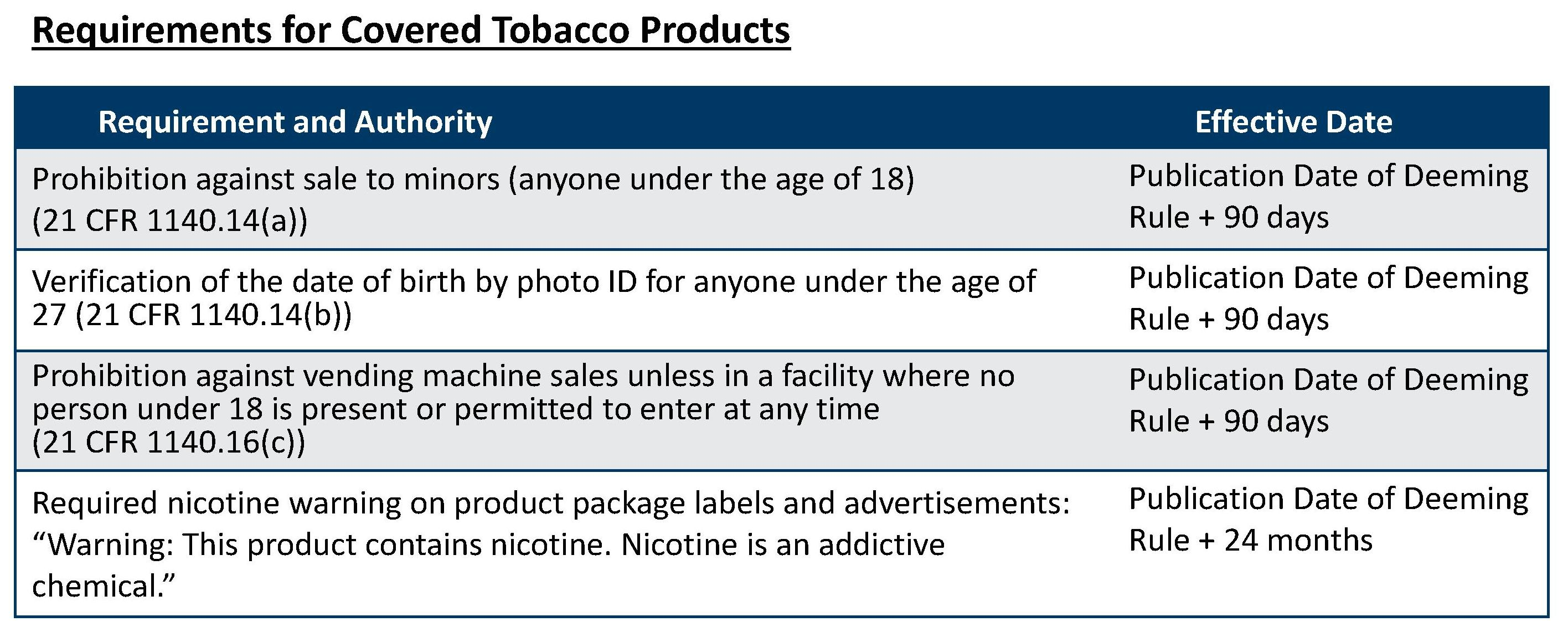
The revised FDA rules banned sales to minors, among other things.

Effective June 9, 2016, under California's tobacco laws, the minimum age to purchase tobacco products was raised from 18 to 21 and e-cigarettes were added to the current definition of tobacco products. As part of the rules, e-cigarettes, e-liquids, in addition to vaping devices and accessories, are not permitted to be sold in self-service displays. "Today marks a significant moment in California history as new tobacco control laws go into effect statewide. This is the first time the Golden State has raised the age of sale for tobacco since the law first took effect 144 years ago," said Dr. Karen Smith, California Department of Public Health director and state health officer, on June 9, 2016. "Our focus is on reaching more than 34,000 retailers with tobacco licenses and vape shops to provide them the information and resources needed to comply with the new tobacco 21 law." The California Department of Public Health, Food and Drug Branch is charged with enforcing the Stop Tobacco Access to Kids Enforcement Act, and conducts ongoing illegal sales enforcement operations. California retailers caught selling tobacco products to minors during these enforcement operations are subject to fines up to $6,000.

In May 2016 the US FDA used its authority under the Family Smoking Prevention and Tobacco Control Act to deem e-cigarette devices and e-liquids to be tobacco products, which meant it intended to regulate the marketing, labelling, and manufacture of devices and liquids; vape shops that mix e-liquids or make or modify devices were considered manufacturing sites that needed to register with US FDA and comply with good manufacturing practice regulation. Small vape shop businesses are concerned about the US FDA regulations. Vape shop owners in the US are concerned about the costs of adhering to the proposed US FDA regulations. According to the US FDA filing applications will take approximately 1,500 hours to complete with a price between $117,000 to $466,000. E-cigarette advocates stated filing US FDA applications is too expensive for small companies, which will give consumers less options because it is expected only large tobacco companies can afford the steep costs. The concern in the vaping community is the US FDA rules will favor large tobacco companies' one-time use e-cigarettes. Vape shop owner Brent Ellis believes the FDA rules might shut down his business.

On May 5, 2016, the US FDA announced that all tobacco products will be regulated, including e-cigarettes, which require vape shops to register as tobacco companies. The FDA acknowledged that many vape shops will go out of business, but they also state many will stay open, despite hefty costs. Part of the new law requires products to state nicotine is addictive. As of 2017 sellers of vaping products and other affiliated products in California are obligated to obtain a retailer's license from the California State Board of Equalization. Vape shop owner Joe Baba in the US believes a ban on public vaping might put several vape shops out of business because taste-testing would be prohibited. Cheryl Jones, a vape shop co-owner in DuBois, Pennsylvania said in June 2016 that she believes that the US FDA rules will eliminate 90% of the items sold at vape shops. The American Vaping Association said it could cost upwards of a $1 million to get a new product approved by the US FDA. Most vaping products must adhere to the US FDA rules in order to be legally sold. E-cigarette and tobacco companies have recruited lobbyists in an effort to prevent the FDA from evaluating e-cigarette products or banning existing products already on the market. In 2016, some big companies have taken legal action disputing the US FDA regulations. In January 2018, vape shops in 5 US states have taken legal action disputing a rule established by the US FDA that declares e-cigarettes and similar devices to be regulated as tobacco products. The FDA is planning on banning the sale of e-liquid flavors at convenience stores and gas stations. Tobacco, mint, and menthol flavors will still be allowed at convenience stores, gas stations, and other places where they are sold. Fruity-type flavors can only be sold at places where adults shop, such as vape shops.

== Trade show ==
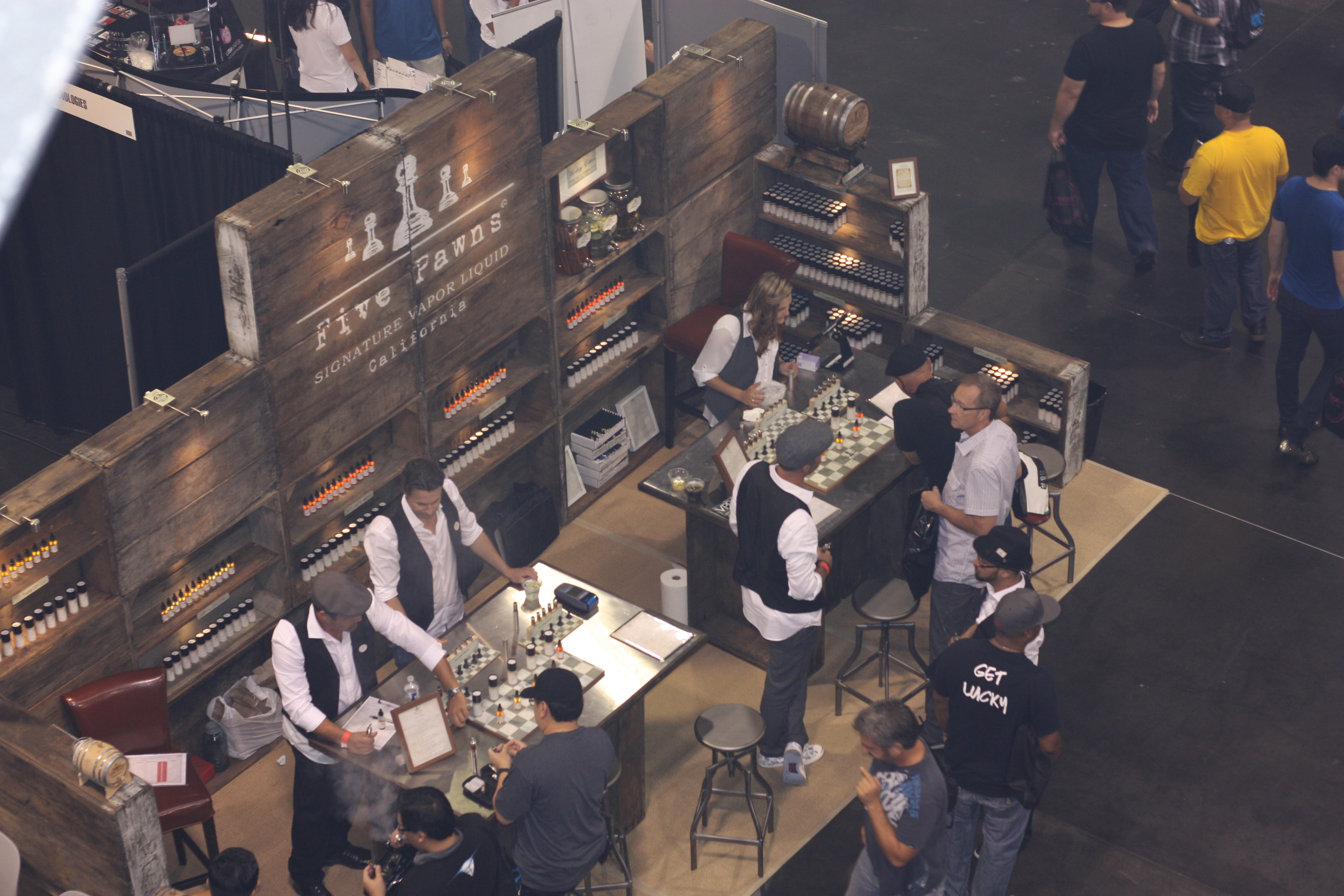
A bird's-eye view of the Electronic Cigarette Convention in Anaheim, California, United States, in 2013

Vape trade shows have an array of product vendors, seminars, social interactions with other vapers, parties, gifts, vaping contests, and other activities. By 2015, the number of vaping trade show organizations arranging vape trade shows had grown to 41. This includes 90 trade shows, with 6 set for 2016 in 8 countries. Vape shows were organized in 26 US states. They ranged from smaller local shows to large shows jumping around among cities. Most vape show organizations are in the US. Others are in Belgium, Canada, China, France, Germany, South Africa, and the United Kingdom. Vape shows are free to attend or have an entrance fee that cost from $10 to $25. In 2014, vaping contests at vape trade shows such as cloud-chasing were rare. By 2015, close to 50% of vaping trade show organizations promoted contests such as cloud-chasing. Vaping at the shows is permitted and encouraged, which lead to photo and video footage displayed on show Websites. Every show provided sponsors or vendors that offered for sale their products at the shows, which support people to observe and use vaping products. Vaping is permitted in places for vaping shows while vaping is prohibited in those places for other events. In July 2015, a New Jersey vape trade show was fined for breaching the state's 2010 indoor smoke-free law, which bans vaping indoors. Vape trade shows are increasing in popularity and regularity.

Vape shows include VapeBash, VapeCon, VapeXpo Vapestock, Vape-a-Palooza, Vapetoberfest, Vapor Gras, and Canada Vape Expo. Vape Fest, which started in 2010, is an annual vape show hosted by different cities across the US. The first annual Electronic Cigarette Convention began in September 2013 at the Anaheim Convention Center, with the second moving to the Ontario Convention Center. Vape Summit started in 2013. World Vapor Expo began in 2014 at Rosemont, Illinois, US. World Vapor Expo was held in Miami, Florida, US in 2017. E-cigarette marketing approaches at the 2017 World Vapor Expo included providing samples of candy flavored e-liquids along with actual matching candy samples. A 2018 report stated, "E-cigarette marketing strategies such as those observed at the 2017 World Vapor Expo echo earlier cigarette promotions infamously used by the tobacco industry to attract consumers, most notably teenagers." Oregon Vape Festival began in January 2015. In May 2015 at Vape Summit 3 in Las Vegas, there was a cloud-chasing competition. Vaper Expo UK began in 2016 at Birmingham, UK. In May 2016 Vape Summit was held in Paris, France. VapeShow Prague in the Czech Republic began in 2016. The Hall of Vape in Messe Stuttgart, Stuttgart, Germany is an annual event held in May. Vape Expo China, which started in 2015, is an annual vape show held in different cities in China. Vape shop owners, agents, distributors, and vapers attended the trade show. Vape Expo Japan was held from March 29 to March 31, 2018 in Osaka, Japan. Approximately 180 exhibitors from at least 25 countries attended the show. The VapEvent 2018 is mainly a trade show for businesses. The Vapor Mania Expo was held on October 12 and 13, 2019 at the Florida State Fairgrounds.

== Gallery ==
Various vape shops

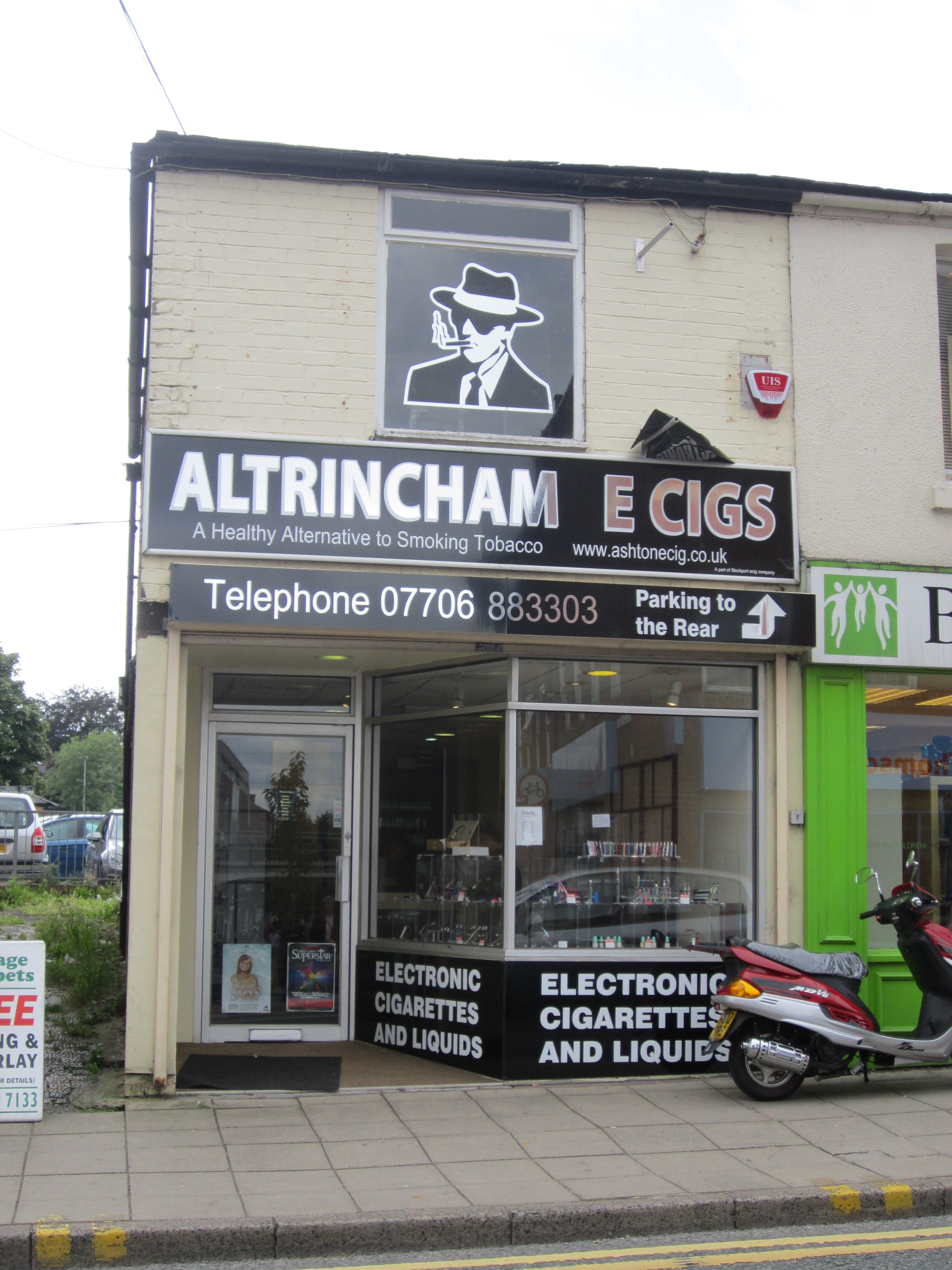
Vape shop in Altrincham, Greater Manchester, England

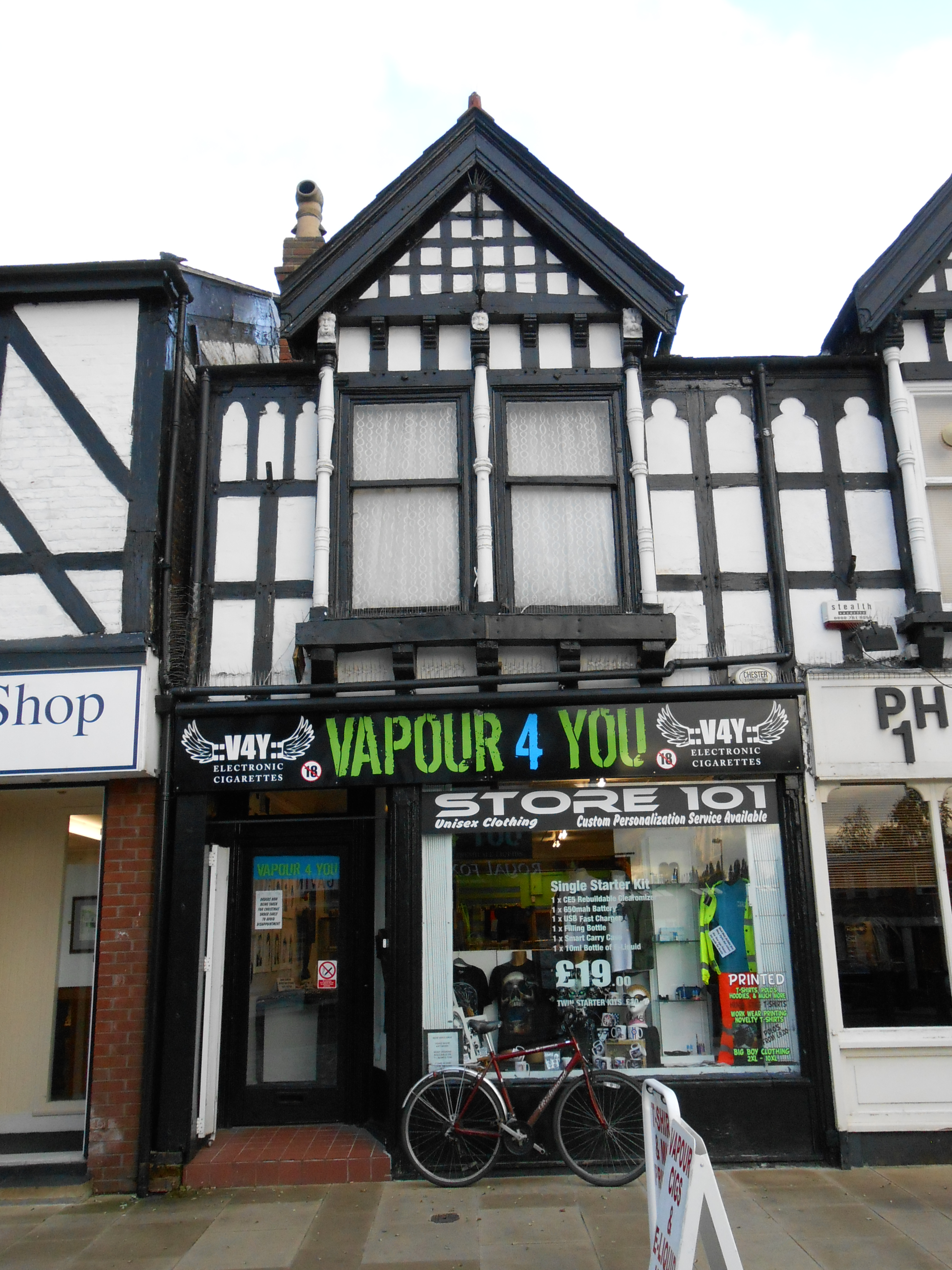
Vape shop in Northwich, Cheshire, England

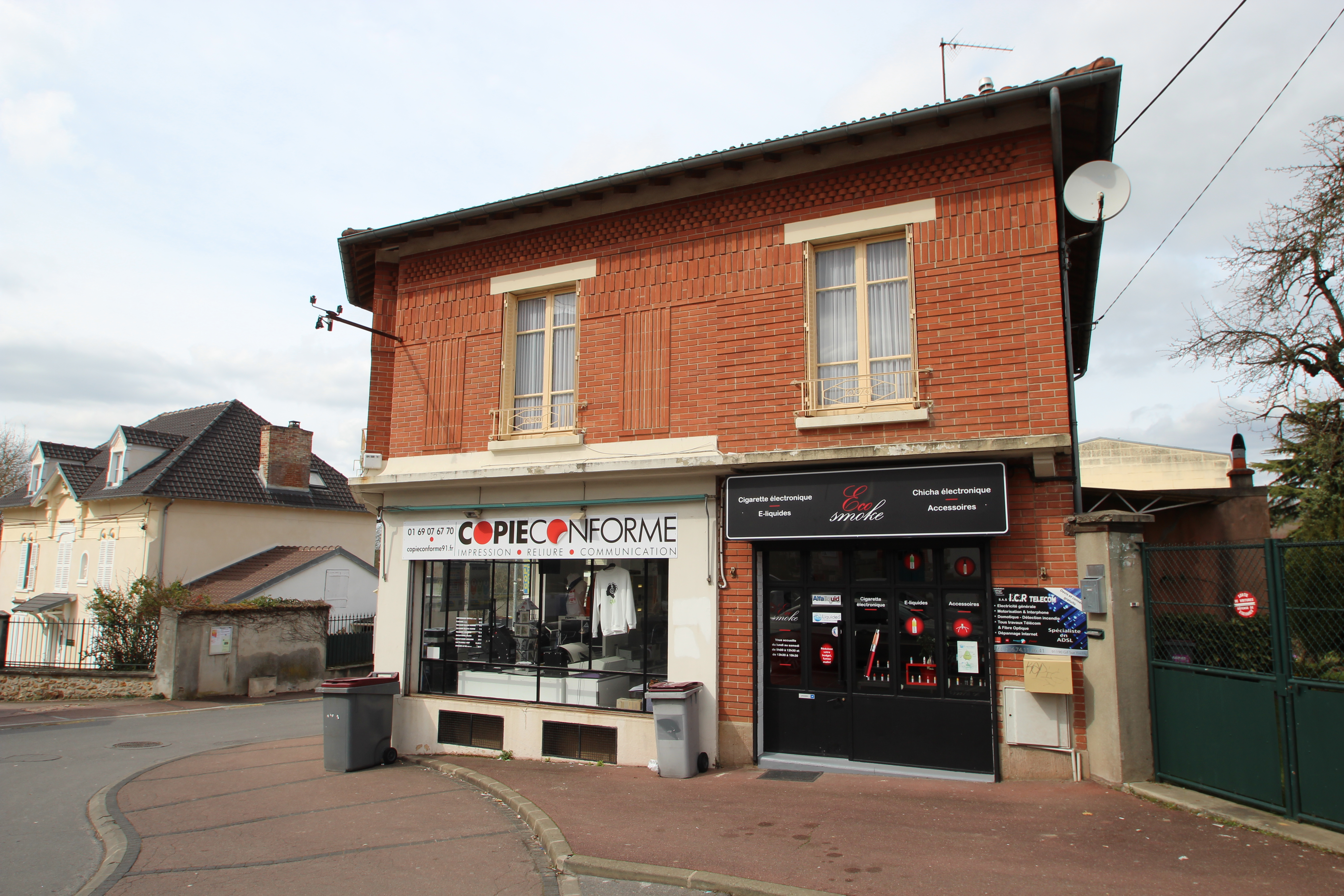
Vape shop in Bures-sur-Yvette, France

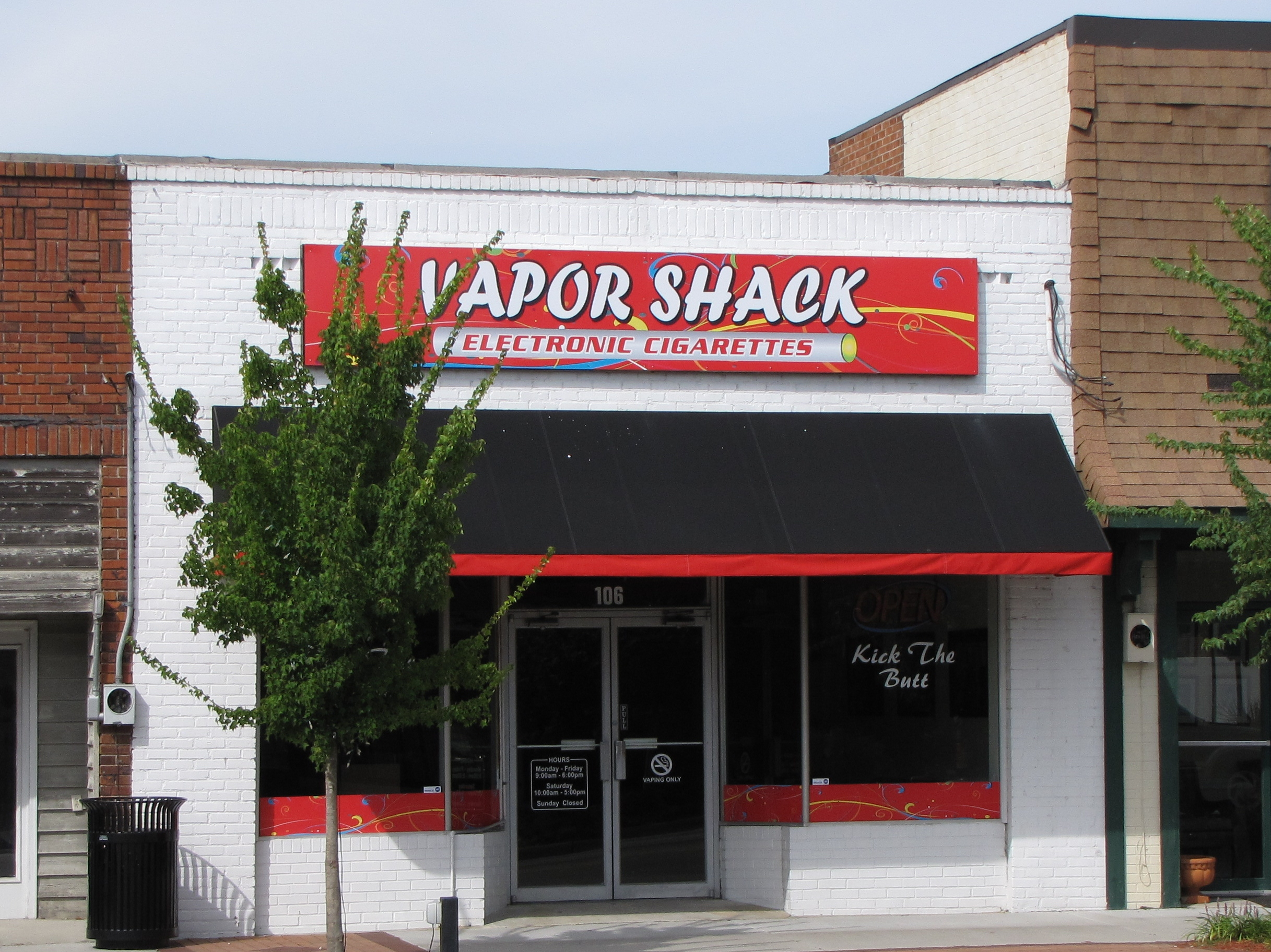
Vape shop in Hope Mills, North Carolina, United States

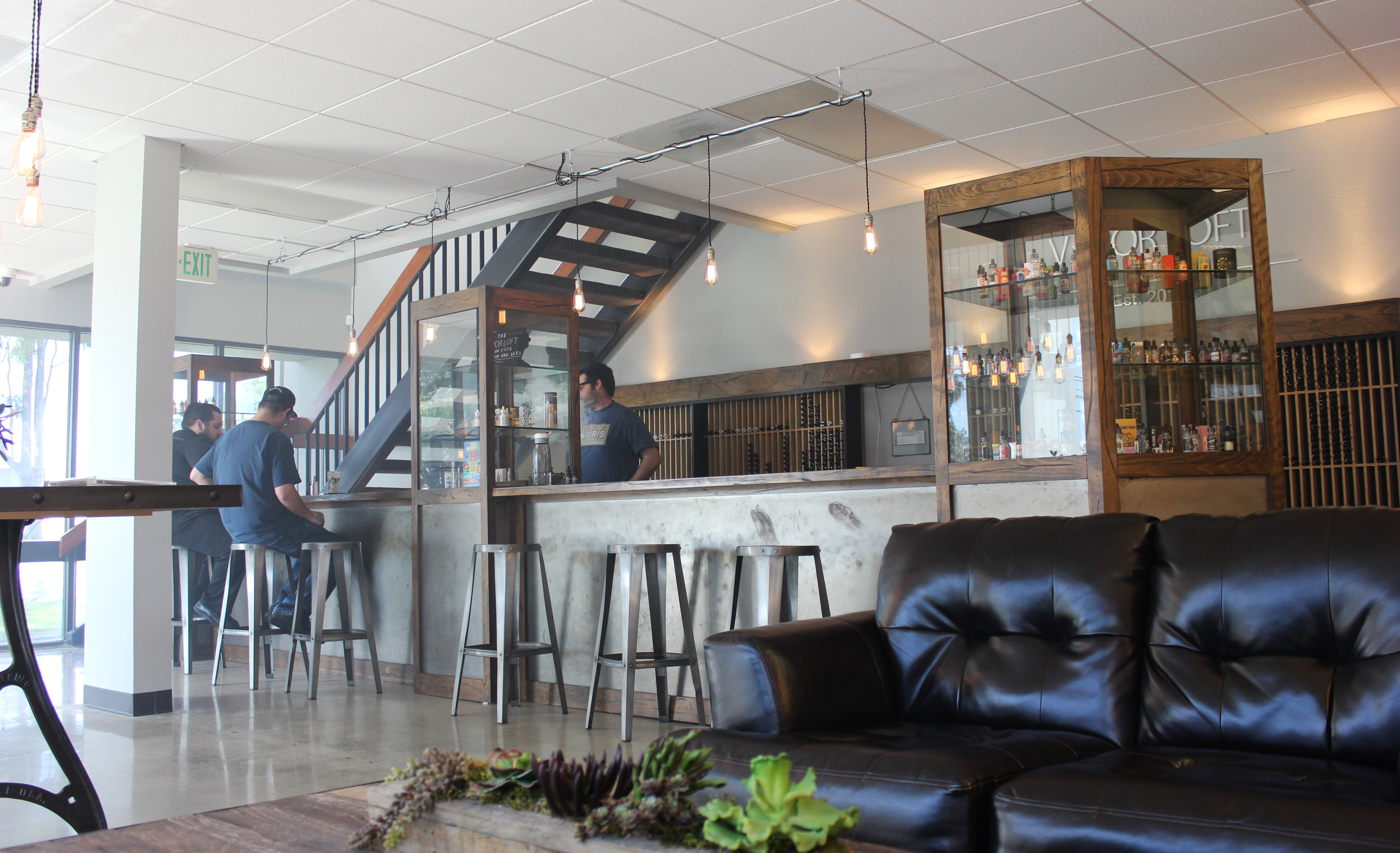
Interior view of a vape shop in Orange, California, United States

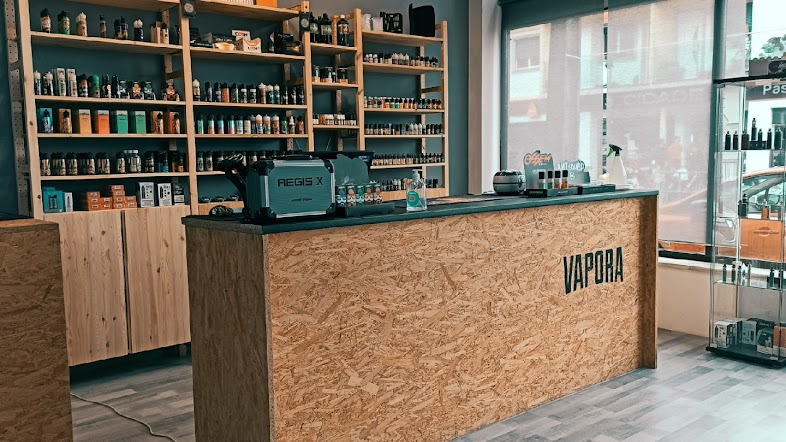
Vapora Vape Shop interior in Aveiro Portugal

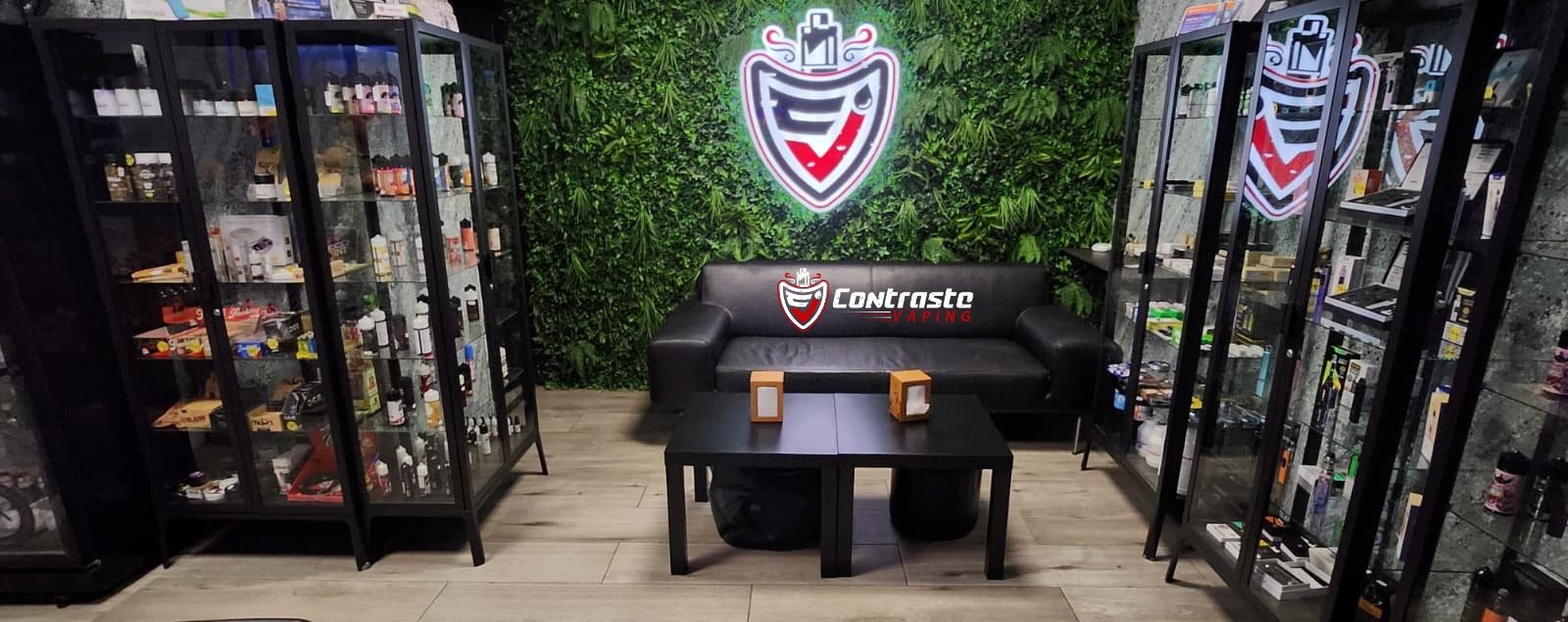
Interior view of a Contraste vape shop in Setúbal, Portugal

== Bibliography ==
- McNeill, A; Brose, LS; Calder, R; Bauld, L; Robson, D (February 2018). "Evidence review of e-cigarettes and heated tobacco products 2018" (PDF). UK: Public Health England. pp. 1–243.
- Stratton, Kathleen; Kwan, Leslie Y.; Eaton, David L. (January 2018). Stratton, Kathleen; Kwan, Leslie Y.; Eaton, David L. (eds.). Public Health Consequences of E-Cigarettes (PDF). National Academies of Sciences, Engineering, and Medicine (National Academies Press). pp. 1–774. doi:10.17226/24952. ISBN 978-0-309-46834-3. PMID 29894118.
- "E-Cigarette Use Among Youth and Young Adults: A Report of the Surgeon General" (PDF). United States Department of Health and Human Services. Surgeon General of the United States. 2016. pp. 1–298.
