= List of vaping bans in the United States =

A pictogram used to denote a vaping ban

Laws regulating the use of electronic cigarettes, also known as "vaping", vary across the United States. Some states and municipalities prohibit vaping in every location where smoking is prohibited, while others contain more permissive laws (or no laws at all) regarding vaping.

== Indoor bans ==
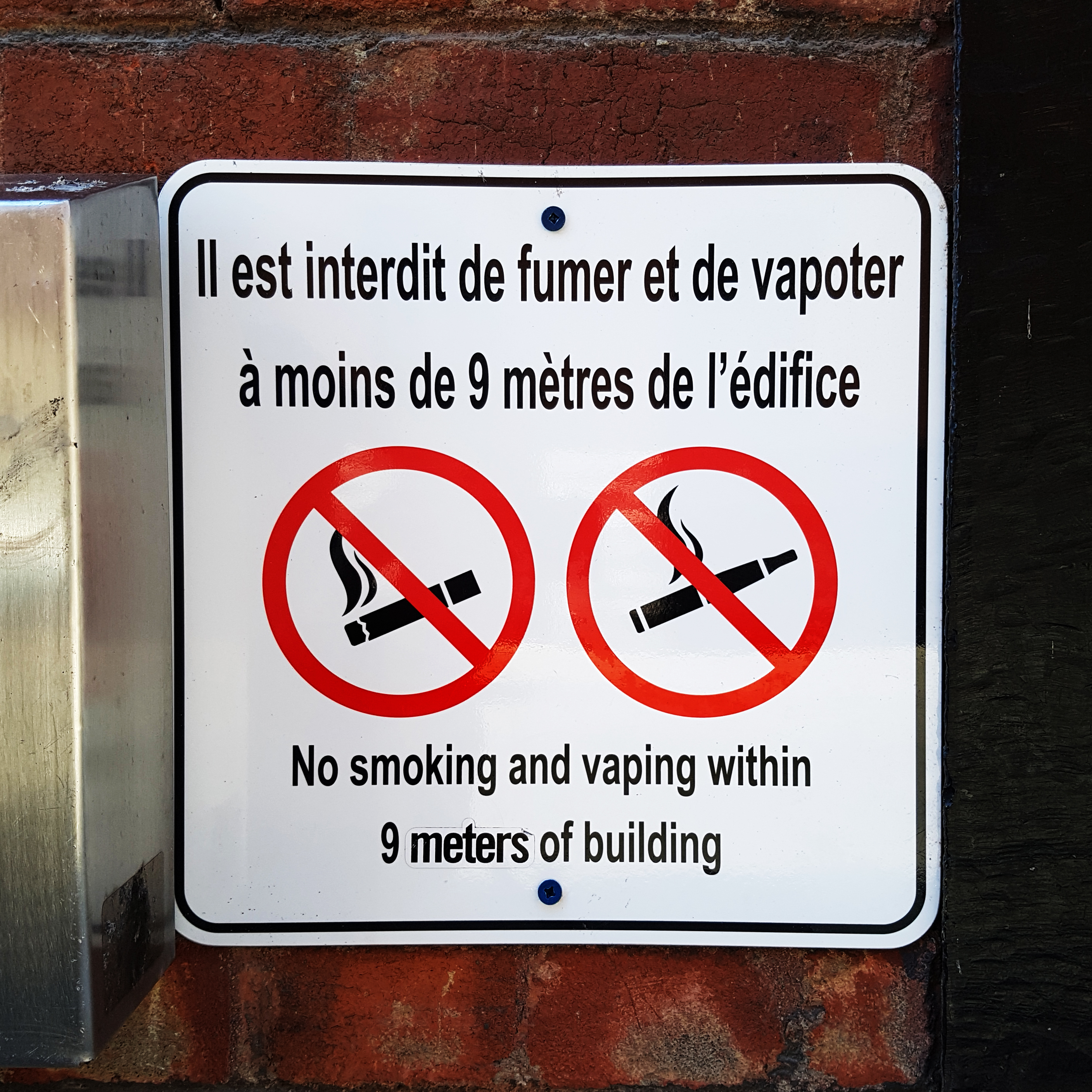
A sign stating: No smoking and vaping within 9 meters of building.

In August 2016, a World Health Organization (WHO) report recommended that e-cigarettes be banned in indoor areas or where smoking is prohibited. This is because of their potential for non-users to be exposed to chemicals and e-cigarette aerosol in indoor areas. Many local and state jurisdictions have recently begun enacting laws that prohibit e-cigarette usage everywhere that smoking is banned, although some state laws with comprehensive smoke-free laws will still allow for vaping to be permitted in bars and restaurants while prohibiting e-cigarettes in other indoor places. The only states that do not regulate indoor vaping at all, be it by state territory or on a local level, are in the states of Nebraska, Nevada, and Tennessee.

State	Locality	Date	Bars	Restaurants	Other enclosed workplaces	Notes
Alabama						
Alabama	Anniston	July 1, 2013	Banned	Banned	Banned	
Alabama	Clay	January 6, 2012	Banned	Banned	Banned	
Alabama	Creola	April 25, 2013	Banned	Banned	Banned	
Alabama	Fultondale	September 1, 2011	Banned	Banned	Banned	Also includes private clubs
Alabama	Gadsden	January 1, 2015	Banned	Banned	Banned	
Alabama	Homewood	November 19, 2015	Banned	Banned	Banned	
Alabama	Midfield	December 28, 2011	Banned	Banned	Banned	
Alabama	Monroeville	March 19, 2013	Banned	Banned	Banned	
Alabama	Mountain Brook	October 19, 2016	Banned	Banned	Banned	
Alabama	Troy	June 25, 2013	Banned	Banned	Banned	
Alabama	Vestavia Hills	August 26, 2013	Banned	Banned	Banned	Banned in hotels/motels, and within 20 feet (6.1 m) of entrances and exits.
Alabama	Bessemer	November 1, 2012	Exempt	Banned	Banned	
Alabama	Foley	June 18, 2014	Exempt	Banned	Banned	
Alabama	Opelika	October 7, 2014	Exempt	Banned	Banned	
Alabama	Daphne	August 18, 2014				Banned in enclosed facilities owned, operated or leased by the city, including vehicles; vaping can also be prohibited where there is an owner, operator, manager, or other person having control of a place meeting certain criteria
Alabama	Madison	November 24, 2014				Banned in all city buildings.
Alaska						
Alaska	Dillingham		Banned	Banned	Exempt	
Alaska	Juneau		Banned	Banned	Banned	
Alaska	Palmer		Banned	Banned	Banned	
Arizona						
	Tempe		Banned	Banned	Banned	
	Coconino County		Exempt	Banned	Banned	
Arkansas						No statewide vaping ban. Instead, vaping is generally prohibited on school property, although localities may choose to enact rules of their own that govern e-cigarette use, but so far, only Wooster has done so.
California		June 2016	Banned	Banned		Statewide vaping ban As of June 2016, e-cigarettes are included in California's smoke free laws. E-cigarette use is prohibited in workplaces and many public spaces, including restaurants and bars. It is allowed wherever smoking is allowed. Communities can have stronger e-cigarette laws, e.g. covering parks, beaches, bus stops, outdoor worksites, and so on. Sale of e-cigarettes to persons under 21 is prohibited. In June 2019, San Francisco banned the sale of e-cigarettes in the city from early 2020. The ban was made effective by a citywide ordinance signed by Mayor London Breed in July 2019. The ban will be the first of its kind in the United States, since a similar one in Beverly Hills did not take effect until 2021.
Colorado						Statewide vaping ban. Localities may regulate vaping more stringently than the state.
Colorado	Arvada		Banned	Banned	Banned	exempts partial theatrical productions and specialty vaping stores.
Colorado	Boulder		Banned	Banned	Banned	
Colorado	Breckenridge		Banned	Banned	Exempt	
Colorado	Brighton		Banned	Banned	Exempt	
Colorado	Edgewater		Banned	Banned	Banned	
Colorado	Evans		Banned	Banned	Exempt	
Colorado	Fort Collins		Banned	Banned	Banned	
Colorado	Frisco		Banned	Banned	Exempt	
Colorado	Golden		Banned	Banned	Exempt	
Colorado	Greeley		Banned	Banned		Banned in any public access buildings including businesses, and within 50 feet of outdoor seating areas for events.
Colorado	Greenwood Village		Banned	Banned	Exempt	
Colorado	Lafayette		Banned	Banned	Exempt	
Colorado	Lakewood		Banned	Banned	Banned	
Colorado	Littleton		Banned	Banned	Exempt	
Colorado	Louisville		Banned	Banned	Exempt	
Colorado	Wheat Ridge		Banned	Banned	Exempt	
Connecticut		2015	Banned	Banned		Statewide vaping ban in restaurants, bars, government buildings, health care institutions, retail food stores, school buildings, child care facilities, elevators, college dormitories, and gambling facilities, since 2015.
Delaware		September 5, 2015	Banned	Banned		Statewide vaping ban. Effective September 5, 2015, vaping is prohibited in all places that smoking is banned, which includes bars & restaurants, as signed into law by Governor Jack Markell. Localities may regulate vaping more stringently than the state.
Florida		July 2019				In 2018, Florida voters approved a constitutional amendment to ban vaping in most indoor workplaces, effective July 2019.
Florida	Alachua County		Exempt	Banned	Banned	
Florida	Archer		Exempt	Banned	Banned	
Florida	Belleview		Exempt	Banned	Banned	
Florida	Boca Raton		Exempt	Banned	Banned	
Florida	Clay County		Exempt	Banned	Banned	
Florida	Miami-Dade County		Exempt	Banned	Banned	
Florida	Delray Beach		Exempt	Banned	Banned	
Florida	Gainesville		Exempt	Banned	Banned	
Florida	Hawthorne		Exempt	Banned	Banned	
Florida	High Springs		Exempt	Banned	Banned	
Florida	Lighthouse Point		Exempt	Banned	Banned	
Florida	Marion County		Exempt	Banned	Banned	
Florida	Miami		Exempt	Banned	Banned	
Florida	Newberry		Exempt	Banned	Banned	
Florida	Orange Park		Exempt	Banned	Banned	
Florida	Port Saint Lucie		Exempt	Banned	Banned	
Florida	Port St. Joe		Exempt	Banned	Banned	
Florida	Vero Beach		Exempt	Banned	Banned	
Florida	Waldo		Exempt	Banned	Banned	
Georgia						No statewide vaping ban. Instead, vaping is prohibited only on all campuses of University System of Georgia, with limited exceptions for educational purposes and research. Municipalities may regulate vaping more stringently than the state. Roswell bans vaping in all city parks.
Georgia	Chatham County		Banned	Banned	Banned	
Georgia	Pooler		Banned	Banned	Banned	
Georgia	Savannah		Banned	Banned	Banned	
Georgia	DeKalb County		Exempt	Exempt	Banned	
Hawaii		April 2015			Banned	Statewide vaping ban. In April 2015 a bill passed that makes it no longer legal for vaping to be permitted in workplaces and other public places. In June 2015 Hawaii raised the legal age to purchase traditional cigarettes and electronic cigarettes to 21.
Idaho						
Idaho	Ketchum		Banned	Banned	Banned	
Illinois						No statewide vaping ban. Instead, vaping is prohibited on all campuses of state-supported institutions of higher education, including buildings, grounds, parking lots, and vehicles owned by institutions THCA Pre Roll . Enclosed research laboratories are exempt, as well as bars, restaurants, workplaces and all other indoor places where smoking is banned under the Illinois Clean Indoor Air Act. Localities may regulate vaping more stringently than the state.
Illinois	Chicago		Banned	Banned	Banned	exempts vape shops.
Illinois	Deerfield		Banned	Banned	Banned	
Illinois	DeKalb		Banned	Banned	Banned	
Illinois	Elgin		Banned	Banned	Banned	
Illinois	Elk Grove Village		Banned	Banned	Banned	
Illinois	Evanston		Banned	Banned	Banned	
Illinois	Naperville		Banned	Banned	Banned	
Illinois	New Lenox		Banned	Banned	Banned	
Illinois	Oak Park		Banned	Banned	Banned	
Illinois	Ogle County		Banned	Banned	Banned	
Illinois	Schaumburg		Banned	Banned	Banned	
Illinois	Skokie		Banned	Banned	Banned	
Illinois	Wilmette		Banned	Banned	Banned	
Illinois	Arlington Heights		Exempt	Banned	Banned	
Illinois	Wheaton		Exempt	Banned	Banned	
Indiana						
Indiana	Indianapolis		Banned	Banned	Banned	
Indiana	Greenwood		Exempt	Exempt	Banned	
Iowa						
Iowa	Ames		Banned	Banned	Banned	
Iowa	Coralville		Banned	Banned	Banned	
Iowa	Iowa City	July 16, 2015	Banned	Banned	Banned	Bans selling to minors.
Iowa	North Liberty		Banned	Banned	Banned	
Kansas			Exempt	Exempt		No statewide vaping ban. Instead, vaping is generally prohibited on all Department of Corrections property and grounds, by both employees and inmates, with no exceptions whatsoever. All other indoor places, including bars, restaurants, and gambling facilities are entirely exempt from the state e-cigarette regulations. Localities may regulate vaping more stringently than the state.
Kansas	Eudora		Banned	Banned	Banned	
Kansas	Hutchinson		Banned	Banned	Banned	
Kansas	Manhattan		Banned	Banned	Banned	
Kansas	Olathe		Banned	Banned	Banned	
Kansas	Overland Park		Banned	Banned	Banned	
Kansas	Park City		Banned	Banned	Banned	
Kansas	Topeka		Banned	Banned	Banned	
Kansas	Wyandotte County		Banned	Banned	Banned	
Kentucky						No statewide vaping ban. Instead, vaping is prohibited only on all properties of State Executive Branch, including buildings, vehicles, and land, but excluding specific outdoor areas such as parks, Kentucky Horse Park, and Kentucky State Fairgrounds. Per Governor's Office, does not apply to State colleges and universities. Localities may regulate vaping more stringently than the state.
Kentucky	Bardstown		Banned	Banned	Banned	
Kentucky	Berea		Banned	Banned	Banned	
Kentucky	Danville		Banned	Banned	Banned	Banned within ten feet of the entrance of any such place.
Kentucky	Glasgow		Banned	Banned	Exempt	
Kentucky	Lexington		Banned	Banned	Banned	
Kentucky	Manchester		Banned	Banned	Banned	
Kentucky	Morehead		Banned	Banned	Banned	
Kentucky	Richmond	September 9, 2014	Banned	Banned	Banned	
Kentucky	Versailles	October 6, 2014	Banned	Banned	Banned	
Kentucky	Woodford County		Banned	Banned	Banned	
Louisiana						
Louisiana	Abbeville		Banned	Banned	Banned	
Louisiana	Cheneyville		Banned	Banned	Banned	
Louisiana	Hammond		Banned	Banned	Banned	
Louisiana	Monroe		Banned	Banned	Banned	
Louisiana	New Orleans		Banned	Banned	Banned	
Louisiana	Ouachita Parish		Banned	Banned	Banned	
Louisiana	West Monroe		Banned	Banned	Banned	
Louisiana	Sulphur		Banned	Banned	Banned	
Louisiana	Lake Charles		Banned	Banned	Banned	
Maine		October 1, 2015	Banned	Banned		Statewide vaping ban. Effective October 1, 2015, vaping is prohibited in all smoke-free areas, which included bars and restaurants. Localities may regulate vaping more stringently than the state.
Maryland			Exempt	Exempt		No statewide vaping ban. Instead, vaping is prohibited only on MARC commuter rail system trains. All other indoor places, including bars and restaurants, that are subject to the Maryland Clean Indoor Air Act are entirely exempt from the state's vaping regulations. Localities may regulate vaping more stringently than the state.
Maryland	Howard County	July 31, 2015	Banned	Banned		Banned in stores, offices, sports complexes and at open-air concerts.
Maryland	Montgomery County		Banned	Banned	Exempt	
Maryland	Prince George's County		Banned	Banned	Exempt	Exempts video lottery establishments.
Maryland	Baltimore		Exempt	Exempt	Banned	also exempts video lottery facilities and e-cigarette shops.
Massachusetts						Governor Charlie Baker ordered a 4-month ban on all e-cigarette sales. This was later changed to a ban lasting indefinitely.
Massachusetts						Vaping is banned on all state college & university campuses.
Massachusetts	Acton		Banned	Banned	Banned	
Massachusetts	Adams		Banned	Banned	Banned	
Massachusetts	Amherst		Banned	Banned	Banned	
Massachusetts	Andover		Banned	Banned	Banned	
Massachusetts	Arlington		Banned	Banned	Banned	
Massachusetts	Ashland		Banned	Banned	Banned	
Massachusetts	Athol		Banned	Banned	Banned	
Massachusetts	Attleboro		Banned	Banned	Banned	
Massachusetts	Auburn		Banned	Banned	Banned	
Massachusetts	Barre		Banned	Banned	Banned	
Massachusetts	Billerica		Banned	Banned	Banned	
Massachusetts	Bolton		Banned	Banned	Banned	
Massachusetts	Boston		Banned	Banned	Banned	
Massachusetts	Bourne		Banned	Banned	Banned	
Massachusetts	Bridgewater		Banned	Banned	Banned	
Massachusetts	Buckland		Banned	Banned	Banned	
Massachusetts	Burlington		Banned	Banned	Banned	
Massachusetts	Cambridge		Banned	Banned	Banned	Exempts Housing Authority developments & outdoor restaurant & bar patios.
Massachusetts	Charlemont		Banned	Banned	Banned	
Massachusetts	Cohasset		Banned	Banned	Banned	
Massachusetts	Concord		Banned	Banned	Banned	
Massachusetts	Dartmouth		Banned	Banned	Banned	
Massachusetts	Dedham		Banned	Banned	Banned	
Massachusetts	Deerfield		Banned	Banned	Banned	
Massachusetts	Dighton		Banned	Banned	Banned	
Massachusetts	Dover		Banned	Banned	Exempt	
Massachusetts	Dracut		Banned	Banned	Banned	
Massachusetts	Eastham		Banned	Banned	Banned	
Massachusetts	Easthampton		Banned	Banned	Banned	
Massachusetts	Fairhaven		Banned	Banned	Banned	
Massachusetts	Fitchburg		Banned	Banned	Banned	
Massachusetts	Foxborough		Banned	Banned	Banned	
Massachusetts	Franklin		Banned	Banned	Banned	
Massachusetts	Gardner		Banned	Banned	Banned	
Massachusetts	Gill		Banned	Banned	Banned	
Massachusetts	Gloucester		Banned	Banned	Banned	
Massachusetts	Grafton		Banned	Banned	Banned	
Massachusetts	Granby		Banned	Banned	Banned	
Massachusetts	Great Barrington		Banned	Banned	Banned	
Massachusetts	Greenfield		Banned	Banned	Banned	
Massachusetts	Halifax		Banned	Banned	Banned	
Massachusetts	Hamilton		Banned	Banned	Banned	
Massachusetts	Hatfield		Banned	Banned	Banned	Exempts hotels/motels
Massachusetts	Haverhill		Banned	Banned	Banned	
Massachusetts	Holyoke		Banned	Banned	Banned	
Massachusetts	Hubbardston		Banned	Banned	Banned	
Massachusetts	Hudson		Banned	Banned	Banned	
Massachusetts	Hull		Banned	Banned	Banned	
Massachusetts	Lee		Banned	Banned	Banned	
Massachusetts	Leicester		Banned	Banned	Banned	
Massachusetts	Lenox		Banned	Banned	Banned	
Massachusetts	Leominster		Banned	Banned	Banned	
Massachusetts	Leverett		Banned	Banned	Banned	
Massachusetts	Lexington		Banned	Banned	Banned	
Massachusetts	Lynn		Banned	Banned	Banned	
Massachusetts	Lynnfield		Banned	Banned	Banned	
Massachusetts	Marblehead		Banned	Banned	Banned	
Massachusetts	Marion		Banned	Banned	Banned	
Massachusetts	Marlborough		Banned	Banned	Banned	
Massachusetts	Marshfield		Banned	Banned	Banned	
Massachusetts	Mashpee		Banned	Banned	Banned	
Massachusetts	Medfield		Banned	Banned	Banned	
Massachusetts	Medway		Banned	Banned	Banned	
Massachusetts	Methuen		Banned	Banned	Banned	
Massachusetts	Milford		Banned	Banned	Banned	
Massachusetts	Montague		Banned	Banned	Banned	
Massachusetts	Natick		Banned	Banned	Banned	
Massachusetts	Needham		Banned	Banned	Banned	
Massachusetts	New Bedford		Banned	Banned	Banned	
Massachusetts	Newburyport		Banned	Banned	Banned	
Massachusetts	Newton		Banned	Banned	Banned	
Massachusetts	Northampton		Banned	Banned	Banned	
Massachusetts	North Andover		Banned	Banned	Banned	
Massachusetts	North Attleborough		Banned	Banned	Banned	
Massachusetts	North Reading		Banned	Banned	Banned	
Massachusetts	Orange		Banned	Banned	Banned	
Massachusetts	Orleans		Banned	Banned	Banned	
Massachusetts	Oxford		Banned	Banned	Banned	
Massachusetts	Pittsfield		Banned	Banned	Banned	
Massachusetts	Plainville		Banned	Banned	Banned	
Massachusetts	Provincetown		Banned	Banned	Banned	
Massachusetts	Reading		Banned	Banned	Banned	
Massachusetts	Rockland	September 3, 2015	Banned	Banned	Banned	
Massachusetts	Salem		Banned	Banned	Banned	
Massachusetts	Saugus		Banned	Banned	Banned	
Massachusetts	Sharon		Banned	Banned	Banned	
Massachusetts	Shelburne		Banned	Banned	Banned	
Massachusetts	Sherborn		Banned	Banned	Banned	
Massachusetts	Shrewsbury		Banned	Banned	Banned	
Massachusetts	Somerset		Banned	Banned	Banned	
Massachusetts	Somerville		Banned	Banned	Banned	
Massachusetts	South Hadley		Banned	Banned	Banned	
Massachusetts	Stockbridge		Banned	Banned	Banned	
Massachusetts	Sunderland		Banned	Banned	Banned	
Massachusetts	Sutton		Banned	Banned	Banned	
Massachusetts	Swampscott		Banned	Banned	Banned	
Massachusetts	Swansea		Banned	Banned	Banned	
Massachusetts	Taunton		Banned	Banned	Banned	
Massachusetts	Tewksbury		Banned	Banned	Banned	
Massachusetts	Townsend		Banned	Banned	Banned	
Massachusetts	Tynsborough		Banned	Banned	Banned	
Massachusetts	Wakefield		Banned	Banned	Banned	
Massachusetts	Watertown		Banned	Banned	Banned	
Massachusetts	Wayland		Banned	Banned	Banned	
Massachusetts	Webster		Banned	Banned	Banned	
Massachusetts	Wendell		Banned	Banned	Banned	
Massachusetts	West Springfield		Banned	Banned	Banned	
Massachusetts	Westminster		Banned	Banned	Banned	
Massachusetts	Westport		Banned	Banned	Banned	
Massachusetts	Westwood		Banned	Banned	Banned	
Massachusetts	Weymouth		Banned	Banned	Banned	
Massachusetts	Whately		Banned	Banned	Banned	
Massachusetts	Williamstown		Banned	banned	Banned	
Massachusetts	Winchendon		Banned	Banned	Banned	
Massachusetts	Winchester		Banned	Banned	Banned	
Massachusetts	Worcester		Banned	Banned	Banned	
Massachusetts	Yarmouth		Banned	Banned	Banned	
Michigan						
Michigan	Washtenaw County		Exempt	Exempt	Banned	and is not illegal to use a "vaporizer" inside of domestic homes, houses, etc.
Michigan	Canton					Use of electronic cigarettes by minors is a misdemeanor.
Michigan	Eaton Rapids					Use of electronic cigarettes by minors is a civil infraction.
Michigan	Hastings					Use of electronic cigarettes by minors is a civil infraction.
Michigan	Port Huron					Use or possession of e-cigarettes, Vapor Products, or Alternative Nicotine Products by minors is a misdemeanor. Also prohibited is the sale or furnishing of said items to minors. Smoking for any purposes outside of the cooking of food is not allowed in city parks or beaches.
Minnesota			Exempt	Exempt		No statewide vaping ban. Instead, vaping is prohibited only in state and local government buildings, facilities of state colleges and universities, facilities licensed by Commissioner of Human Services, and facilities licensed by Commissioner of Health. All other indoor places subject to the Minnesota Clean Indoor Air Act, including bars and restaurants, are entirely exempt from the state's regulation. Localities may regulate vaping more stringently than the state.
Minnesota	Austin		Banned	Banned	Banned	use of vaporized medical marijuana permitted wherever not prohibited by State law.
Minnesota	Beltrami County		Banned	Banned	Banned	Exempts e-cigarette shops for purposes of sampling non-nicotine substances.
Minnesota	Big Stone County		Banned	Banned	Banned	
Minnesota	Bloomington		Banned	Banned	Banned	
Minnesota	Chippewa County		Banned	Banned	Banned	
Minnesota	Clay County		Banned	Banned	Banned	
Minnesota	Duluth		Banned	Banned	Banned	
Minnesota	Eagle Lake		Banned	Banned	Banned	
Minnesota	Eden Prairie		Banned	Banned	Banned	
Minnesota	Edina		Banned	Banned	Exempt	
Minnesota	Elk River		Banned	Banned	Banned	
Minnesota	Ely		Banned	Banned	Banned	
Minnesota	Glyndon		Banned	Banned	Banned	
Minnesota	Hennepin County		Banned	Banned	Banned	
Minnesota	Hermantown		Banned	Banned	Banned	
Minnesota	Houston County		Banned	Banned	Banned	
Minnesota	Isanti		Banned	Banned	Banned	
Minnesota	Jordan		Banned	Banned	Eexempt	
Minnesota	Lac qui Parle County		Banned	Banned	Banned	
Minnesota	Lakeville		Banned	Banned	Banned	
Minnesota	Mankato		Banned	Banned	Banned	
Minnesota	Marshall County		Banned	Banned	Banned	
Minnesota	Minneapolis		Banned	Banned	Banned	
Minnesota	Moorhead		Banned	Banned	Banned	
Minnesota	North Mankato		Banned	Banned	Banned	
Minnesota	Olmsted County		Banned	Banned	Banned	Use of vaporized medical marijuana permitted wherever not prohibited by law.
Minnesota	Orono		Banned	Banned	Banned	
Minnesota	Perham		Banned	Banned	Banned	
Minnesota	Ramsey County		Banned	Banned	Banned	
Minnesota	Red Wing		Banned	Banned	Banned	
Minnesota	Richfield		Banned	Banned	Banned	
Minnesota	Savage		Banned	Banned	Banned	
Minnesota	Sleepy Eye		Banned	Banned	Banned	
Minnesota	St. Anthony		Banned	Banned	Banned	
Minnesota	St. Louis County		Banned	Banned	Banned	
Minnesota	Steele County		Banned	Banned	Banned	
Minnesota	Waseca		Banned	Banned	Banned	
Minnesota	Wilkin County		Banned	Banned	Banned	
Mississippi						
Mississippi	Anguilla		Banned	Banned	Banned	
Mississippi	Arcola		Banned	Banned	Banned	
Mississippi	Baldwyn		Banned	Banned	Banned	
Mississippi	Bassfield		Banned	Banned	Banned	
Mississippi	Beulah		Banned	Banned	Banned	
Mississippi	Brandon		Banned	Banned	Banned	
Mississippi	Bruce		Banned	Banned	Banned	
Mississippi	Byram		Banned	Banned	Banned	
Mississippi	Calhoun City		Banned	Banned	Banned	
Mississippi	Clinton			Banned	Exempt	
Mississippi	Centreville		Banned	Banned	Banned	
Mississippi	Coahoma County		Banned	Banned	Banned	
Mississippi	Courtland		Banned	Banned	Banned	
Mississippi	Crawford		Banned	Banned	Banned	
Mississippi	Duck Hill		Banned	Banned	Banned	
Mississippi	Duncan		Banned	Banned	Banned	
Mississippi	Durant		Banned	Banned	Banned	
Mississippi	Ethel		Banned	Banned	Banned	
Mississippi	Farmington		Banned	Banned	Banned	
Mississippi	Fayette		Banned	Banned	Banned	
Mississippi	Forest		Banned	Banned	Banned	
Mississippi	Friars Point		Banned	Banned	Banned	
Mississippi	Georgetown		Banned	Banned	Banned	
Mississippi	Holly Springs		Banned	Banned	Banned	
Mississippi	Indianola		Banned	Banned	Banned	
Mississippi	Isola		Banned	Banned	Banned	
Mississippi	Itta Bena		Banned	Banned	Banned	
Mississippi	Iuka		Banned	Banned	Banned	
Mississippi	Louisville		Banned	Banned	Banned	
Mississippi	Magee		Banned	Banned	Banned	
Mississippi	Mantachie		Banned	Banned	Banned	
Mississippi	Mendenhall		Banned	Banned	Banned	
Mississippi	Monticello			Banned	Exempt	
Mississippi	Moorhead		Banned	Banned	Banned	
Mississippi	Nettleton	February 5, 2015	Banned	Banned	Banned	
Mississippi	New Augusta		Banned	Banned	Banned	
Mississippi	Petal		Banned	Banned	Banned	
Mississippi	Pickens		Banned	Banned	Banned	
Mississippi	Pittsboro		Banned	Banned	Banned	
Mississippi	Plantersville		Banned	Banned	Banned	
Mississippi	Prentiss		Banned	Banned	Banned	
Mississippi	Rolling Fork		Banned	Banned	Banned	
Mississippi	Sidon		Banned	Banned	Banned	
Mississippi	Sledge	June 4, 2014	Banned	Banned	Banned	
Mississippi	Southaven	August 4, 2014	Banned	Banned	Banned	
Mississippi	State Line		Banned	Banned	Banned	
Mississippi	Sumner		Banned	Banned	Banned	
Mississippi	Tupelo		Banned	Banned	Banned	
Mississippi	Tutwiler		Banned	Banned	Banned	
Mississippi	Walnut		Banned	Banned	Banned	
Mississippi	Walnut Grove		Banned	Banned	Banned	
Mississippi	Weir		Banned	Banned	Banned	
Mississippi	Wesson		Banned	Banned	Banned	
Mississippi	Wiggins		Banned	Banned	Banned	
Mississippi	Woodville		Banned	Banned	Banned	
Mississippi	Diamondhead		Exempt	Banned	Banned	
Mississippi	Flowood		Exempt	Banned	Banned	
Missouri						
Missouri	Branson	July 1, 2015				Banned in all enclosed public places and workplaces by unanimous Board of Aldermen vote in October 2014; exempts up to 20% of designated hotel and motel smoking rooms, tobacco shops, smoking lounges in tobacco-related businesses, private homes, outdoor areas in places of employment, outdoor patios of restaurants, and golf courses.
Missouri	Clinton	March 1, 2015	Banned	Banned	Banned	
Missouri	Columbia		Banned	Banned	Banned	Banned in all workplaces, including bars and restaurants; exempts rented social halls, separately ventilated offices occupied exclusively by smokers, stage performances, retail tobacco shops, and private clubs with no employees.
Missouri	Creve Coeur	January 2, 2011	Banned	Banned		Banned by unanimous city council vote in all enclosed workplaces, including bars and restaurants; exempts cigar bars, private clubs, tobacco shops, and hotel/motel designated smoking rooms.
Missouri	Farmington	November 13, 2015	Banned	Banned	Banned	After public vote of 59%-41% and including within 15 feet (4.6 m) of entrances; exempts cigar bars, vape shops, hotel rooms, private clubs, and nursing homes.
Missouri	Gainesville		Banned	Banned	Banned	
Missouri	Kansas City		Banned	Banned		Banned in all indoor workplaces, including bars and restaurants
Missouri	St. Joseph	June 7, 2014	Banned		Banned	Banned in public places, including all bars, restaurants, and private and semiprivate rooms in nursing homes, after public vote of 52.75%–47.25%; exempts private vehicles and residences, 10% of hotel and motel rooms designated as smoking, private clubs (when no employees are present), and casino gaming areas (including bars, restaurants, and lounges within those gaming areas). Though the city-wide smoking ban remains intact, the vaping ban itself was lifted in 2016 due to a state law which was passed then, prohibiting e-cigarettes and vape products from being regulated in the same way as tobacco. In 2019 the city-wide vaping ban was reinstated, via a separate ordinance, by a unanimous vote from the City Council.
Missouri	Washington	April 15, 2013	Banned	Banned	Banned	By unanimous city council vote; also banned in private rooms in nursing homes; exempts only private residences not serving as a workplace and designated smoking rooms in hotels and motels; exempts hookah lounges until April 15, 2014.
Montana		October 22, 2019				Montana governor Steve Bullock announced a statewide ban on the sale of flavored vaping products. This ban will take effect on October 22, 2019, and will affect both retail in shops and online. The restriction will last for 4 months.
New Hampshire					Banned	Statewide vaping ban. Smoking is defined as having a lit cigarette, pipe, or any device designed to produce the effect of smoking, including devices as defined in RSA 126-K:2, II-a. Devices may include, but are not limited to, hookahs, e-cigarettes, e-cigars, e-pipes, e-hookahs, and vape pens. The Indoor Smoking Act clarifies that all tobacco products are prohibited in enclosed workplaces and enclosed places accessible to the public.
New Jersey		March 13, 2010	Banned	Banned	Banned	Statewide vaping ban. On March 13, 2010, a law went into effect prohibited vaping everywhere that smoking is banned, which is in all enclosed workplaces, including bars and restaurants. Localities may regulate vaping more stringently. (NJ Title 26:3D-55 - 60)
New Mexico						
New Mexico	Santa Fe		Banned	Banned	Banned	
New Mexico	Carlsbad		Exempt	Exempt	Banned	
New York		November 22, 2017	Banned	Banned	Banned	Statewide vaping ban. On November 22, 2017, a law went into effect prohibiting vaping everywhere that smoking is banned, including all enclosed workplaces, bars and restaurants.
New York	Albany		Banned	Banned	Banned	
New York	Cattaraugus County		Banned	Banned	Exempt	
New York	Lynbrook		Banned	Banned	Exempt	
New York	New York City					Prohibited to anyone under 21 years of age; also prohibited everywhere smoking is banned indoors and out; vaping is allowed only in e-cigarette shops.
New York	Suffolk County					Prohibited to anyone under 21 years of age; also prohibited everywhere smoking is banned indoors and out.
New York	Tompkins County		Banned	Banned	Banned	
New York	Westchester County		Banned	Banned	Banned	
New York	Broome County, New York					Banned in and near county buildings.
North Carolina			Exempt	Exempt		Localities may regulate vaping indoors, but not in bars and restaurants.
North Carolina	Asheville	March 10, 2015				Banned from city buses, parks and greenways and in facilities such as the U.S. Cellular Center.
North Carolina	Waynesville	May 23, 2015				Banned on sidewalks, public parks, parking lots, greenways, city vehicles and the area in and surrounding town buildings.
North Dakota		December 2012	Banned	Banned		Statewide vaping ban. On November 6, 2012, by a vote of 66%-34%, North Dakota voters ratified Initiative Measure Four, which, upon taking effect in December 2012, amends North Dakota's existing partial smoking ban so as to ban smoking statewide in all enclosed public places and places of employment, including all bars, restaurants, and tobacco stores with all restrictions applying to e-cigarettes as well. The ban exempts only (1) private residences except when operating as a childcare or adult day care facility, (2) outdoor areas except within 20 feet of the entrance to a public place or place of employment, (3) businesses not open to the public with no employees besides the owner, and (4) American Indian religious and cultural rituals. Local governments may regulate vaping more stringently than the state.
Ohio		September 30, 2021	Banned	Banned		Statewide vaping ban: Effective September 30, 2021, according to Chapter 3794 of the Ohio Revised Code, vaping is prohibited in all places where smoking is prohibited (which includes bars and restaurants), with the exception of retail establishments that make at least 80% of their gross revenue from the sale of vaping products.
Oklahoma						No statewide vaping ban. Instead, vaping is only prohibited in all Dept. of Corrections facilities, including vehicles and grounds. Localities are prohibited from regulating vaping more stringently than the state. Also, sales, gifts and furnishing of vapor products to persons under the age of 18 are subject to legal action the same way as if it were alcohol to a person under 21.
Oregon		January 1, 2016	Banned	Banned		Statewide vaping ban: Effective January 1, 2016, vaping is prohibited in all smoke free areas, which includes bars and restaurants. Localities may regulate vaping more stringently than the state. On October 4, 2019, Oregon Governor Kate Brown issued a 180-day ban on the sale of flavored vapes.
Pennsylvania						
Pennsylvania	Philadelphia				Banned	exempting bars where food accounts for less than 10% of sales and alcohol accounts for more than 90% of sales, and persons under 18 are prohibited.
Rhode Island						Statewide vaping ban: Use of electronic nicotine delivery systems included in definition of “smoking” and prohibited in same places smoking is prohibited (23 R.I. Gen. Laws Ann. §§ 23-20.10-2(19) (2018) (definition of smoking)), including public places, health care facilities, child and adult day care facilities, common areas of multi-unit housing (more than 4 units), public transportation, schools and indoor and outdoor sports arenas (23 R.I. Gen. Laws Ann. § 23-20.10-3 (2018)); workplaces (23 R.I. Gen. Laws Ann. § 23-20.10-4 (2018)), with some exceptions (23 R.I. Gen. Laws Ann. §§ 23-20.10-6; 23–20.10-6.1(2018)). Possession and use of e-cigarettes, including by visitors, prohibited in all Rhode Island Department of Corrections facilities, vehicles and property. 240-20 R.I. Code R. §§ 1.6(D), 1.16(D) (2018).
South Carolina						
South Carolina	Denmark		Banned	Banned	Banned	
South Carolina	Estill	May 1, 2013	Banned	Banned	Banned	
South Carolina	Hartsville		Banned	Banned	Banned	
South Carolina	Inman		Banned	Banned	Banned	
South Carolina	West Pelzer		Banned	Banned	Banned	
South Carolina	Yemassee	August 9, 2013	Banned	Banned	Banned	
South Dakota			Exempt	Exempt		No statewide vaping ban. Instead, vaping is only prohibited in Department of Corrections facilities and on grounds thereof, by both employees and inmates. All other indoor places, including bars and restaurants, are entirely exempt from the state's regulations, and it remains unclear whether or not local government are allowed to regulate their usage more stringently.
Texas						
Texas	Austin		Banned	Banned	Banned	.
Texas	Bonham		Banned	Banned	Exempt	
Texas	Denton	April 22, 2015	Banned	Banned	Banned	Previous smoking ordinance that allowed smoking in bars did not include e-cigarettes.
Texas	Desoto	January 1, 2016	Banned	Banned	Banned	
Texas	Duncanville	May 1, 2016	Banned	Banned	Banned	
Texas	Edinburg	December 1, 2015	Banned	Banned	Banned	
Texas	El Paso		Banned	Banned	Banned	
Texas	Frisco		Banned	Banned	Banned	
Texas	Harlingen		Banned	Banned	Banned	
Texas	Laredo		Banned	Banned		Banned in all area's of the city, including bars and restaurants.
Texas	Lufkin		Banned	Banned	Banned	
Texas	San Angelo		Banned	Banned	Banned	
Texas	San Marcos		Banned	Banned	Banned	
Texas	Seagoville	March 3, 2016	Banned	Banned	Banned	
Texas	Sherman		Banned	Banned	Exempt	
Texas	Socorro		Banned	Banned	Banned	
Texas	Tyler					Banned in all places where traditional tobacco smoking is banned, all city owned property, and all privately owned bars and restaurants. Exemptions are available for retail tobacco and vaping shops
Texas	Waco	January 1, 2016	Banned	Banned	Banned	
Texas	Waxahachie		Banned	Banned	Banned	
Texas	Bedford		Exempt	Banned	Exempt	
Texas	Boerne		Exempt	Banned	Exempt	
Texas	Burkburnett		Exempt	Banned	Banned	
Texas	Highland Village Texas	June 1, 2011				Banned in all enclosed public places as well as restaurants; the law is silent as to whether or not bars are included.
Texas	Joshua					Banned in all enclosed public places as well as restaurants; the law is silent as to whether or not bars are included.
Texas	Weatherford		Exempt	Banned	Exempt	
Texas	Wichita Falls		Exempt	Exempt	Banned	
Utah		January 1, 2011				Statewide vaping ban: Effective January 1, 2011, vaping is prohibited in all indoor places exempting only (1) designated hotel/motel smoking rooms, (2) areas of owner-operated businesses with no employees besides the owner, and (3) American Indian religious and cultural ceremonies. Since the state law supersedes any ordinances passed by political subdivisions of the state (i.e., cities, counties, school districts, agencies, etc.), such political subdivisions are preempted from regulating indoor smoking or vaping any more or less stringently than the Act.[401]
Vermont		January 1, 2017				Statewide vaping ban: Effective January 1, 2017, vaping is prohibited in public areas where smoking is banned.
Virginia						No statewide vaping ban. Instead, vaping is prohibited on Virginia Railway Express trains, all northern schools, and limited to 100 feet on north end of station platforms. All other indoor places can freely permit vaping if they choose. The law is silent as to whether local governments can regulate vaping more stringently than the state, since they are forbidden from regulating smoking more stringently.
Washington						No statewide vaping ban. Washington State Ferries forbids vaping on its vessels as per an announcement given on every sailing. A 4-month ban on flavored vaping products was enacted in October 2019.
Washington	Grant County		Banned	Banned	Banned	vaping is allowed only in e-cigarette shops.
Washington	King County		Banned	Banned	Banned	
Washington	Pasco		Banned	Banned	Banned	
Washington	Pierce County		Banned	Banned	Banned	
Washington	Snohomish County					Banned 25 feet from public places and enclosed areas and outdoor venues. Only tribal businesses on reservation land and permitted vape product retail shops are exempted per section 14.7 of Health District Sanitary Code 13.2 and 14.6.
Washington	Whatcom County		Banned	Banned	Banned	
West Virginia						
West Virginia	Barbour County		Banned	Banned	Banned	
West Virginia	Berkeley County		Banned	Banned	Banned	
West Virginia	Brooke County		Banned	Banned	Banned	
West Virginia	Calhoun County		Banned	Banned	Banned	
West Virginia	Grant County		Banned	Banned	Banned	
West Virginia	Greenbrier County		Banned	Banned	Banned	
West Virginia	Hampshire County		Banned	Banned	Banned	
West Virginia	Hancock County		Banned	Banned	Banned	
West Virginia	Lewis County		Banned	Banned	Banned	
West Virginia	Mason County		Banned	Banned	Banned	
West Virginia	Mineral County		Banned	Banned	Banned	
West Virginia	Monroe County		Banned	Banned	Banned	
West Virginia	Nicholas County		Banned	Banned	Banned	
West Virginia	Ohio County		Banned	Banned	Banned	
West Virginia	Pleasants County		Banned	Banned	Banned	
West Virginia	Preston County		Banned	Banned	Banned	
West Virginia	Randolph County		Banned	Banned	Banned	
West Virginia	Ritchie County		Banned	Banned	Banned	
West Virginia	Roane County		Banned	Banned	Banned	
West Virginia	Taylor County		Banned	Banned	Banned	
West Virginia	Tucker County		Banned	Banned	Banned	
West Virginia	Upshur County		Banned	Banned	Banned	
West Virginia	Wirt County		Banned	Banned	Banned	
West Virginia	Wood County		Banned	Banned	Banned	
West Virginia	Marshall County		Exempt	Banned	Exempt	
West Virginia	Mercer County		Exempt	Banned	Banned	
West Virginia	Morgan County		Exempt	Banned	Banned	
West Virginia	Webster County		Exempt	Banned	Banned	
West Virginia	Wyoming County				Banned	
Wisconsin		September 1, 2025				Active statewide vaping ban. As of September 1st, 2025 all sales of any non-registered and FDA approved regulated nicotine vaping products are banned. No businesses are permitted to sell any non-approved nicotine vaping devices, atomizers or liquids. The WI DOR (Wisconsin Department of Revenue) official website has an active and daily updated list of approved products.
Wisconsin	Ashwaubenon		Banned	Banned	Banned	
Wisconsin	Dane County		Banned	Banned	Banned	
Wisconsin	Florence County		Banned	Banned	Banned	
Wisconsin	Greenfield		Banned	Banned	Banned	
Wisconsin	Janesville		Banned	Banned	Banned	
Wisconsin	Jefferson County		Banned	Banned	Banned	
Wisconsin	La Crosse County		Banned	Banned	Banned	
Wisconsin	Madison		Banned	Banned	Banned	Vaping is only allowed in retail e-cigarette shops.
Wisconsin	Milwaukee		Banned	Banned	Banned	
Wisconsin	Onalaska		Banned	Banned	Banned	
Wisconsin	Superior		Banned	Banned	Banned	Superior smoke shops and dispensaries also faces heavy suppression from the local government.
Wisconsin	Wausau		Banned	Banned	Banned	
Wyoming						
Wyoming	Laramie		Banned	Banned	Exempt	ban includes private clubs.

== See also ==
- Tobacco 21
