= N-malonylurea hydrolase =

Class of enzymes

Identifiers
- EC no.: 3.5.1.95

Databases
- BRENDA: enzyme data
- ExPASy: NiceZyme view
- KEGG: enzyme entry
- MetaCyc: metabolic pathway
- Rhea: reactions
- PDB structures: RCSB PDB PDBe PDBsum
Search
- PMC: articles
- PubMed: articles
- NCBI: proteins

N-malonylurea hydrolase (EC 3.5.1.95) is an enzyme characterised from the bacterium, Rhodococcus erythropolis that catalyzes the hydrolysis of 3-oxo-3-ureidopropanoic acid to malonic acid and urea:

3-oxo-3-ureidopropanoic acid
H_{2}O
malonic acid
+
urea

The reaction is part of a pathway for catabolism of the pyrimidines uracil and thymine. Earlier steps involve the enzymes uracil/thymine dehydrogenase and barbiturase.

This enzyme is a hydrolase, one acting on carbon-nitrogen bonds other than peptide bonds, specifically in linear amides. The systematic name of this enzyme class is 3-oxo-3-ureidopropanoate amidohydrolase (urea- and malonate-forming). This enzyme is also called ureidomalonase.
