= MENC =

MENC may refer to:

- National Association for Music Education, formerly known as the Music Educators National Conference
- o-Succinylbenzoate synthase, an enzyme
- Methyl isocyanide, an organic compound
