= Barbiturase =

Class of enzymes

Identifiers
- EC no.: 3.5.2.1
- CAS no.: 9025-16-5

Databases
- BRENDA: enzyme data
- ExPASy: NiceZyme view
- KEGG: enzyme entry
- MetaCyc: metabolic pathway
- Rhea: reactions
- PDB structures: RCSB PDB PDBe PDBsum
Search
- PMC: articles
- PubMed: articles
- NCBI: proteins

Barbiturase (EC 3.5.2.1) is a zinc-containing amidohydrolase. Its systemic name is barbiturate amidohydrolase (3-oxo-3-ureidopropanoate-forming). Barbiturase acts as a catalyst in the second step of oxidative pyrimidine degradation, promoting the ring-opening hydrolysis of barbituric acid to ureidomalonic acid. Although grouped into the naturally existing amidohydrolases, it demonstrates more homology with cyanuric acid amidohydrolase. Therefore, it has been proposed that barbiturase, along with that enzyme, should be grouped into a new family.

== Background ==
Barbiturase consists of four identical subunits, each bound to a zinc (Zn) atom. Absorption spectrum analysis illustrates that zinc is the only cofactor present in barbiturase. Unlike other zinc containing amidohydrolases, the zinc binding motif of barbiturase is found on the carboxylic acid terminus, specifically at amino acids 320 to 324. Several highly conserved histidine residues were found in the zinc binding motif region of barbiturase, suggesting that histidine residues are involved in zinc binding and are necessary for the catalytic activity of barbiturase. Experiments have shown that barbiturase is sensitive to metal ion chelators. Finally, barbiturase activity can be blocked upon addition of other metal ions, such as copper and mercury.

The molecular weight of barbiturase is 172000 kD. Its Km is 1.0 mM. Its Vmax is 2.5 μmol/min/mg. The highest enzymatic activity of barbiturase is at pH 8 and 40-45 °C. Above 55 °C barbiturase loses its activity.

== Reaction ==
barbituric acid
H_{2}O
H_{2}O
3-oxo-3-ureidopropanoic acid

The equilibrium of the reaction favors the formation of barbituric acid. Barbiturase is very specific to barbituric acid and will not react with derivatives. Urea, malonate, and cyanuric acid inhibit the hydrolysis of barbituric acid. Dihydro-L-orotate is an intermediate in the pyrimidine biosynthesis pathway and competitively inhibits barbiturase. In addition, barbituric acid inhibits multiple enzymes that are involved in de novo pyrimidine synthesis. These last two points suggest a connection between pyrimidine anabolism and oxidative catabolism.

Barbiturase activity or the existence of oxidative pyrimidine metabolism has not yet been discovered in mammals.
