= Auguste Georges Darzens =

French chemist (1867–1954)

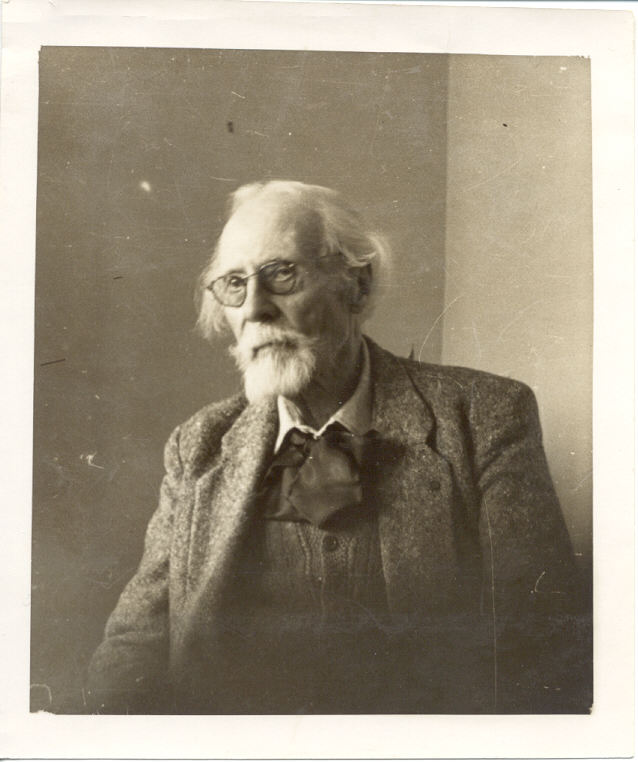
Auguste Georges Darzens

Auguste Georges Darzens (12 July 1867 in Moscow, Russia – 10 September 1954) was a Russian-born French organic chemist.

== Biography ==
From 1886 he studied at the École Polytechnique in Paris under Louis Édouard Grimaux. In 1895 he received his agrégation in physics and in 1899 his medical doctorate. From 1913 to 1937, he was a professor of chemistry at the École Polytechnique. In the meantime, from 1897 to 1920, he served as director of a research laboratory at LT Piver, a perfumery outfit.

In 1904, he discovered the Darzens reaction, a chemical reaction also known as the Darzens condensation and Darzens glycidic ester condensation. Other reactions named after him include the Darzens tetralin synthesis, Darzens halogenation and the Darzens synthesis of unsaturated ketones.

His book, "Initiation chimique" (1909), was translated into English in 1913 and published with the title of "Chemistry".

== See also ==
- Darzens reaction
