= Bis(trimethylsilyl)sulfur diimide =

Names
- Preferred IUPAC name Bis(trimethylsilyl)-λ^{4}-sulfanediimine

Identifiers
CAS Number	18156-25-7
3D model (JSmol)	Interactive image
ChemSpider	298617
PubChem CID	336932
CompTox Dashboard (EPA)	DTXSID00319982
- InChI: InChI=1S/C6H18N2SSi2/c1-10(2,3)7-9-8-11(4,5)6/h1-6H3 Key: JPAGRRHKURYWAM-UHFFFAOYSA-N
- SMILES: C[Si](C)(C)N=S=N[Si](C)(C)C

Properties
Chemical formula	C_{6}H_{18}N_{2}SSi_{2}
Molar mass	206.45 g·mol^{−1}
Appearance	colorless liquid
Density	0.877 g/cm^{3}
Boiling point	59–61 °C (138–142 °F; 332–334 K)

Hazards
- GHS labelling
Pictograms	(GHS02: Flammable) (GHS07: Exclamation mark)
Signal word	Warning
Hazard statements	H226, H319, H335
Precautionary statements	P210, P233, P240, P241, P242, P243, P261, P264, P271, P280, P303+P361+P353, P304+P340, P305+P351+P338, P312, P337+P313, P370+P378, P403+P233, P403+P235, P405, P501
- Except where otherwise noted, data are given for materials in their standard state (at 25 °C [77 °F], 100 kPa). Infobox references

Bis(trimethylsilyl)sulfur diimide is the organosulfur compound with the formula S(NSiMe_{3})_{2} (Me = CH_{3}). A colorless liquid, it is a diaza analogue of sulfur dioxide, i.e., a sulfur diimide. It is a reagent in the synthesis of sulfur nitrides. For example, it is a precursor to C_{2}(N_{2}S)_{2}.

Bis(trimethylsilyl)sulfur diimide is prepared by the reaction of thionyl chloride and sodium bis(trimethylsilyl)amide:

SOCl_{2} + 2 NaN(SiMe_{3})_{2} → S(NSiMe_{3})_{2} + 2 NaCl + O(SiMe_{3})_{2}
