= Darzens halogenation =

Darzens halogenation is the chemical synthesis of alkyl halides from alcohols via the treatment upon reflux of a large excess of thionyl chloride or thionyl bromide (SOX_{2}) in the presence of a small amount of a nitrogen base, such as a tertiary amine or pyridine or its corresponding hydrochloride or hydrobromide salt. The reaction is named after its creator, Auguste Georges Darzens, who first reported it in 1911.

The addition of the amine and use of a large excess of the thionyl halide as compared to the usual halogenation protocol makes this reaction effective for a wide range of alcohols including those that are difficult to halogenate, such as cyclohexanol, which normally decomposes to form cyclohexene if reacted with only SOCl_{2}. The reaction takes place through an S_{N}2 mechanism but is also often used in the description of S_{N}i mechanisms.

For example, ethanol can be converted into chloroethane (X=Cl) or bromoethane (X=Br) as follows:

CH_{3}CH_{2}OH + SOX_{2} $\xrightarrow\text{pyridine}$ CH_{3}CH_{2}X + SO_{2} + HX
