= Uracil/thymine dehydrogenase =

Class of enzymes

Identifiers
- EC no.: 1.17.99.4
- CAS no.: 9029-00-9

Databases
- IntEnz: IntEnz view
- BRENDA: BRENDA entry
- ExPASy: NiceZyme view
- KEGG: KEGG entry
- MetaCyc: metabolic pathway
- PRIAM: profile
- PDB structures: RCSB PDB PDBe PDBsum
Search
- PMC: articles
- PubMed: articles
- NCBI: proteins

Uracil/thymine dehydrogenase (EC 1.17.99.4, uracil oxidase, uracil-thymine oxidase, uracil dehydrogenase) is an enzyme with systematic name uracil:acceptor oxidoreductase. This enzyme catalyses two related chemical reactions:

uracil
+ reduced
acceptor
H_{2}O
barbituric acid
+ electron
acceptor

In a similar way, thymine is converted to 5-methylbarbituric acid. The enzyme forms part of the oxidative pyrimidine-degrading pathway in some microorganisms.
