= Mandelate racemase =

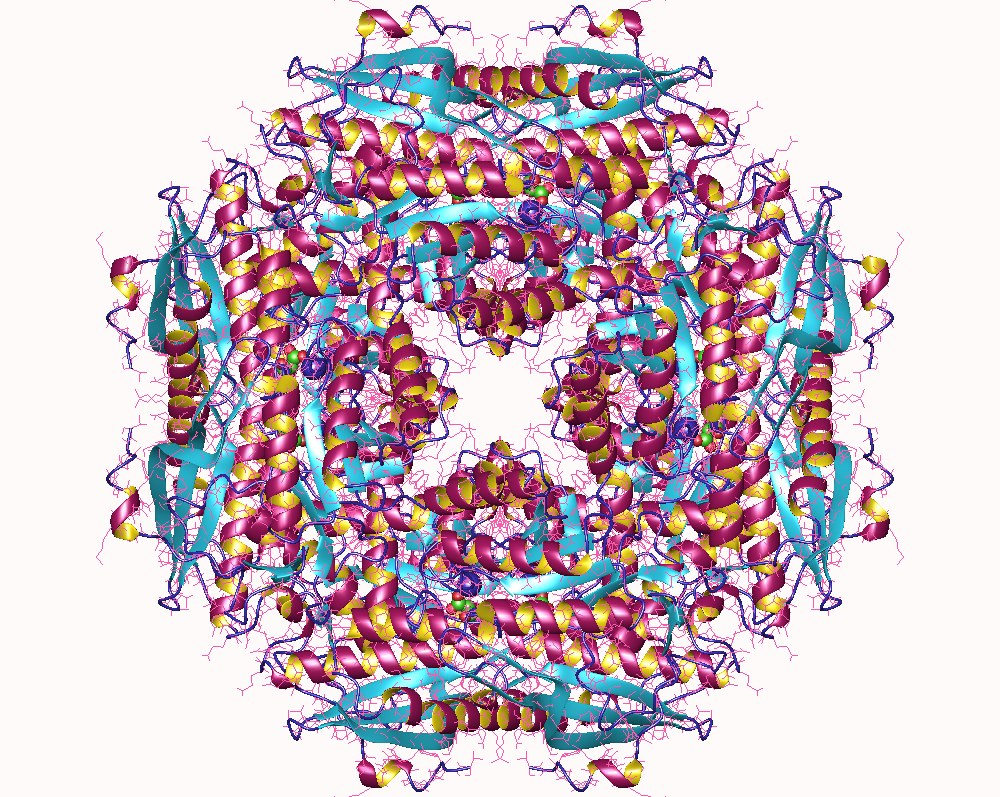
- mandelate racemase octamer, Pseudomonas putida

Identifiers
- EC no.: 5.1.2.2
- CAS no.: 2602087

Databases
- IntEnz: IntEnz view
- BRENDA: BRENDA entry
- ExPASy: NiceZyme view
- KEGG: KEGG entry
- MetaCyc: metabolic pathway
- PRIAM: profile
- PDB structures: RCSB PDB PDBe PDBsum
Search
- PMC: articles
- PubMed: articles
- NCBI: proteins

Mandelate racemase (EC 5.1.2.2) is a bacterial enzyme which catalyzes the interconversion of the enantiomers of mandelate via an enol intermediate. This enzyme catalyses the following chemical reaction

(S)-mandelate $\rightleftharpoons$ (R)-mandelate

It is a member of the enolase superfamily of enzymes, along with muconate lactonizing enzyme and enolase.
