= N-acetylglucosamine-6-phosphate deacetylase =

Class of enzymes

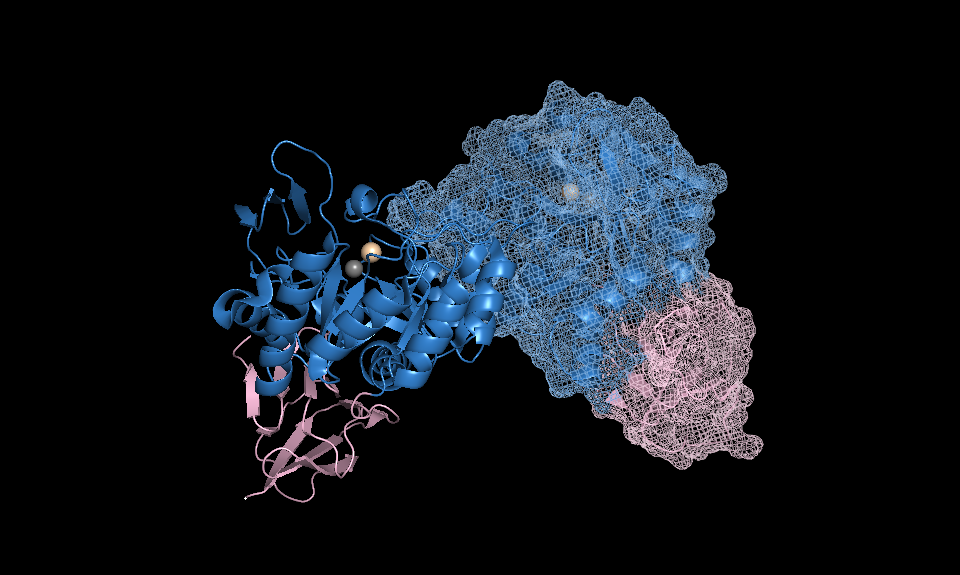
- Representation of N-acetylglucosamine-6-phosphate deacetylase in Mycobacterium smegmatis

Identifiers
- EC no.: 3.5.1.25
- CAS no.: 9027-50-3

Databases
- BRENDA: enzyme data
- ExPASy: NiceZyme view
- KEGG: enzyme entry
- MetaCyc: metabolic pathway
- Rhea: reactions
- PDB structures: RCSB PDB PDBe PDBsum
- Gene Ontology: AmiGO / QuickGO
Search
- PMC: articles
- PubMed: articles
- NCBI: proteins

N-acetylglucosamine-6-phosphate deacetylase (EC 3.5.1.25), also known as GlcNAc-6-phosphate deacetylase or NagA, is an enzyme that catalyzes the deacetylation of N-acetylglucosamine-6-phosphate (GlcNAc-6-P) to glucosamine-6-phosphate (GlcN-6-P):

N-acetyl-D-glucosamine 6-phosphate
H_{2}O
D-glucosamine 6-phosphate
+
acetic acid

GlcNAc-6-phosphate deacetylase is encoded by the gene NagA.

This enzyme belongs to the amidohydrolase superfamily. Amidohydrolases are a type of hydrolase that acts upon amide bonds. All members of the amidohydrolase family employ a TIM barrel structure, and a vast majority of members are metalloenzymes. The family of enzymes is important in amino acid and nucleotide metabolism as well as biodegradation of agricultural and industrial compounds. NagA participates in amino-sugar metabolism, specifically in the biosynthesis of amino-sugar-nucleotides.

== Structure ==
NagA is a homodimeric enzyme with two domains in each dimer of the structure. Each domain I comprises a (β/α)_{8} - barrel structural fold, also known as a TIM barrel, and contains an active site of the enzyme. Each active site consists of the catalytic site of the enzyme and the metal-binding site that are involved in substrate and metal co-factor recognition, respectively. Domain I also forms the dimeric interface with domain I of the neighboring subunit. The smaller second domain of NagA enzymes comprises a β-barrel, which potentially acts to stabilize the enzyme. While all members of the amidohydrolase superfamily employ a TIM-barrel structural fold, NagA in Escherichia coli (EcNagA) has a pseudo-TIM barrel enclosing the funnel-like catalytic site of the enzyme. The dimer structure of NagA is considered crucial for the activity and thermostability of the enzyme.

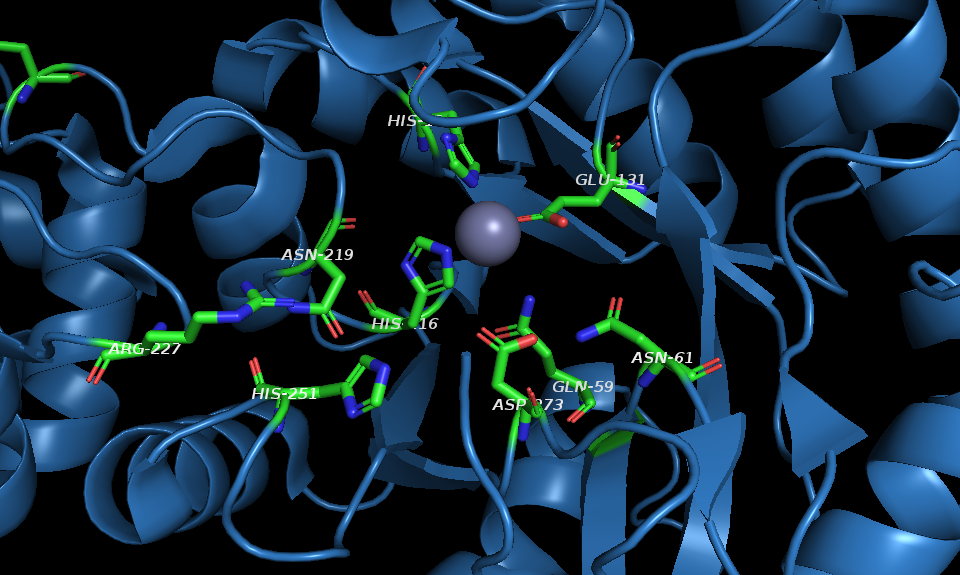
The active site of NagA in E.coli; E.coli has a mononuclear metal-binding site with a Zn^{2+} ion.

=== Metal-binding site ===
Amidohydrolase enzymes can bind one, two, or three metal atoms in the active site. These metals can include Zn^{2+}, Co^{2+}, Fe^{2+}, Cd^{2+}, and others. EcNagA contains a mononuclear metal-binding site with a Zn^{2+} ion; in addition, EcNagA shows a phosphate ion bound at the metal-binding site. Unlike EcNagA, NagA of Mycobacterium smegmatis (MSNagA) and Bacillus subtilis (BsNagA) have binuclear metal-binding sites. MSNagA has two divalent metal ions located in each active site, which are both required for efficient catalysis and structural stability. While most other bacteria species use Zn as their metal co-factor, BsNagA utilizes iron as the predominant metal in the metal-binding site.

=== Catalytic-binding site ===
Most of the active site residues of EcNagA and BsNagA are conserved and share similar structural positions. A notable difference between mycobacterial NagA enzymes and NagA enzymes from other bacterial species is the presence of a cysteine at position 131. Other bacterial species have a lysine residue at this position. This cysteine is located in the flexible loop, which prevents the physiological substrate from binding.

== Mechanism ==
The catalytic mechanism for NagA enzymes proposed utilizes nucleophilic attack via a metal-coordinated water molecule or hydroxide ion. The mechanism proceeds via a strictly conserved active-site aspartic acid residue (Asp-273) that acts initially as a base to activate the hydrolytic water molecule in order to attack the carbonyl group of the substrate. Asp-273 then acts as an acid to protonate the amine leaving group. One proposed mechanism using the BsNagA and its two iron co-factors in the metal-binding site demonstrates the nucleophilic attack by an Fe-bridged hydroxide and then the stabilization of the carbonyl oxygen by one of the two Fe atoms.

== Biological Function ==
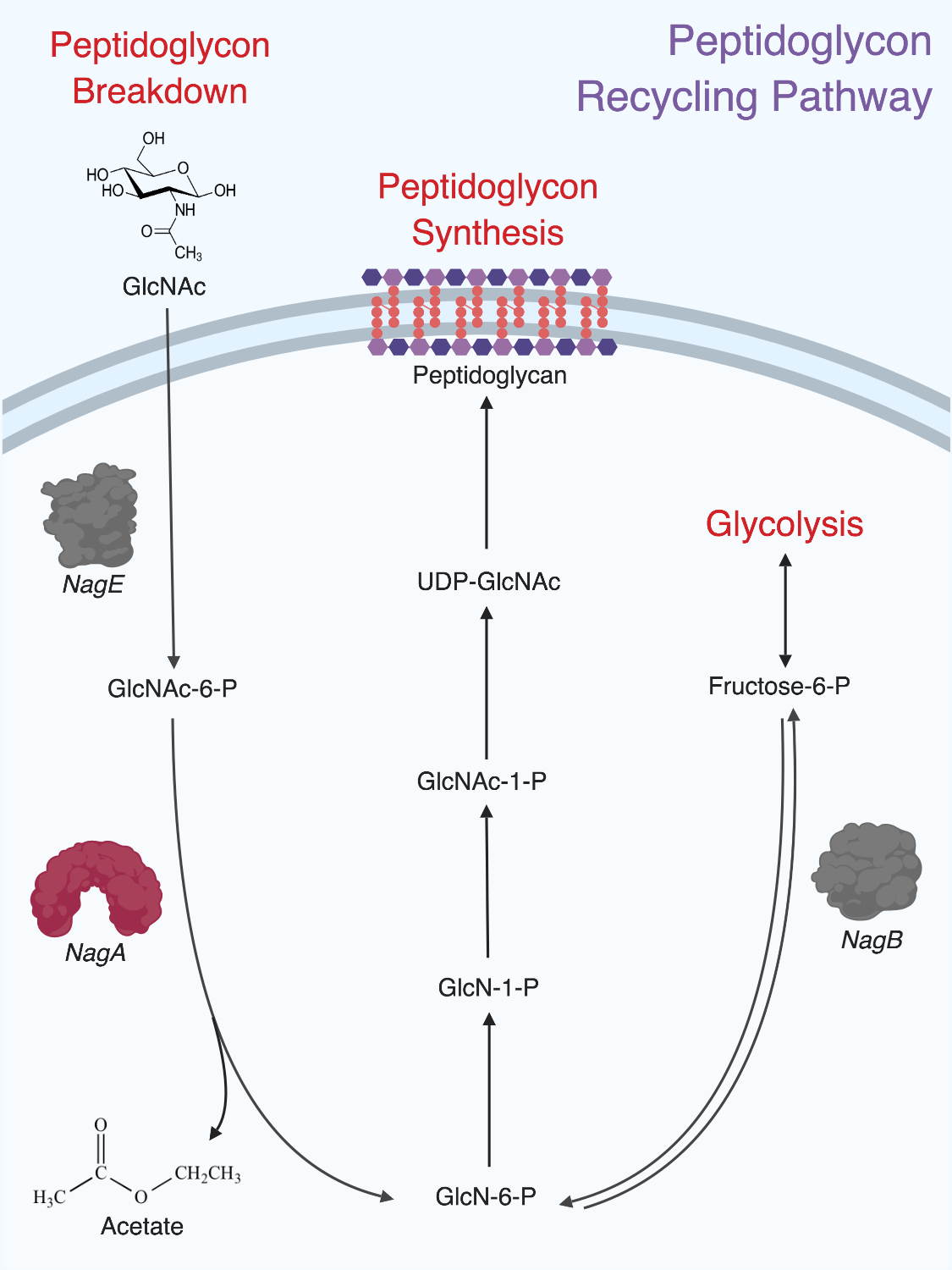
NagA Pathway in Bacteria

NagA is located in the cytoplasm of the cell. N-acetylglucosamine (GlcNAc) enters the cell as part of the breakdown of the cell wall. GlcNAc, a monosaccharide and derivative of glucose, is part of a biopolymer in the bacterial cell wall. This biopolymer forms a layered structure called peptidoglycan (PG). GlcNAc is then converted into GlcNAc-6-P by the enzyme NagE. This substrate is then deacetylated into acetate and GlcN-6-P by NagA. NagA is important for the production of GlcN-6-P, which is then used in two main pathways: PG recycling pathway and the glycolysis pathway.

=== PG recycling pathway ===
In the PG Recycling pathway, once GlcNAc-6-P is metabolized by NagA, its product, GlcN-6-P, can then be converted to GlcN-1-P by the enzyme GlmM, followed by reacetylation and reaction with UTP by GlmU to form UDP-GlcNAc. UDP-GlcNAc is the end product of this pathway, which is then used to make glycosaminoglycans, proteoglycans, and glycolipids, which are all necessary in order to replenish PG for the cell wall. PG recycling is necessary for bacterial cells in order to ensure bacteria growth and prevent cell lysis.

=== Glycolysis pathway ===
Instead of entering the PG recycling pathway, GlcN-6-P can be converted into fructose-6-phosphate by NagB. This reaction is reversible by the enzyme GlmS, an amidotransferase. The produced fructose-6-phosphate then enters the glycolysis pathway. Glycolysis catalyzes the production of pyruvate, leading to the citric acid cycle and allowing for the production of amino acids. GlcN-6-P and fructose-6-phosphate act as allosteric regulators of NagA, inhibiting further deacetylation of GlcNAc-6-P.

== Disease relevance ==
NagA is a potential drug target of Mycobacterium tuberculosis (Mtb). Eliminating NagA produces high levels of the allosteric activator GlcNAc-6-P, which prevents the production of GlcN-6-P in order to proceed with the PG recycling pathway. NagA is, therefore, at a crucial metabolic chokepoint in Mtb, representing the key enzymatic step in the generation of essential amino-sugar precursors. These precursors are required for Mtb cell wall biosynthesis and influence the PG recycling pathway. Additionally, the presence of cysteine in MSNagA's active site may represent a unique exploitative target in Mtb therapeutics.

== Structural studies ==
As of early 2019, 11 structures have been solved for this class of enzymes, with PDB accession codes PDB: 1O12, PDB: 1UN7, PDB: 1YMY, PDB: 1YRR, PDB: 2P50, PDB: 2P53, 6FV3, 6FV4, 3EGJ, 3IV8, and 2VHL.

== Nomenclature ==
The systematic name of this enzyme class is N-acetyl-D-glucosamine-6-phosphate amidohydrolase. Other names in common use include acetylglucosamine phosphate deacetylase, acetylaminodeoxyglucosephosphate acetylhydrolase, and 2-acetamido-2-deoxy-D-glucose-6-phosphate amidohydrolase.
