= List of medical abbreviations: N =

Sortable table
Abbreviation	Meaning
Nφ	Neutrophil
Na	sodium (from Latin natrium)
NA	negative appendectomy
NAAT	Nucleic Acid Amplification Test
NABS	normoactive bowel sounds
NAC	n-acetyl cysteine
NaCl	sodium chloride (saline)
NAD	no abnormality detected no apparent distress no appreciable disease (and many variations of the above)
NAD^{+}	nicotinamide adenine dinucleotide
NAFLD	Non-alcoholic fatty liver disease
NAI	non-accidental injury (child abuse)
NAS	no added salt
NASH	Non-alcoholic steatohepatitis
NB	newborn (infant) note well (please pay attention) (from Latin nota bene)
NBN	newborn nursery
NBIA	neurodegeneration with brain iron accumulation
NBT	nitroblue tetrazolium
NBTE	nonbacterial thrombotic endocarditis
NC	nerve action potential nasal cannula
NCAT	Normocephalic, atraumatic; also written NC/AT
NCC	noncompaction cardiomyopathy
NCCN	National Comprehensive Cancer Network
NCEP	National Cholesterol Education Program
NCS	nerve conduction study
NCT	nerve conduction test, aka nerve conduction study
NCV	nerve conduction velocity (see nerve conduction study)
ND	(examination) not done
NDD	neurodevelopmental disorder
NDI	nephrogenic diabetes insipidus
NDSC	National Decision Support Company
NE	norepinephrine
Ne	neutrophil granulocytes
NEAD	Non-epileptic attack disorder
NEAP	Net Endogenous Acid Production
NEC	not elsewhere classified necrotizing enterocolitis
NED	No evidence of disease
Neg	negative
Neo	neoplasm
NES	not elsewhere specified
NFR	not for resuscitation
NG	nasogastric
NGT; NG tube	nasogastric tube
NGTD	negative to date / no growth to date
NGU	nongonococcal urethritis
NH	nursing home
NHL	non-Hodgkin lymphoma
NHW	non-healing wound
NICMP; NICM	non-ischemic cardiomyopathy
NICU	neonatal intensive care unit
NIDDM	non-insulin-dependent diabetes mellitus
NIF	Negative inspiratory force
NIH	National Institutes of Health
NIPPV	Nasal intermittent positive pressure ventilation
NK; NK cells	natural killer cells
NKA	no known allergies
NKDA	no known drug allergies
NL	normal
NLP	no light perception (highest degree of blindness)
NM	nuclear medicine
NMR	nuclear magnetic resonance
NNH	number needed to harm
NNT	number needed to treat
NO	nitric oxide
No.	number
NOF	neck of femur fracture (refers to hip fracture)
NOMI	nonocclusive mesenteric ischemia
Non rep.	do not repeat
NOS	nitric oxide synthase; not otherwise specified
NPA	nasal pharyngeal aspirate
NPH	normal pressure hydrocephalus
Npl	neoplasm
NP	Nurse Practitioner
NPC	nasopharyngeal carcinoma
NPDR	Non-proliferative diabetic retinopathy
NPO	nil per os (nothing by mouth)
NPPV	noninvasive positive pressure ventilation
NPT	neuropsychiatric testing
NPTAC	no previous tracing available for comparison
NPV	negative predictive value
NRB	non-rebreather mask
NRBC	nucleated red blood cells
NREM	non–rapid eye movement
NRT	nicotine replacement therapy
n.s.	not significant
NS	normal saline
NSA	no significant abnormality
NSAID	nonsteroidal antiinflammatory drug
NSBB	Non-selective beta blocker
NSCC	Non-squamous-cell carcinoma
NSCLC	non–small cell lung carcinoma
NSD	normal spontaneous delivery (see childbirth)
NSE	neurospecific enolase
NSIP	Non-specific interstitial pneumonia
NSR	normal sinus rhythm
NST	non-stress test (see cardiotocograph)
NSTEMI	non-ST-elevation myocardial infarction
NSU	nonspecific urethritis
NSVD	normal spontaneous vaginal delivery
NT	not tested nontender nuchal translucency
NTBS	needs to be seen
NTD	neural tube defect
NTG	nitroglycerin
n/t	numbness and tingling
NTP	Nortriptyline
NTS	nucleus tractus solitarii, or Solitary nucleus
NTT	nasotracheal tube (see intubation)
NTX	N-telopeptide
nu	in each nostril
N&V n/v	nausea and vomiting
NVD	normal vaginal delivery (see childbirth); nausea, vomiting, and diarrhea
NVDC	nausea, vomiting, diarrhea, and constipation
NVI	Neurovascularly Intact, Neurovascular Injury, Neurovascular Impairment
NVID	Neurovascularly intact distally
NWB	Non-weight-bearing
NYD	Not yet diagnosed
NYHA	New York Heart Association
