= Sulfinylamine =

Type of organosulfur compound

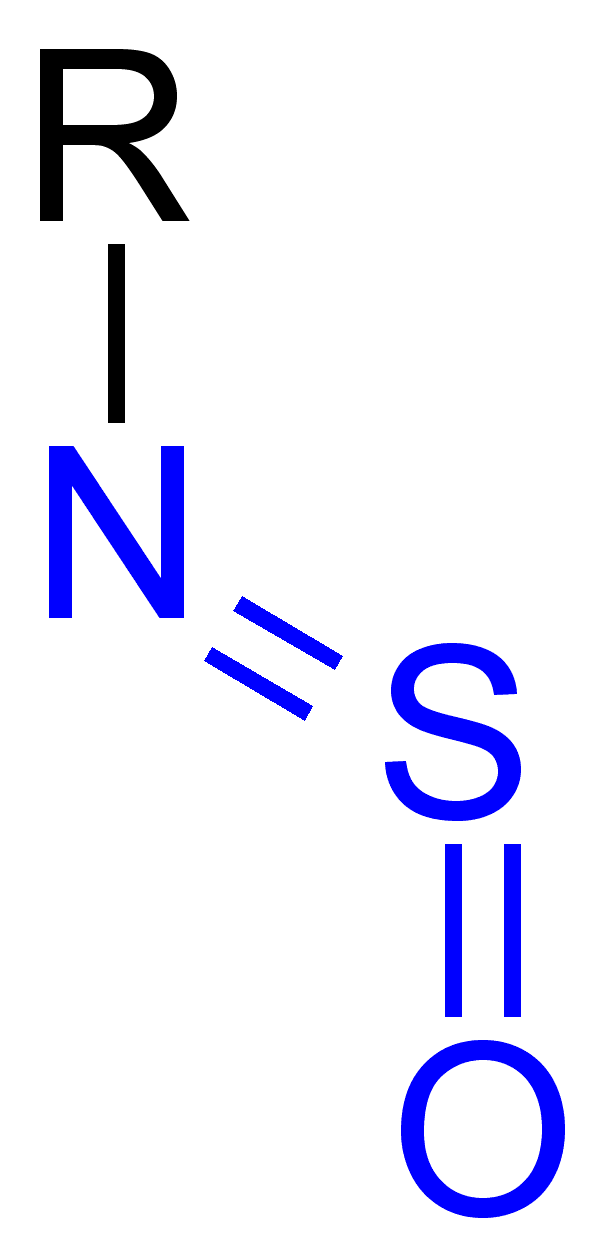
General structure of an N-sulfinyl amine

N-Sulfinylaniline is a common sulfinylamine

Sulfinylamines (formerly N-sulfinyl amines) are organosulfur compounds with the formula RNSO where R = an organic substituent. These compounds are, formally speaking, derivatives of HN=S=O, i.e. analogues of sulfur dioxide and of sulfur diimide. A common example is N-sulfinylaniline. The S-N bond in sulfinylamines is a dienophile. They undergo [2+2] cycloaddition to ketenes.

According to X-ray crystallography, sulfinylamines have planar C-N=S=O cores with syn geometry.

== Preparation ==
Sulfinylamines can be made when thionyl chloride SOCl_{2} reacts with a primary amine. Indeed, the parent, thionylimide (HNSO), can be made that way at low temperature or in the gas phase. Under standard conditions it polymerizes. The corresponding trimethylsilyl compound, Me_{3}SiNSO, is a stable liquid, albeit air-sensitive, and a common "^{−}NSO" synthon.

== Reactions ==
A frustrated Lewis pair, such as tris(tert-butyl) phosphine and tris(pentafluorophenyl)borane, can attach to the NSO chain to yield a R'_{3}P^{+}N(R)SOB^{−}R"_{3} compound.

== Compounds ==
| Formula | Name | CAS No | PubChem CID | Chemspider ID | MW (g/mol) | Reference |
|---|---|---|---|---|---|---|
| HNSO | Thionylimide; Sulfinylamine; Sulfoximine | 13817-04-4 | 139610 | 123125 | 63.074 | |
| C_{6}H_{5}NSO | N-Sulfinylaniline; N-Thionylaniline | 1122-83-4 | 70739 | 63904 | 139.172 | |
| | N-Sulfinyl-2,6-diethyl benzenamine | | | | | |
| | N-Sulfinyl-2-aminopyrimidine | 110526-12-0 | 14790782 | | 141.148 | |
| | N-Sulfinyl-n-butylamine | | | | | |
| | N-Sulfinyl-n-pentylamine | | | | | |
