= Darzens reaction =

Chemical ring forming reaction

Named after	Auguste Georges Darzens
Reaction type	Ring forming reaction

Identifiers
Organic Chemistry Portal	darzens-reaction
RSC ontology ID	RXNO:0000077

The Darzens reaction (also known as the Darzens condensation or glycidic ester condensation) is the chemical reaction of a ketone or aldehyde with an α-haloester in the presence of a base to form an α,β-epoxy ester, also called a "glycidic ester". This reaction was discovered by the organic chemist Auguste Georges Darzens in 1904.

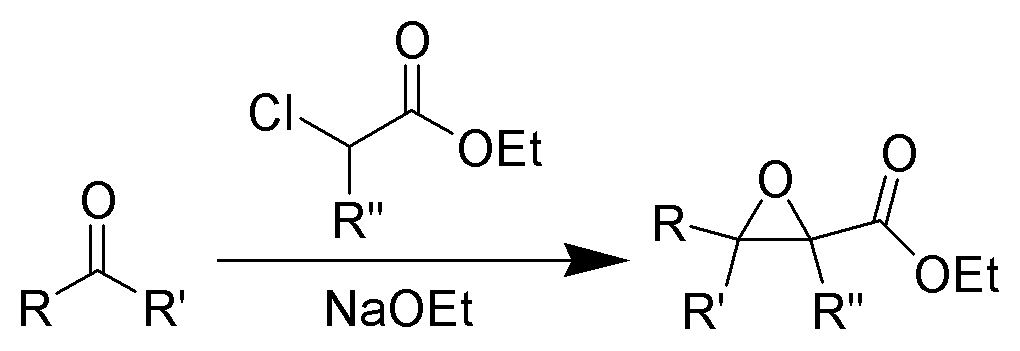

== Reaction mechanism ==
The reaction process begins with deprotonation at the halogenated position. Because of the ester substituents, this carbanion is a resonance-stabilized enolate. This nucleophile next attacks the carbonyl reagent, forming a carbon–carbon bond. These two steps are similar to a base-catalyzed aldol reaction. The oxygen anion in this aldol-like product then S_{N}2 attacks on the formerly-nucleophilic halide-bearing position, displacing the halide to form an epoxide. This reaction sequence is thus a condensation reaction since there is a net loss of HCl when the two reactant molecules join.

Arrow-pushing mechanism for the Darzens reaction.

If the starting halide is an α-halo amide, the product is an α,β-epoxy amide. If an α-halo ketone is used, the product is an α,β-epoxy ketone.

Any sufficiently strong base can be used for the initial deprotonation. However, if the starting material is an ester, the alkoxide corresponding to the ester side-chain is commonly chosen in order to prevent complications due to potential acyl exchange side reactions.

=== Stereochemistry ===
Depending on the specific structures involved, the epoxide may exist in cis and trans forms. A specific reaction may give only cis, only trans, or a mixture of the two. The specific stereochemical outcome of the reaction is affected by several aspects of the intermediate steps in the sequence.

The initial stereochemistry of the reaction sequence is established in the step where the carbanion attacks the carbonyl. Two sp^{3} (tetrahedral) carbons are created at this stage, which allows two different diastereomeric possibilities of the halohydrin intermediate. The most likely result is due to chemical kinetics: whichever product is easier and faster to form will be the major product of this reaction. The subsequent S_{N}2 reaction step proceeds with stereochemical inversion, so the cis or trans form of the epoxide is controlled by the kinetics of an intermediate step. Alternately, the halohydrin can epimerize due to the basic nature of the reaction conditions prior to the S_{N}2 reaction. In this case, the initially formed diastereomer can convert to a different one. This is an equilibrium process, so the cis or trans form of the epoxide is controlled by chemical thermodynamics—the product resulting from the more stable diastereomer, regardless of which one was the kinetic result.

=== Alternative reactions ===
Glycidic esters can also be obtained via nucleophilic epoxidation of an α,β-unsaturated ester, but that approach requires synthesis of the alkene substrate first whereas the Darzens condensation allows formation of the carbon–carbon connectivity and epoxide ring in a single reaction.

== Subsequent reactions ==
The product of the Darzens reaction can be reacted further to form various types of compounds. Hydrolysis of the ester can lead to decarboxylation, which triggers a rearrangement of the epoxide into a carbonyl (4). Alternately, other epoxide rearrangements can be induced to form other structures.

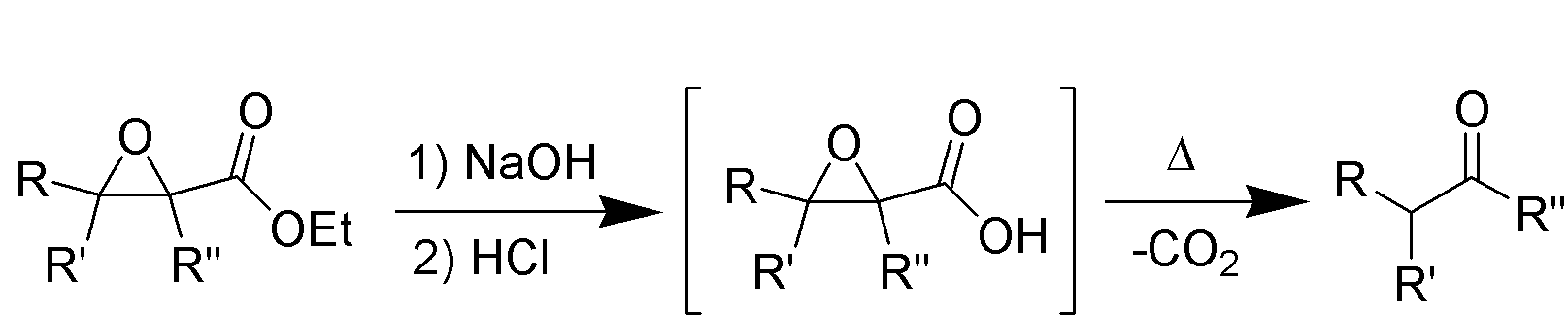
The Darzens reaction

== See also ==
- Johnson–Corey–Chaykovsky reaction
- Reformatskii reaction
