= Thionyl bromide =

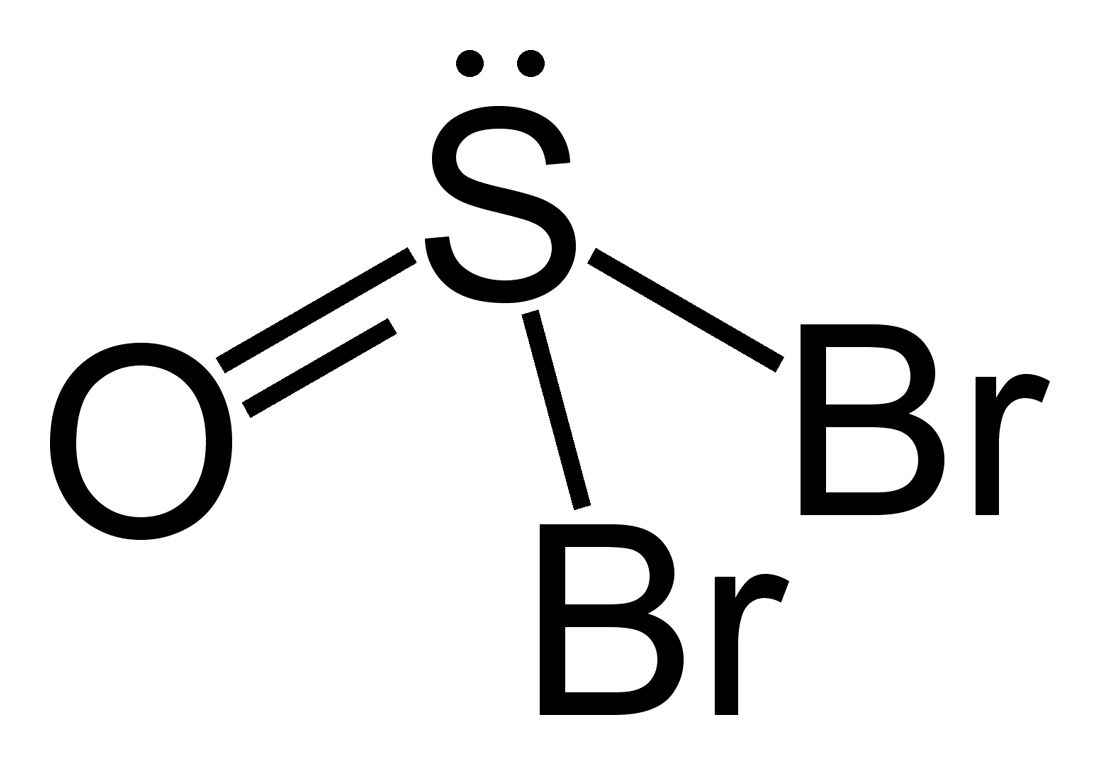
Structure of the thionyl bromide molecule
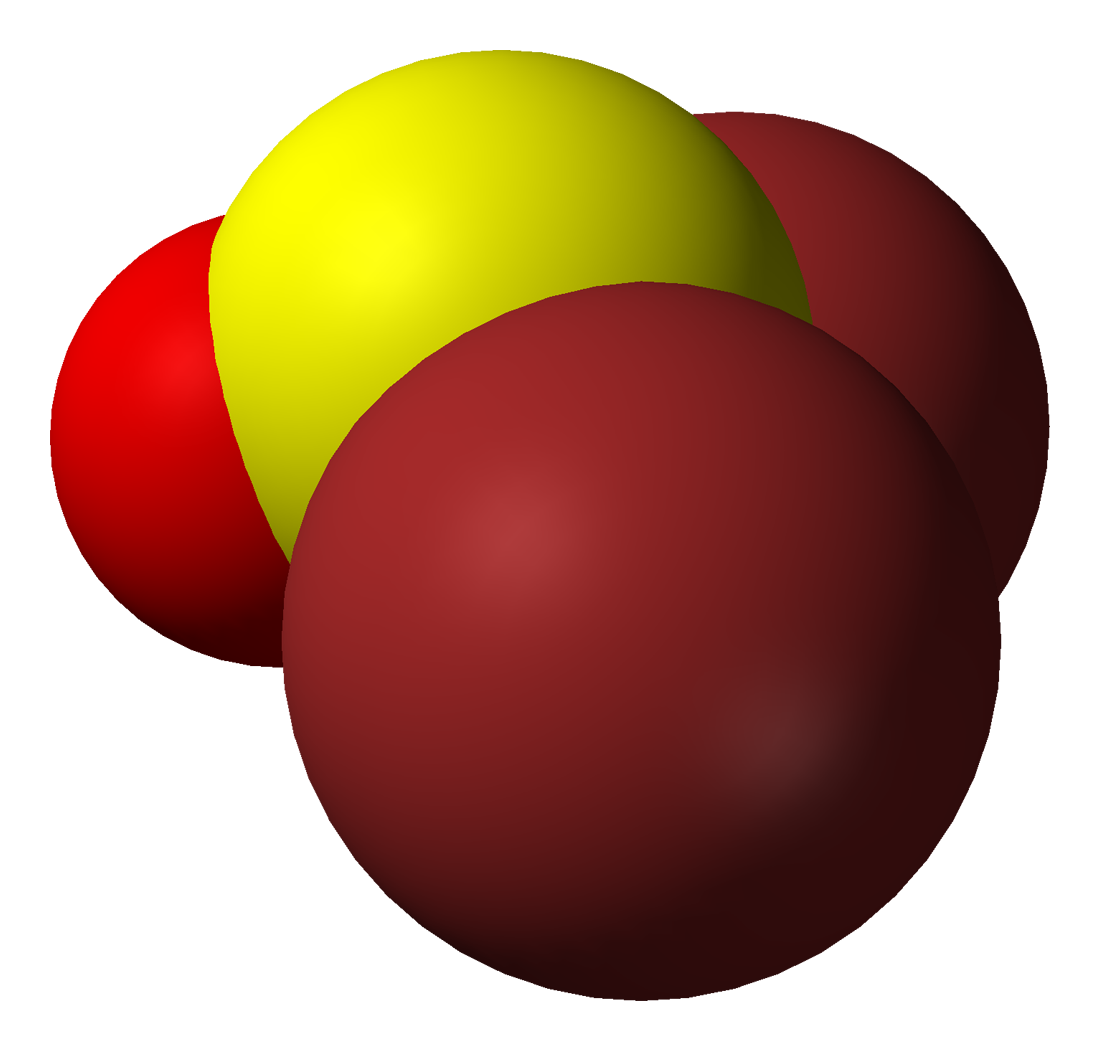
3D model of a thionyl bromide molecule
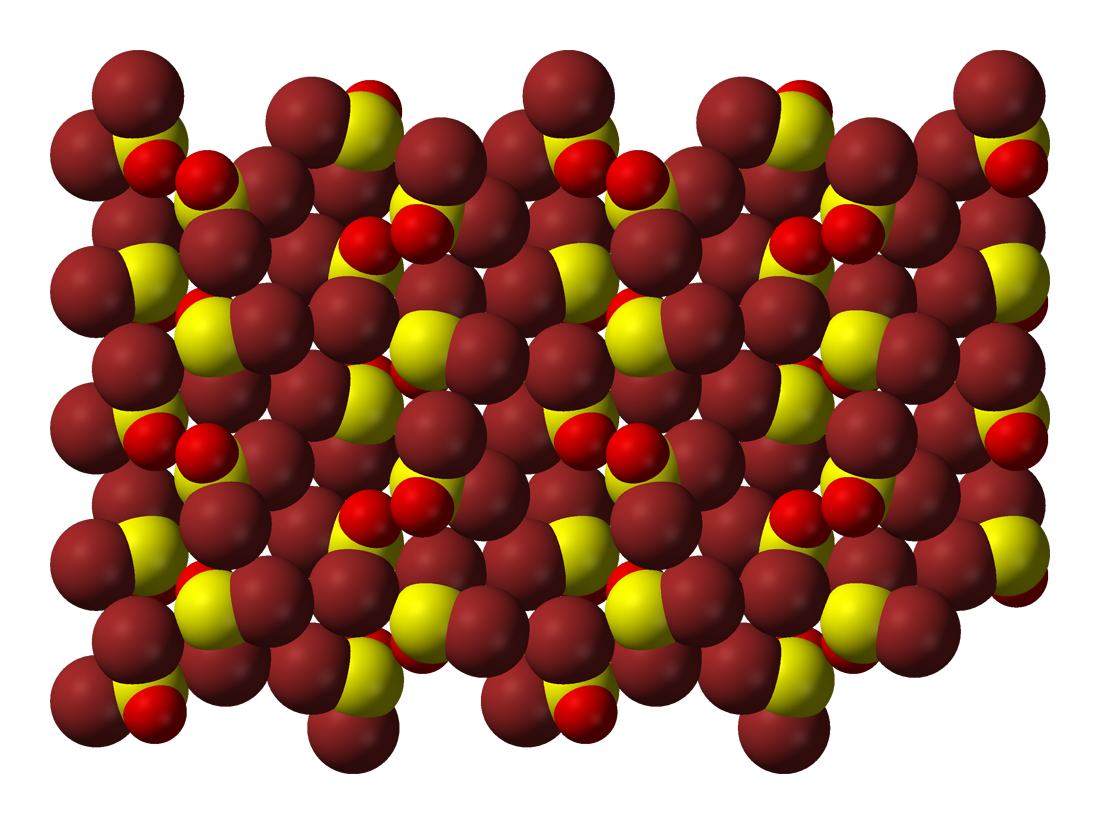
- Molecular arrangement in solid SOBr_{2} (note that this is dramatically different from the crystal structure of its chloride analogue)

Names
- IUPAC name Thionyl bromide
- Other names Sulfur oxy dibromide

Identifiers
CAS Number	507-16-4
3D model (JSmol)	Interactive image
ChemSpider	61483
ECHA InfoCard	100.007.332
EC Number	208-064-3
PubChem CID	68176
UNII	N6CU78B13T
CompTox Dashboard (EPA)	DTXSID0060143
- InChI: InChI=1S/Br2OS/c1-4(2)3 Key: HFRXJVQOXRXOPP-UHFFFAOYSA-N; InChI=1/Br2OS/c1-4(2)3 Key: HFRXJVQOXRXOPP-UHFFFAOYAY
- SMILES: BrS(Br)=O

Properties
Chemical formula	SOBr_{2}
Molar mass	207.87 g/mol
Appearance	colorless liquid
Density	2.688 g/mL, liquid
Melting point	−52 °C (−62 °F; 221 K) ; may include supercooling
Boiling point	48 °C at 20 mmHg; 136 °C at 1 atm but 1/3 decomposes
Solubility in water	decomposes
Solubility	reacts in HBr, acetone, and alcohol soluble in benzene, toluene, ether

Structure
Molecular shape	trigonal pyramidal
Dipole moment	1.47 D

Hazards
- Occupational safety and health (OHS/OSH)
Main hazards	Readily decomposes in air to toxic gases
- GHS labelling
Pictograms	(GHS05: Corrosive) (GHS07: Exclamation mark)
Signal word	Danger
Hazard statements	H312, H314, H332
Precautionary statements	P280, P305+P351+P338, P310
Flash point	Non-flammable
Safety data sheet (SDS)	"External MSDS"

Related compounds
Related compounds	SOCl_{2}, SeOCl_{2}; PBr_{3}, Br_{2}
- Except where otherwise noted, data are given for materials in their standard state (at 25 °C [77 °F], 100 kPa). verify (what is ?) Infobox references

Thionyl bromide is the chemical compound SOBr_{2}. It is less stable and less widely used than its chloride analogue, thionyl chloride, but engages in similar reactions.

== Chemistry ==
It is prepared by the action of hydrogen bromide on thionyl chloride, although the corresponding reaction at higher pH (i.e. alkali bromides) proceeds only with difficulty:

SOCl_{2} + 2 HBr → SOBr_{2} + 2 HCl

Phosphorus trichlorodibromide (but not phosphorus pentabromide) converts sulfur dioxide to thionyl bromide. Thionyl chlorobromide appears to be a key intermediate in these syntheses, but has not been isolated.

Thionyl bromide can also be prepared from thionylaniline and bromine. Thionylaniline is typically prepared from aniline and thionyl chloride, but can also be prepared from aniline without thionyl chloride.

Thionyl bromide will convert alcohols to alkyl bromides and carboxylic acids to acyl bromides. Unlike with thionyl chloride, stoichiometric bases are problematic activating agents, because free bromide anions decompose thionyl bromide to tribromide, sulfur dioxide, and sulfur.

It can be used for brominations of certain α,β-unsaturated carbonyl compounds.

It may occasionally be used as a solvent.

== Safety ==
SOBr_{2} hydrolyzes readily in air to release dangerous fumes of sulfur dioxide and hydrogen bromide.

SOBr_{2} + H_{2}O → SO_{2} + 2 HBr

Decomposition to bromine and sulfur monoxide does not occur except at elevated temperatures.
