= Barbituric acid =

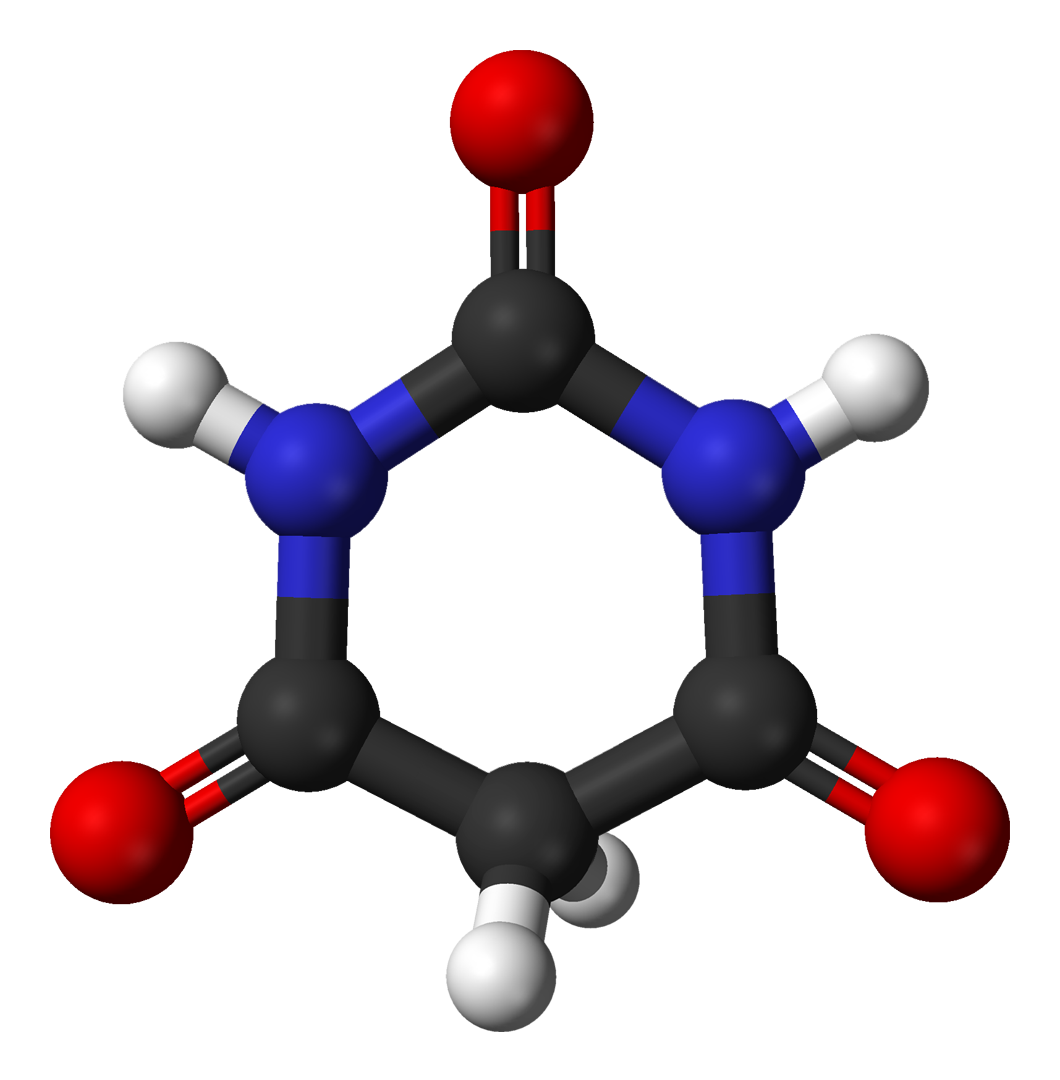

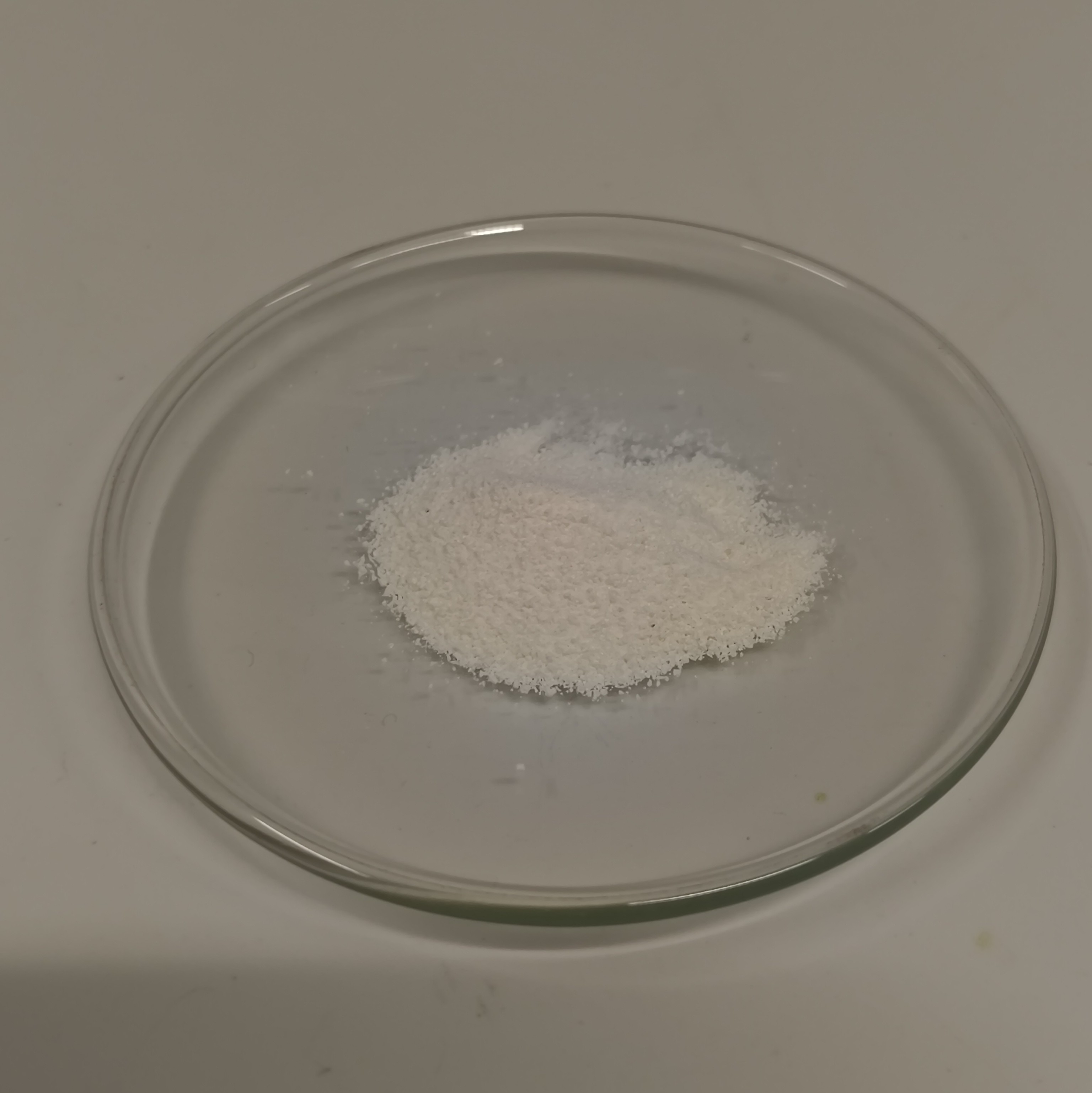
- Sample of barbituric acid

Names
- Preferred IUPAC name 1,3-Diazinane-2,4,6-trione
- Other names: 2,4,6(1H,3H,5H)-Pyrimidinetrione; Pyrimidine-2,4,6(1H,3H,5H)-trione; 2,4,6-Trioxohexahydropyrimidine; 2,4,6-Trihydroxypyrimidine; 2,4,6-Trioxypyrimidine; 2,4,6-Pyrimidinetriol; 2,4,6-Pyrimidinetrione; Pyrimidinetriol; 2,4,6-Trihydroxy-1,3-diazine; N,N-Malonylurea; Malonylurea; 6-Hydroxyuracil; 6-Hydroxy-hydrouracil; N,N-(1,3-Dioxo-1,3-propanediyl)urea

Identifiers
CAS Number	67-52-7
3D model (JSmol)	Interactive image
Beilstein Reference	120502
ChEBI	CHEBI:16294
ChEMBL	ChEMBL574699
ChemSpider	5976
ECHA InfoCard	100.000.598
EC Number	200-658-0
Gmelin Reference	101571
KEGG	C00813
PubChem CID	6211
UNII	WQ92Y2793G
CompTox Dashboard (EPA)	DTXSID8020129
- InChI: InChI=1S/C4H4N2O3/c7-2-1-3(8)6-4(9)5-2/h1H2,(H2,5,6,7,8,9) Key: HNYOPLTXPVRDBG-UHFFFAOYSA-N; InChI=1/C4H4N2O3/c7-2-1-3(8)6-4(9)5-2/h1H2,(H2,5,6,7,8,9) Key: HNYOPLTXPVRDBG-UHFFFAOYAE
- SMILES: O=C1NC(=O)NC(=O)C1

Properties
Chemical formula	C_{4}H_{4}N_{2}O_{3}
Molar mass	128.087 g·mol^{−1}
Appearance	White crystals
Melting point	245 °C (473 °F; 518 K)
Boiling point	260 °C (500 °F; 533 K)
Solubility in water	142 g/L (20 °C)
Acidity (pK_{a})	4.01 (H_{2}O)
Magnetic susceptibility (χ)	−78.6·10^{−6} cm^{3}/mol crystal+2H20; −53.8·10^{−6} cm^{3}/mol Anhy.

Hazards
- GHS labelling
Pictograms	(GHS07: Exclamation mark)
Signal word	Warning
Hazard statements	H315, H319, H335
Precautionary statements	P261, P264, P271, P280, P302+P352, P304+P340, P305+P351+P338, P312, P321, P332+P313, P337+P313, P362, P403+P233, P405, P501
NFPA 704 (fire diamond)	2 1 0
Safety data sheet (SDS)	External MSDS
- Except where otherwise noted, data are given for materials in their standard state (at 25 °C [77 °F], 100 kPa). verify (what is ?) Infobox references

Barbituric acid or malonylurea or 6-hydroxyuracil is an organic compound based on a pyrimidine heterocyclic skeleton. It is an odorless powder soluble in water. Barbituric acid is the parent compound of barbiturate drugs, although barbituric acid itself is not pharmacologically active. The compound was first synthesised by Adolf von Baeyer.

== Naming ==
It remains unclear why Baeyer chose to name the compound that he discovered "barbituric acid". In his textbook Organic Chemistry, the American organic chemist Louis Frederick Fieser (1899–1977) initially speculated that the name stemmed from the German word Schlüsselbart (literally, the beard (Bart, Latin: barba) of a key (Schlüssel), that is, the bit of a key), because Baeyer had regarded barbituric acid as central (or "key") to understanding uric acid and its derivatives. However, Fieser subsequently decided that Baeyer had named the compound after a young lady whom he had met and who was called "Barbara"' hence the name "barbituric acid" was a combination of the name "Barbara" and "uric acid". Other sources claim that Baeyer named the compound after Saint Barbara, either because he discovered it on the feast day of St. Barbara (December 4) or because he sometimes lunched with artillery officers and St. Barbara is their patron saint.

== Synthesis ==
Barbituric acid was first prepared and named in 1864 by the German chemist Adolf von Baeyer, by reducing what Baeyer called Alloxanbromid ("alloxan dibromide", 5,5-dibromobarbituric acid) with hydrocyanic acid, and later by reducing it with a combination of sodium amalgam and hydrogen iodide. In 1879, the French chemist Édouard Grimaux synthesized barbituric acid from malonic acid, urea, and phosphorus oxychloride (POCl_{3}).

The synthesis of barbituric acid from malonic acid and urea

Malonic acid has since been replaced by diethyl malonate, because using the ester avoids the problem of having to deal with the acidity of the carboxylic acid and its unreactive carboxylate.

== Properties ==
The α-carbon atom has a reactive hydrogen atom and is quite acidic (pK_{a} = 4.01) even for a 1,3-dicarbonyl species (cf. dimedone with pK_{a} 5.23 and Meldrum's acid with pK_{a} 4.97) because of the additional aromatic stabilization of the carbanion.

Aromatic stabilization of barbiturate carbanion

== Uses ==
Alkylation of barbituric acid can form a large variety of barbiturate drugs that behave as central nervous system depressants. As of 2007, more than 2550 barbiturates and related compounds have been synthesised by this and other routes, with 50 to 55 in clinical use around the world at present. The first to be used in medicine was barbital (Veronal) starting in 1903, and the second, phenobarbital was first marketed in 1912.

Barbituric acid is a chemical building block in the laboratory synthesis of riboflavin (vitamin B_{2}) and in a method of producing the pharmaceutical drug minoxidil. It is one of the four ingredients in the synthesis of riboflavin. Before barbituric acid was substituted in the synthesis of riboflavin, it was too expensive to synthesize riboflavin.

== Health and safety ==
Overdose of barbiturate drugs can cause respiratory depression and death. Barbiturates are dependence-producing, and abrupt cessation of high doses can result in a very medically serious, even lethal, withdrawal syndrome. Barbituric acid derivatives are considered DEA Schedule III controlled substances.

== See also ==
- Barbiturase
- Thiobarbituric acid
- Isocyanuric acid
