= Sulfur diimide =

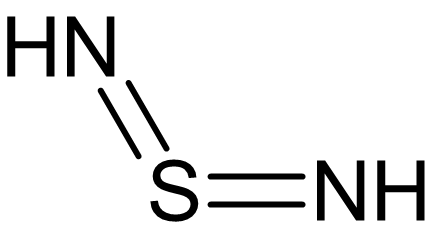

Names
- IUPAC name diimino-λ^{4}-sulfane
- Other names 2λ^{4}-Diazathia-1,2-diene

Identifiers
CAS Number	21918-40-1
3D model (JSmol)	Interactive image
ChemSpider	298618
PubChem CID	336934
- InChI: InChI=1S/H2N2S/c1-3-2/h1-2H Key: HQFYRKYAKZRZCJ-UHFFFAOYSA-N
- SMILES: N=S=N

Properties
Chemical formula	H_{2}N_{2}S
Molar mass	62.09 g·mol^{−1}
- Except where otherwise noted, data are given for materials in their standard state (at 25 °C [77 °F], 100 kPa). Infobox references

Sulfur diimides are chemical compounds of the formula S(NR)_{2}. Structurally, they are the diimine of sulfur dioxide. The parent member, S(NH)_{2}, is of only theoretical interest. Other derivatives where R is an organic group are stable and useful reagents.

== Organic derivatives ==
Structure of S(NBu-t)_{2}.

A particularly stable derivative is di-t-butyl‍sulfurdiimide. It is prepared by reaction of tert-butylamine with sulfur dichloride to give the intermediate "S(N-t-Bu)", which decomposes at 60 °C to give the diimide. Contrariwise, the trimethylsilyl derivative S(NSiMe_{3})_{2} is prepared from lithium hexamethyldisilazane and thionyl chloride.

However, most sulfur diimides are not produced from such elimination reactions. Typically, sulfur diimides arise from treatment of sulfur tetrafluoride with amines, or from transamidation reactions. The latter typically requires amide reactants that are less basic than the products, as with disulfonylsulfodiimide...

S(NSO_{2}Ph)_{2} + 2 RNH_{2} → S(NR)_{2} + 2 PhSO_{2}NH_{2}

...or with N,N'-Bis(methoxycarbonyl)sulfur diimide (MeO_{2}C-N=S=N-CO_{2}Me) from methyl carbamate. Alternatively, the presence of a strong base to absorb the released SO_{2} can drive transamidation from sulfinylamines.

== Structure, bonding, reactions ==
These compounds are related to SO_{2}. They have planar C–N=S=N–C cores with bent C–N=S and N=S=N geometries, and various combinations of E and Z isomers are observed for the two N=S bonds.

Sulfur diimides are electrophilic. The triimido analogues of sulfite can be generated by treating the sulfur diimides with a metal amide:

4 LiNHBu-t + 2 S(NBu-t)_{2} → 2 Li_{2}S(NBu-t)_{3} + 2 t-BuNH_{2}

Organolithium reagents attack at the sulfur to give the corresponding nitrogen anion:

R'Li + S(NR)_{2} → R'S(NR)(NRLi)

The addition is accompanied by "a colour change which makes the diimines useful as titrants for Grignard reagents".

Sulfur diimides undergo Diels–Alder reactions with dienes.

Fluorine gas oxidizes them to difluorosulfur diimides:

RNSNR′ + F_{2} → RNS(F)_{2}NR′

== See also ==
- Carbodiimide - the carbon analogue
- Disulfur dinitride
- Bis(trimethylsilyl)sulfur diimide
