= N-Sulfinylaniline =

Names
- Preferred IUPAC name (Phenylimino)-λ^{4}-sulfanone
- Other names N-thionylaniline, phenyliminooxosulfurane, N-sulfinylbenzenamine

Identifiers
CAS Number	222851-56-1; 1122-83-4 (non-specific)
3D model (JSmol)	Interactive image
ChemSpider	63904
ECHA InfoCard	100.013.058
EC Number	214-362-4
PubChem CID	70739
UNII	SV7R5HC44R
CompTox Dashboard (EPA)	DTXSID0061533
- InChI: InChI=1S/C6H5NOS/c8-9-7-6-4-2-1-3-5-6/h1-5H Key: FIOJWGRGPONADF-UHFFFAOYSA-N
- SMILES: C1=CC=C(C=C1)N=S=O

Properties
Chemical formula	C_{6}H_{5}NSO
Molar mass	139.17 g·mol^{−1}
Appearance	yellowish oil
Density	1.236 g/mL
Boiling point	88–95 °C (17–20 mmHg)

Hazards
- GHS labelling
Pictograms	(GHS07: Exclamation mark) (GHS08: Health hazard)
Signal word	Danger
Hazard statements	H315, H319, H334, H335
Precautionary statements	P261, P264, P271, P280, P285, P302+P352, P304+P340, P304+P341, P305+P351+P338, P312, P321, P332+P313, P337+P313, P342+P311, P362, P403+P233, P405, P501
- Except where otherwise noted, data are given for materials in their standard state (at 25 °C [77 °F], 100 kPa). Infobox references

N-Sulfinylaniline is the organosulfur compound with the formula C_{6}H_{5}NSO. It is a straw-colored liquid. N-Sulfinylaniline is an example of a sulfinylamine. It is a dienophile and a ligand in organometallic chemistry.

== Synthesis and structure ==
It is prepared by treating aniline with thionyl chloride:

3 PhNH_{2} + SOCl_{2} → PhNSO + 2 [PhNH_{3}]Cl

X-ray crystallographic analysis confirms that N-sulfinylaniline is structurally related to sulfur dioxide as well as sulfur diimide. The C–S=N=O dihedral angle is –1.60°.
