= Cyanuric acid amidohydrolase =

Class of enzymes

Identifiers
- EC no.: 3.5.2.15
- CAS no.: 100785-00-0

Databases
- BRENDA: enzyme data
- ExPASy: NiceZyme view
- KEGG: enzyme entry
- MetaCyc: metabolic pathway
- Rhea: reactions
- PDB structures: RCSB PDB PDBe PDBsum
- Gene Ontology: AmiGO / QuickGO
Search
- PMC: articles
- PubMed: articles
- NCBI: proteins

Cyanuric acid amidohydrolase (EC 3.5.2.15) is an enzyme characterised from bacteria including Pseudomonas species that catalyzes the chemical reaction:

cyanuric acid
H_{2}O
1-carboxybiuret

The reaction is part of the pathway for catabolism of s-triazine herbicides including atrazine. The initial product, 1-carboxybiuret, is unstable and can spontaneously decarboxylate to give biuret.

This enzyme is a hydrolase, one acting on carbon-nitrogen bonds other than peptide bonds, specifically in cyclic amides. The systematic name of this enzyme class is cyanuric acid amidohydrolase.
