= Uracil dehydrogenase =

Class of enzymes

Identifiers
- EC no.: 1.1.99.19
- CAS no.: 9029-00-9

Databases
- IntEnz: IntEnz view
- BRENDA: BRENDA entry
- ExPASy: NiceZyme view
- KEGG: KEGG entry
- MetaCyc: metabolic pathway
- PRIAM: profile
- PDB structures: RCSB PDB PDBe PDBsum
Search
- PMC: articles
- PubMed: articles
- NCBI: proteins

Uracil dehydrogenase (EC 1.1.99.19, uracil oxidase) is an enzyme with systematic name uracil:(acceptor) oxidoreductase. This enzyme catalyses the following chemical reaction

uracil + acceptor $\rightleftharpoons$ barbiturate + reduced acceptor

Also oxidizes thymine. The enzyme acts on the hydrated derivative of the substrate.
