= Enolase superfamily =

The enolase superfamily is a superfamily of enzymes, members of which catalyse a range of reactions.

The enolase superfamily includes enzymes that catalyse a wide variety of reactions and performing diverse roles in metabolism. However, the reactions catalysed share the common chemical step of abstraction of a proton from a carbon adjacent to a carboxylic acid and a requirement of a divalent metal ion. This diversity of functions is in contrast to many families of enzymes whose members catalyse similar chemical reactions on different substrates.

== Members ==
- Enolase
- Mandelate racemase (MR)
- Muconate lactonizing enzyme (MLE)

The primary sequences of MR and MLE, approximately 25% identical, are related but significantly different; whereas their three-dimensional structures are similar. The enzyme enolase has a more distant, but nevertheless clear, relationship to MLE and MR. The enolase superfamily has served as a model superfamily for understanding enzyme function and is one of the protein families under study by the Enzyme Function Initiative (EFI).
