= Thionyl chloride =

Inorganic compound (SOCl2)

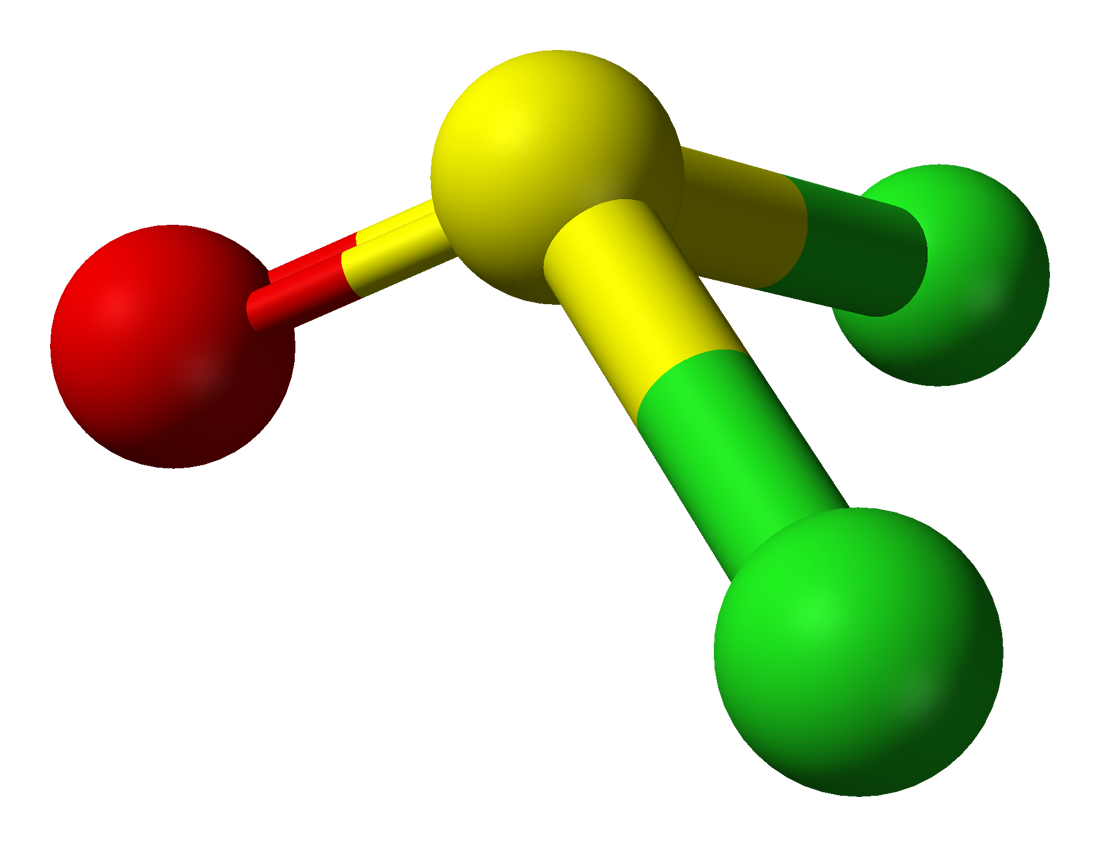
- Ball-and-stick model of thionyl chloride

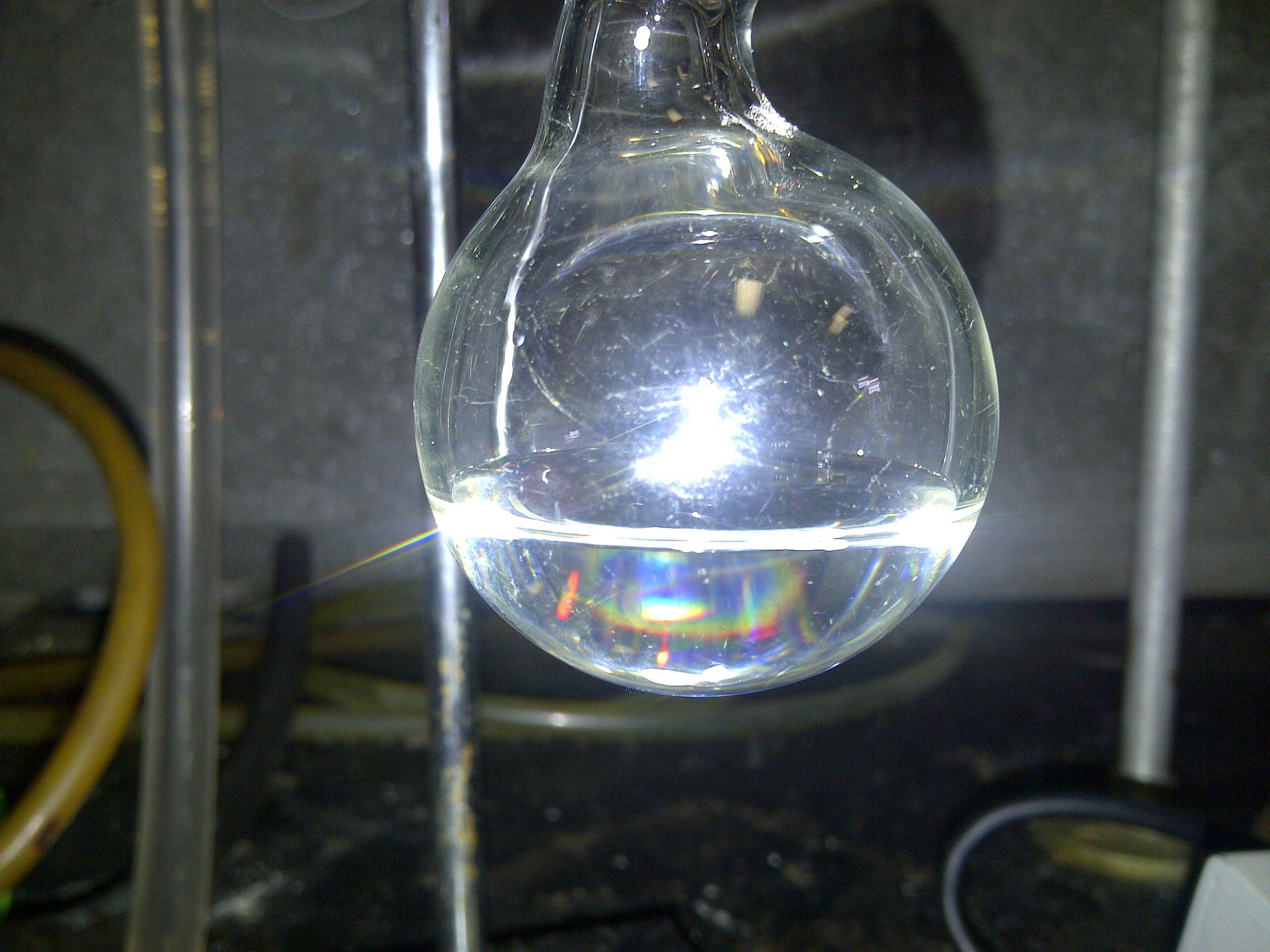

Names
- IUPAC name Thionyl chloride
- Other names: Thionyl dichloride; Sulfurous oxychloride; Sulfinyl chloride; Sulfinyl dichloride; Dichlorosulfoxide; Sulfur oxide dichloride; Sulfur monoxide dichloride; Sulfuryl(IV) chloride

Identifiers
CAS Number	7719-09-7
3D model (JSmol)	Interactive image
ChEBI	CHEBI:29290
ChemSpider	22797
ECHA InfoCard	100.028.863
EC Number	231-748-8
PubChem CID	24386
RTECS number	XM5150000
UNII	4A8YJA13N4
UN number	1836
CompTox Dashboard (EPA)	DTXSID3064778
- InChI: InChI=1S/Cl2OS/c1-4(2)3 Key: FYSNRJHAOHDILO-UHFFFAOYSA-N; InChI=1/Cl2OS/c1-4(2)3 Key: FYSNRJHAOHDILO-UHFFFAOYAN
- SMILES: ClS(Cl)=O

Properties
Chemical formula	SOCl_{2}
Molar mass	118.97 g/mol
Appearance	Colourless liquid (yellows on ageing)
Odor	Pungent and unpleasant
Density	1.638 g/cm^{3}, liquid
Melting point	−104.5 °C (−156.1 °F; 168.7 K)
Boiling point	74.6 °C (166.3 °F; 347.8 K)
Solubility in water	Reacts
Solubility	Soluble in most aprotic solvents: toluene, chloroform, diethyl ether. Reacts with protic solvents such as alcohols
Vapor pressure	384 Pa (−40 °C); 4.7 kPa (0 °C); 15.7 kPa (25 °C)
Refractive index (n_{D})	1.517 (20 °C)
Viscosity	0.6 cP

Structure
Point group	C_{s}
Molecular shape	pyramidal
Dipole moment	1.44 D

Thermochemistry
Heat capacity (C)	121.0 J/mol (liquid)
Std molar entropy (S^{⦵}_{298})	309.8 kJ/mol (gas)
Std enthalpy of formation (Δ_{f}H^{⦵}_{298})	−245.6 kJ/mol (liquid)

Hazards
- Occupational safety and health (OHS/OSH)
Main hazards	Very toxic, corrosive, releases HCl on contact with water
- GHS labelling
Pictograms	(GHS05: Corrosive) (GHS07: Exclamation mark) (GHS06: Toxic)
Signal word	Danger
Hazard statements	H302, H314, H331
Precautionary statements	P261, P280, P305+P351+P338, P310
NFPA 704 (fire diamond)	4 0 2 W
Flash point	Non-flammable
- NIOSH (US health exposure limits)
PEL (Permissible)	None
REL (Recommended)	C 1 ppm (5 mg/m^{3})
IDLH (Immediate danger)	N.D.

Related compounds
Related Thionyl halides	Thionyl fluoride; Thionyl bromide; Thionyl iodide
Related compounds	Sulfuryl chloride; Selenium oxydichloride
- Except where otherwise noted, data are given for materials in their standard state (at 25 °C [77 °F], 100 kPa). verify (what is ?) Infobox references

Thionyl chloride is an inorganic compound with the chemical formula SOCl_{2}. It is a moderately volatile, colourless liquid with an unpleasant acrid odour. Thionyl chloride is primarily used as a chlorinating reagent, with approximately 45,000 tonnes (50,000 short tons) per year being produced during the early 1990s, but is occasionally also used as a solvent. It is toxic, reacts with water, and is also listed under the Chemical Weapons Convention as it may be used for the production of chemical weapons.

Thionyl chloride is sometimes confused with sulfuryl chloride, SO_{2}Cl_{2}, but the properties of these compounds differ significantly. Sulfuryl chloride is a source of chlorine whereas thionyl chloride is a source of chloride ions.

== Production ==
The major industrial synthesis involves the reaction of sulfur trioxide and sulfur dichloride. This synthesis can be adapted to the laboratory by heating oleum to slowly distill the sulfur trioxide into a cooled flask of sulfur dichloride.

SO_{3} + SCl_{2} → SOCl_{2} + SO_{2}

Other methods include syntheses from:

- Phosphorus pentachloride:

SO_{2} + PCl_{5} → SOCl_{2} + POCl_{3}

- Chlorine and sulfur dichloride:

SO_{2} + Cl_{2} + SCl_{2} → 2 SOCl_{2}
SO_{3} + Cl_{2} + 2SCl_{2} → 3 SOCl_{2}

- Phosgene:

SO_{2} + COCl_{2} → SOCl_{2} + CO_{2}

The second of the above five reactions also affords phosphorus oxychloride (phosphoryl chloride), which resembles thionyl chloride in many of its reactions. They may be separated by distillation, since thionyl chloride boils at a much lower temperature than phosphoryl chloride.

Thionyl chloride can also be prepared from thionylaniline and hydrogen chloride. Thionylaniline is typical prepared from aniline and thionyl chloride, but can also be prepared from aniline and an alkyl sulphite. Alkyl sulphites are also typically prepared from alkyl alcohols and thionyl chloride, but can also be prepared from alkyl alcohols and disulphur dichloride.

== Properties and structure ==
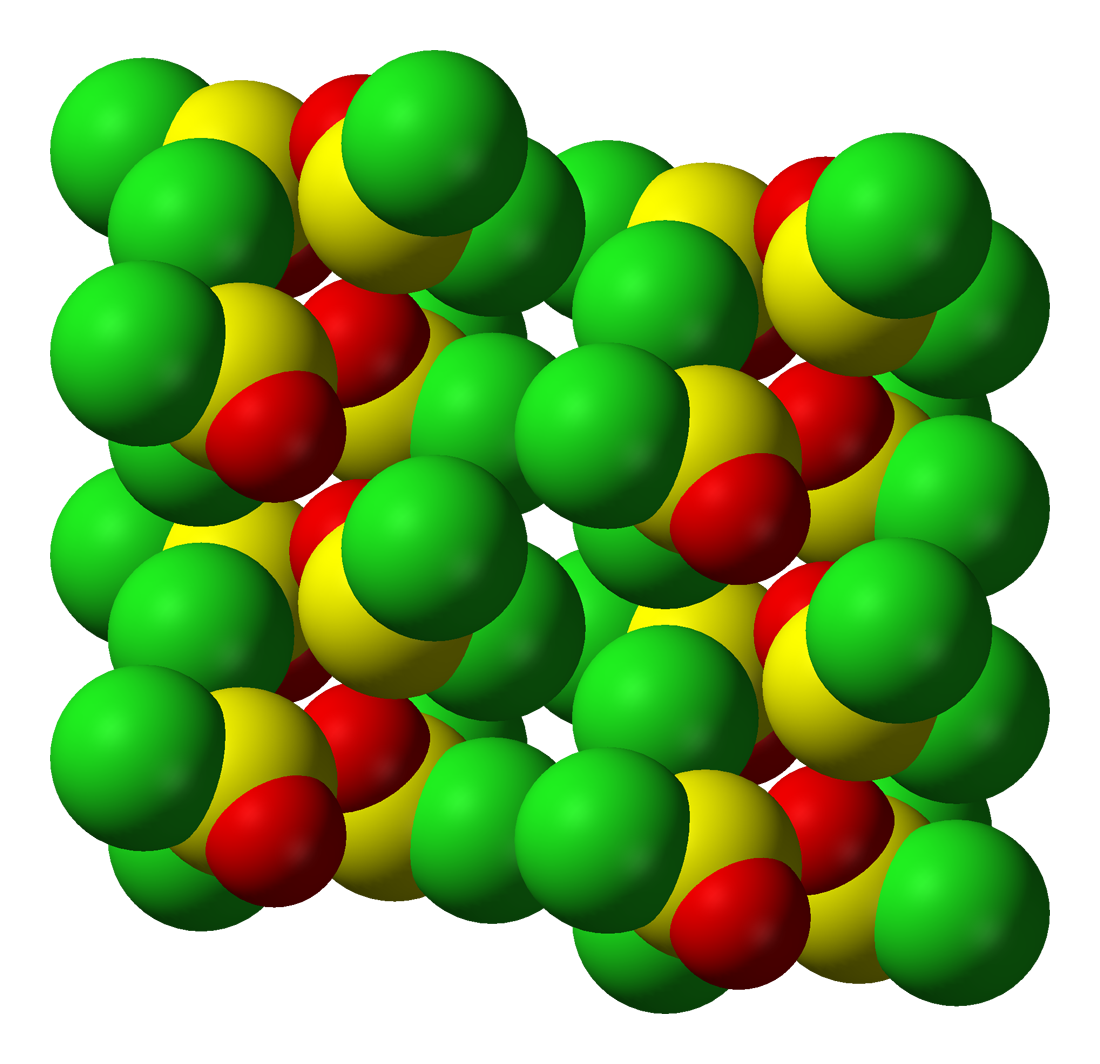
Crystal structure of solid SOCl_{2}

SOCl_{2} adopts a trigonal pyramidal molecular geometry with C_{s} molecular symmetry. This geometry is attributed to the effects of the lone pair on the central sulfur(IV) center.

In the solid state SOCl_{2} forms monoclinic crystals with the space group P2_{1}/c.

=== Stability ===
Thionyl chloride has a long shelf life, however "aged" samples develop a yellow hue, possibly due to the formation of disulfur dichloride. It slowly decomposes to S_{2}Cl_{2}, SO_{2} and Cl_{2} at just above the boiling point. Thionyl chloride is susceptible to photolysis, which primarily proceeds via a radical mechanism. Samples showing signs of ageing can be purified by distillation under reduced pressure, to give a colourless liquid.

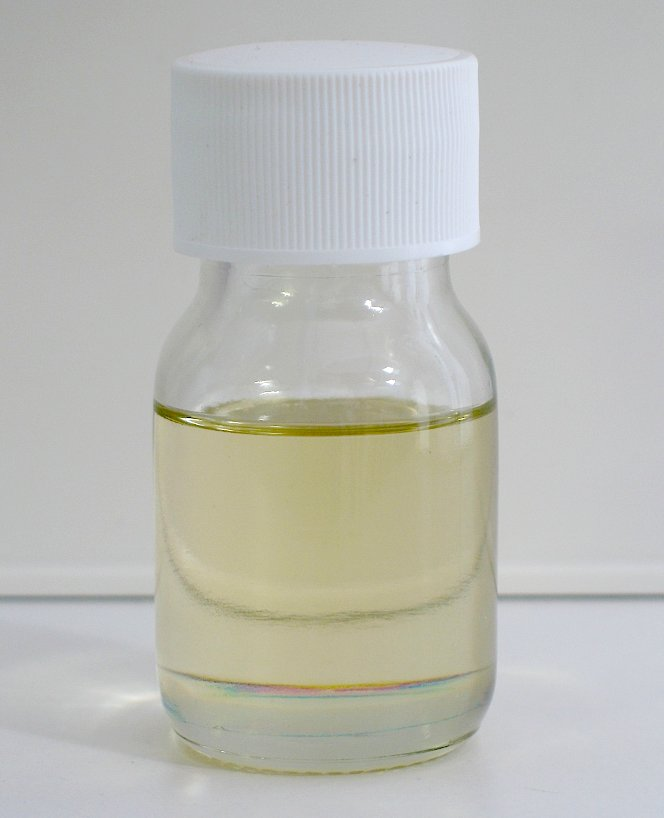
Impure thionyl chloride, appearing slightly yellow

== Reactions ==
Thionyl chloride is mainly used in the industrial production of organochlorine compounds, which are often intermediates in pharmaceuticals and agrochemicals. It usually is preferred over other reagents, such as phosphorus pentachloride, as its by-products (HCl and SO_{2}) are gaseous, which simplifies purification of the product.

Many of the products of thionyl chloride are themselves highly reactive and as such it is involved in a wide range of reactions.

=== With water and alcohols ===
Thionyl chloride reacts exothermically with water to form sulfur dioxide and hydrochloric acid:

SOCl_{2} + H_{2}O → 2 HCl + SO_{2}

By a similar process it also reacts with alcohols to form alkyl chlorides. If the alcohol is chiral the reaction generally proceeds via an S_{N}i mechanism with retention of stereochemistry; however, depending on the exact conditions employed, stereo-inversion can also be achieved. Historically the use of SOCl_{2} with pyridine was called the Darzens halogenation, but this name is rarely used by modern chemists.

Conversion of a secondary alcohol to a chloroalkane by thionyl chloride

Reactions with an excess of alcohol produce sulfite esters, which can be powerful methylation, alkylation and hydroxyalkylation reagents.

SOCl_{2} + 2 R−OH → (R−O)_{2}SO + 2 HCl

For example, the addition of SOCl_{2} to amino acids in methanol selectively yields the corresponding methyl esters.

=== With carboxylic acids ===
Classically, it converts carboxylic acids to acyl chlorides:

SOCl_{2} + R−COOH → R−COCl + SO_{2} + HCl

The reaction mechanism has been investigated:

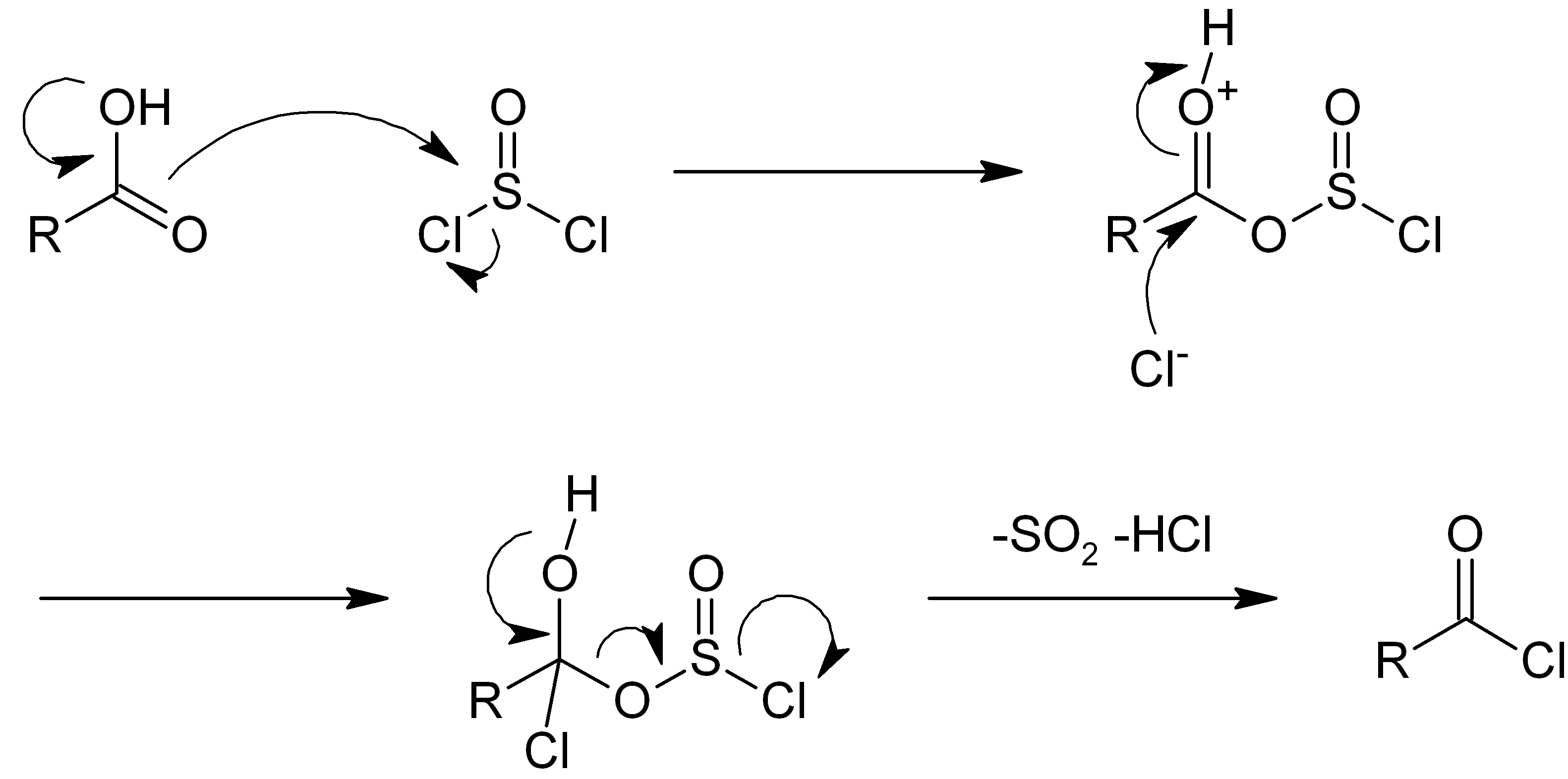

=== With nitrogen species ===
With primary amines, thionyl chloride gives sulfinylamine derivatives (RNSO), one example being N-sulfinylaniline. Thionyl chloride reacts with primary formamides to form isocyanides and with secondary formamides to give chloroiminium ions; as such a reaction with dimethylformamide will form the Vilsmeier reagent.

By an analogous process, secondary amides will react with thionyl chloride to form imidoyl chlorides, with tertiary amides giving chloroiminium ions. These species are highly reactive and can be used to catalyse the conversion of carboxylic acids to acyl chlorides; they are also exploited in the Bischler–Napieralski reaction as a means of forming isoquinolines.

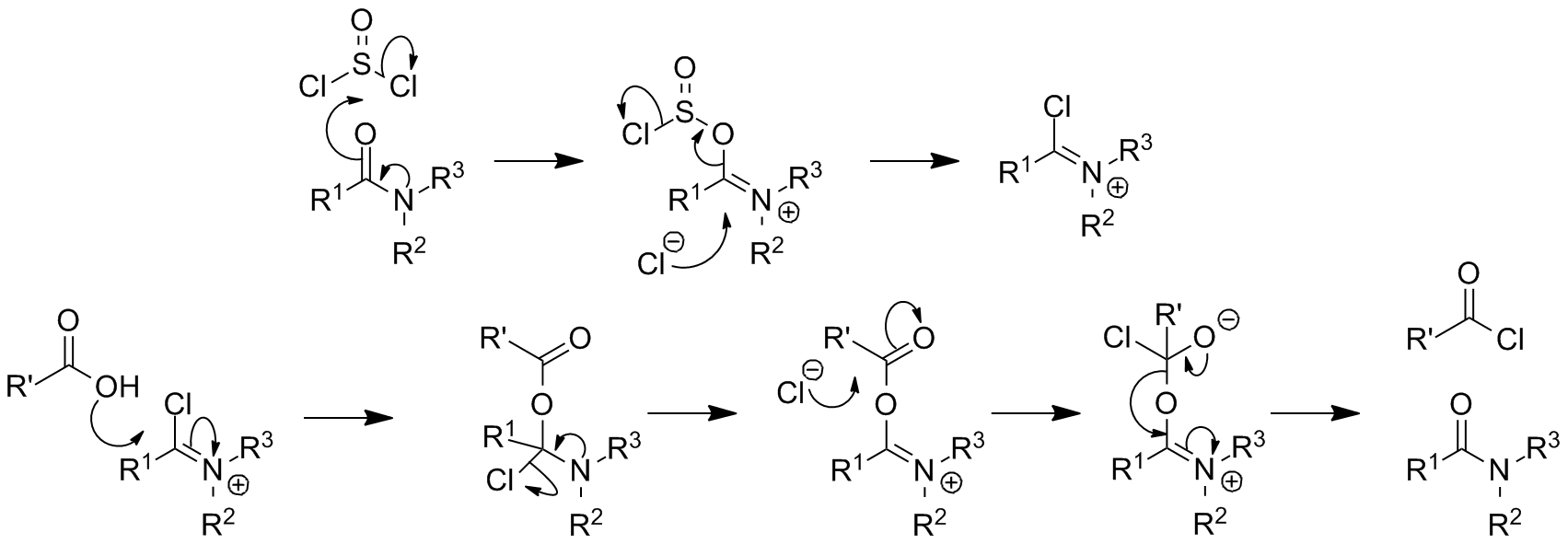

Primary amides will continue on to form nitriles if heated (Von Braun amide degradation).

Thionyl chloride has also been used to promote the Beckmann rearrangement of oximes.

=== With sulfur species ===
- Thionyl chloride will transform sulfinic acids into sulfinyl chlorides
- Sulfonic acids react with thionyl chloride to produce sulfonyl chlorides. Sulfonyl chlorides have also been prepared from the direct reaction of the corresponding diazonium salt with thionyl chloride.
- Thionyl chloride can be used in variations of the Pummerer rearrangement.

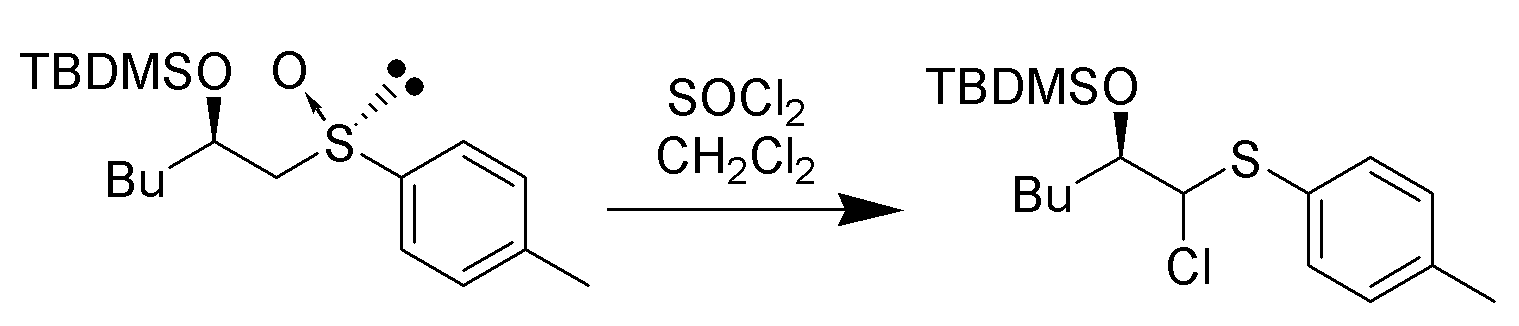

=== With phosphorus species ===
Thionyl chloride converts phosphonic acids and phosphonates into phosphoryl chlorides. It is for this type of reaction that thionyl chloride is listed as a Schedule 3 compound, as it can be used in the "di-di" method of producing G-series nerve agents. For example, thionyl chloride converts dimethyl methylphosphonate into methylphosphonic acid dichloride, which can be used in the production of sarin and soman.

=== With metals ===
As SOCl_{2} reacts with water it can be used to dehydrate various metal chloride hydrates, such magnesium chloride (MgCl_{2}·6H_{2}O), aluminium chloride (AlCl_{3}·6H_{2}O), and iron(III) chloride (FeCl_{3}·6H_{2}O). This conversion involves treatment with refluxing thionyl chloride and follows the following general equation:

MCl_{n}·xH_{2}O + x SOCl_{2} → MCl_{n} + x SO_{2} + 2x HCl

If an excess of SOCl_{2} is used to dehydrate aluminium trichloride, it will form an adduct (1 molecule of thionyl chloride for each molecule of the aluminium trichloride dimer).

=== Other reactions ===
- Thionyl chloride can engage in a range of different electrophilic addition reactions. It adds to alkenes in the presence of AlCl_{3} to form an aluminium complex which can be hydrolysed to form a sulfinic acid. Both aryl sulfinyl chlorides and diaryl sulfoxides can be prepared from arenes through reaction with thionyl chloride in triflic acid or the presence of catalysts such as BiCl_{3}, Bi(OTf)_{3}, LiClO_{4} or NaClO_{4}.
- In the laboratory, a reaction between thionyl chloride and an excess of anhydrous alcohol can be used to produce anhydrous alcoholic solutions of HCl.
- Thionyl chloride undergoes halogen exchange reactions to give other thionyl species.

Reactions with fluorinating agents such as antimony trifluoride give thionyl fluoride:

3 SOCl_{2} + 2 SbF_{3} → 3 SOF_{2} + 2 SbCl_{3}

A reaction with hydrogen bromide gives thionyl bromide:

SOCl_{2} + 2 HBr → SOBr_{2} + 2 HCl

Thionyl iodide can likewise be prepared by a reaction with potassium iodide, but is reported to be highly unstable.

== Batteries ==
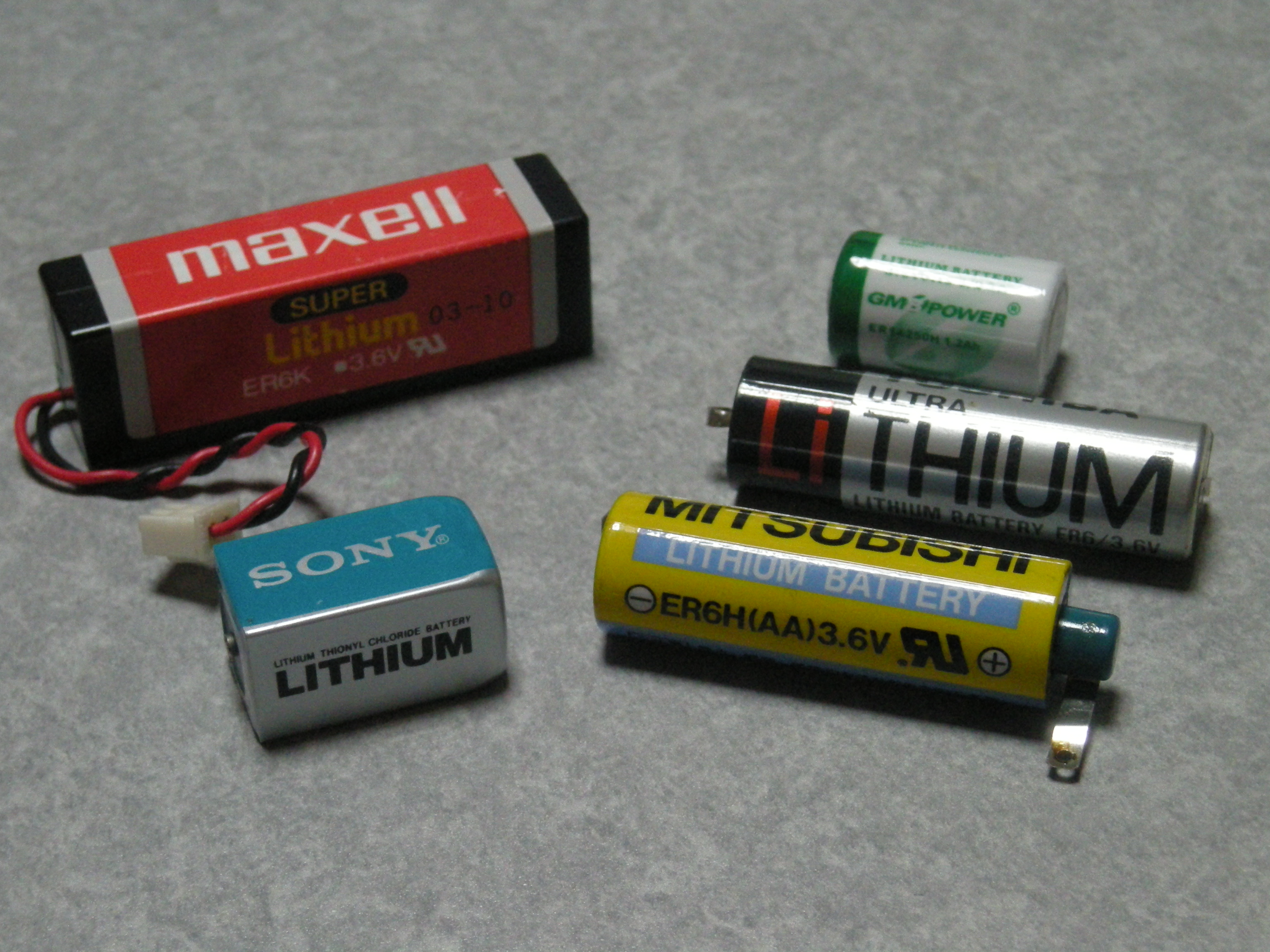
A selection of lithium–thionyl chloride batteries

Thionyl chloride is a component of lithium–thionyl chloride batteries, where it acts as both the electrolyte and the positive electrode (in batteries: cathode) with lithium forming the negative electrode (anode). The overall discharge reaction is as follows:

4 Li + 2 SOCl_{2} → 4 LiCl + 1/8 S_{8} + SO_{2}

These non-rechargeable batteries have advantages over other forms of lithium batteries such as a high energy density, a wide operational temperature range, and long storage and operational lifespans. They are popular power sources for IoT devices such as asset trackers and utility meters as well as military and aircraft emergency beacons. However, their high cost, non-rechargeability, and safety concerns have limited their use in consumer devices. The contents of the batteries are very corrosive, the SO_{2} is toxic by inhalation, and the batteries therefore require special disposal procedures; additionally, they may explode if shorted. The technology was used on the 1997 Sojourner Mars rover.

== Safety ==
SOCl_{2} is highly reactive, releasing hydrochloric acid and sulfur dioxide upon contact with water and alcohols. Inhalation can cause pulmonary edema. It is also a controlled substance under the Chemical Weapons Convention, where it is listed as a Schedule 3 substance, since it is used in the manufacture of G-series nerve agents and the Meyer and Meyer–Clarke methods of producing sulfur-based mustard gases.

== History ==
In 1849, the French chemists Jean-François Persoz and Bloch, and the German chemist Peter Kremers (1827–?), independently first synthesized thionyl chloride by reacting phosphorus pentachloride with sulfur dioxide. However, their products were impure: both Persoz and Kremers claimed that thionyl chloride contained phosphorus, and Kremers recorded its boiling point as 100 °C (instead of 74.6 °C). In 1857, the German-Italian chemist Hugo Schiff subjected crude thionyl chloride to repeated fractional distillations and obtained a liquid which boiled at 82 °C and which he called Thionylchlorid. In 1859, the German chemist Georg Ludwig Carius noted that thionyl chloride could be used to make acid anhydrides and acyl chlorides from carboxylic acids and to make alkyl chlorides from alcohols.

== See also ==
- Oxalyl chloride
- Phosphorus pentachloride
- Phosgene
- Sulfur dichloride
- Thionyl bromide
