= Muconate lactonizing enzyme =

Muconate cycloisomerase
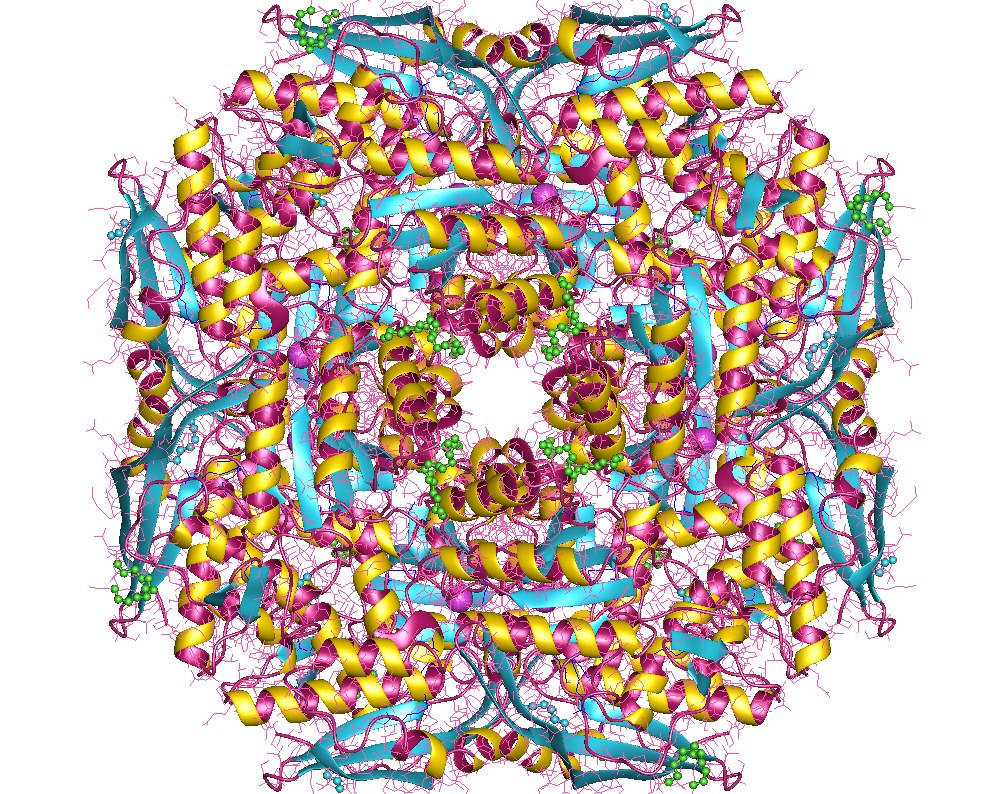
- Muconate cycloisomerase oktamer, Thermotoga maritima

Identifiers
- EC no.: 5.5.1.1
- CAS no.: 9023-72-7

Databases
- IntEnz: IntEnz view
- BRENDA: BRENDA entry
- ExPASy: NiceZyme view
- KEGG: KEGG entry
- MetaCyc: metabolic pathway
- PRIAM: profile
- PDB structures: RCSB PDB PDBe PDBsum
Search
- PMC: articles
- PubMed: articles
- NCBI: proteins

Muconate lactonizing enzymes (EC 5.5.1.1, muconate cycloisomerase I, cis,cis-muconate-lactonizing enzyme, cis,cis-muconate cycloisomerase, 4-carboxymethyl-4-hydroxyisocrotonolactone lyase (decyclizing), CatB, MCI, MLE, 2,5-dihydro-5-oxofuran-2-acetate lyase (decyclizing)) are involved in the breakdown of lignin-derived aromatics, catechol and protocatechuate, to citric acid cycle intermediates as a part of the β-ketoadipate pathway in soil microbes. Some bacterial species are also capable of dehalogenating chloroaromatic compounds by the action of chloromuconate lactonizing enzymes. MLEs consist of several strands which have variable reaction favorable parts therefore the configuration of the strands affect its ability to accept protons. The bacterial MLEs belong to the enolase superfamily, several structures from which are known. MLEs have an identifying structure made up of two proteins and two Magnesium ions as well as various classes depending on whether it is bacterial or eukaryotic. The reaction mechanism that MLEs undergo are the reverse of beta-elimination in which the enolate alpha-carbon is protonated. MLEs can undergo mutations caused by a deletion of catB structural genes which can cause some bacteria to lose its functions such as the ability to grow. Additional mutations to MLEs can cause its structure and function to alter and could cause the conformation to change therefore making it an inactive enzyme that is unable to bind its substrate. There is another enzyme called Mandelate Racemase that is very similar to MLEs in the structural way as well as them both being a part of the enolase superfamily. They both have the same end product even though they undergo different chemical reactions in order to reach the end product.

== Structure ==
The structure of the Muconate lactonizing enzymes (MLEs) consists of a seven-bladed beta propeller with various modifications based on the type of class that it belongs to. There are three classes of MLEs, them being the bacterial MLEs, bacterial CMLEs, and eukaryotic MLEs/CMLEs. The bacteria MLEs are made up of a TIM barrel and are arranged in the Syn stereochemistry, while the bacterial CMLEs are arranged in the Anti stereochemistry. When it comes to Eukaryotic MLEs/CMLEs, they are arranged in the Syn stereochemistry. Eukaryotic MLEs/CMLEs have not had a sequence similarity to any other families of enzymes, but the bacteria MLEs have been found to be similar to the Enolase superfamily, and the bacterial CMLEs are similar to the Class II fumarases.

The structure itself consists of two protein molecules consisting of a chain of amino acids and two chemicals being the two Magnesium ions.

== Function ==
On a large scale, MLEs catalyze the bacterial β-ketoadipate pathways by catabolizing aromatic lignin found in plants to intermediates found in the Krebs Cycle. Some MLEs can be halogenated with Cl and perform slightly different functions in the microbe. Halogenated MLEs can remove Cl from halogenated aromatics allowing for the decomposition of 2,4-dichlorophenoxyacetate. This unique function allows for these microbes to be used in bioremediation, decreasing the toxicity in herbicide infested soil. More specifically, MLEs have multiple strands. Some strands contain more reaction favorable portions according to Quantum Mechanics/Molecular Mechanics (QM/MM) analysis. The second strand of the MLE contains a basic residue that allows for proton acceptance on the Lys-162 or Lys-168 dependent upon which configuration it is in, anti or syn respectively. It is supported that the basic residues on the second strand are used in the formation of an energy surface versus the sixth strand. MLEs found in Mycobacterium smegmatis are anti-MLEs meaning they produce an anti-product of muconolactone (muconate lactone) while Pseudomonas fluorescens uses syn-MLEs to produce a syn-product.

== Mechanism and Action ==
Muconate lactonizing enzymes (MLEs) have the opposite type of reaction mechanism compared to Mandelate racemase (MR), it being the reverse of beta-elimination. Therefore, an alpha-carbon of the enolate gets protonated instead of deprotonated. But this protonation is a thermodynamically favorable step in the reaction. Also, just as in MR, in MLEs the formation of the enolate intermediate still is the central catalytic problem therefore being the rate limiting step. Moreover, MLEs can facilitate catalysis by attaching the substrate and therefore increasing the nucleophilicity of the carboxylate in order to produce lactone.

Muconate lactonizing enzyme actions to catalyze same 1,2 addition-elimination reaction. This can be done with or without a metal cofactor. In the soil microbes, Cis, cis- muconates (Substrate) is converted into muconolactones (product) by MLEs. This chemical reaction is part of β-ketoadipate pathway, an aerobic catabolic pathway, which breaks down aromatic compounds like lignin to an intermediate in citric acid cycle . β-ketoadipate pathway has two main branches :- 1) catechol branch and 2) protocatechuate branch. Catechol branch consists of cis, cis- muconate lactonizing enzyme, whereas a protocatechuate branch consists of carboxy -cis, cis-mucontate lactonizing enzyme. Both the reactions form Succinate + acetyl CoA, which leads into the citric acid cycle. On the other hand, Mandelate racemaseactions to catalyze the inversion of configuration at the alpha-carbon by creating a carbanionic intermediate.

== Mutation ==
The mutation in Mucanote lactonizing enzyme can be caused due to the deletion in catB structural gene and loss of pleiotropic activities of both the catB and catC gene. A microorganism named Pseudomona putida loses its ability to grow due to the deletion in catB gene for muconate lactonizing enzyme. Pseudomona putida (a cold sensitive mutant) normally grows at 30 degree C, but due to the result in the mutation of cis, cis-muconate lactonizing enzyme, it loses its ability to also grow at 15 degree C. At the low temperature, the mutant enzyme does not lose its function, rather the structural gene that codes for that particular enzyme loses its capability of expressing its gene at that temperature.

Additionally, mutation can also lead to the change in the structure and function of the enzyme. The different structure that is resulted by the mutation in the muconate lactonizing enzyme is Cl-muconate lactonizing enzyme. Cl-muconate lactonizing enzyme has two types of conformations :- open and closed. The mutation results in the switch of an amino acid to Ser99 and it hydrogen bonds to Gly48. The structure that results due this has a closed active site. Therefore, this change from muconate lactonizing enzyme to Cl-muconate lactonizing enzyme results in dynamic differences in the binding capability of the active site. Finally, a change in the binding capability will not let the reaction of dehalogenation to proceed any further. One important aspect to notice is that there cannot be a conformational change in Gly48 to Thr52. This is because the polypeptide will not be able to twist if Gly48 was replaced. Also, Thr52 and Glu50 are hydrogen bonded together.

Additional change in the conformation due to the mutation of the muconate lactonizing enzyme can result in a 21-30 loop. This can lead to a major difference in the active sites because it shows the difference in the polarity of an amino acid. In Cl-muconate lactonizing enzyme, Ile19 and Met21 are less polar compared to His22 (same position as Ile19) for muconate lactonizing enzyme. Hence, this results into the difference in the hydrophobic core structure at the active site.

Enzymes are very specific to their substrates and the formation of the product is dependent on the enzyme-substrate activity. The point mutation that resulted into the variants, Ser271Ala and Ile54Val, for Cl-muconating enzyme showed a significant decrease in the dehalogenation activity. One advantage of the mutation in muconate lactonizing enzyme from Asp to Asn or from Glu to Gln is that it can help to understand the effect of the metal ligand on the catalytic process and the binding site.

== Comparison between Muconate Lactonizing Enzymes and Mandelate Racemase ==
Mandelate Racemase has a strong relationship to Muconate Lactonizing Enzymes. Even though Muconate lactonizing enzyme and Mandelate Racemase catalyse different chemical reactions that is required by Pseudomonas putida for the catabolic processes, they are structurally very similar to one another. According to the Nature International Journal of Science, both the enzymes are "26% identical in their primary structure." Based on the Nature International Journal of Science, this characteristic of homologous structure is said to have been evolved from a common ancestor. This feature helps in modifying the enzymatic activities for the metabolic pathways.

According to the book, Enzymatic Mechanism, by Perry A. Frey and Dexter B. Northrop, Muconate lactonizing enzymes and Mandelate Racemase are both the member of enolase superfamily. Even though both the enzyme are different in their chemical reactions, they both have the same end product that leads to extracting a proton from an alpha carbon to a carboxylate ion. One of the advantage of the similarities between the structure of these two enzymes is to generate a high quality structural alignment that can help to improve their composition and strengthen the rate of reaction.

The following table helps to identify some of the similarities between both the enzymes :-

Table 1: Similarities
	Muconate Lactonizing Enzymes	Mandelate Racemase
Form Octamers	Yes	Yes
Monomer has 4 regions of secondary structures:- 1) A Beta- meander 2) An Alpha-helix bundle 3) An eight -stranded Alpha/Beta Barrel 4)a C-terminal mixed domain	Yes	Yes
Require a Divalent Metal Ion at: 1)High-affinity site 2)Low-affinity site	Yes	Yes
Residues	E250 (analogous to E222)	E222 (analogous to E250)
Type of Residues	Glutamine	Glutamine
Glutamine reside and its side chains	Bends away from the active site	Bends away from the active site
Common features in the active site	Requires a Catalytic base, K169 (homologous to K166) or K273 (homologous to D270), to extract a proton	Requires a Catalytic base, K166 (homologous to K169) and D270 (homologous to K273), to extract a proton
Catabolic bases positioned on one of the beta-strands that make up the barrel	Yes	Yes
Requires stabilization of transition state (the second carboxylate oxygen)	A short, strong hydrogen bond (a low barrier hydrogen bond) stabilizes the transition state with E327 ( analogous to E317)	A short, strong hydrogen bond (a low barrier hydrogen bond) stabilizes the transition state with E317 ( analogous to E327)

While the similarities are very prevalent, the difference between these two enzymes serve to understand the differences in the packaging of the enzyme in the crystal form. The following table helps to identify some of the differences between both the enzymes :-

Table 2: Differences
	Muconate Lactonizing Enzymes	Mandelate Racemase
RMS deviation	in the position of 171 matched alpha carbon is 2.0 Å	in the position of 325 matched α-carbons is 1.7 Å
Rotation of the Octamers	differ by only 2% (136 Å vs. 139 Å)	related by a factor of 3 (265 Å vs. 84 Å)
Crystal form in space group	I4	I422
Contacts between octamers in the crystals	very weak	very strong
Number of subunit in the crystal form	Two	Three
