= Amidohydrolase =

Class of enzymes

Amidohydrolases (or amidases) are a type of hydrolase that acts upon amide bonds.

They are categorized under EC number EC 3.5.1 and 3.5.2.

Examples include:

- Beta-lactamase
- Histone deacetylase
- Urease

The amidohydrolase superfamily is a large protein family of more than 20,000 members with diverse chemistry and physiologic roles. Due to its complexity and size, the amidohydrolase superfamily is being used by the Enzyme Function Initiative (EFI) for developing a large-scale strategy for functional assignment of unknown proteins.

== See also ==
- Amidohydrolases at the U.S. National Library of Medicine Medical Subject Headings (MeSH)
