= Édouard Grimaux =

French chemist and pharmacist (1835–1900)

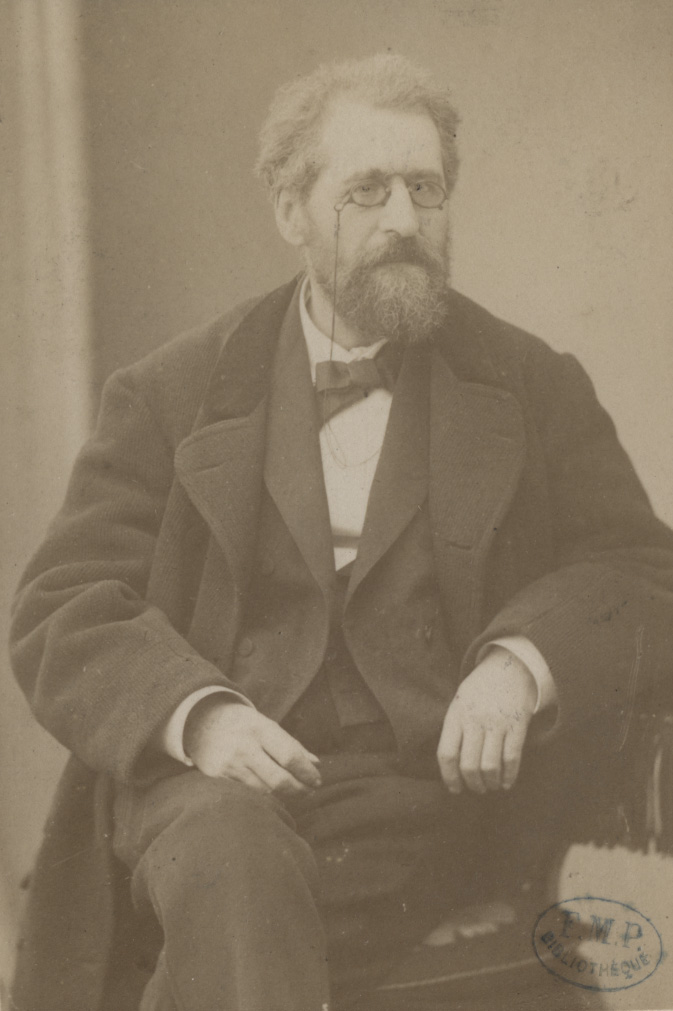
Édouard Grimaux

Louis Édouard Grimaux (3 July 1835 – 2 May 1900) was a French chemist, known for his research in the area of organic synthesis.

== Biography ==
From 1853 to 1858 he served as a pharmacist for the French navy at the ports of Rochefort and Toulon. In 1861 he moved to Paris, where he obtained his pharmacy degree (first class). In 1865 he earned his medical doctorate, and during the following year, received his agrégation for chemistry. In 1866 he began work in the laboratory of Charles-Adolphe Wurtz.

In 1873 he became sub-director in the laboratory of advanced studies at the Sorbonne, and three years later, was appointed professor of general chemistry at the Institute of Agronomy. In 1881 he was the successor of Auguste André Thomas Cahours at the École Polytechnique, but was forced to relinquish his professorship in 1898 due to his support regarding the innocence of Alfred Dreyfus.

His research included studies of nitrites, allantoin, aromatic glycols and on the synthesis of citric acid. Also, he conducted extensive research on the properties of numerous uric acid derivatives. In 1881 he succeeded in preparing codeine synthetically from morphine.

== Published works ==
He was the author of more than 120 scientific papers and books. He is credited with writing the first extensive biography of Antoine Lavoisier. He also published a biography of Charles Frédéric Gerhardt.

- Equivalents, atomes, molécules, 1866.
- Introduction à l'étude de la chimie, théories et notations chimiques, 1883.
- Lavoisier, 1888.
- Chimie organique élémentaire, 1889.
- Charles Gerhardt, sa vie, son oeuvre, sa correspondance, 1816-1856, 1900.
