= Tropaeolin =

Tropaeolin is the retained name for some azo dyes from the industrially applied group of acid dyes used as pH indicators. The name is derived from the botanical name Tropaeolum for nasturtiums.

== Examples for Tropaeolin dyes ==
Name	C.I.-Name	Structure	CAS number	Indicator properties	Other uses
Tropaeolin O (Resorcingelb)	Acid Orange 6 Food Yellow 8	C.I. Acid Orange 6	547-57-9	pH 11.1–12.7 yellow/brown	
Tropaeolin OO (Orange IV)	Acid Orange 5	C.I. Acid Orange 5	554-73-4	pH 1.2–3.2 violet-red/yellow	Dye for wool
Tropaeolin OOO1 (Orange I)	Acid Orange 20	C.I. Acid Orange 20	523-44-4	pH 7.6–8.9 yellow/pink	
Tropaeolin OOO2 (Orange II)	Acid Orange 7	C.I. Acid Orange 7	633-96-5	pH 7.4–8.6 amber/orange	Dye for wool and silk
Tropaeolin D (Methylorange)	Acid Orange 52	C.I. Acid Orange 52	547-58-0	pH 3.1–4.4 red	Textile dye (USA)
Tropaeolin G (Metanilgelb)	Acid Yellow 36	C.I. Acid Yellow 36	587-98-4	pH 1.2–2.3 yellow	
Tropaeolin RNP (Resorcinbraun)	Acid Orange 24	C.I. Acid Orange 24	1320-07-6	–	Coloring cosmetics
