= C6H7NO3S =

The molecular formula C_{6}H_{7}NO_{3}S (molar mass: 173.190 g/mol, exact mass: 173.0147 u) may refer to:

- Metanilic acid
- Orthanilic acid
- Piloty's acid
- Sulfanilic acid
