= Acid yellow =

Acid yellow may refer to:

- Naphthol yellow S (acid yellow 1)
- Yellow 2G (acid yellow 17)
- Metanil yellow (acid yellow 36)
- Martius yellow (acid yellow 24)
