= Colour Index International =

Reference database

- Type: Private
- Founded: 1924, United Kingdom
- Headquarters: United Kingdom
- Area served: Worldwide

Colour Index International (CI) is a reference database jointly maintained by SDC Enterprises and the American Association of Textile Chemists and Colorists. It currently contains over 27,000 individual products listed under 13,000 Colour Index Generic Names. It was first printed in 1924 but is now published solely on the Internet. The index serves as a common reference database of manufactured colour products and is used by manufacturers and consumers, such as artists and decorators.

== Overview ==
Colourants (both dyes and pigments) are listed using a dual classification which use the Colour Index Generic Name the prime identifier and Colour Index Constitution Numbers. These numbers are prefixed with C.I. for example, C.I. Acid Orange 7 or C.I. 15510. (This abbreviation is sometimes mistakenly thought to be CL, due to the font used to display it.) The generic name lists first the class of dye (acid dye, disperse dye, etc.), then its hue (e.g., orange), followed by a number assigned by the Colour Index, in chronological order (e.g., Acid Orange 5, Acid Orange 6, Acid Orange 7).

A detailed record of products available on the market is presented under each Colour Index reference. For each product name, Colour Index International lists the manufacturer, physical form, and principal uses, with comments supplied by the manufacturer to guide prospective customers.

For manufacturers and consumers, the availability of a standard classification system for pigments is helpful because it resolves conflicting historic, proprietary, and generic names that have been applied to colours.

== List of Colour Index Constitution Numbers ==
Colour Index arranges the CICN into 5 or 6 digit (from 1997 onwards) numbers grouped into numerical ranges according to the chemical structure.

Structure	Range	Category
Nitroso	10000–10299	
Nitro	10300–10999	
Monoazo	11000–19999	Category:Azo dyes
Disazo	20000–29999	Category:Azo dyes
Trisazo	30000–34999	Category:Azo dyes
Polyazo	35000–36999	Category:Azo dyes
Azoic	37000–39999	Category:Azo dyes
Stilbene	40000–40799	
Carotenoid	40800–40999	
Diarylmethane	41000–41999	Category:Diarylmethane dyes
Triarylmethane	42000–44999	Category:Triarylmethane dyes
Xanthene	45000–45999	
Acridine	46000–46999	Category:Acridine dyes
Quinoline	47000–47999	Category:Quinoline dyes
Methine	48000–48999	
Thiazole	49000–49399	Category:Thiazole dyes
Indamine	49400–49699	
Indophenol	49700–49999	Category:Indophenol dyes
Azine	50000–50999	Category:Azin dyes
Oxazine	51000–51999	Category:Oxazine dyes
Thiazine	52000–52999	Category:Thiazine dyes
Sulfur	53000–54999	
Lactone	55000–55999	
Aminoketone/Hydroxyketone	56000–56999	
Anthraquinone	58000–72999	Category:Anthraquinone dyes
Indigoid	73000–73899	
Quinacridone Pigments	73900-73999	
Phthalocyanine Dyes and Pigments	74000–74999	Category:Phthalocyanines
Natural Organic Colouring Matters	75000–75999	Category:Natural dyes
Oxidation bases	76000–76999	
Inorganic pigments	77000–77999	Category:Inorganic pigments

For further in-depth reading, see "Chemical constitutions in the Colour Index: A century of colourant classification" This is open source and free to read.

== Print editions ==
- 1st (1924)
- 1st Supplement (1928)
- 2nd (1956) Volume 1
- 2nd (1957) Volumes 2 & 3
- 2nd (1958) Volume 4
- 2nd Supplement (1963)
- 3rd (1971)
- 3rd 1975 (Volume 6)
- 3rd 1982 (Volume 7)
- 3rd 1987 (Volume 8)
- 3rd 1992 (Volume 9)
- Pigments and Solvent Dyes edition (1997)
- 4th 2000 - online

== See also ==
- Color chart
- List of dyes
- Pantone
