= 2-aminobenzenesulfonate 2,3-dioxygenase =

Class of enzymes

Identifiers
- EC no.: 1.14.12.14
- CAS no.: 156621-16-8

Databases
- IntEnz: IntEnz view
- BRENDA: BRENDA entry
- ExPASy: NiceZyme view
- KEGG: KEGG entry
- MetaCyc: metabolic pathway
- PRIAM: profile
- PDB structures: RCSB PDB PDBe PDBsum
- Gene Ontology: AmiGO / QuickGO
Search
- PMC: articles
- PubMed: articles
- NCBI: proteins

2-aminobenzenesulfonate 2,3-dioxygenase (EC 1.14.12.14) is an enzyme that catalyzes the chemical reaction

orthanilic acid
+ NADH
O_{2} + H^{+}
2,3-dihydroxybenzenesulfonic acid
+ NAD^{+} + NH_{3}

The four substrates of this enzyme are orthanilic acid, reduced nicotinamide adenine dinucleotide (NADH), oxygen and a proton. Its products are 2,3-dihydroxybenzenesulfonic acid, oxidised NAD^{+}, and ammonia.

This enzyme is an oxidoreductase that uses molecular oxygen as oxidant and incorporates both its atoms into the starting material. The systematic name of its class is 2-aminobenzenesulfonate,NADH:oxygen oxidoreductase (2,3-hydroxylating, ammonia-forming). It is also called 2-aminosulfobenzene 2,3-dioxygenase. It can degrade a variety of benzenesulfonic acids.
