= Griess test =

Test to detect nitrite ions in aqueous solution

The Griess test is an analytical chemistry test which detects the presence of nitrite ion in solution. One of its most important uses is the determination of nitrite in drinking water. The Griess diazotization reaction, on which the Griess reagent relies, was first described in 1858 by Peter Griess. The test has also been widely used for the detection of nitrates (N-oxidation state = +5), which are a common component of explosives, as they can be reduced to nitrites (N-oxidation state = +3) and detected with the Griess test.

== Method ==
Nitrite is detected and analyzed by the formation of a red pink colour upon treatment of a nitrite-containing sample with the Griess reagent, which consists of two components in an acidic solution: an aniline derivative and a coupling agent. The most common arrangements use sulfanilamide and N-(1-naphthyl)ethylenediamine: a typical commercial Griess reagent contains 0.2% N-(1-naphthyl)ethylenediamine dihydrochloride, and 2% sulfanilamide in 5% phosphoric acid. This diamine is used in place of the simpler and cheaper 1-naphthylamine because the latter is a potent carcinogen and moreover the diamine forms a more polar and hence a much more soluble dye in acidic aqueous medium. Other aniline derivatives that have been used include sulfanilic acid, nitroaniline, and p-aminoacetophenone.

The Griess test involves two subsequent reactions. When sulfanilamide is added, the nitrite ion reacts with it in the Griess diazotization reaction to form a diazonium salt, which then reacts with N-(1-naphthyl)ethylenediamine in an azo coupling reaction, forming a pink-red azo dye.

Using a spectrophotometer, it is possible to quantitatively determine the nitrite concentration. The detection limit of the Griess test generally ranges between 0.02 and 2 μM, depending on the exact details of the specific components used in the Griess reagent.

== Forensics ==
The test was used in forensics for many years to test for the traces of nitroglycerine. Caustic soda is used to break down sample containing nitroglycerine to produce nitrite ions.

The test involves the taking of a sample with ether and its division into two bowls. Caustic soda is added to the first bowl followed by the Griess reagent; if the solution turns pink within ten seconds, this indicates the presence of nitrites. The test itself is positive if, after adding only Griess reagent to the second bowl, the solution there remains clear.

The convictions of Judith Ward and the Birmingham Six were assisted by Frank Skuse's flawed interpretation of Griess test results.

== See also ==
- Nitrite test
- Nitrate test
