= M62 coach bombing =

1974 IRA attack in northern England

- Part of the Troubles
- Aftermath of the M62 coach bombing
- Location: 53°44′36″N 1°40′07″W; Between junctions 26 and 27 of the M62 motorway, West Riding of Yorkshire, England
- Date: 4 February 1974; 52 years ago c. 00:20
- Attack type: Time bomb
- Deaths: 12 (9 soldiers, 3 civilians)
- Injuries: 38 (soldiers and civilians)
- Perpetrator: Provisional IRA

On 4 February 1974, a 25-pound (11 kg) bomb planted by the Provisional Irish Republican Army (IRA) in a coach on the M62 motorway in northern England exploded, killing twelve people (nine soldiers and three civilians) and injuring thirty-eight others aboard the vehicle. The IRA hid the bomb inside a luggage locker of the coach, which was carrying off-duty British Armed Forces personnel and their family members.

Ten days after the bombing, 25-year-old Judith Ward was arrested in Liverpool while waiting to board a ferry to Ireland. She was later convicted of the M62 coach bombing and two other separate, non-fatal attacks and remained incarcerated until her conviction was quashed by the Court of Appeal in 1992, with the court hearing Government forensic scientists had deliberately withheld information from her defence counsel at her October 1974 trial which strongly indicated her innocence. As such, her conviction was declared unsafe.

Ward was released from prison in May 1992, having served over 17 years of a sentence of life imprisonment plus thirty years. Her wrongful conviction is seen as one of the worst miscarriages of justice in British legal history.

The M62 coach bomb has been described as "one of the IRA's worst mainland terror attacks" and remains one of the deadliest mainland acts of the Troubles.

== The bombing ==
The bombed coach had been specially commissioned to carry British Army and Royal Air Force personnel—on weekend leave with their families—to and from bases at Catterick and Darlington during a period of railway strike action sourcing from a labour dispute. The vehicle itself had departed from Manchester in the late evening of Sunday 3 February and was travelling at approximately 60 mph (100 km/h) along the M62 motorway en route to Catterick Garrison. Shortly after midnight, as most of those aboard were sleeping and when the bus was travelling between junctions 26 and 27 of the M62, the 25-pound (11 kg) bomb—concealed within a suitcase or similar parcel inside the coach's luggage compartment—exploded. (Note: The site where the bomb exploded is between Birstall and Birkenshaw.) (Note: Several sources state the bomb weighed 50 pounds (22 kg).)

The explosion reduced the rear of the coach to a "tangle of twisted metal", trapping several casualties within the debris and throwing individuals and severed limbs up to 250 yards (230 m) upon and around the motorway. No other vehicle was damaged in the explosion, although the vehicle travelling immediately behind the coach is known to have ploughed into the scattered debris of the rear of the coach. The coach itself travelled for more than 200 yards (180 m) before the driver, 39-year-old Roland Handley (himself injured by flying glass), was able to steer the coach to a halt upon the hard shoulder. (Note: Handley's actions in steering the bombed coach to safety were later commended. He died at the age of 76 in January 2012.)

=== Immediate efforts ===
One surviving soldier later described his recollections of having been blown through the emergency doors of the coach, only to find himself lying upon the ground viewing a "mangled wreck". This soldier later assisted a young girl aged approximately 17 with injured legs whom he found lying on her back approximately 200 yards (180 m) "back up the [motorway]". According to this individual, the girl had repeatedly hysterically screamed: "My God! The floor just opened up and I fell through!" as he provided medical assistance. Another survivor, nine-year-old David Dendeck, regained consciousness to find himself trapped in the wreckage of the coach listening to his 14-year-old sister, Catherine, shouting his name as he observed other survivors "screaming and running up the verge" alongside the coach.

One of the first motorists to offer assistance after Handley had navigated the coach to a halt was John Clark, who later recollected seeing a young man lying upon the motorway with one leg partially severed and the body of a child, stating: "It was just absolutely ... unbelievable. It was dark, so you couldn't see how bad the injuries really were, but it was the smell of it. It was absolutely total carnage."

The entrance hall of the nearby westbound section of the Hartshead Moor service station was used as an impromptu first aid station for those wounded in the blast. Off-duty staff at Bradford Royal Infirmary and Batley General Hospital were also contacted and encouraged to report for duty in response to the emergency.

== Fatalities ==
The explosion killed eleven people outright and wounded over thirty others, one of whom died four days later. Amongst the dead were nine soldiers – two from the Royal Artillery, three from the Royal Corps of Signals and four from the 2nd Battalion Royal Regiment of Fusiliers. Four of the servicemen killed in the bombing were teenagers and all but one of the serving personnel killed in the explosion hailed from Greater Manchester. (Note: The sole member of the British Armed Forces to die in the M62 coach bombing not to hail from Greater Manchester was 22-year-old Gunner Leonard James Godden, who hailed from Kent.) Twelve others upon the coach suffered severe injuries, including a six-year-old boy, who was badly burned.

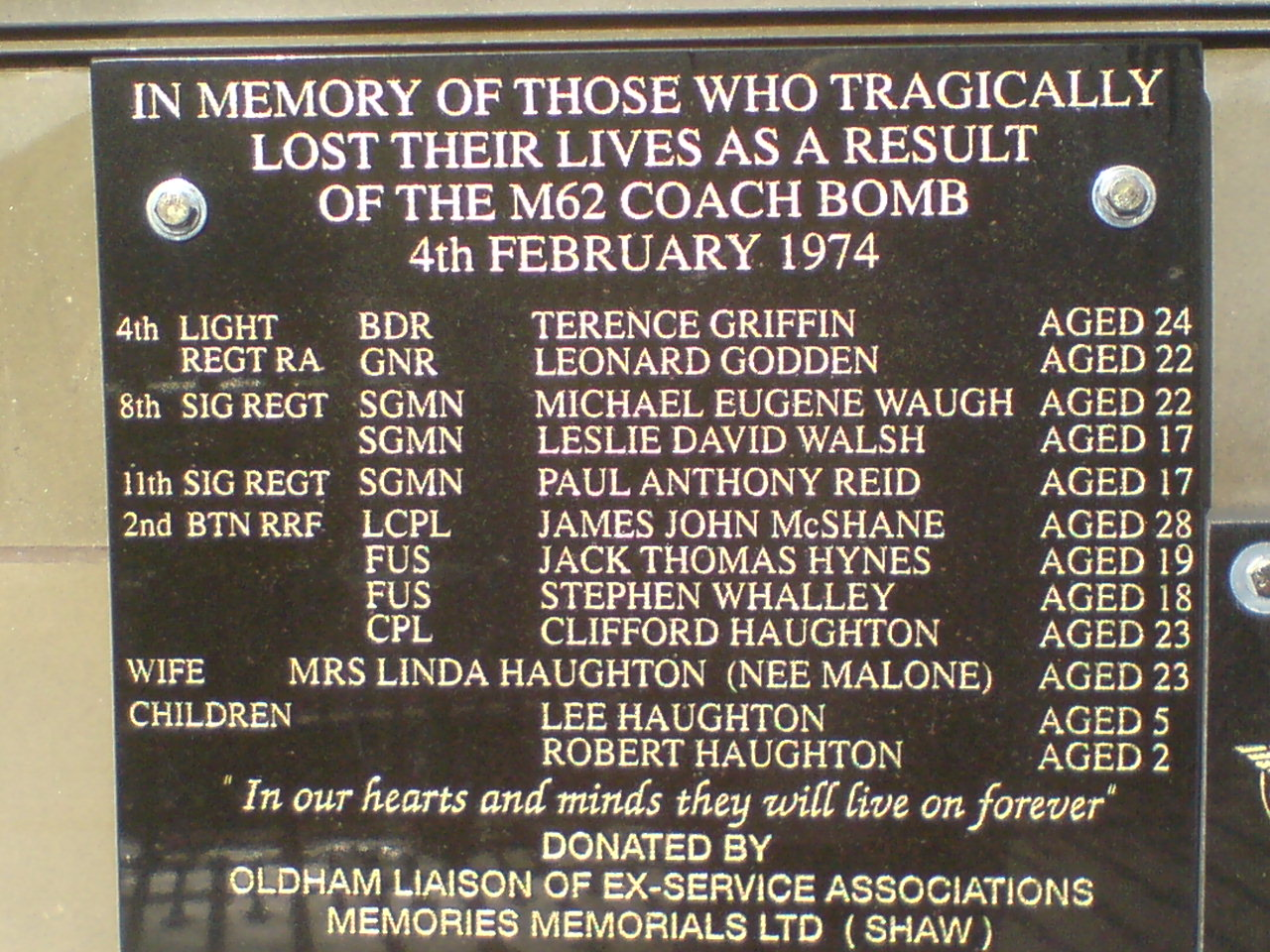
Plaque unveiled in Oldham in 2010 in memory of the victims of the M62 coach bombing

One member of the Royal Regiment of Fusiliers killed in the explosion was 23-year-old Corporal Clifford Haughton, whose entire family, consisting of his wife, Linda (also 23), and sons Lee, aged 5, and Robert, aged 2, were also killed. All four had been sitting directly above the bomb, and all were killed instantly. (Note: The Haughton family are buried in Blackley Cemetery, Manchester.)

=== Reaction ===
Although mainland Britain had seen several IRA attacks—successful or otherwise—within the previous year, the M62 coach bombing was the most severe attack upon the mainland to date. Press and public alike were incensed, with the BBC describing the bombing as "one of the IRA's worst mainland terror attacks" and national newspapers such as The Guardian describing the atrocity as an "IRA outrage on the British mainland". In Northern Ireland, the Ulster Defence Association launched a renewed wave of revenge attacks on Irish Catholics in response to the M62 coach bomb, promising their campaign of sectarian violence would continue unabated "until the IRA ceased [their] bombing in England". Within days of the bombings, loyalists had shot and killed three Catholic civilians and wounded a further eight, some critically.

Politicians from all three major parties called for "swift justice" against the perpetrator or perpetrators and the IRA in general. Within twenty-four hours of the explosion, demands had been heard in the Parliament of the United Kingdom that Irish citizens entering Britain be required to carry passports and other forms of identification at all times. The Secretary of State for Defence, Ian Gilmour, confirmed on 5 February these existing laws were to be reviewed.

=== IRA Army Council response ===
In an interview shortly after the bombing, IRA Army Council member Dáithí Ó Conaill was challenged over the choice of target, the lack of the official IRA protocol of a given advance warning, and the resulting deaths of civilians, including children. Ó Conaill replied that the coach was selected as a legitimate target because IRA intelligence had indicated that the vehicle was commissioned to carry military personnel only.

== Investigation ==
Although a police spokesman initially emphasised that investigators were keeping an "open mind" as to the cause of the explosion, in the days immediately following the bombing, suspicion quickly fell upon the IRA, which had extended its campaign to England the previous year and had recently begun efforts to force the British Government to transfer four IRA members serving life imprisonment in English jails and currently engaging in hunger strikes to prisons in Northern Ireland.

The construction of the explosive device was typical of those used by the IRA. An analysis of fragments of the timing device recovered at the scene of the explosion revealed the device may have been set to detonate up to one hour before the explosion. As the vehicle had stopped in Oldham, Manchester Chorlton Street coach station, and finally Huddersfield to collect returning service personnel and their families prior to travelling towards Catterick Garrison, a possibility existed the device could have been placed in the vehicle in any of these three locations, although the timing of the explosion indicated the device would unlikely have been placed upon the vehicle in Huddersfield.

Investigators initially remained open-minded as to whether the perpetrator was a member of a UK-based cell, or had travelled across from Northern Ireland to commit the atrocity, as had been the case with regard to a previous IRA bombing at the Old Bailey.

=== Arrest of Judith Ward ===
At 6:30 a.m. on 14 February, police encountered a 25-year-old mentally ill English woman named Judith Teresa Ward standing in a shop doorway in Liverpool city centre, seeking shelter from the cold and rain. As her driving licence had been issued in Northern Ireland and a letter from the Royal Ulster Constabulary was also found in her possession, Ward was detained for questioning.

Police quickly discovered the address on Ward's driving licence was false. She was then asked how she intended to travel to Ireland with very little money in her possession. In response, she claimed to have intended to telephone a friend in Ireland who would send her the money. The same evening, with Ward's consent, forensic scientist Frank Skuse obtained swab samples from her hands and fingernails to conduct Griess tests. These tests revealed what Skuse described as "faint traces" of nitrites upon one of her nails. A subsequent forensic examination by Skuse of a caravan in which Ward had recently lived prior to her arrest also revealed what he concluded to be traces of nitroglycerin upon a duffel bag and other personal possessions.

According to police, shortly thereafter, Ward—who is known to have suffered from a personality disorder—made a verbal statement claiming to have been a member of the IRA since 1971, but that "after [the M62 coach bombing] I just want out". The following day, she was transferred to the custody of West Yorkshire Police to be questioned further with regard to the M62 coach bombing.

=== Confessions ===
The ensuing police investigation was led by Detective Chief Superintendent George Oldfield. This investigation would prove to be rushed, careless and ultimately forged, but culminated in Ward claiming culpability for the M62 coach bombing and two separate, non-fatal explosions. Initially, Ward was questioned by two members of the Metropolitan Police Service at Wakefield's Police Training College. The conclusion of the Detective Inspector and Detective Constable following the first of their three interviews with Ward on 16 February was that she held "poor knowledge" of the construction of explosive devices and, although discrepancies were noted between the various oral statements Ward made and earlier statements she and others had provided to investigators, by 7:45 p.m., Ward had provided a written confession claiming culpability for the M62 coach bombing. She would initially be charged with conspiracy to cause an explosion on the M62 motorway on 18 February.

According to Ward's confessions, she was an "IRA volunteer" who had planted the M62 coach bomb in the luggage compartment of the coach while the vehicle was parked at Manchester Chorlton Street coach station. The luggage compartment had already been open when she, "shaking like a leaf", placed the bag containing the bomb between "a few army issue bags" in the luggage compartment. She had then turned and "legged it" out of the station, expecting the bomb to explode in twenty minutes.

By 25 February, West Yorkshire investigators had established that Ward's employment with a travelling circus had taken her to the market town of Chipping Norton in the Cotswold Hills on 3 February. Over a dozen independent witnesses were able to confirm this fact, thus meaning Ward could not have physically placed the bomb upon the coach as she had previously claimed. According to official records, on this date, Ward asked to see a Detective Superintendent Weight, exclaiming: "I want to see you about that statement I made to the other officers. I want to change it. I didn't put the bomb on that bus." The records further state Weight replied, "Yes, I know that." Ward then changed her statement to claim she had transported the bomb from Derby to a house in Longsight, Manchester and that, as the circus was to travel to Chipping Norton on the intended date of the bombing, she informed the two occupants of the house they would "have to do" the bombing. Ward then volunteered she "[knew] something about the Latimer job" she also wished to confess. The following day, in the presence of George Oldfield, Ward wrote a confession claiming culpability for transporting the explosives used in the September 1973 Euston bombing.

Ward also claimed to have conducted a string of operational activities for the IRA in both Belfast and mainland Britain in 1973 and 1974, to have been married to a deceased IRA member named Michael McVerry, (Note: McVerry was a 23-year-old member of the Provisional IRA who had been shot to death by the British Army on 15 November 1973.) and to have borne a child to another IRA member. However, although a supporter of Sinn Féin (Note: Early in her interrogation, Ward had admitted to investigators her belief in the cause Sinn Féin was fighting for, but of her belief that their objectives could be achieved politically. She would later admit to have briefly "flirted" with the general concept of Irish republicanism following her return to Dundalk in August 1972.) and likely knowing several individuals involved in IRA activity, (Note: According to Ward's later testimony, she had formed friendships with several IRA members—one of whom she claimed to have smuggled letters to while he had been incarcerated at Long Kesh as she used the alias Teresa O'Connell. Other than this activity and some possible—though unproven—weaponry transportation unconnected to the M62 coach bombing, she had not assisted with any IRA activities.) she had no firm connections with the IRA. The IRA would subsequently issue a statement confirming this fact.

The following month, Ward was shown a written copy of the statement she had provided on 16 February. She emphatically denied sections of the statement, insisting several claims she had supposedly made had been fabricated by investigators, although she did concede she had made some false claims regarding transporting what she believed to be explosives in a direct response to pressure from a Detective Superintendent Moffatt.

On 11 and 18 June—after Ward had been formally charged with various atrocities including the M62 coach bombing and without the knowledge of her solicitor—Oldfield again questioned Ward. The records of these interviews were removed from police files and transferred to the Metropolitan Police Service for security reasons. Early the following month, Ward attempted suicide by cutting her wrist shortly after being diagnosed with severe depression and on 24 August, a night orderly officer observed her attempting to injure her wrists by incessantly rubbing them against her bed straps.

== Suspect background ==
Ward had been born in Stockport, England, on 10 January 1949. She was the second of five children born to an English mother and an Irish father. (Note: Ward's father had been born in Stockport on 18 December 1925.) Contemporary records indicate she was a lonely child who was raised in a broken home. Upon leaving school in 1965, Ward trained as a riding instructor and stable hand in Wiltshire, England before obtaining employment at a riding school in Ravensdale, County Louth, Ireland, close to the town of Dundalk. In the years between leaving school and her arrest, she had frequently divided her time between Ravensdale, Wiltshire, and her home town of Stockport, which she had first returned to from Dundalk in October 1970.

In February 1971, Ward enlisted in the Women's Royal Army Corps (WRAC). Her basic training saw Ward spend approximately four months at Catterick Garrison before she was transferred to Aldershot, Hampshire on 5 August 1971 to serve as a communications centre operator. Two months later, Ward went absent without leave and returned to Dundalk, where she briefly became engaged to a young man named Sean McKeowan. Although McKeowan himself was disinterested in any form of politics, Ward is known to have frequently drunk in Dundalk pubs where, according to acquaintances, she frequently socialised with men affiliated with the Official IRA. She is also known to have briefly lived under the alias Teresa O'Connell, on one occasion listing her age when briefly detained by the Royal Ulster Constabulary as 14 years, eight months.

The following year, Ward returned to England, being discharged from the WRAC shortly thereafter. She briefly worked in a restaurant before returning to Dundalk to again work as a riding instructor in August 1972. She returned to England the following summer; initially residing with family in Stanbury Place, Offerton, Stockport.

On 26 August 1973, Ward was discovered sleeping rough on the concourse of Euston railway station and detained for questioning. (Note: A search of Ward's rucksack following this arrest uncovered several documents pertaining to IRA activities but no weaponry, explosives, or other possessions indicating IRA membership or activity.) Shortly thereafter, she obtained employment as a chambermaid at a hotel near the Elephant and Castle. This employment lasted until she was dismissed on 10 November. The same day, Ward travelled to Ireland via Holyhead.

=== January–February 1974 ===
In the weeks prior to her arrest, Ward had lived a somewhat nomadic and destitute lifestyle; alternately sleeping rough around Euston station and hitchhiking to locations such as Cardiff to temporarily sleep at the house of an acquaintance. Less than two weeks prior to her arrest, Ward obtained employment as a groom with Chipperfields Circus. She commenced her employment with the circus in Belle Vue, Manchester on 26 January. Shortly thereafter, the circus relocated to the Cotswolds, arriving at Chipping Norton at approximately 2:30 a.m. on 3 February. That evening, Ward and several colleagues visited the local Blue Boar pub on nearby Goddards Lane, remaining at this venue for several hours. (Note: Over a dozen independent witnesses were able to confirm that Ward had been drinking in the Blue Boar pub at the time of the planting of the M62 coach bomb.) The following day, Ward quit her employment.

Ward's appeals state that in the days prior to her arrest, she had most often slept rough around Euston station and Primrose Hill with a man named Ernest Mayall and a woman referred to in her appeal transcripts as a "Welsh girl", both of whom she later claimed to have first met in London on 8 February. Four days later, she and Mayall travelled by bus to Cardiff, with Ward leaving the duffel bags she had purchased in Chipping Norton inside a freight container. The following day, Ward hitchhiked from Cardiff to Liverpool, arriving in Liverpool at approximately 11:30 p.m. on 13 February. She was planning to travel to Newry, Northern Ireland when arrested early the following day.

== Trial ==
Ward's trial began before Mr Justice Waller at Wakefield Crown Court on 3 October 1974. She was charged with fifteen separate offences consisting of twelve charges of murder relating to the fatalities of the bombing, causing an explosion likely to endanger life and property with regard to this particular incident, and two separate, non-fatal IRA attacks at Euston railway station and the Latimer National Defence College committed in September 1973 and February 1974 respectively. Ward pleaded not guilty to all charges. Initial arraignment hearings were held on this date.

Although Ward's confessions had been coerced and distorted by some members of the investigating team prior to her trial, all the content within her confessions was presented by the prosecution as being "backed up by overwhelming scientific evidence".

Prosecutor John Cobb QC described Ward as an IRA agent, active in "major operations" on mainland Britain. The prosecution's case was almost completely based on her own claims of culpability (which Ward had retracted prior to her trial), weak circumstantial evidence and what would later be described as "demonstrably wrong" scientific evidence delivered by four witnesses who testified on behalf of the prosecution, which had sourced from the Griess tests conducted by Skuse and others.

To support the prosecution's contentions, several witnesses testified as to verbal statements Ward had made indicating her sympathies with the concept of Irish republicanism. A member of the Metropolitan Police Service was also called to testify as to statements Ward had made following her August 1973 arrest for vagrancy in London in which she had claimed to police to have "carried out assignments" for the IRA, but was not a member of the organisation. On 23 October, Ward repeated her disprovable claims to have been married to the deceased Michael McVerry. (Note: Prior to Ward's trial, McVerry's parents issued a statement via a solicitor confirming their son and Ward had never met nor married.)

Ward's defence attorney, Andrew Rankin, QC, refuted the prosecution contentions, insisting the forensic evidence presented could be easily explained as sourcing from cross-contamination and describing his client as a "female Walter Mitty" character, for whom fantasy had become reality, who was perhaps seeking notoriety in Irish folklore. Referencing the "rambling, incoherent and improbable" statements Ward had made to police, Rankin outlined the numerous inconsistencies and alterations she had made which indicated she had not been telling the truth and stressed to the jury the IRA would be extremely unlikely to accept or to trust an individual of sheer incompetence and who had, prior to 1974, come to the attention of the police and the Army in both Northern Ireland and England on several occasions.

The accuracy of the forensic testimony of the experts who testified that Ward's hands and possessions had tested positive for traces of nitroglycerin was seldom challenged by Ward's defence counsel, who contended she and her possessions may have become cross-contaminated via contact with an acquaintance who had been the original source of the traces of explosive materials. The prosecution witnesses refuted these claims.

=== Closing arguments ===
In the prosecution's closing argument, Cobb repeatedly referred to the physical evidence which he portrayed as conclusive proof Ward had handled explosives, emphasising the insistence of Skuse and others who had delivered forensic testimony on behalf of the prosecution that their findings were conclusive. Ward's confessions were also outlined as her willing admissions of guilt. Ward was described as a ruthless individual with a sole passion for her "political aim" to unite all of Ireland. Acknowledging that others should also be prosecuted for the three bombings, Cobb concluded his speech by stating to the jury: "You are sitting in judgment on the gravest charge, short of treason, ever known. There are, perhaps, bigger fish in the sea, but [Ward is] no sprat".

Rankin again disputed the sourcing of the traces of explosive material, insisting Ward had inadvertently become cross-contaminated and reiterating his client's ineptitude, vivid fantasy life, and the numerous inconsistencies within her repeatedly altered statements. Rankin then asked the jury to question why, had Ward been active within the IRA, did she not attempt to flee the country following the M62 coach bomb rather than travelling to London, making no attempt to conceal her identity.

=== Conviction ===
The jury deliberated for five hours and forty minutes before reaching their verdicts. On 4 November 1974, Ward was found guilty of all charges. She was sentenced to serve five years' imprisonment in relation to the Euston railway station bombing, twenty years' imprisonment in relation to the coach bombing, to be served concurrently with the sentence relating to the Euston bombing, twelve concurrent terms of life imprisonment with no recommended minimum term of imprisonment in relation to each of the fatalities of the coach bombing, plus ten years' consecutive imprisonment in relation to the Latimer bombing, thus meaning she would have to serve a minimum sentence of thirty years' imprisonment before being eligible for parole.

Ward remained impassive as the verdict was read aloud, although members of her family—who remained steadfast in their belief of her innocence—burst into tears. She did not appeal her conviction, although she repeatedly protested her innocence throughout her years of incarceration. Although the validity of her conviction was independently reviewed on three occasions between 1985 and 1989, and each review uncovered serious flaws with regard to the evidence presented at her trial and the legal conduct of various individuals prior to and following her confessions, she remained incarcerated at HM Prison Durham before being transferred to HM Prison Holloway in November 1990, where she remained as a Category B prisoner.

=== IRA statement ===
Shortly after Ward's November 1974 convictions, the Irish Republican Publicity Bureau issued a formal statement pertaining to her arrest and conviction. This statement again emphasised that Ward had not been a member of the IRA and that she had taken no role in any of the activities for which she had been convicted, stating:

Miss Ward was not a member of Óglaigh na hÉireann and was not used in any capacity by the organisation. She had nothing to do whatsoever with the [M62 coach bombing], the bombing of Euston station and the attack on Latimer Military College. Those acts were authorised operations carried out by units of the Irish Republican Army.

== Court of Appeal hearing ==
On 17 September 1991, the Home Secretary referred Ward's case to the Court of Appeal, with the primary reasons for this referral being the validity of the scientific evidence presented by Skuse and others at her trial, and that the prosecution had failed to disclose relevant evidence to her defence team, as they had been legally obliged to do. Ward's appeal specifically listed 43 items of evidence "consisting of, or contained in witness statements, notes of interviews and reports (including medical reports)" which had not been disclosed at her trial.

We have spoken of "the prosecution". In this term, we include four categories of individuals, namely (1) the three police forces: West Yorkshire, Thames Valley and Metropolitan which carried out the relevant investigations ... we may say the failure to disclose was limited to the West Yorkshire Police; (2) the staff of the Director of Public Prosecutions and counsel who advised them; (3) the psychiatrists who prepared medical reports on Miss Ward at the request of the prosecution; and (4) the forensic scientists who gave evidence at the trial. The responsibilities of the individuals involved in each of these four categories must be considered separately.

— Section of the transcript of Ward's 1992 appeal hearing, illustrating the collective failure to disclose evidence at her trial. May–June 1992.

In May 1992, Ward's lawyers illustrated the fundamental flaws in the physical evidence presented at her trial before three Court of Appeal judges. Her barrister, Michael Mansfield, QC, contended there had been a "significant and substantial non-disclosure" of evidence and information which had strongly indicated her innocence, and that of the 63 interviews West Yorkshire Police had conducted with Ward before and after her confession, only 34 had been disclosed at trial. Furthermore, the court also heard that the handling of lacquers, boot polish and other commodities in common public use by any individual would produce the same positive results presented at Ward's trial as proof of their having handled—or come into contact with—explosive substances, as contended by Skuse and others. This information was known to forensic experts in 1974, but had also never been disclosed at her original trial, or in the intervening years despite her protestations of innocence and subsequent developments with regard to other uncovered miscarriages of justice. (Note: The flawed scientific evidence presented against Ward at her trial was similar to that presented in the cases of the Guildford Four, the Birmingham Six and the Maguire Seven, each of which occurred shortly after Ward's arrest and conviction and all of which involved similar forced confessions and inaccurate scientific conclusions determined by Skuse.)

The evidence presented at Ward's appeal also heard that although police, forensic experts, psychiatrists and prosecutors had withheld multiple documents from the prosecution counsel at her original trial, that of the evidence the prosecution team had been provided access to, the prosecution had themselves withheld much of their own evidence from Ward's own defence counsel. The Crown also heard that although Ward was insistent she had not been subjected to physical violence by interrogators, at the time of her false confessions, she suffered from a severe personality disorder which had arisen from acute loneliness, insecurity and sexual identity conflicts, and that her confessions had been obtained under extreme duress and her desire to simply "be left alone".

The Court of Appeal unanimously ruled that Ward's conviction was "a grave miscarriage of justice" and conceded that her confession had ultimately been obtained by law enforcement personnel "under pressure to [obtain] a confession" from an individual regarding his or her culpability in the atrocities. Delivering final judgment at the conclusion of these appeal hearings, Lord Justice Iain Glidewell stated: "Our law does not permit a conviction to be secured by ambush." (Note: A subsequent ruling as a result of these hearings would mandate an absolute rule of disclosure regarding all material evidence obtained against a defendant.)

=== Release ===
Ward was released on bail, pending the conclusion of the legal proceedings of her appeal, on 11 May 1992, with Lord Justice Glidewell not immediately dismissing the charges against Ward, but stating a reversal of her sentence was fully expected. She exited the courtroom to a positive public reaction, having wrongly served over seventeen years' imprisonment. Although Ward was the first of eighteen innocent English and Irish nationals known to have been falsely convicted of IRA atrocities, she was the last to be released from custody.

Upon exiting the court, Ward shouted to all present, "Eighteen years! Freedom! After eighteen years, it's brilliant!" before being driven to a secret, safe address pending the conclusion of the legal hearings. Shortly thereafter, on 4 June, her conviction was formally overturned. Ward was later compensated for her wrongful conviction.

It looks as though there's a whole family who lost their lives there, including two children. There's one aged two and one aged five ... Twenty-eight is the oldest on there, going right down to the two children, which is quite sad.

— Jenny Berry, employee of Hartshead Moor service station, referencing the names and ages of the fatalities of the M62 coach bomb. October 2014.

== Aftermath ==
The most enduring consequence of the M62 coach bombing was the adoption of much stricter anti-terrorism laws in Great Britain and Northern Ireland. These laws enabled police to hold individuals suspected of terrorism for up to seven days without charge, and to deport these individuals to Northern Ireland to face trial, where special courts with specific rules applying to terrorism suspects were based.

A memorial to those killed in the M62 coach bombing was later erected at Hartshead Moor service station, where many of the casualties had received impromptu first aid following the explosion. Following a campaign by relatives of the deceased, a larger memorial was later erected several yards away from the entrance hall to the service station, close to an English oak tree planted in 2009 in memory of the deceased. This memorial stone also bears a plaque inscribed with the names and ages of those who died.

The service station itself is the venue for annual memorial services commemorating those killed, injured and bereaved by the atrocity. These annual services are regularly attended by the Mayors of Kirklees, Calderdale and Oldham in addition to members of the Royal British Legion.

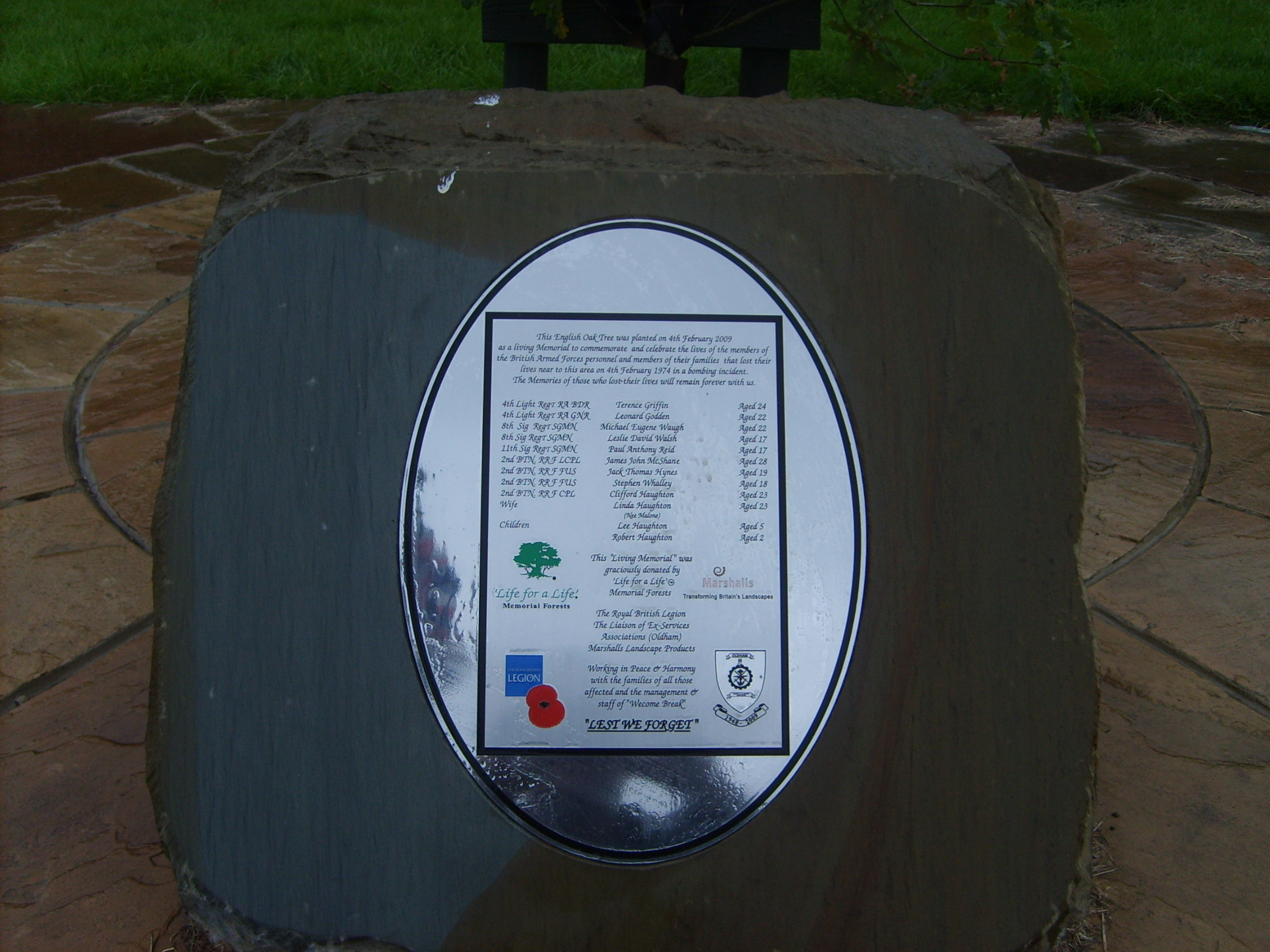
Memorial plaque at Hartshead Moor service station

A memorial plaque engraved with the names and ages of the fatalities of the M62 coach bomb was also unveiled in Oldham, the home town of two of the fatalities, in 2010.

Ward initially struggled with life as a free woman following the overturning of her conviction, in part because of the lack of a support structure she received from society after she had been formally exonerated. In 1996, Ward recollected to a reporter that, immediately prior to her release from prison, she was simply "given £35 and a hand-written note to produce at [the] DSS" before being released from custody with no individuals to offer advice, therapy, or other forms of support. As had earlier been the case with Gerry Conlon of the Guildford Four, Ward initially lived with solicitor Gareth Peirce until a secure home could be found for her.

Ward later wrote an autobiography, Ambushed: My Story, detailing her life, conviction, exoneration, and subsequent experiences following her release from prison. She later became a campaigner for prisoners' rights with the Britain and Ireland Human Rights Centre.

In October 1985, Frank Skuse was ordered by the Home Office to retire on the grounds of "limited efficiency" just days after the broadcasting of a World in Action documentary which strongly questioned his competency. Within a year of his retirement, all 350 cases in which Skuse had provided forensic evidence throughout his career had been reassessed.

The actual perpetrator or perpetrators of the M62 coach bombing were never arrested or convicted.

== See also ==
- Chronology of Provisional Irish Republican Army actions (1970–79)
- Good Friday Agreement – 1998 agreements between the UK and Ireland
- List of miscarriage of justice cases

== Cited works and further reading ==
- Amore, Anthony M. (2021). The Woman Who Stole Vermeer: The True Story of Rose Dugdale and the Russborough Art Heist. Pegasus Publishers. ISBN 978-1-713-59379-9.
- Brain, Timothy (2010). A History of Policing in England and Wales from 1974: A Turbulent Journey. Oxford University Press. ISBN 978-0-199-21866-0.
- Chalk, Peter (2012). The Encyclopedia of Terrorism – Volume 1. ABC-CLIO. ISBN 978-0-313-30895-6.
- Davis, Jennifer (2013). Wrongly Convicted: Miscarriages of Justice. RW Press Ltd. ISBN 978-1-909-28440-1.
- Eddleston, John J. (2000). Blind Justice: Miscarriages of Justice in Twentieth-century Britain. ABC-CLIO. ISBN 978-1-280-72006-2.
- Geraghty, Tony (1998). The Irish War: The Hidden Conflict Between the IRA and British Intelligence. Harper Collins. ISBN 978-0-006-38674-2.
- Gibson, Brian (1976). The Birmingham Bombs. Rose Publishing. ISBN 978-0-859-92070-4.
- Kudriavcevaite, Lina (2018). Miscarriages of Justice. The Case of Judith Ward. Verlag. ISBN 978-3-668-62870-0.
- Lane, Brian; Gregg, Wilfred (1994). The Encyclopedia of Mass Murder. Headline Book Publishing. ISBN 0-747-20897-2.
- McGladdery, Gary (2006). The Provisional IRA in England: The Bombing Campaign 1973–1997. Irish Academic Press. ISBN 978-0-7165-3374-0.
- Moysey, Steve (2019). The Road to Balcombe Street: The IRA Reign of Terror in London. Taylor & Francis Publishing. ISBN 978-1-136-74858-5.
- Mullin, Chris (1997). Error of Judgement: The Truth about the Birmingham Bombings. Poolbeg Press. ISBN 978-1-853-71365-1.
- Niblett, John (1997). Disclosure in Criminal Proceedings. Blackstone Publishing. ISBN 978-1-854-31598-4.
- Robins, Jon (2018). Guilty Until Proven Innocent: The Crisis in Our Justice System. Biteback Publishing. ISBN 978-1-785-90390-8.
- Ward, Judith (1993). Ambushed: My Story. Vermilion Press. ISBN 978-0-091-77820-0.
- Williams, Anne; Head, Vivian (2006). Terror Attacks: The Violent Expression of Desperation – IRA Coach Bomb. Futura. ISBN 0-7088-0783-6.
- Wilson, Colin (1985). Encyclopedia of Modern Murder 1962–1982. Bonanza Books. ISBN 978-0-517-66559-6.
