= Metanilic acid =

Names
- Preferred IUPAC name 3-Aminobenzene-1-sulfonic acid
- Other names: 3-Aminobenzenesulfonic acid; m-Anilinesulfonic acid

Identifiers
CAS Number	121-47-1
3D model (JSmol)	Interactive image
ChemSpider	8161
ECHA InfoCard	100.004.067
EC Number	204-473-6204-473-6
PubChem CID	8474
UNII	OT03NUM20P
UN number	2585
CompTox Dashboard (EPA)	DTXSID6024462
- InChI: InChI=1S/C6H7NO3S/c7-5-2-1-3-6(4-5)11(8,9)10/h1-4H,7H2,(H,8,9,10)
- SMILES: Nc1cccc(S(=O)(=O)O)c1

Properties
Chemical formula	C_{6}H_{7}NO_{3}S
Molar mass	173.19 g·mol^{−1}
Appearance	Beige powder
Density	1.69
Melting point	>300 °C
Solubility in water	Less than 1 mg/mL at 22 °C (72 °F)
Acidity (pK_{a})	3.74 (H_{2}O)
- Except where otherwise noted, data are given for materials in their standard state (at 25 °C [77 °F], 100 kPa). Infobox references

Metanilic acid is an isomer of sulfanilic acid having the amino group and sulfonic acid groups at a different relative position around the benzene ring. It is a white powder that is slightly soluble in water.

== Disappearing polymorph ==
The crystal structure called Form I is a disappearing polymorph that cannot be produced by researchers anymore while Form II and III still exist. The reason for this is that Form I is converted to another polymorph upon contact with a seed crystal and most places are contaminated with tiny amounts of Form II or III that are enough to prevent any viable amounts of Form I to be produced.

== See also ==
- Orthanilic acid
