= Hermann Pauly =

German chemist and inventor (1870–1950)

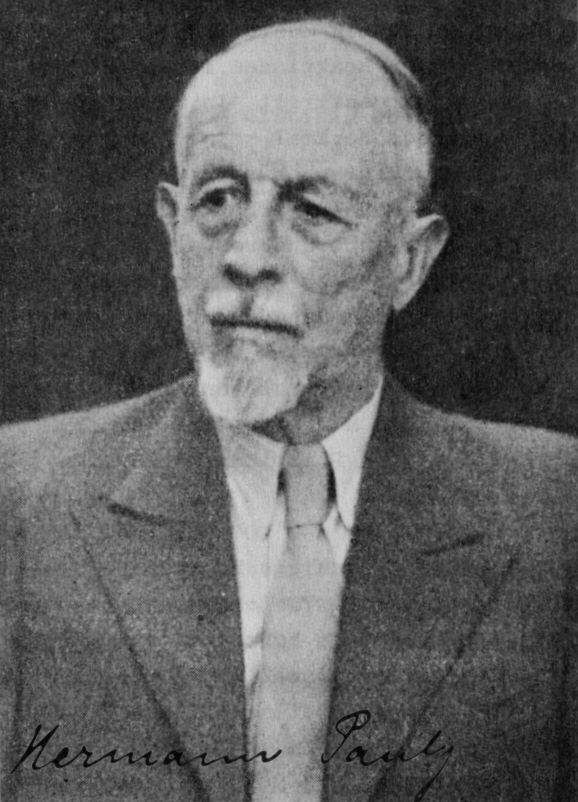
- Pauly c. 1932
- Born: 18 July 1870; Deutz, North German Confederation
- Died: 31 October 1950 (aged 80); Würzburg, West Germany
- Occupations: Chemist, inventor
- Known for: Pauly reaction

Hermann Pauly (18 July 1870 – 31 October 1950) was a German chemist and inventor. He is known for the Pauly reaction, a chemical test used for detecting the presence of tyrosine or histidine in proteins.

== Early years ==
Hermann Pauly was born in Deutz (now part of Cologne) on 18 July 1870. His father was Friedrich Hermann Pauly, a mine director, and his mother was Henriette Wintgens (or Wittgens). He graduated from the Adolfinum Moers Hermann secondary school, then studied natural sciences at the University of Giessen in Hesse, Leipzig University and the Rheinische Friedrich-Wilhelms University of Bonn. He became a member of the Corps Teutonia Bonn in 1890. He studied chemistry under Richard Anschütz in Bonn, and gained a PhD in 1894.

== Career ==
Pauly worked for a short period at Schering AG in Berlin, then became a research assistant to Hermann Emil Fischer at the Friedrich-Wilhelms-Universität. He then became a teaching assistant to Rudolf Nietzki at the University of Basel. He returned to Bonn, where he qualified as a professor in 1901. In 1904, he joined Albrecht Kossel at Heidelberg University. Pauly studied for his habilitation at the University of Würzburg, and was appointed an assistant professor in 1909. In 1912 he joined a private laboratory. In 1918 he was appointed a full Professor at Würzburg. Pauly became a member of the Corpsschleifenträger der Lusatia Leipzig in 1922. Hermann Pauly was awarded an honorary doctorate in medicine in 1932. He died in Würzburg on 31 October 1950.

== Work ==
Pauly published 71 papers on organic chemistry and physiological chemistry and filed at least 14 patents related to pharmaceutical products, fragrances and antiseptic preparations. (Note: The cuprammonium process for making rayon using Schweizer's reagent had been patented in 1890 by the French chemist Louis Henri Despeissis. Despeissis died in 1892 and his patent was not renewed. The partners Max Fremery and Johann Urban decided to move into artificial textile manufacture. They developed a version of the Despeissis process with the addition of a practical method for spinning the fiber. They filed the patent for this process in 1897 under Pauly's name so as not to alert their competitors. Pauly, then teaching the Mönchengladbach technical school, was not further involved in development of the product.) He correctly confirmed the finding of Thomas Aldrich that the formula for adrenaline was C_{9}H_{13}NO_{3} despite the fact that he was not working with pure samples, which only emerged much later. Pauly spent many years studying the diazo-reactions of proteins. In 1904 he published a paper that described what became known as the Pauly reaction, a method of detecting the presence of the amino acids tyrosine or histidine in proteins. In 1915 Pauly used diazo-benzene arsinic acid rather than diazo-benzene sulphonic acid to prepare an insoluble diazo-compound. He found that a tyrosine ring took on two molecules of the diazo-compound to form a bis-diazo-tyrosine. A histidine ring did the same. These discoveries proved invaluable to the work of Karl Landsteiner on immunity and allergy.

== Publications ==
- H. Pauly (1899). Patente u. a. Verfahren z. Darst. v. α-Tetramethylpyrrolidin-β-karbonsäureamiden u. deren n-Alkylderivaten. DRP 109346.
- H. Pauly (1902). "Studien in der Reihe der Hydropyrrole". Justus Liebig's Annalen der Chemie. 322: 77–130. doi:10.1002/jlac.19023220103.
- H. Pauly (1903). "Zur Kenntnis d. Adrenalins". Berichte der Deutschen Chemischen Gesellschaft. 36 (3): 2944–49. doi:10.1002/cber.19030360351.
- H. Pauly; A. Binz (1904). "Seide u. Wolle als Farbstoffbildner". Zs. F. Farben- U. Textilind. 3: 373 ff.
- H. Pauly (1904). "Über die Konstitution des Histidins. I. Mitteilung". Hoppe-Seyler's Zeitschrift für Physiologische Chemie. 42 (5–6). Hoppe-Seyler: 508–518. doi:10.1515/bchm2.1904.42.5-6.508.
- H. Pauly; K. Gundermann (1908). "Über jodbindende Systeme". Eiweiß-Spaltkörpern. 41: 3999–4012.
- H. Pauly; K. Gundermann (1908). Verfahren z. Darst. v. kernjodierten Imidazolen. DRP 223303.
- H. Pauly (1910). Über jodierte Abkömmlinge d. Imidazols u. d. Histidins. Vol. 43. pp. 2243–61.
- H. Pauly (1910). Über einige Verbindungen d. Histidins. Vol. 64. pp. 75–81.
- H. Pauly; E. Arauner (1928). "Über den Gegensatz zwischen Jod und Brom bei der Imidazolsubstitution". Journal für Praktische Chemie. 118: 33–47. doi:10.1002/prac.19281180107.
- H. Pauly; W. Neumann (1937). "Über pharmakologische Wirkungen jodierter Imidazolverbindungen, insbesondere auf den Stoffwechsel". Naunyn-Schmiedebergs Archiv für Experimentelle Pathologie und Pharmakologie. 187 (2–5): 571–580. doi:10.1007/BF01972058. S2CID 19885263.
- H. Pauly (1948). "Scheidung von Lignin-Komponenten, II. Mitteil.: Addukte mit Maleinsäureanhydrid". Chemische Berichte. 81 (5): 392–99. doi:10.1002/cber.19480810510.

== Sources ==
- Gerlach, Otto (1930). Kösener Corpslisten.
- Hoffman, Brian B. (2013-04-15). Adrenaline. Harvard University Press. ISBN 978-0-674-07473-6.
- Marquart, Hans-Wilhelm (2001). "Pauly, Hermann". Neue deutsche Biographie (in German). Vol. 20. Berlin: Pagenstecher – Püterich. ISBN 3-428-00201-6.
- Mazumdar, Pauline M. H. (2002-07-18). Species and Specificity: An Interpretation of the History of Immunology. Cambridge University Press. ISBN 978-0-521-52523-7.
- Pauly, Hermann (1894). Dissertation: Beiträge zur Kenntnis der Dioxobernsteinsäureester.
- Pauly, Hermann (1901). Habilitationsschrift: Studien in der Reihe der Hydropyrrole.
- Woodings, C (2001-04-30). Regenerated Cellulose Fibres. Elsevier. ISBN 978-1-85573-758-7.
