= Desulfonation reaction =

In organic chemistry, the desulfonation reaction is the hydrolysis of aryl and naphthyl sulfonic acids:

RC_{6}H_{4}SO_{3}H + H_{2}O → RC_{6}H_{5} + H_{2}SO_{4}

It is the reverse of sulfonation. The temperature of desulfonation correlates with the ease of the sulfonation.

== Applications in synthesis ==
This reactivity is exploited in the regiospecific preparation of di- and tri-substituted aromatic compounds. The approach exploits the meta-directing effect of the sulfonic acid group. 2-Chlorotoluene for example can be prepared by chlorination of p-toluenesulfonic acid, followed by hydrolysis. The method is also useful for the preparation of 2,6-dinitroaniline and 2-bromophenol via phenol-2,4-disulfonic acid.

In some cases, sulfonation gives a disulfonated product, which can be followed by mono-desulfonation to give a distinct monosulfonated product. 2-Hydroxynaphthalene-4-sulfonic acid is prepared by desulfonation of 2-hydroxynaphthalene-4,8-di-sulfonic acid, which in turn is produced by disulfonation of 2-naphthol.

== Related reaction ==
In contrast to the acid-catalyzed desulfonation is the alkaline fusion of aryl sulfonates, which is used to prepare phenols:

ArSO_{3}Na + 2 NaOH → ArONa + Na_{2}SO_{3} + H_{2}O (Ar = aryl)
ArONa + H^{+} → ArOH + Na^{+}

The first stage in alkaline fusion entails the dissolution of the aryl sulfonic acid or arylsulfonate salt in concentrated or even molten alkali metal base, such as a mixture of sodium hydroxide-potassium hydroxide at high temperatures, say 250 °C. One commercial process is the preparation of 1-hydroxynaphthalene-5-sulfonic acid, a precursor to dyes and pigments, by treatment of 1,5-naphthalenedisulfonic acid with hot aqueous sodium hydroxide.
