= Benzenesulfonic acid =

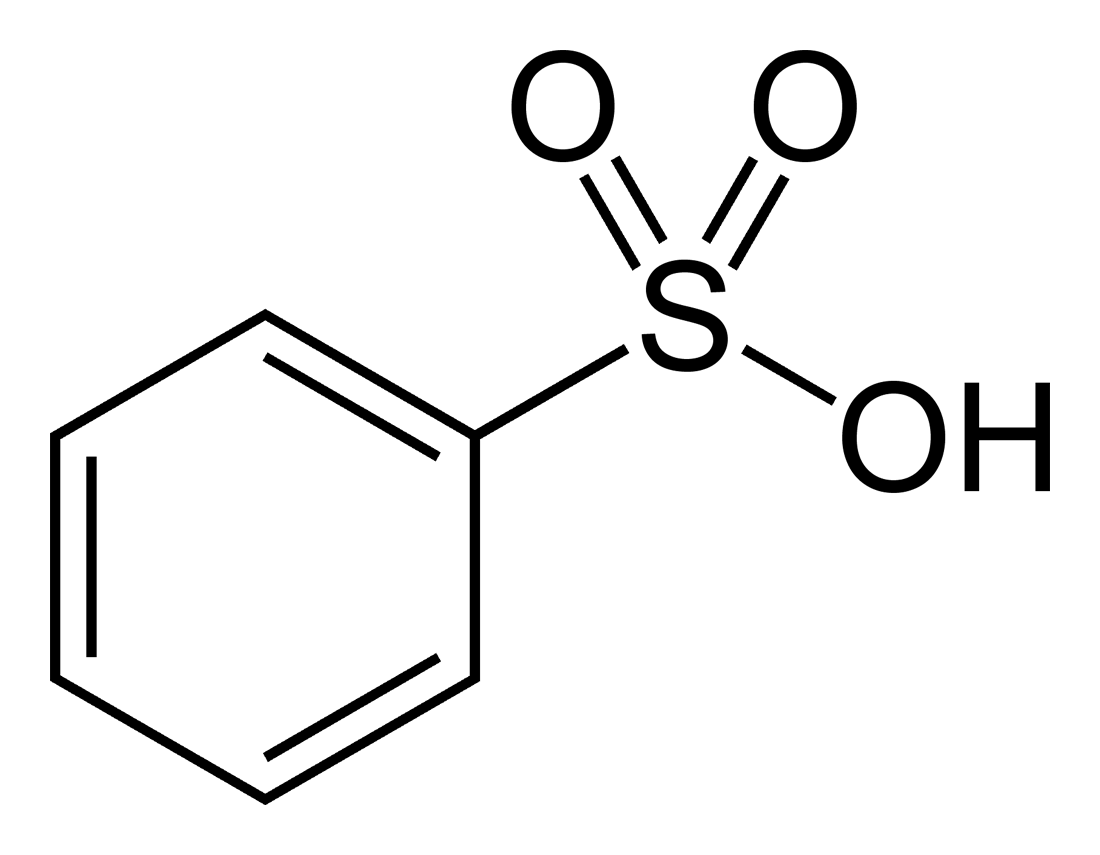

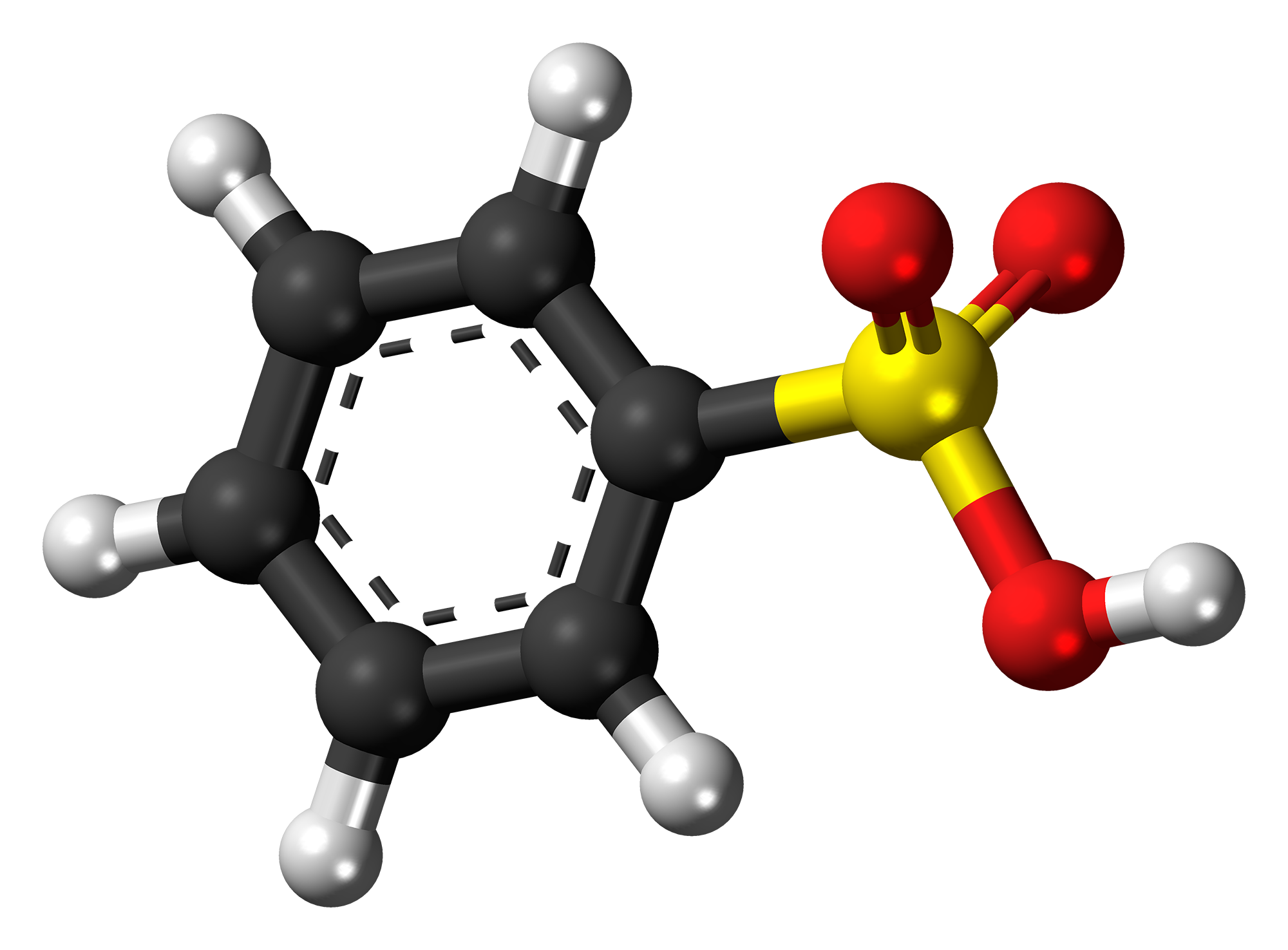

Names
- Preferred IUPAC name Benzenesulfonic acid
- Other names Benzene sulphonic acid; Benzenesulphonic acid; Phenylsulfonic acid; Phenylsulphonic acid; Besylic acid

Identifiers
CAS Number	98-11-3
3D model (JSmol)	Interactive image
ChEBI	CHEBI:64455
ChEMBL	ChEMBL1422641
ChemSpider	7093
ECHA InfoCard	100.002.399
EC Number	202-638-7
PubChem CID	7371
RTECS number	DB4200000
UNII	685928Z18A
UN number	2583, 2585, 1803
CompTox Dashboard (EPA)	DTXSID9024568
- InChI: InChI=1S/C6H6O3S/c7-10(8,9)6-4-2-1-3-5-6/h1-5H,(H,7,8,9) Key: SRSXLGNVWSONIS-UHFFFAOYSA-N; InChI=1/C6H6O3S/c7-10(8,9)6-4-2-1-3-5-6/h1-5H,(H,7,8,9) Key: SRSXLGNVWSONIS-UHFFFAOYAJ
- SMILES: OS(=O)(=O)c1ccccc1

Properties
Chemical formula	C_{6}H_{6}O_{3}S
Molar mass	158.17 g·mol^{−1}
Appearance	Colorless crystalline solid
Density	1.32 g/cm^{3} (47 °C)
Melting point	44 °C (hydrate); 51 °C (anhydrous)
Boiling point	190 °C (374 °F; 463 K)
Solubility in water	Soluble
Solubility in other solvents	Soluble in alcohol, insoluble in non-polar solvents
Acidity (pK_{a})	−2.8

Hazards
- Occupational safety and health (OHS/OSH)
Main hazards	Corrosive
- GHS labelling
Pictograms	(GHS05: Corrosive) (GHS07: Exclamation mark)
Signal word	Danger
Hazard statements	H290, H302, H314, H315, H319, H335
Precautionary statements	P234, P260, P264, P270, P271, P280, P301+P312, P301+P330+P331, P302+P352, P303+P361+P353, P304+P340, P305+P351+P338, P310, P312, P321, P330, P332+P313, P337+P313, P362, P363, P390, P403+P233, P404, P405, P501
Flash point	> 113 °C
Safety data sheet (SDS)	External MSDS

Related compounds
Related sulfonic acids	Sulfanilic acid p-Toluenesulfonic acid
- Except where otherwise noted, data are given for materials in their standard state (at 25 °C [77 °F], 100 kPa). verify (what is ?) Infobox references

Benzenesulfonic acid (conjugate base benzenesulfonate) is an organosulfur compound with the formula C_{6}H_{6}O_{3}S. It is the simplest aromatic sulfonic acid. It forms white deliquescent sheet crystals or a white waxy solid that is soluble in water and ethanol, slightly soluble in benzene and insoluble in nonpolar solvents like diethyl ether. It is often stored in the form of alkali metal salts. Its aqueous solution is strongly acidic.

== Preparation and structure ==
Benzenesulfonic acid is prepared from the sulfonation of benzene using concentrated sulfuric acid:

This conversion illustrates aromatic sulfonation, which has been called "one of the most important reactions in industrial organic chemistry".

As confirmed by X-ray crystallography, benzenesulfonic acid features tetrahedral sulfur attached to a planar phenyl ring. The C-S, S=O, and S-OH distances are respectively 1.75, 1.43 (avg), and 1.55 Å.

== Reactions ==
Benzenesulfonic acid exhibits the reactions typical of other aromatic sulfonic acids, forming sulfonamides, sulfonyl chloride, and esters. The sulfonation is reversed above 220 °C. Dehydration with phosphorus pentoxide gives benzenesulfonic acid anhydride ((C_{6}H_{5}SO_{2})_{2}O). Conversion to the corresponding benzenesulfonyl chloride (C_{6}H_{5}SO_{2}Cl) is effected with phosphorus pentachloride.

It is a strong acid, being almost fully dissociated in water.

Benzenesulfonic acid and related compounds undergo desulfonation when heated in water near 200 °C. The temperature of desulfonation correlates with the ease of the sulfonation:

C_{6}H_{5}SO_{3}H + H_{2}O → C_{6}H_{6} + H_{2}SO_{4}

For that reason, sulfonic acids are usually used as a protecting group, or as a meta director in electrophilic aromatic substitution.

The alkali metal salt of benzenesulfonic acid was once used in the industrial production of phenol. The process, sometimes called alkaline fusion, initially affords the phenoxide salt:

C_{6}H_{5}SO_{3}Na + 2 NaOH → C_{6}H_{5}ONa + Na_{2}SO_{3} + H_{2}O
C_{6}H_{5}ONa + HCl → C_{6}H_{5}OH + NaCl

The process has been largely displaced by the Hock process, which generates less waste.

== Uses ==
Benzenesulfonic acid is a relatively modest value. A variety of pharmaceutical drugs are prepared as benzenesulfonate salts and are known as besilates (INN) or besylates (USAN). It is the alkylated derivatives - linear alkylbenzene sulfonate - that are of intense commercial interest, being produced on the megaton scale annually as surfactants and detergents.
