= Pauly reaction =

Chemical test for amino acid detection

The Pauly reaction is a chemical test used for detecting the presence of tyrosine or histidine in proteins. It is named after German chemist Hermann Pauly, who first described the reaction. When proteins containing either tyrosine or histidine are reacted with diazotized sulfanilic acid under alkaline conditions, a red color is formed by a coupling reaction.
