= Collidinium p-toluenesulfonate =

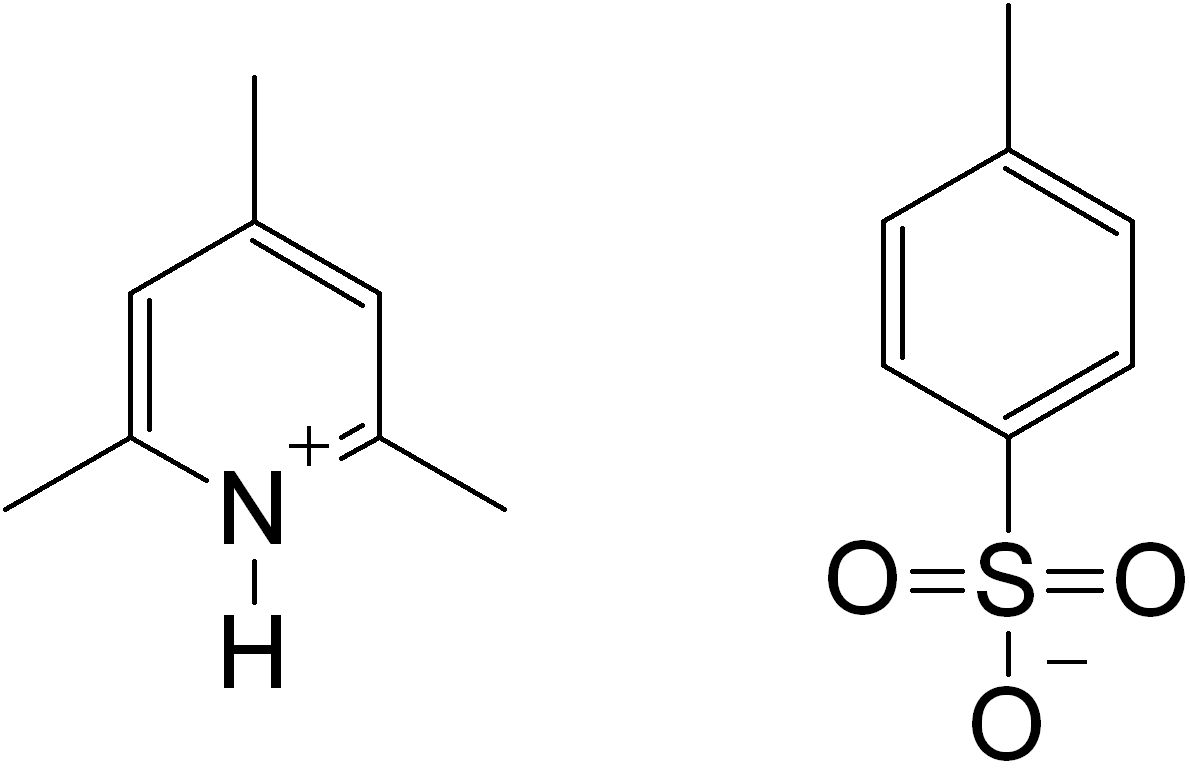

Names
- Preferred IUPAC name 2,4,6-Trimethylpyridin-1-ium 4-methylbenzene-1-sulfonate

Identifiers
CAS Number	59229-09-3
3D model (JSmol)	Interactive image
ChemSpider	2006679
ECHA InfoCard	100.153.836
PubChem CID	2724550
UNII	J4DW33JQX8
CompTox Dashboard (EPA)	DTXSID2058702
- InChI: InChI=1/C8H11N.C7H8O3S/c1-6-4-7(2)9-8(3)5-6;1-6-2-4-7(5-3-6)11(8,9)10/h4-5H,1-3H3;2-5H,1H3,(H,8,9,10) Key: VEXWNPGPVMYVDU-UHFFFAOYAF
- SMILES: [O-]S(=O)(=O)c1ccc(cc1)C.[nH+]1c(cc(cc1C)C)C

Properties
Chemical formula	C_{15}H_{19}NO_{3}S
Molar mass	293.38 g·mol^{−1}
- Except where otherwise noted, data are given for materials in their standard state (at 25 °C [77 °F], 100 kPa). Infobox references

Collidinium p-toluenesulfonate or CPTS is a salt between p-toluenesulfonic acid and collidine (2,4,6-trimethylpyridine). It is used as a mild glycosylation catalyst in chemistry.
