= Frank Skuse =

British forensic scientist

Frank Skuse (born ca. 1934) is a British former forensic scientist for the North West Forensic Laboratories based in Chorley, Lancashire. His flawed conclusions, eventually discredited, contributed to the convictions of Judith Ward and the Birmingham Six.

Others who claimed they were wrongfully convicted on Skuse's evidence include Ann Gillespie, a native of Donegal, who served almost 10 years of a 15-year sentence for conspiracy and explosive charges after a bomb exploded in a home she and her sister were visiting in Manchester.

== Early career ==
Skuse joined the Forensic Science Service in 1963, at the age of 28. In 1969 he was promoted to Principal Scientific Officer, at which grade he remained. Over his career, he developed a particular interest in explosives and arson.

== Summerland ==
As an employee of the Home Office North-West forensic science laboratory, Skuse helped investigate the 1973 Summerland Fire. He concluded that the fire had started in a plastic mini-golf hut.

== Judith Ward ==
In 1974, Skuse used the Griess test in which the presence of NO_{2}^{−} (nitrite ions) is detected in a sample by formation of a red azo dye. He used the extraction solvent ether. He analysed samples from Ward using thin layer chromatography in addition to the Griess test.

== Birmingham Six ==
In 1974, Skuse used the results of the Griess test to claim that Patrick Hill and William Power had handled explosives. Gas chromatography-mass spectrometry tests at a later date were negative for Power and contradicted the initial results for Hill.

Skuse's 99% certainty that Power and Hill had explosives traces on their hands was fundamentally opposed by defence expert Dr Hugh Kenneth Black FRIC (ex HM Chief Inspector of Explosives, Home Office). Skuse's evidence and testimony were preferred by The Hon. Mr Justice Bridge, the trial judge.

== Questions of competence ==
In 1981 and 1982 line managers at Chorley forensic science laboratory referred to a deterioration in the performance of Skuse and in January 1983 he was removed from reporting cases to court.

In October 1985 a World in Action documentary In The Interests of Justice concluded the real Birmingham pub bombers had gone free. Days after the TV programme, the Home Office retired Skuse, aged 51, from the Civil Service on the grounds of "limited effectiveness".

Throughout the following year, 350 of Skuse's cases - some dating back to 1966, were re-examined by the Laboratory Director. On 1 December 1986, another "World in Action" documentary: A Surprise Witness made public the doubts about Skuse's methods. Skuse was subsequently portrayed by actor David Ryall in the 1990 docudrama Who Bombed Birmingham?

== Appeals ==
=== Birmingham Six appeal ===
In 1991, The Court of Appeal stated that the Griess test should only be used as a gateway or preliminary test and that:

Dr Skuse's conclusion was wrong, and demonstrably wrong, judged even by the state of forensic science in 1974.

Caustic soda is used to break down the molecule of nitroglycerine to produce nitrite ions. The concentration is crucial to the test. If Skuse had used a dilute solution as he claimed, the test would react positive only on hands dripping with nitroglycerine, which was an absurdity. A stronger solution would react positive to any number of chemicals. Contaminants suggested included laboratory detergents used to wash the test containers and some soaps and lacquers, as well as the nitrocellulose polymer used on playing cards.

=== Judith Ward appeal ===
In 1993, The Court of Appeal stated:

there is...impressive...expert opinion...that Dr Skuse's tests...were of no value in establishing contact between the appellant and...explosives...

Scientific evidence showed that the samples taken by Skuse were 57 hours after the last bomb, and as such there could be no suggestion of explosives on Ward's hands. Skuse relied on one TLC test spot which was not pink, causing the judges to question his handling of the Griess test as well.

== Libel ==
The successful appeals ended sub judice issues. In March 1993, Skuse, wishing to prove he had not negligently misrepresented to the court, won an appeal allowing him to sue Granada TV for libel over the World in Action programmes. The action was partly funded by Sir James Goldsmith. he sued Granada using the defence that it was possible for someone to be wrong without being negligent.

The libel action was dropped in October 1994 following attempts by scientists on both sides to reproduce the tests Skuse carried out. No damages or costs were awarded. Ian McBride, producer of the 1985 programme, stated "We stand by our programme". Skuse's total legal bill was estimated at £290,000 In May 1995, his solicitor, Peter Carter-Ruck, commenced proceedings for £130,000 in unpaid fees.
