= Naphthol yellow S =

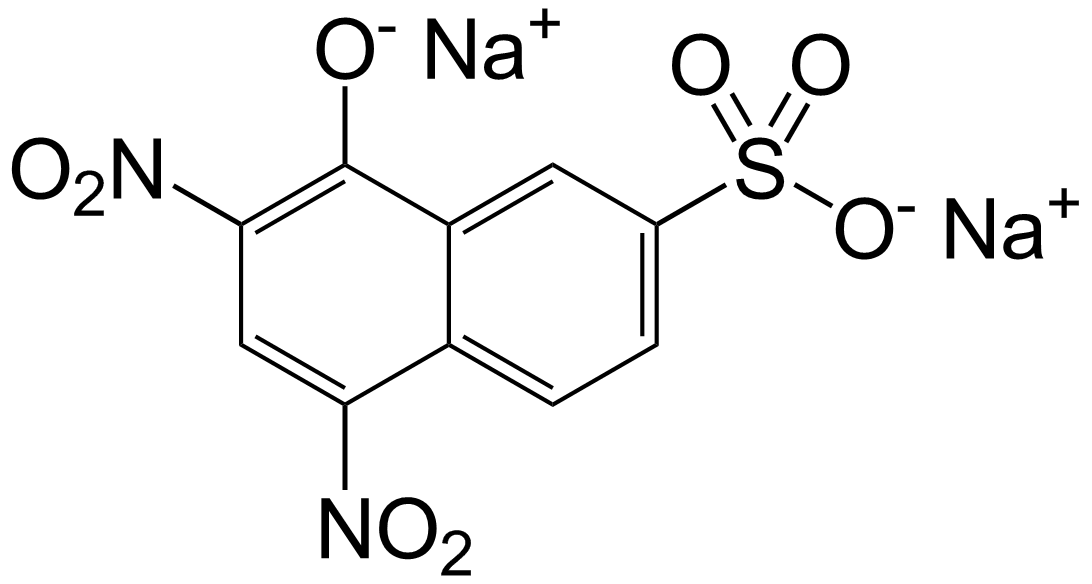

Names
- Preferred IUPAC name Disodium 5,7-dinitro-8-oxidonaphthalene-2-sulfonate
- Other names Acid Yellow 1; Food Yellow 1; Sodium flavianate; Flavianic acid, sodium salt; C.I. 10316, Acid Yellow S, Amacid Yellow S, C.I. 10316, C.I. Acid Yellow 1, C.I. Food Yellow 1

Identifiers
CAS Number	846-70-8
3D model (JSmol)	Interactive image
Beilstein Reference	3839220
ChEBI	CHEBI:87219
ChemSpider	2006234
ECHA InfoCard	100.011.537
EC Number	212-690-2
PubChem CID	2724063
UNII	08F8S9O3I5
CompTox Dashboard (EPA)	DTXSID1041718
- InChI: InChI=1S/C10H6N2O8S.2Na/c13-10-7-3-5(21(18,19)20)1-2-6(7)8(11(14)15)4-9(10)12(16)17;;/h1-4,13H,(H,18,19,20);;/q;2*+1/p-2 Key: CTIQLGJVGNGFEW-UHFFFAOYSA-L
- SMILES: C1=CC2=C(C=C1S(=O)(=O)[O-])C(=C(C=C2[N+](=O)[O-])[N+](=O)[O-])[O-].[Na+].[Na+]

Properties
Chemical formula	C_{10}H_{4}N_{2}Na_{2}O_{8}S
Molar mass	358.19 g·mol^{−1}
Appearance	yellow solid

Hazards
- GHS labelling
Pictograms	(GHS07: Exclamation mark) (GHS08: Health hazard)
Signal word	Warning
Hazard statements	H317, H373
Precautionary statements	P260, P272, P280, P302+P352, P314, P333+P313, P363, P501
- Except where otherwise noted, data are given for materials in their standard state (at 25 °C [77 °F], 100 kPa). verify (what is ?) Infobox references

Naphthol yellow S is an organic compound with the formula C_{10}H_{4}(SO_{3}Na)(ONa)(NO_{2})_{2}. It is one of several isomers of sulfonated dinitro-1-naphthol. It is prepared by nitration of a trisulfonate of 1-naphthol, a process involving replacement of sulfonate groups with nitro. It is a derivative of 1-naphthol. At one time it was a popular food colorant but it was delisted in 1959 in the U.S.
