= Sulfanilic acid =

Chemical compound

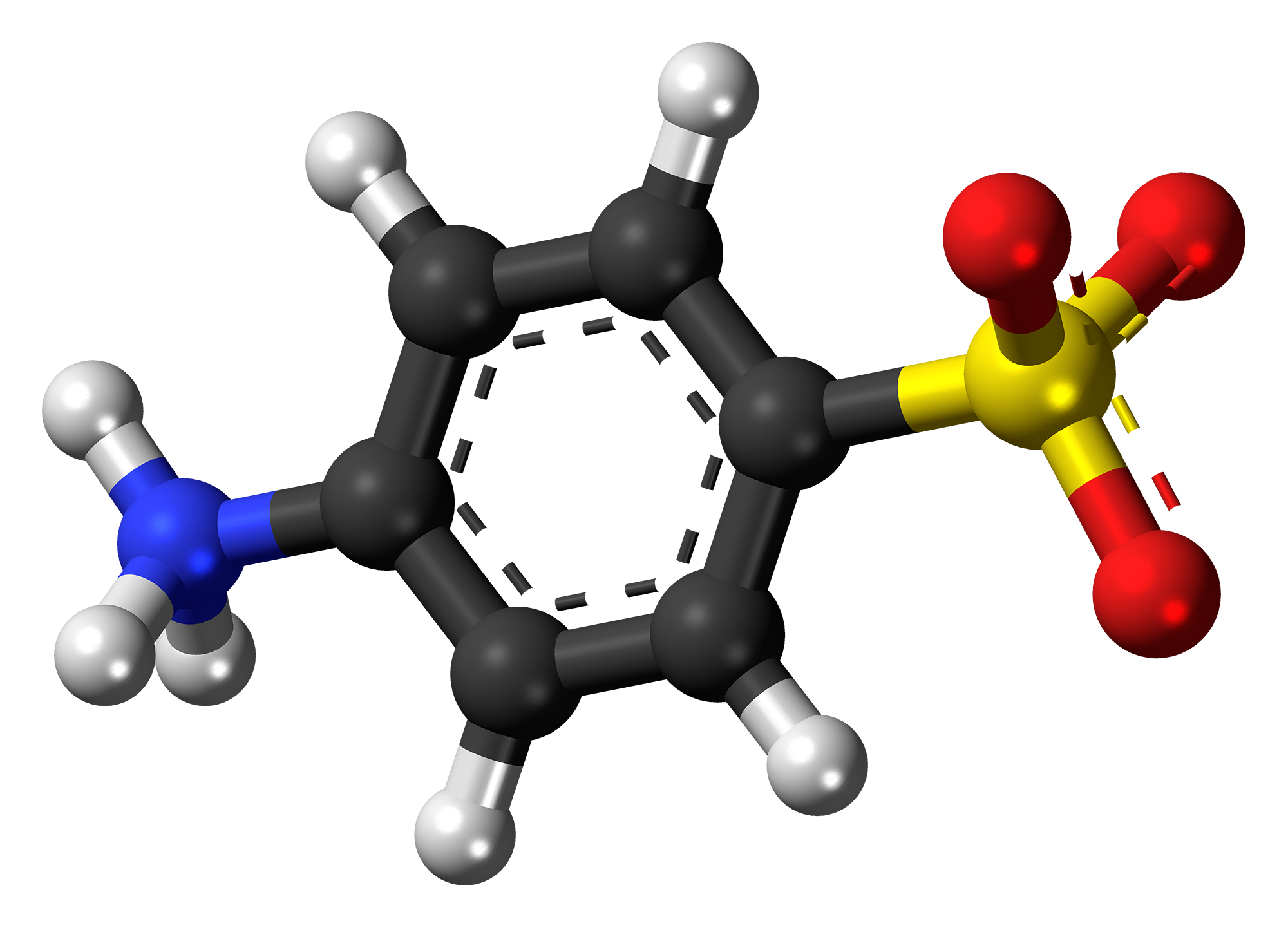

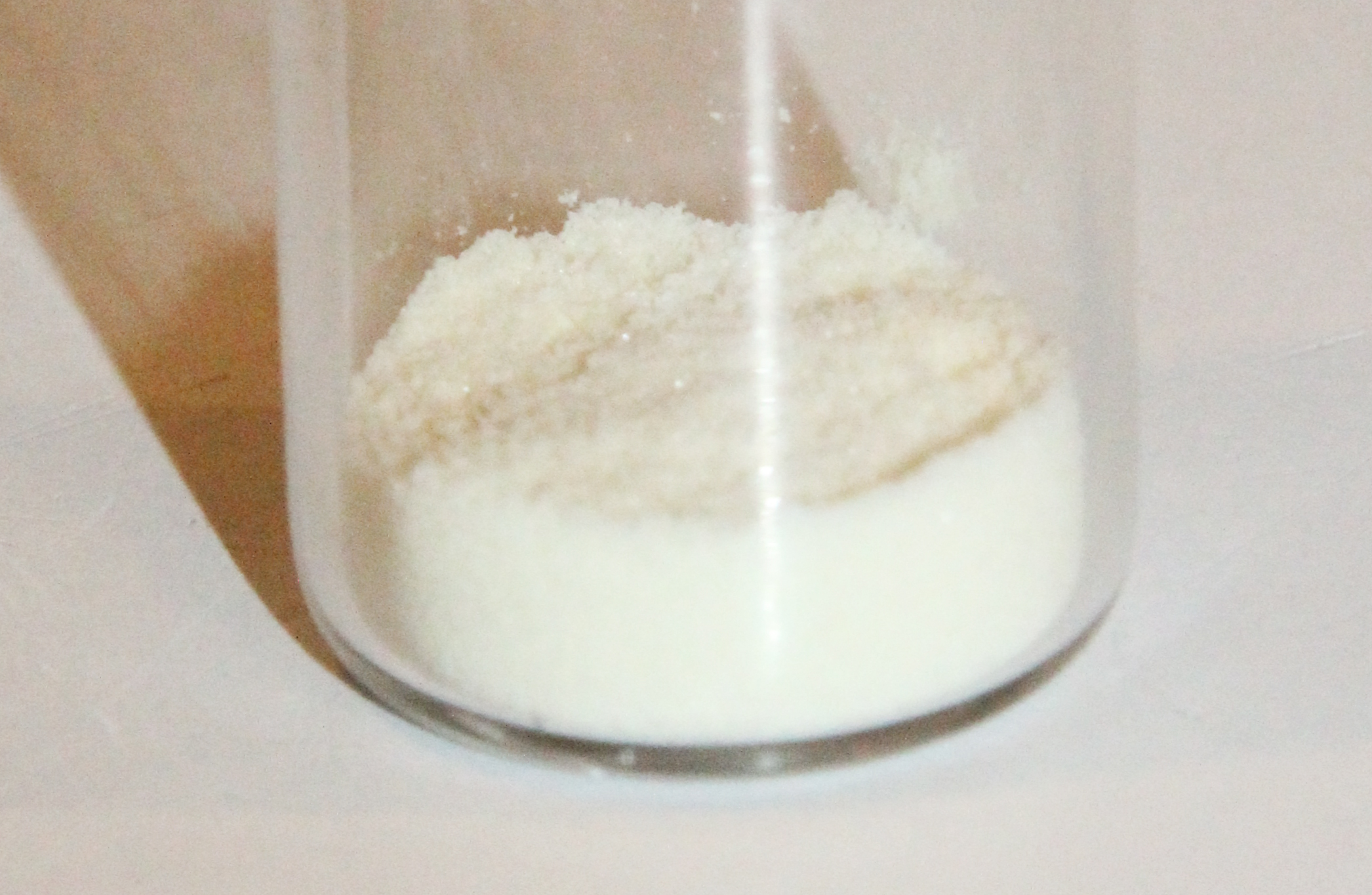

Names
- Preferred IUPAC name 4-Aminobenzene-1-sulfonic acid
- Other names 4-Aminobenzenesulfonic acid p-Aminobenzenesulfonic acid Sulfanilic acid (not retained)

Identifiers
CAS Number	121-57-3
3D model (JSmol)	Interactive image
ChEBI	CHEBI:27500
ChEMBL	ChEMBL1566888
ChemSpider	8166
ECHA InfoCard	100.004.075
EC Number	204-482-5
Gmelin Reference	101735
KEGG	101735
PubChem CID	8479
UNII	434Z8C2635
UN number	2585
CompTox Dashboard (EPA)	DTXSID6024464
- InChI: InChI=1S/C6H7NO3S/c7-5-1-3-6(4-2-5)11(8,9)10/h1-4H,7H2,(H,8,9,10) Key: HVBSAKJJOYLTQU-UHFFFAOYSA-N; InChI=1/C6H7NO3S/c7-5- 1-3-6(4-2-5)11(8,9)10/h1-4H, 7H2,(H,8,9,10)/f/h8H
- SMILES: OS(=O)(=O)c1ccc(N)cc1

Properties
Chemical formula	C_{6}H_{7}NO_{3}S
Molar mass	173.19
Density	1.485
Melting point	288 °C (550 °F; 561 K)
Solubility in water	12.51 g/L
Acidity (pK_{a})	3.23 (H_{2}O)

Hazards
- GHS labelling
Pictograms	(GHS07: Exclamation mark)
Signal word	Warning
Hazard statements	H315, H317, H319
Precautionary statements	P261, P264, P264+P265, P272, P280, P302+P352, P305+P351+P338, P321, P333+P317, P337+P317, P362+P364, P501

Related compounds
Related sulfonic acids	Benzenesulfonic acid p-Toluenesulfonic acid
- Except where otherwise noted, data are given for materials in their standard state (at 25 °C [77 °F], 100 kPa). verify (what is ?) Infobox references

Sulfanilic acid (4-aminobenzenesulfonic acid) is an organic compound with the formula H_{3}NC_{6}H_{4}SO_{3}. It is an off-white solid. It is a zwitterion, which explains its high melting point compared to the related compounds aniline and benzenesulfonic acid. It is a common building block in organic chemistry.

== Synthesis ==
Sulfanilic acid can be produced by sulfonation of aniline with concentrated sulfuric acid. This proceeds via phenylsulfamic acid; a zwitterion with a N-S bond. Eugen Bamberger originally proposed a mechanism involving a series of intramolecular rearrangements, with phenylsulfamic acid forming orthanilic acid, which rearranged to sulfanilic acid on heating. Subsequent radiosulphur studies showed that the process is intermolecular, with the phenylsulfamic acid desulfating to generate sulfur trioxide, which then reacts with aniline at the para position in manner similar to a Bamberger rearrangement.

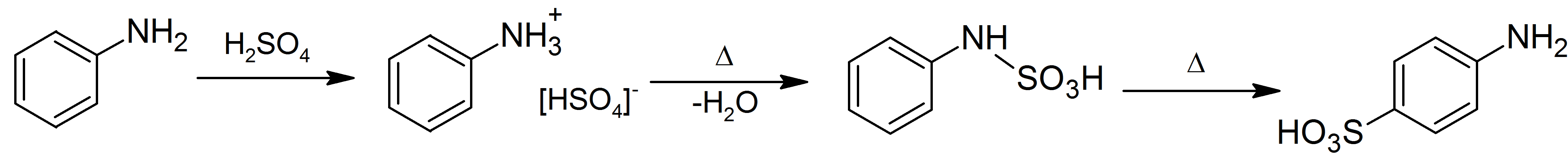

== Applications ==
As the compound readily forms diazo compounds, it is used to make dyes and sulfa drugs. This property is also used for the quantitative analysis of nitrate and nitrite ions by diazonium coupling reaction with N-(1-Naphthyl)ethylenediamine, resulting in an azo dye, and the concentration of nitrate or nitrite ions were deduced from the color intensity of the resulting red solution by colorimetry.

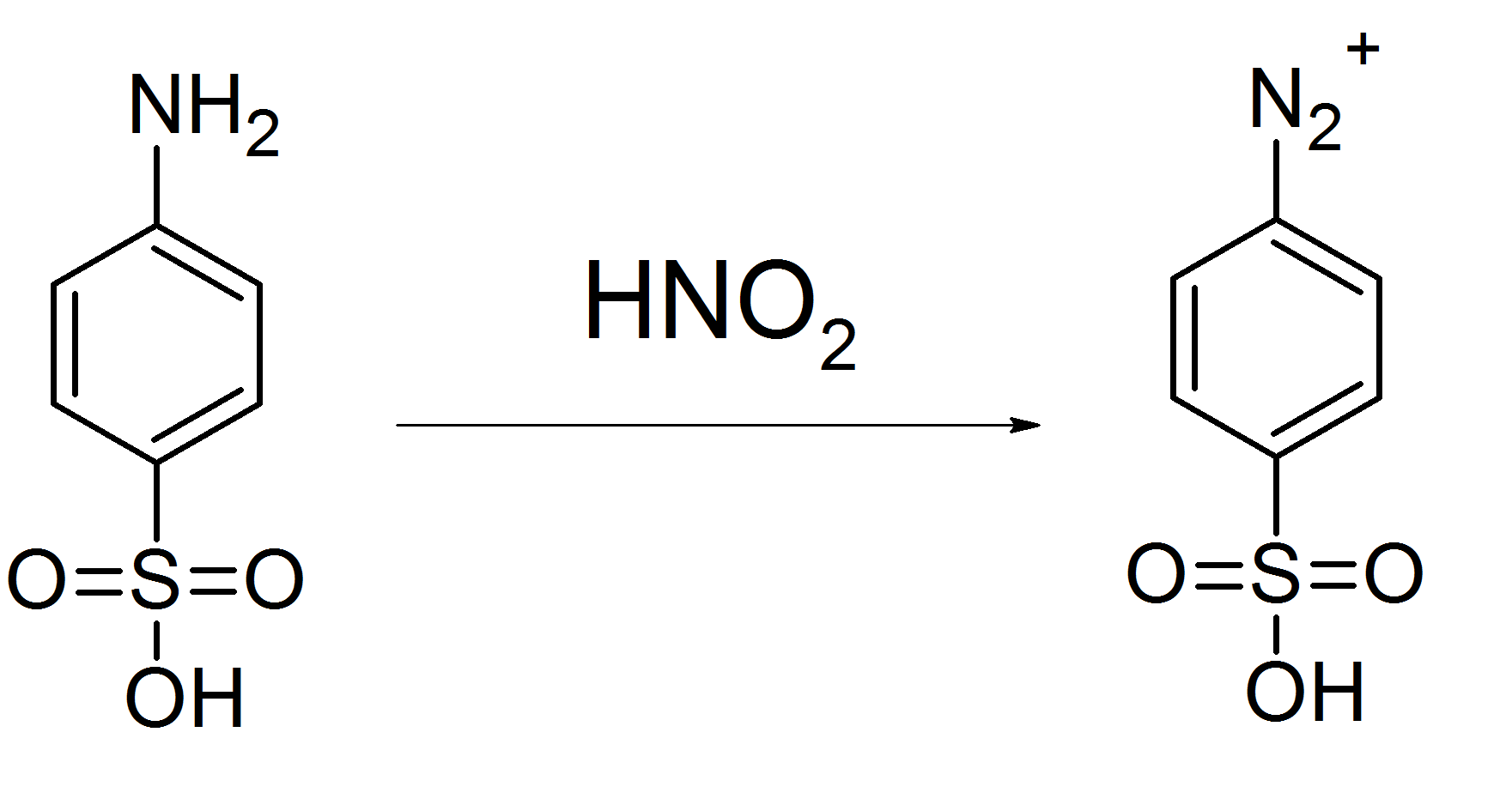

It is also used as a standard in combustion analysis and in the Pauly reaction.

== Environmental aspects ==
Reflecting its wide use, sulfanilic acid is found in the leachates of landfills. It is produced by reduction of some azo dyes.

== Derivatives ==
- Methyl orange (azo coupling with dimethylaniline)
- Acid orange 7 (azo coupling with 2-naphthol)
- Chrysoine resorcinol (azo coupling with resorcinol)

== See also ==
- Orthanilic acid
- Metanilic acid
- Sulfanilamide
