= P-Toluenesulfonic acid =

p-Toluenesulfonic acid
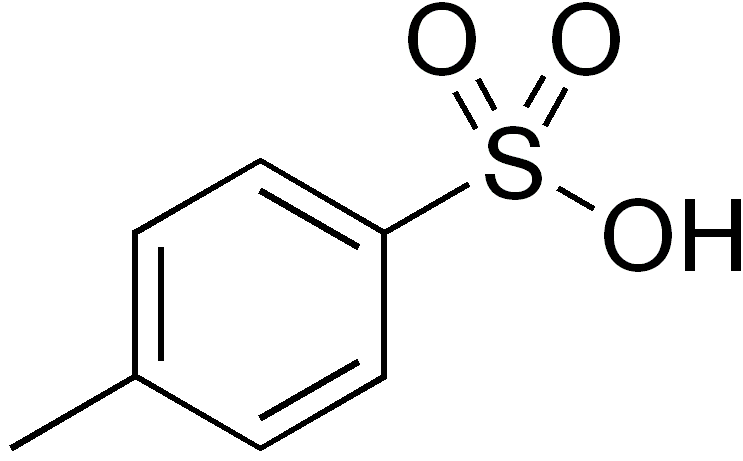

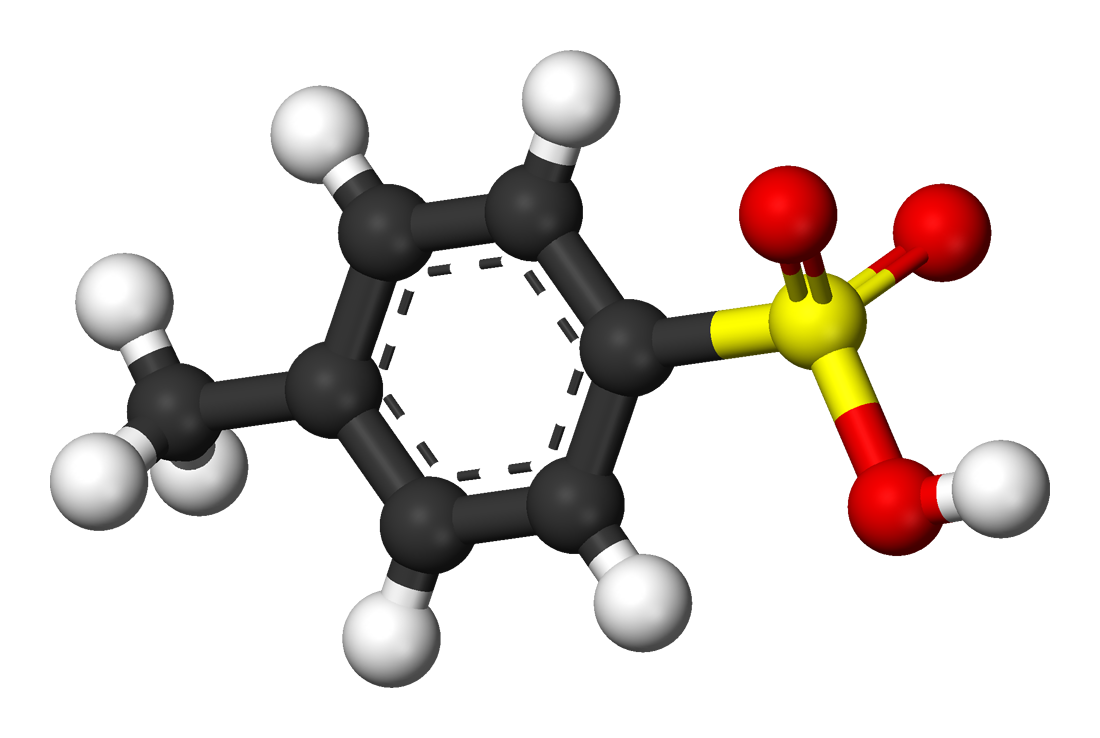

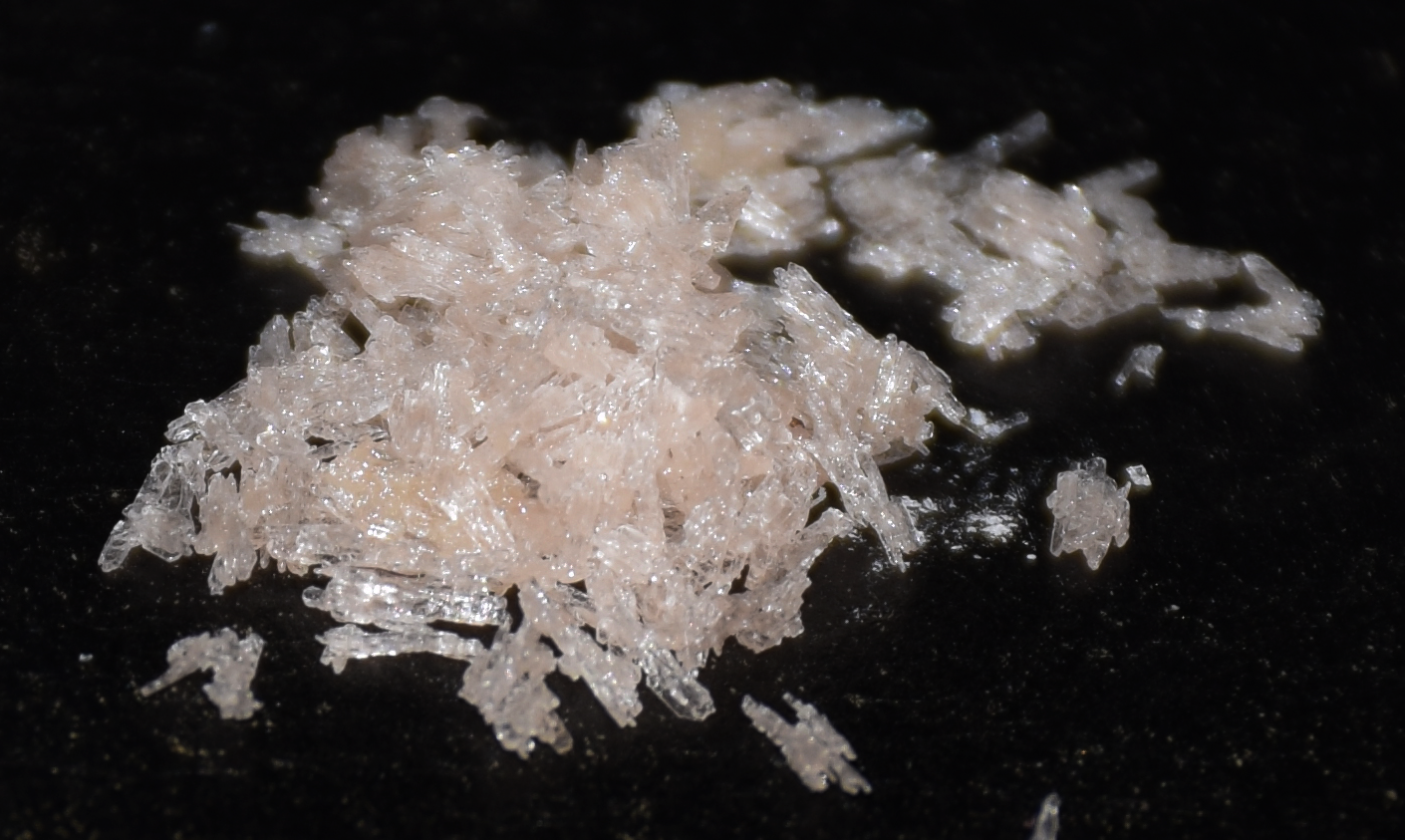
- Slightly impure sample of the monohydrate

Names
- Preferred IUPAC name 4-Methylbenzene-1-sulfonic acid
- Other names 4-Methylbenzenesulfonic acid Tosylic acid Tosic acid para-Toluenesulfonic acid PTSA pTsOH; TsOH

Identifiers
CAS Number	104-15-4; 6192-52-5 (monohydrate)
3D model (JSmol)	Interactive image
ChEBI	CHEBI:27849
ChEMBL	ChEMBL541253
ChemSpider	5876
DrugBank	DB03120
ECHA InfoCard	100.002.891
KEGG	C06677
PubChem CID	6101
UNII	QGV5ZG5741; 3BTO78GAFF (monohydrate)
CompTox Dashboard (EPA)	DTXSID0026701
- InChI: InChI=1S/C7H8O3S/c1-6-2-4-7(5-3-6)11(8,9)10/h2-5H,1H3,(H,8,9,10) Key: JOXIMZWYDAKGHI-UHFFFAOYSA-N; InChI=1/C7H8O3S/c1-6-2-4-7(5-3-6)11(8,9)10/h2-5H,1H3,(H,8,9,10) Key: JOXIMZWYDAKGHI-UHFFFAOYAG
- SMILES: Cc1ccc(cc1)S(=O)(=O)O

Properties
Chemical formula	C_{7}H_{8}O_{3}S
Molar mass	172.20 g/mol (anhydrous); 190.22 g/mol (monohydrate)
Appearance	colorless (white) solid
Density	1.24 g/cm^{3}
Melting point	105 to 107 °C (221 to 225 °F; 378 to 380 K) (monohydrate); 38 °C (100 °F; 311 K) (anhydrous)
Boiling point	140 °C (284 °F; 413 K) at 20 mmHg
Solubility in water	67 g/100 10.5281/zenodo.7236452mL
Acidity (pK_{a})	−1.3 (aqueous); 8.5 (acetonitrile)

Structure
Molecular shape	tetrahedral at S

Hazards
- Occupational safety and health (OHS/OSH)
Main hazards	skin irritant
- GHS labelling
Pictograms	(GHS07: Exclamation mark)
Signal word	Warning
Hazard statements	H315, H319, H335
Precautionary statements	P302+P352, P305+P351+P338
Safety data sheet (SDS)	External MSDS

Related compounds
Related sulfonic acids	Benzenesulfonic acid Sulfanilic acid
- Except where otherwise noted, data are given for materials in their standard state (at 25 °C [77 °F], 100 kPa). verify (what is ?) Infobox references

para-Toluenesulfonic acid (PTSA, pTSA, or pTsOH) or tosylic acid (TsOH) is an organic compound with the formula CH_{3}C_{6}H_{4}SO_{3}H. It is a white extremely hygroscopic solid that is soluble in water, alcohols, and other polar organic solvents. The CH_{3}C_{6}H_{4}SO_{2} group is known as the tosyl group and is often abbreviated as Ts or Tos. Most often, TsOH refers to the monohydrate, TsOH^{.}H_{2}O.

As with other aryl sulfonic acids, TsOH is a strong organic acid. It is about one million times stronger than benzoic acid. It is one of the few strong acids that is solid and therefore is conveniently weighed and stored.

== Preparation and uses ==
TsOH is prepared on an industrial scale by the sulfonation of toluene. Common impurities include benzenesulfonic acid and sulfuric acid. TsOH is most often supplied as the monohydrate, and it may be necessary to remove the complexed water before use. Impurities can be removed by recrystallization from its concentrated aqueous solution followed by azeotropic drying with toluene.

TsOH finds use in organic synthesis as an "organic-soluble" strong acid. Examples of uses include:

- Acetalization of an aldehyde.
- Fischer–Speier esterification
- Transesterification reactions

== Tosylates ==
Alkyl tosylates are alkylating agents because tosylate is electron-withdrawing as well as a good leaving group. Tosylate is a pseudohalide. Toluenesulfonate esters undergo nucleophilic attack or elimination. Reduction of tosylate esters gives the hydrocarbon. Thus, tosylation followed by reduction allows for the deoxygenation of alcohols.

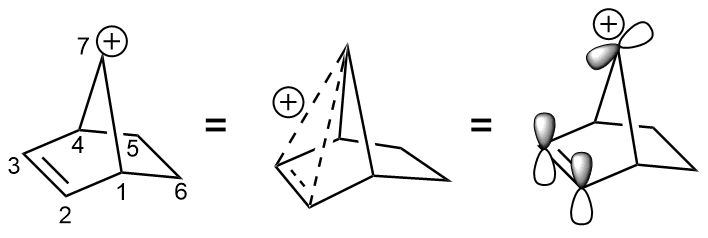
Structures of the 7-norbornenyl cation with p-orbital stabilization.

In a famous and illustrative use of tosylate as a leaving group, the 2-norbornyl cation was formed by an elimination reaction of 7-norbornenyl tosylate. The elimination occurs 10^{11} times faster than the solvolysis of anti-7-norbornyl Para-toluenesulfonate.

Tosylates are also protecting groups for alcohols. They are prepared by combining the alcohol with 4-toluenesulfonyl chloride in the presence of a base. These reactions are usually performed in an aprotic solvent, often pyridine, which additionally acts as a base.

== Reactions ==
- TsOH may be converted to para-toluenesulfonic anhydride by heating with phosphorus pentoxide.
- When heated with acid and water, TsOH undergoes hydrolysis to toluene:

CH_{3}C_{6}H_{4}SO_{3}H + H_{2}O → C_{6}H_{5}CH_{3} + H_{2}SO_{4}

This reaction is general for aryl sulfonic acids.

== See also ==
- Tosyl
- Collidinium p-toluenesulfonate
