= Acid orange 5 =

Names
- Preferred IUPAC name Sodium 4-[(E)-(4-anilinophenyl)diazenyl]benzene-1-sulfonate
- Other names Fast yellow; Tropaeolin OO

Identifiers
CAS Number	554-73-4
3D model (JSmol)	Interactive image
ChemSpider	10660
ECHA InfoCard	100.008.248
PubChem CID	11133
UNII	VR8Q3R288W
CompTox Dashboard (EPA)	DTXSID8060294
- InChI: InChI=1S/C18H15N3O3S.Na/c22-25(23,24)18-12-10-17(11-13-18)21-20-16-8-6-15(7-9-16)19-14-4-2-1-3-5-14;/h1-13,19H,(H,22,23,24);/q;+1/p-1/b21-20+; Key: MLVYOYVMOZFHIU-ANVLNOONSA-M; InChI=1/C18H15N3O3S.Na/c22-25(23,24)18-12-10-17(11-13-18)21-20-16-8-6-15(7-9-16)19-14-4-2-1-3-5-14;/h1-13,19H,(H,22,23,24);/q;+1/p-1/b21-20+; Key: MLVYOYVMOZFHIU-LGLICYIRBD
- SMILES: c1ccc(cc1)Nc2ccc(cc2)/N=N/c3ccc(cc3)S(=O)(=O)[O-].[Na+]

Properties
Chemical formula	C_{18}H_{14}N_{3}NaO_{3}S
Molar mass	375.38 g/mol
- Except where otherwise noted, data are given for materials in their standard state (at 25 °C [77 °F], 100 kPa). Infobox references

Tropaeolin OO (pH indicator)
below pH 1.4		above pH 3.2
(red) 1.4	⇌	3.2 (orange)

Acid orange 5 is a compound with formula Na(C_{6}H_{5}NHC_{6}H_{4}N=NC_{6}H_{4}SO_{3}). It is an azo dye. It is also used as a pH indicator; it is red in pH under 1.4, orange-yellow in pH over 3.2.

== Preparation ==
Acid orange 5 may be prepared by diazotization of sulfanilic acid, followed by reaction with diphenylamine:

HO_{3}SC_{6}H_{4}N^{+}_{2} + (C_{6}H_{5})_{2}NH → HO_{3}SC_{6}H_{4}N=NC_{6}H_{4}N(H)C_{6}H_{5} + H^{+}
