= N-(1-Naphthyl)ethylenediamine =

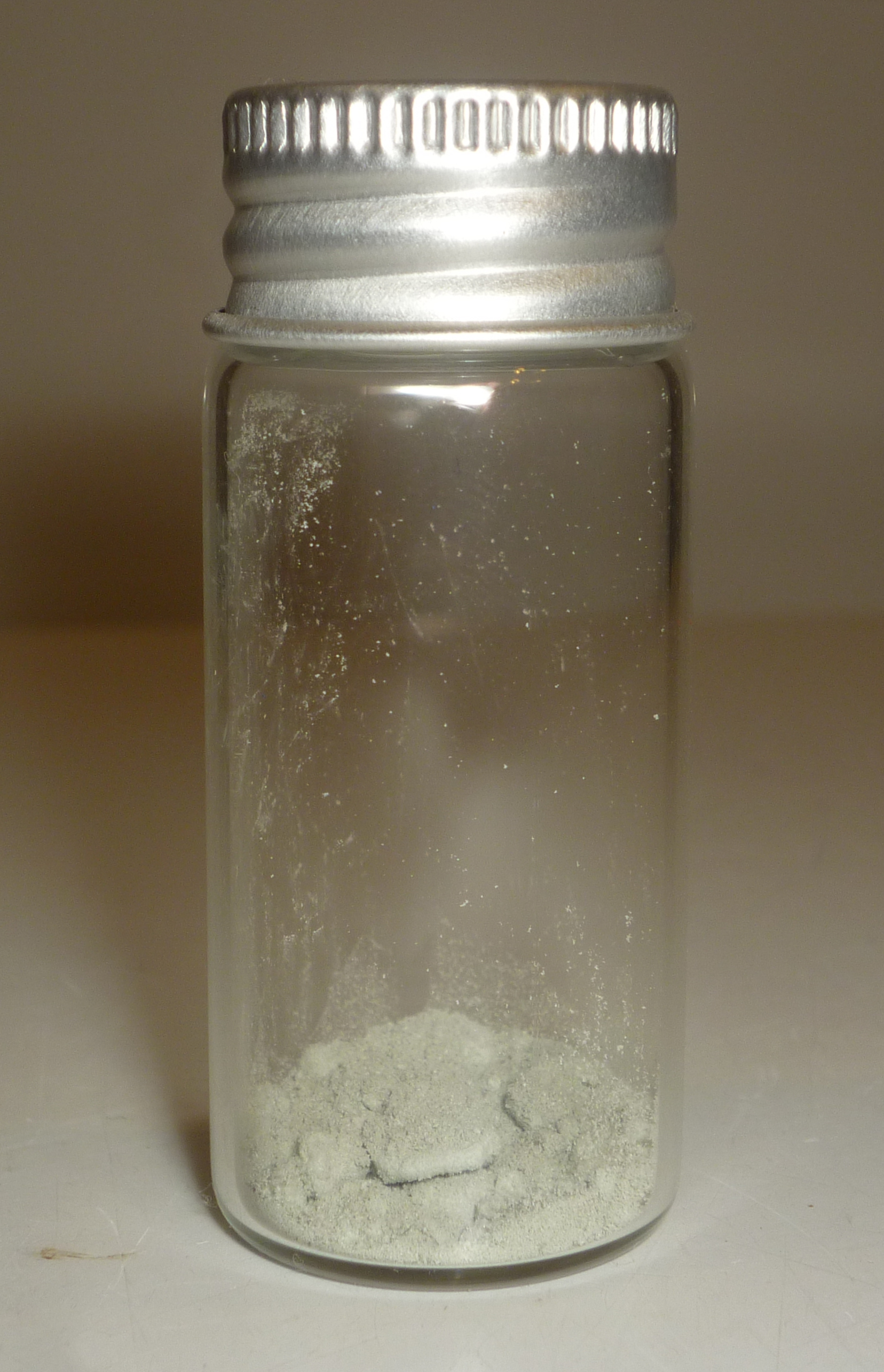

Names
- Preferred IUPAC name N^{1}-(Naphthalen-1-yl)ethane-1,2-diamine
- Other names N-1-Naphthyl-1,2-ethanediamine; Naphthylethylenediamine

Identifiers
CAS Number	551-09-7; 1465-25-4 (dihydrochloride)
3D model (JSmol)	Interactive image
Beilstein Reference	2803527
ChEBI	CHEBI:53510
ChEMBL	ChEMBL1214195
ChemSpider	14379
ECHA InfoCard	100.008.176
EC Number	208-992-9
PubChem CID	15107
UNII	02X37521XE
CompTox Dashboard (EPA)	DTXSID7043744
- InChI: InChI=1S/C12H14N2/c13-8-9-14-12-7-3-5-10-4-1-2-6-11(10)12/h1-7,14H,8-9,13H2 Key: NULAJYZBOLVQPQ-UHFFFAOYSA-N; InChI=1/C12H14N2/c13-8-9-14-12-7-3-5-10-4-1-2-6-11(10)12/h1-7,14H,8-9,13H2 Key: NULAJYZBOLVQPQ-UHFFFAOYAJ
- SMILES: NCCNc1c2ccccc2ccc1

Properties
Chemical formula	C_{12}H_{14}N_{2}
Molar mass	186.258 g·mol^{−1}
Appearance	Off-white crystals (dihydrochloride)
Odor	Odorless
Density	380 kg/m^{3} (dihydrochloride)
Solubility in water	30 g/1000 mL (dihydrochloride, 20 °C)

Hazards
- Occupational safety and health (OHS/OSH)
Main hazards	Irritant
- GHS labelling
Pictograms	(GHS07: Exclamation mark)
Signal word	Warning
Hazard statements	H315, H319
Precautionary statements	P264, P280, P302+P352, P305+P351+P338, P332+P313, P337+P313
NFPA 704 (fire diamond)	2 1 0
Flash point	Nonflammable
- Except where otherwise noted, data are given for materials in their standard state (at 25 °C [77 °F], 100 kPa). Infobox references

N-(1-Naphthyl)ethylenediamine is an organic compound. It is commercially available as part of Griess reagents, which find application in quantitative inorganic analysis of nitrates, nitrite and sulfonamide in blood, using the Griess test.

== Preparation ==
This compound can be prepared by the reaction of 1-naphthylamine with 2-chloroethanamine. It is commercially available as the dihydrochloride salt.

== Properties ==
N-(1-Naphthyl)ethylenediamine undergoes most reactions typical to naphthylamine and primary amines such as diazotation. Similar to its analog ethylenediamine, it can also act as a bidentate ligand to give several coordination compounds. However, it is a weaker bidentate ligand as the nitrogen atom in the naphthylamine group is weakly coordinating due to the dispersal of charge by resonance. For example, it reacts with potassium tetrachloroplatinate in aqueous solution to give (N-1-naphthyl-ethylenediamine)-dichloroplatinum(II).

== Uses ==
N-(1-Naphthyl)ethylenediamine dihydrochloride is widely used in the quantitative analysis of nitrate and nitrite in water samples by colorimetry. It readily undergoes a diazonium coupling reaction in the presence of nitrite to give a strongly colored azo compound. Sample containing nitrite ions is first neutralized and then treated with dilute hydrochloric acid at 0 - 5 °C to give nitrous acid. Then an excess but fixed volume of sulfanilamide and N-(1-naphthyl)ethylenediamine dihydrochloride solution is added. With nitrous acid as the limiting reagent, the azo coupling reaction produces an azo dye quantitatively with respect to the nitrite ions:

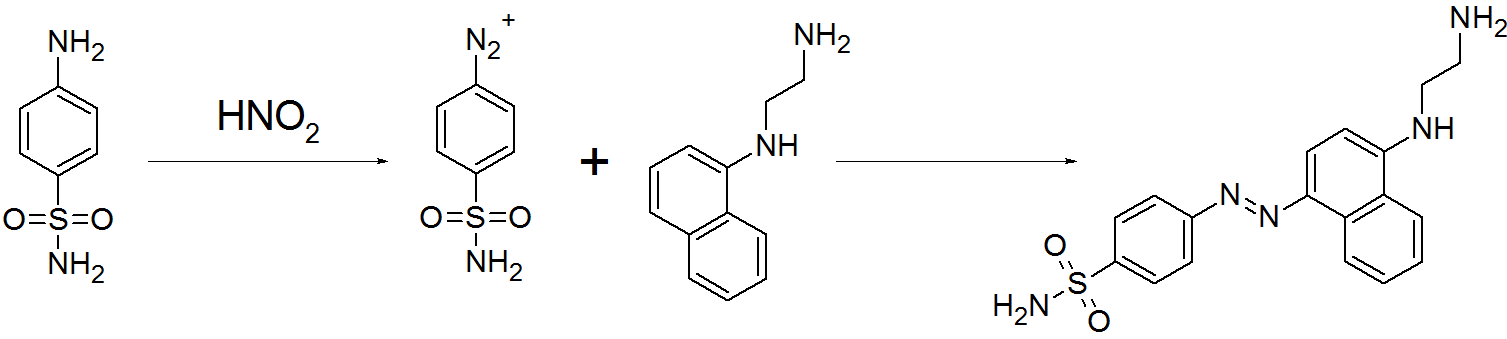

The diazo compound formed accounts for the red coloration typical for a positive result. The color intensity of the resulting solution is then measured by a colorimeter and checked against a calibration curve to determine the nitrite ion concentration.

To analyze nitrate concentrations quantitatively, the sample is first passed through a copper-cadmium column to reduce the nitrate ions quantitatively to nitrite ions, and the above procedure can be employed. However, the result should be adjusted for the nitrite ions present in the original sample.

This method can be applied in many aspects, including determining the nitrate/nitrite concentrations in sewage or other biological samples such as intracellular fluids, given that the sample is clear and colorless.

In a similar protocol, the levels of sulfonamide in blood can be detected similarly with the same principles.
