= The Woman Who Stole Vermeer =

2020 book by Anthony M. Amore

- Author: Anthony M. Amore
- Language: English
- Subject: Rose Dugdale; Russborough House; Art theft
- Genre: Biography
- Publisher: Pegasus Crime
- Publication date: 10 November 2020
- Publication place: United States
- Media type: Print, digital
- Pages: 262 pp
- ISBN: 978-1643135298
- OCLC: 1142340987
- Preceded by: The Art of the Con: The Most Notorious Fakes, Frauds, and Forgeries in the Art World

The Woman Who Stole Vermeer: The True Story of Rose Dugdale and the Russborough House Art Heist is a 2020 biography of Rose Dugdale written by Anthony M. Amore.

== Overview ==
The Woman Who Stole Vermeer explores the life of IRA militant and art thief Rose Dugale. The book delves into the story of Dugale's life as well as her involvement in the theft of a painting by Johannes Vermeer, providing insights into her motivations, methods, and the aftermath of the theft. The book is described as an exploration of the intriguing world of art theft and the complex characters involved in these daring crimes. It sheds light on the challenges faced by investigators and the allure of stolen art for thieves and collectors alike. The book provides an in-depth look at the history, art world, and criminal activities surrounding art theft, as well as the legal and ethical implications of such crimes.

The specific Vermeer painting that was stolen was Lady Writing a Letter with her Maid.

== Reception ==
The Woman Who Stole Vermeer has received mostly positive reviews from critics. The review from the New York Review of Books describes the book as a "gripping and meticulously researched true crime story," praising the author's detailed account of the heist and its aftermath, as well as the historical context provided. The Times described the book as a "fascinating tale," mentioning that the book provides insights into the motivations and personality of Rose Dugdale, while the New York Post characterized the book as a "riveting account," noting the author's detailed research. The London Review of Books review offered a more critical stance, noting that the book presents a "troubling story," but raised questions about the author's portrayal of Rose Dugdale and the historical context of the heist, and suggested that the author could have provided more nuance in his approach.
