= Chrysoine resorcinol =

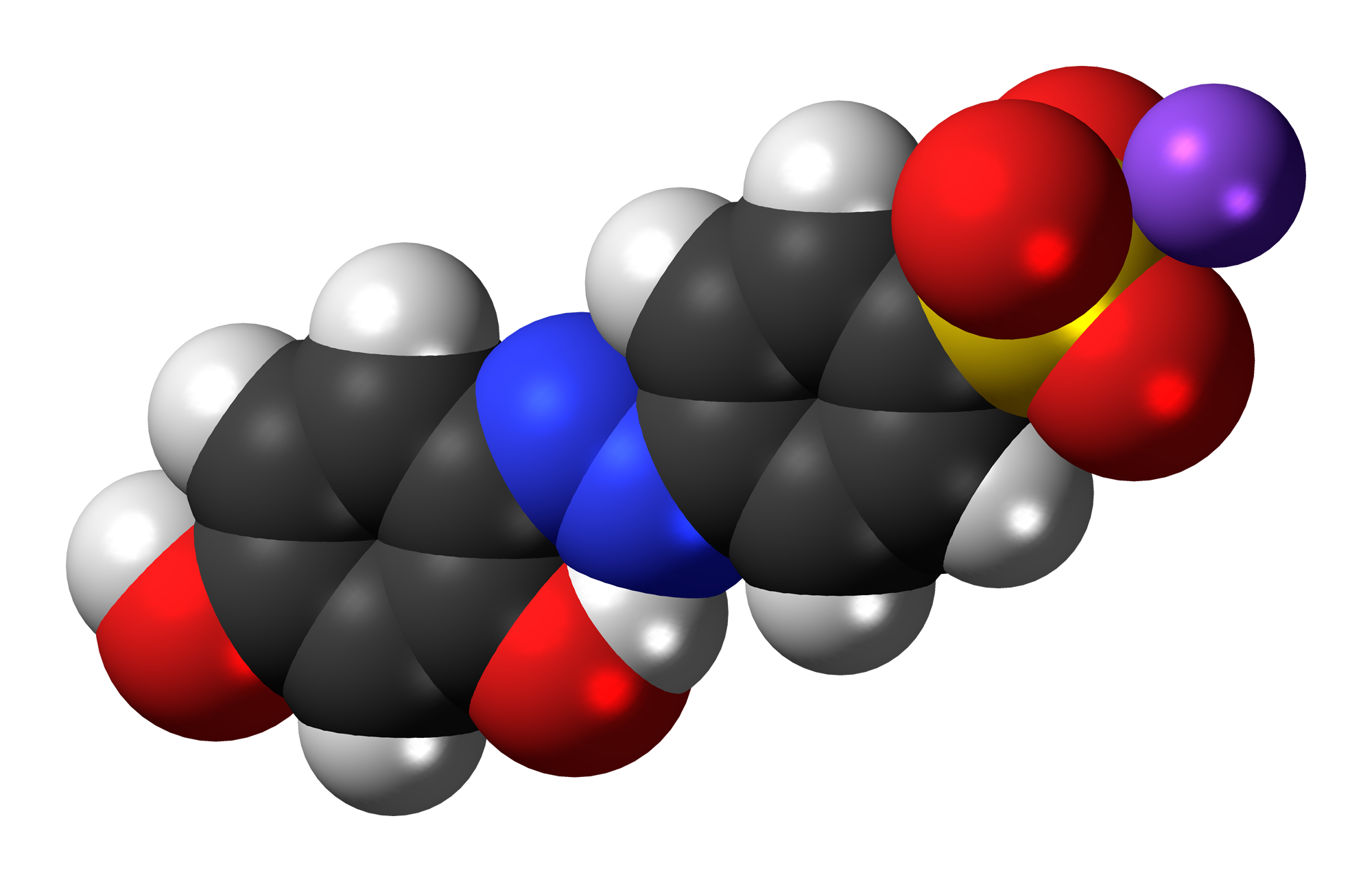

Names
- IUPAC name Sodium 4-[(2,4-dihydroxyphenyl)diazenyl]benzenesulfonate
- Other names Sodium p-(2,4-dihydroxyphenylazo)benzenesulfonate; Chrysoine; Resorcinol Yellow; Gold Yellow; Yellow T; Tropaeolin O; Tropaeolin R; C.I. Food Yellow 8; C.I. Acid Orange 6; C.I. 14270

Identifiers
CAS Number	547-57-9
3D model (JSmol)	Interactive image; Interactive image
ChemSpider	21106427
ECHA InfoCard	100.008.114
EC Number	208-924-8
PubChem CID	6093186
UNII	NF91VMI73L
CompTox Dashboard (EPA)	DTXSID70873925
- InChI: InChI=1S/C12H10N2O5S.C6H6O2.Na/c15-9-3-6-11(12(16)7-9)14-13-8-1-4-10(5-2-8)20(17,18)19;7-5-2-1-3-6(8)4-5;/h1-7,15-16H,(H,17,18,19);1-4,7-8H;/q;;+1/p-1/b14-13+;; Key: DJYSHZPRWDNEOL-QDBORUFSSA-M; InChI=1/C12H10N2O5S.Na/c15-9-3-6-11(12(16)7-9)14-13-8-1-4-10(5-2-8)20(17,18)19;/h1-7,15-16H,(H,17,18,19);/q;+1/p-1/b14-13+; Key: COEZWFYORILMOM-WTMITFMSBV; InChI=1/C12H10N2O5S.C6H6O2.Na/c15-9-3-6-11(12(16)7-9)14-13-8-1-4-10(5-2-8)20(17,18)19;7-5-2-1-3-6(8)4-5;/h1-7,15-16H,(H,17,18,19);1-4,7-8H;/q;;+1/p-1/b14-13+;; Key: DJYSHZPRWDNEOL-MNMGBGISBV
- SMILES: [Na+].Oc2cc(O)ccc2/N=N/c1ccc(cc1)S([O-])(=O)=O; [Na+].Oc2cc(O)ccc2/N=N/c1ccc(cc1)S([O-])(=O)=O.Oc1cccc(O)c1

Properties
Chemical formula	C_{12}H_{9}N_{2}NaO_{5}S
Molar mass	316.26 g·mol^{−1}
Appearance	Orange-yellow solid
Solubility in water	Partially soluble

Hazards
NFPA 704 (fire diamond)	2 1 0
- Except where otherwise noted, data are given for materials in their standard state (at 25 °C [77 °F], 100 kPa). verify (what is ?) Infobox references

Chrysoine resorcinol is a synthetic azo dye which was formerly used as a food additive. In Europe, it was banned as a food additive in 1977. In the US, it was banned in 1988.

Chrysoine resorcinol can be used as a pH indicator with a color change between pH 11 and pH 12.7. In colorimetry, it has an absorption maximum of 387 nm.

Chrysoine resorcinol (pH indicator)
below pH 11.0		above pH 12.7
11.0	⇌	12.7

== Preparation ==
Acid orange 6 can be synthesised via the azo coupling of sulfanilic acid and resorcinol,
