= Acid orange 7 =

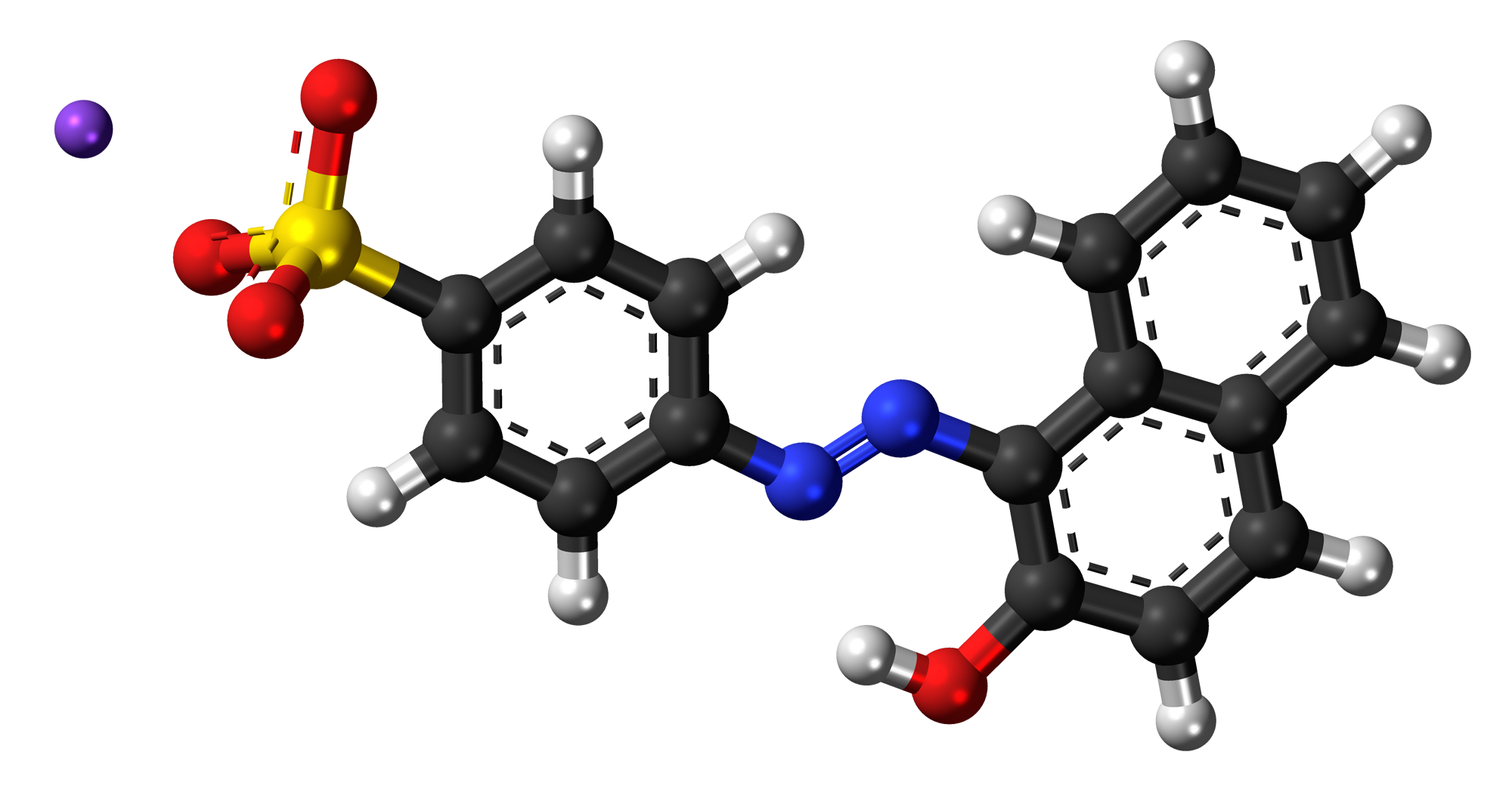

Names
- IUPAC name sodium 4-[(2E)-2-(2-oxonaphthalen-1-ylidene)hydrazinyl]benzenesulfonate
- Other names 2-naphthol orange, Orange II, CI 15510, D&C Orange 4, COLIPA C015

Identifiers
CAS Number	633-96-5
3D model (JSmol)	Interactive image
ChemSpider	21171709
ECHA InfoCard	100.010.182
PubChem CID	23682006
UNII	Q1LIY3BO0U
CompTox Dashboard (EPA)	DTXSID0038881
- InChI: InChI=1S/C16H12N2O4S.Na/c19-15-10-5-11-3-1-2-4-14(11)16(15)18-17-12-6-8-13(9-7-12)23(20,21)22;/h1-10,19H,(H,20,21,22);/q;+1/p-1 Key: CQPFMGBJSMSXLP-UHFFFAOYSA-M; InChI=1/C16H12N2O4S.Na/c19-15-10-5-11-3-1-2-4-14(11)16(15)18-17-12-6-8-13(9-7-12)23(20,21)22;/h1-10,19H,(H,20,21,22);/q;+1/p-1 Key: CQPFMGBJSMSXLP-REWHXWOFAS
- SMILES: [Na+].[O-]S(=O)(=O)c1ccc(cc1)N=Nc2c3ccccc3ccc2O

Properties
Chemical formula	C_{16}H_{11}N_{2}NaO_{4}S (sodium salt)
Molar mass	350.32 g/mol
Density	1.525 g/cm^{3}
Melting point	164 °C
- Except where otherwise noted, data are given for materials in their standard state (at 25 °C [77 °F], 100 kPa). verify (what is ?) Infobox references

Acid Orange 7, also known as 2-naphthol orange, is an azo dye. It is used for dyeing wool.

== Preparation ==
It is produced by azo coupling of β-naphthol and diazonium derivative of sulfanilic acid.

Synthesis of Acid Orange 7
