= Metanil Yellow =

Chemical dye and pH indicator

Names
- IUPAC name Sodium 3-[(4-anilinophenyl)diazenyl]benzenesulfonate
- Other names Acid Yellow 36; Acid Metanil Yellow; Monoazo

Identifiers
CAS Number	587-98-4
3D model (JSmol)	Interactive image
ChEBI	CHEBI:87235
ChemSpider	23621349
ECHA InfoCard	100.008.736
EC Number	209-608-2
PubChem CID	3935589
UNII	7SPF5O5BW8
CompTox Dashboard (EPA)	DTXSID5041722
- InChI: InChI=1S/C18H14N3O3S.Na/c22-25(23,24)18-8-4-7-17(13-18)21-20-16-11-9-15(10-12-16)19-14-5-2-1-3-6-14;/h1-13,19H,(H,22,23,24);/q;+1/p-1 Key: NYGZLYXAPMMJTE-UHFFFAOYSA-M
- SMILES: C1=CC=C(C=C1)NC2=CC=C(C=C2)N=NC3=CC(=CC=C3)S(=O)(=O)[O-].[Na+]

Properties
Chemical formula	C_{18}H_{15}N_{3}NaO_{3}S
Molar mass	376.39 g·mol^{−1}
Melting point	> 250 °C
- Except where otherwise noted, data are given for materials in their standard state (at 25 °C [77 °F], 100 kPa). Infobox references

Metanil Yellow (Acid Yellow 36) is a dye of the azo class. In analytical chemistry, it is used as a pH indicator and it has a color change from red to yellow between pH 1.2 and 3.2.

Although illegal for food use, Metanil Yellow has been used as an adulterant in turmeric- and pigeon pea-based food products, particularly in India.

Animal studies have suggested that Metanil Yellow is neurotoxic and hepatotoxic.
