= Orthanilic acid =

Names
- Preferred IUPAC name 2-Aminobenzene-1-sulfonic acid
- Other names Orthanilic acid, 2-Aminobenzenesulfonic acid o-Aminobenzenesulfonic acid Aniline-2-sulfonic acid 88-21-1; Aniline-o-sulfonic acid

Identifiers
CAS Number	88-21-1
3D model (JSmol)	Interactive image
ChEBI	CHEBI:1015
ChemSpider	6660
ECHA InfoCard	100.001.646
EC Number	201-810-9
KEGG	C06333
PubChem CID	6926
UNII	ZB9JSA4BH0
CompTox Dashboard (EPA)	DTXSID1024463
- InChI: InChI=1S/C6H7NO3S/c7-5-3-1-2-4-6(5)11(8,9)10/h1-4H,7H2,(H,8,9,10) Key: ZMCHBSMFKQYNKA-UHFFFAOYSA-N; InChI=1/C6H7NO3S/c7-5-3-1-2-4-6(5)11(8,9)10/h1-4H,7H2,(H,8,9,10) Key: ZMCHBSMFKQYNKA-UHFFFAOYAS
- SMILES: c1ccc(c(c1)N)S(=O)(=O)O

Properties
Chemical formula	C_{6}H_{7}NO_{3}S
Molar mass	173.19 g·mol^{−1}
Melting point	325 °C (decomp.)
Acidity (pK_{a})	2.46 (H_{2}O)
- Except where otherwise noted, data are given for materials in their standard state (at 25 °C [77 °F], 100 kPa). Infobox references

Orthanilic acid (2-aminobenzenesulfonic acid) is a biological acid with roles in benzoate degradation and microbial metabolism in diverse environments.

Orthanilic acid promotes reverse turn formation in peptides, inducing a folded conformation when incorporated into peptide sequences (Xaa-SAnt-Yaa), showing robust 11-membered-ring hydrogen-bonding.

Orthanilic acid is a structural component of some azo dyes which consequently have poor bacterial degradation.

Orthanilic acids have also been found to affect cardiac tension.
