= Sulfoacetaldehyde reductase =

Identifiers
- EC no.: 1.1.1.313

Databases
- IntEnz: IntEnz view
- BRENDA: BRENDA entry
- ExPASy: NiceZyme view
- KEGG: KEGG entry
- MetaCyc: metabolic pathway
- PRIAM: profile
- PDB structures: RCSB PDB PDBe PDBsum
Search
- PMC: articles
- PubMed: articles
- NCBI: proteins

Sulfoacetaldehyde reductase (EC 1.1.1.313, ISFD) is an enzyme with systematic name isethionate:NADP^{+} oxidoreductase. This enzyme catalyses the following chemical reaction

sulfoacetaldehyde
+ NADH
H^{+}
H^{+}
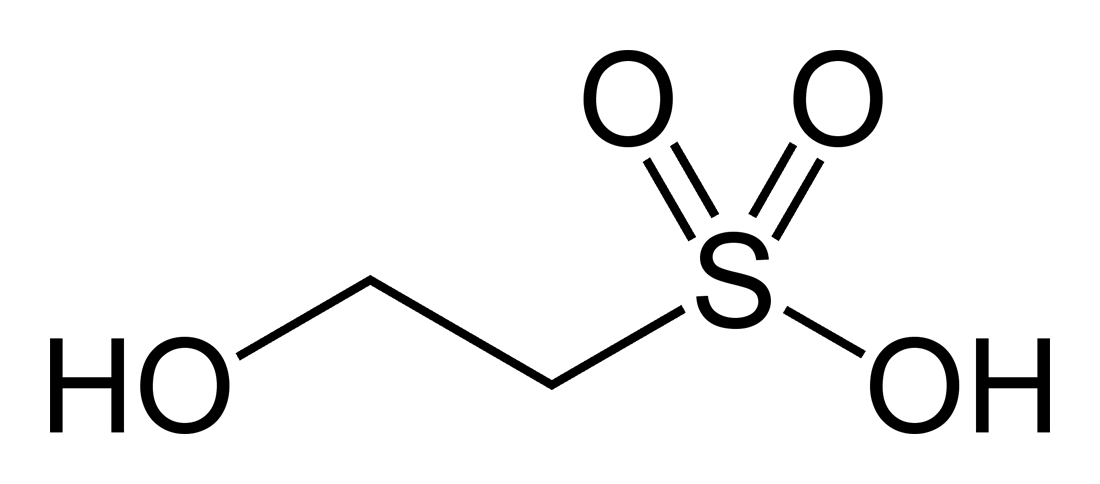
isethionic acid
+ NAD^{+}

The enzyme catalyses the reaction only in the direction in which the aldehyde is reduced.
