= 1,3-Propanedisulfonic acid =

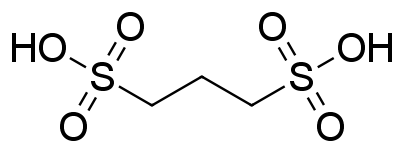

Names
- Preferred IUPAC name Propane-1,3-disulfonic acid
- Other names Eprosidate

Identifiers
CAS Number	21668-77-9
3D model (JSmol)	Interactive image
ChEMBL	ChEMBL2111092
ChemSpider	379112
ECHA InfoCard	100.204.148
PubChem CID	428573
UNII	6QFP76V7S7
CompTox Dashboard (EPA)	DTXSID4048301
- InChI: InChI=1S/C3H8O6S2/c4-10(5,6)2-1-3-11(7,8)9/h1-3H2,(H,4,5,6)(H,7,8,9) Key: MGNVWUDMMXZUDI-UHFFFAOYSA-N
- SMILES: C(CS(=O)(=O)O)CS(=O)(=O)O

Properties
Chemical formula	C_{3}H_{8}O_{6}S_{2}
Molar mass	204.21 g·mol^{−1}
Melting point	120–125 °C (248–257 °F; 393–398 K)
Boiling point	157 °C (315 °F; 430 K)

Hazards
- GHS labelling
Pictograms	(GHS05: Corrosive) (GHS07: Exclamation mark)
Signal word	Danger
Hazard statements	H302, H312, H314, H332
Precautionary statements	P260, P264, P270, P271, P280, P301+P312, P301+P330+P331, P302+P352, P303+P361+P353, P304+P312, P304+P340, P305+P351+P338, P310, P312, P321, P322, P330, P363, P405, P501
- Except where otherwise noted, data are given for materials in their standard state (at 25 °C [77 °F], 100 kPa). Infobox references

1,3-Propanedisulfonic acid is a sulfonic acid containing two sulfonate units. Its salts are called eprodisates and have been evaluated as a protector of renal function in AA amyloidosis.

== See also ==
- Methanedisulfonic acid
- Ethanedisulfonic acid
