= C2H6O4S =

The molecular formula C_{2}H_{6}O_{4}S (molar mass: 126.13 g/mol, exact mass: 125.9987 u) may refer to:

- Ethyl sulfate, also known as sulfovinic acid
- Isethionic acid
- Dimethyl sulfate (DMS)
