= Polystyrene (drug delivery) =

Polystyrene in drug delivery

Skeletal structure of polystyrene

Polystyrene is a synthetic hydrocarbon polymer that is widely adaptive and can be used for a variety of purposes in drug delivery. These methods include polystyrene microspheres, nanoparticles, and solid foams. In the biomedical engineering field, these methods assist researchers in drug delivery, diagnostics, and imaging strategies.

A common group of medication that utilizes a combination of polystyrene and sulfonate functional groups are polystyrene sulfonates. This medication is primarily used to treat hyperkalemia, a condition that results from an increased blood potassium level. FDA approved equivalents of polystyrene sulfonates are KIONEX, KALEXATE, and SPS. While these are the only current FDA approved drug that utilizes polystyrene, polystyrene sees a number of applications in other pharmacological contexts with nanoparticles and microspheres.

== Drug Delivery Applications ==
=== Solid foams ===
Polystyrene integrated solid foams are not commonly used in biomedical applications but have shown promise as a new drug delivery vehicle. The manipulation of the porous foam networks is a fundamental component in solid foam dosing – affecting variables such as dissolution, adsorption, and drug diffusion. Solid foam structures are particularly attractive due to the predictability in drug release profiles through the highly tunable porosity and high surface area of these foams.

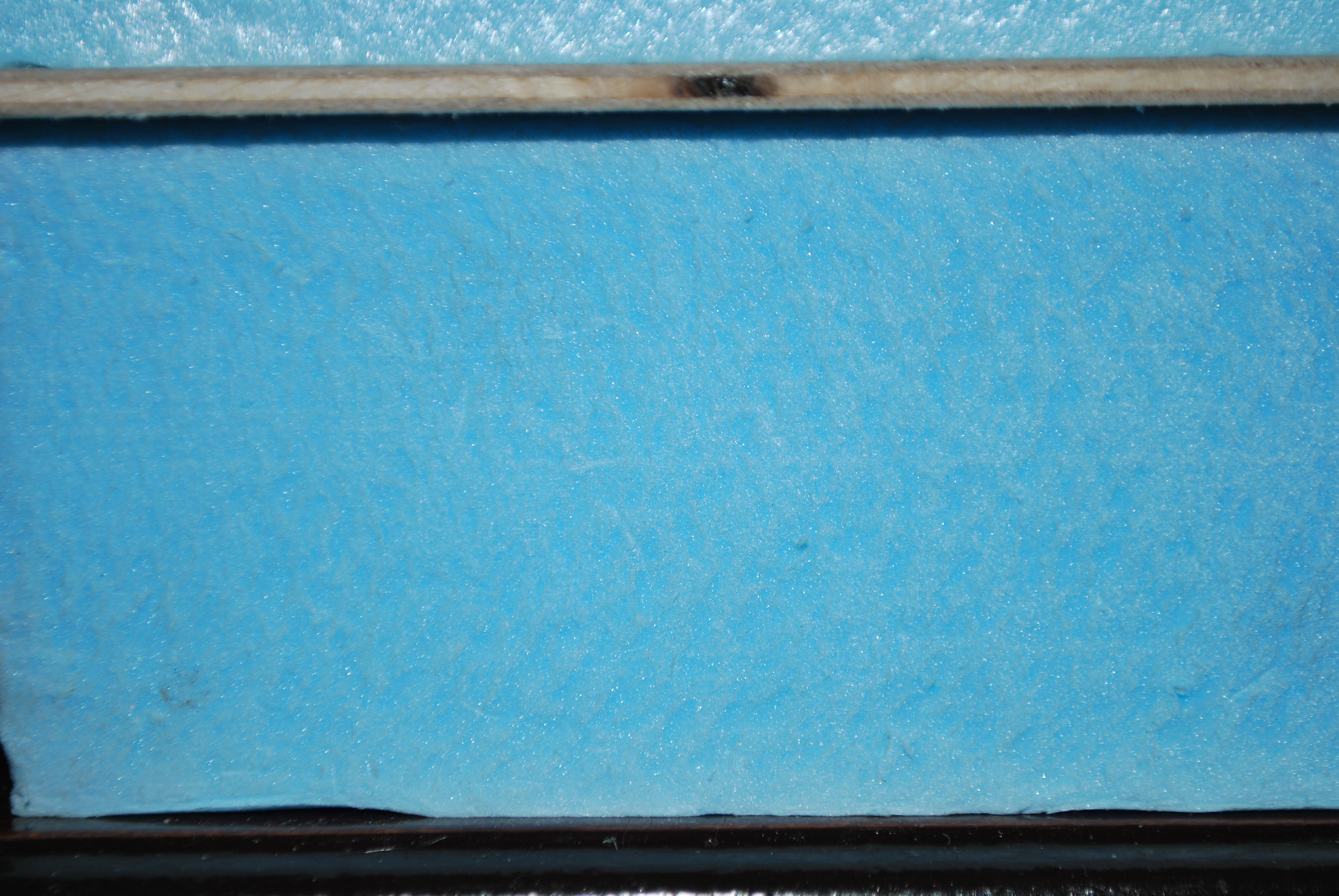
Blue expanded polystyrene solid foam

The process of creating these structures is typically complex, requiring multiple step processes in order to synthesis a foam of desired properties. However, polystyrene solid foams have been created through simpler methods such as extrusion from a blowing agent or polystyrene bead expansion. While these methods are typically utilized for insulation or similar industry uses, this production method has also seen use in drug delivery applications [5]. Polystyrene solid foams can also be produced through emulsions. An emulsion can be created through the combination of two immiscible liquids. While many methods are used to create emulsion, Canal et al. used a unique method known as phase inversion temperature (PIT). PIT utilizes phase transitions to produce highly concentrated amounts of emulsion quickly. Through changes in temperature, solubility, and low interfacial tension, PIT is able to efficiently promote emulsion. The porosity of these solid foams is able to be fine-tuned, showing promise for osteogenic and therapeutic applications. For example, proposed osteogenic applications include the promotion of bone integration. The study conducted by Canal et al., utilized polystyrene solid foams as a drug delivery method to evaluate the drug release profile of ketoprofen. Researchers have stated that understanding the release profile for various drugs with polystyrene solid foams could significantly improve treatment outcomes for many disease states.

=== Nanoparticles ===
Nanoparticles have been used in drug delivery for applications such as diagnosis and treatment of diseases, with polymeric nanoparticles gaining significant traction as a carrier of drugs or biomolecules over the last few decades. These structures are extremely small, having a diameter < 100 nm. The high surface to volume ratio allows nanoparticles to display properties that are different than their bulk material in biological systems. These properties have been the sole reason of their use in physiological environments. While the structure of nanoparticles is straightforward, the efficacy of nanoparticles is affected by variables such as size and surface modifications which determines their overall biocompatibility and biological interaction.

==== Size and Nanoparticle Internalization ====
Polystyrene nanoparticles are the model nanoparticle used for drug delivery applications because they are easy to synthesize in varying sizes. Size is an important factor in cellular uptake rates, which is important for specific pathways such as the endocytic pathway. In a study conducted by Rejman et al., researchers were able to show that polystyrene nanoparticles with diameters of 50 nm and 100 nm were internalized faster than nanoparticles with diameters of 200 nm and 500 nm. Internalization is vital in understanding the impact the designed nanoparticles are having on the target cells. Nanoparticle internalization depends on a couple of key factors such as nanoparticle size, cell type, and time. Nanoparticles of larger size are typically internalized through processes such as phagocytosis or micropinocytosis. Smaller nanoparticles are typically internalized through processes such as macro-pinocytosis, phagocytosis, clathrin-mediated endocytosis, caveolae-mediated endocytosis, and clathrin-and caveolae-independent pathways. The diversity in pathways is one of the greatest challenges with utilizing these nanoparticles since a case-by-case approach is typically required to maximize the entry pathways. To measure nanoparticle internalization, techniques such as fluorescence activated cell sorting/scanning (FACS), inductively coupled plasma (ICP) mass spectroscopy, confocal laser scanning microscopy (CLSM), and imaging flow cytometry (IFC) are utilized, each offering their own advantages and disadvantages.

==== Biocompatibility and Biological Integration ====
The main advantage of polystyrene nanoparticles is their biocompatibility, which allows them to be used broadly for biomedical devices and the study of bio-nano interactions. Furthermore, their ability to not degrade in cellular environments proves to be an asset in biomedical applications. A unique property of polystyrene nanoparticles, like some other polymers, is their ability to fuse with proteins. When proteins bind to the surface of the nanoparticle, a protein corona is formed. A protein corona encapsulates the identity of the nanoparticle, and the properties of the corona can be manipulated based on the physical properties of the nanoparticle. The corona can be defined as “soft” or “hard” depending on bonding strength and surface-bound protein exchange rate. As such, a soft protein corona is defined by nanoparticles that are loosely bound and proteins that are easily exchangeable. In contrast, a hard protein corona has nanoparticles that are tightly bound and proteins that are not as easily exchangeable. These kinetics are vital in understanding how nanoparticles will respond in biological fluid. The hardness of the protein corona plays a role in the Vroman effect, a principle that describes how proteins with higher affinities replace proteins of lower affinity [8], [11]. The Vroman effect is influenced by protein concentration relative to the surface area and diffusion coefficients. Overall, this affects the protein surface binding affinity. For example, Ehrenburg et al. have shown that fibrinogen presence rapidly declines with polystyrene nanoparticles containing functional groups, such as COOH and CH_{3}. This allows a protein such as albumin, with a lower affinity, to adsorb and become replaced by fibrinogen. Overall, polymeric nanoparticles that can fuse with proteins have a significant advantage over other polymeric nanoparticles due to this versatility in biological interaction.

==== Surface Modifications ====
Certain properties of polystyrene nanoparticles can be modified depending on the scenario. For instance, the surface of polystyrene nanoparticles can be manipulated by surface oxidation, which creates a surface that is highly receptive with cell cultures. These surface-level modifications also express a lower polydispersity index and can create stable colloids in biological liquid. Similarly, the surface of these nanoparticles can be treated with ethylene oxide or UV irradiation for sterilization purposes. Due to the emphasis on biocompatibility, Loos et al. have utilized polystyrene nanoparticles as a model to analyze how different surface properties affect biomedical variables. Overall, it was determined that a strong understanding of surface properties is vital to manipulate parameters such as pharmacokinetics, biocompatibility, and tissue and cell affinity. In a study conducted by Lundqvist et al., the protein corona was studied with three surface modified polystyrene (plain, carboxyl-modified, and amine-modified) nanoparticles of two different sizes (50 nm and 100 nm). This study ultimately showed that surface corona properties are also affected by size and surface composition.

==== Current Applications ====
Polystyrene nanoparticles have been used in various applications such as cancer treatment. The primary issue associated with treating cancer is that many chemotherapies suffer from poor penetration into tumor cells. In a study conducted by Larina et al., researchers utilized polystyrene nanoparticles in conjunction with ultrasound radiation to influence tumor regression. They proposed a method of utilizing ultrasound-induced cavitation to enhance drug delivery to cancer cells. Nanoparticles have typically been used in these applications because they are able to accumulate in these tumor sites actively or passively. For this application, since cavitation is an important factor, polystyrene nanoparticles were used since their presence allows cavitation to occur at lower pressure intensities. Within mice models, their study found that ultrasound irradiation and polystyrene nanoparticles with a combination of 5-FU injections showed strong levels of tumor inhibition and total tumor regression.

The effect of polystyrene nanoparticles on various cell lines have also been researched. Application with human gastric adenocarcinoma cell (AGS) lines has been studied due to these cells being the first line of contact with nanoparticles from ingestion. The goal of the study by Forte et al. was a further understanding of nanoparticle interaction with biological systems by studying the kinetic uptake of polystyrene nanoparticle uptake by AGS cells. Just as previous studies have shown, it was concluded that the primary factors that influence drug delivery strategies are the size and concentration of these nanoparticles.

Polystyrene nanoparticle composites have also been the focus of literature due to their adaptability. Composites are useful since the properties for the constituent materials can be combined in a way that is unlike the original components. This is extremely relevant in drug delivery applications to fine tune specific parameters case-by-case. In a study conducted by Lim et al., a composite of mono-disperse Fe_{3}O_{4} and polystyrene nanoparticles were utilized for cardiac myocyte treatment via magnetic targeting. Other polystyrene composites have been created with silica nanoparticles. These materials are attractive for a number of reasons such as having low toxicity, being able to control its particle size, strong chemical and thermal stability, biocompatibility, and degradability in physiological environments. Since many of these properties are already present in polystyrene nanoparticles (i.e., biocompatibility and particle size), these structures only enhance its effect in biological environments. As a result, composites such as these have seen increased use a mode of drug delivery.

=== Microspheres ===
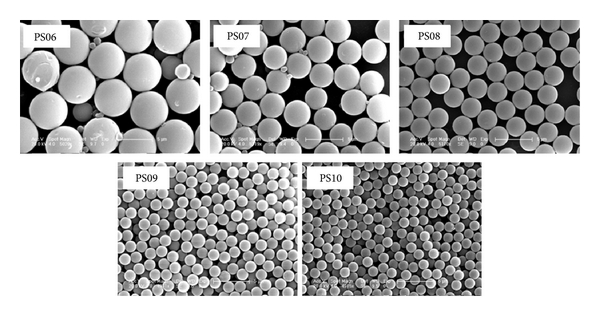
SEM images of polystyrene microspheres

Microspheres (or microparticles) are a group of small spherical particles that typically have a diameter ranging from 1 μm to 1000 μm. While microspheres can be created through natural or synthetic purposes, synthetic polymer microspheres offer useful advantages over other options. The most common types of polymeric microspheres are polyethylene and polystyrene; however, polystyrene microspheres are especially useful in biomedical applications because they are able to actively facilitate cell sorting and immunoprecipitation. This results in proteins and ligands adsorbing readily, similar to polystyrene nanoparticles. Polystyrene microparticles are also hydrophobic meaning that they will not swell when exposed to a biological environment. Microspheres are applicable with a myriad of drug delivery applications (e.g., ophthalmic, gene, intra-tumoral, local, oral, nasal, gastrointestinal, peroral, vaginal, transdermal, and colonic drug delivery). Polystyrene microspheres have also seen use in magnetic and radiolabeled microspheres. Similarly, model microspheres such as carboxylated polystyrene microspheres have been used for many studies due to high ligand conjugation through carbodiimide chemistry.

==== Microsphere Synthesis ====
The way that microspheres are prepared can influence their physical properties. Preparation methods such as precipitation polymerization, seed polymerization, microemulsion, and dispersion polymerization have been used in the past to create polystyrene microspheres. Precipitation polymerization is a robust method of polymer synthesis where a monomer and initiator are dissolved in a solvent. This method is advantageous due to low viscosities, clean surfaces, low solid content, and irregular geometries, factors which are beneficial in physiological environments. Seed polymerization is a preparation method used to create core-shell emulsions. These structures have good stability and narrow particle size distribution, however, due to a long and complex preparation process there is a high likelihood of monomers becoming embedded inside the particles. Microemulsions are a method of creating emulsions through an emulsifier. By creating particles with microbubbles, this method can create particles that have similar particle size and stability. Dispersion polymerization is a method of creating particles with similar size with the advantage of being easy to perform and operate. With this method, particle size can easily be modified by manipulating the concentrations of stabilizer, co-monomer, and water. Due to these reasons, dispersion polymerization has become one of the primary methods of polystyrene microsphere synthesis. Each of these methods offer their own advantages and disadvantages and are chosen for microsphere synthesis accordingly.

==== Current Applications ====
Polystyrene microspheres have previously been used for serological tests (i.e., rheumatoid arthritis, disseminated lupus erythematous, and pregnancy tests). Saravanan et al. have shown that polystyrene microspheres can be used for controlled drug delivery applications with ibuprofen. One of the biggest limitations associated with drug delivery is that intravenously injected drug carriers (e.g., microspheres and liposomes) become trapped by mononuclear phagocyte system (MGS) cells. This limitation is important to overcome for the progression of treatment outcomes for diseases such as AIDS and tuberculosis which primarily rely on the macrophage response system. A study by Makino et al. delved into the required size and surface modifications required for alveolar macrophages to uptake polystyrene microspheres. It was shown that microspheres with a softer surface were more accessible to alveolar macrophages. Moreover, primary amine groups were also shown to be more effective over carboxyl groups. As a result, polystyrene microspheres have seen increased use a mode of drug delivery.

== Polystyrene Toxicity ==
One of the most important factors to consider is the toxicity of the polystyrene particles. Many in vitro studies have been conducted to understand how these structures can affect reactive oxygen species generation and cell viability. Overall, these studies showed that polystyrene nanoparticles did not affect cell viability.

Similarly, it is important to consider polystyrene toxicity in human models. The use of polystyrene has been under scrutiny by various international and local agencies due to the effects of polystyrene on the environment. As a result, there has always been a cause for concern for how polystyrene can affect human health. The Environmental Protection Agency (EPA) and studies conducted by Mutti et al. claim that the chronic toxicity of styrene is 300ppm (1,000 μg/m^{3}). Within the polymer industry, these levels typically don't go over 20ppm. Furthermore, the FDA reports that the admissible daily intake (ADI) is 90,000 μg/person/day.
