= Clomethiazole =

Sedative/Hypnotic medication for alcohol withdrawal

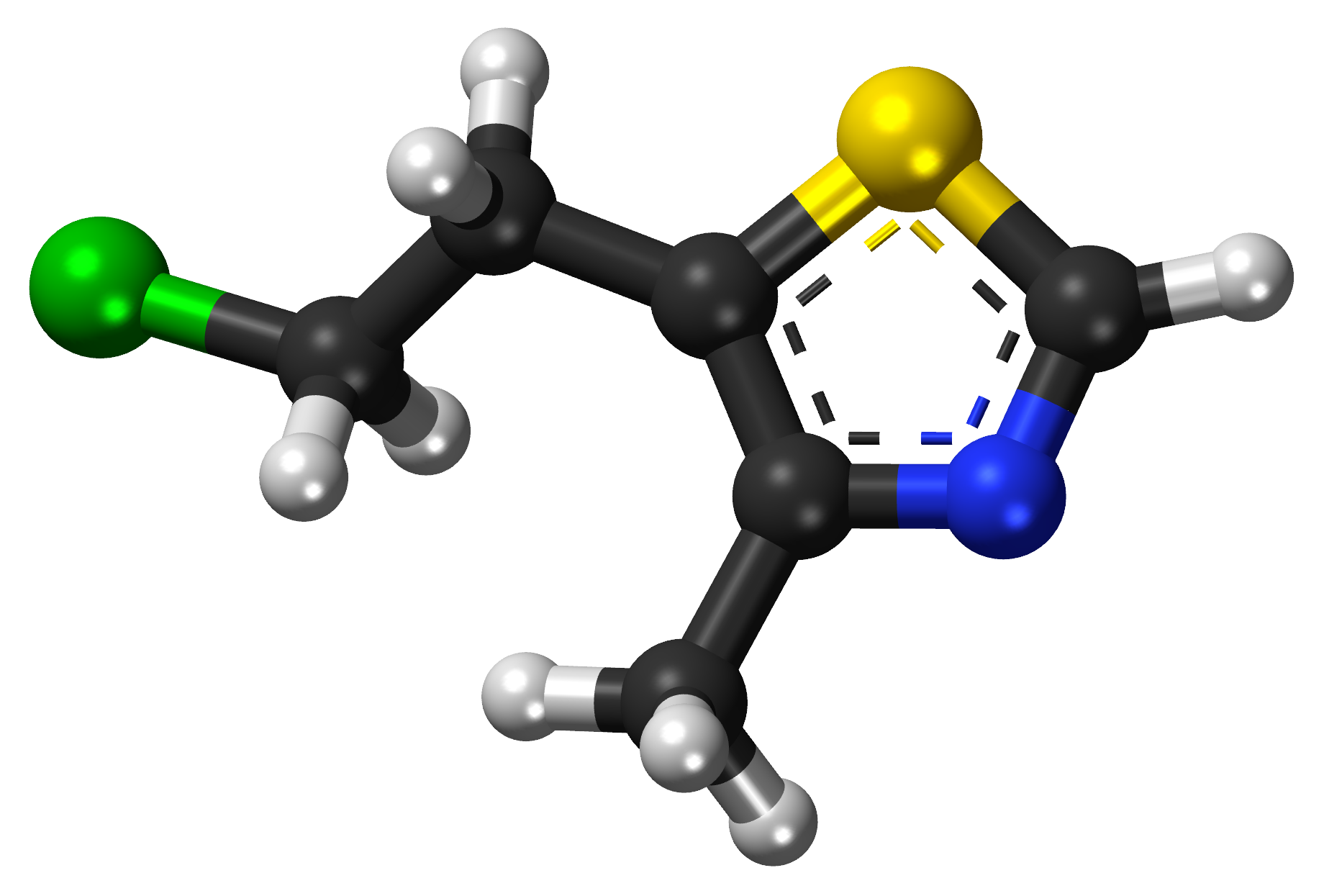

Clinical data
- AHFS/Drugs.com: International Drug Names
- Routes of administration: Oral
- ATC code: N05CM02 (WHO)

Legal status
- Legal status: BR: Class C1 (Other controlled substances); UK: POM (Prescription only); US: ℞-only; In general: ℞ (Prescription only)

Pharmacokinetic data
- Elimination half-life: 3.6–5 hours

Identifiers
- IUPAC name: 5-(2-Chloroethyl)-4-methyl-1,3-thiazole
- CAS Number: 533-45-9
- PubChem CID: 10783
- ChemSpider: 10327
- UNII: 0C5DBZ19HV
- KEGG: D07330
- ChEMBL: ChEMBL315795
- CompTox Dashboard (EPA): DTXSID6022842
- ECHA InfoCard: 100.007.788

Chemical and physical data
- Formula: C_{6}H_{8}ClNS
- Molar mass: 161.65 g·mol^{−1}
- 3D model (JSmol): Interactive image
- SMILES: ClCCC1=C(C)N=CS1
- InChI: InChI=1S/C6H8ClNS/c1-5-6(2-3-7)9-4-8-5/h4H,2-3H2,1H3; Key:PCLITLDOTJTVDJ-UHFFFAOYSA-N

Clomethiazole (also called chlormethiazole) is a sedative and hypnotic originally developed by Hoffmann-La Roche in the 1930s. The drug is typically used in treating and preventing symptoms of acute alcohol withdrawal, anxiety and as a sedative-hypnotic.

It is structurally related to thiamine (vitamin B_{1}), but acts like a sedative, hypnotic, anxiolytic, muscle relaxant and anticonvulsant, having the same mechanism of action as traditional barbiturates. It is also used for the management of agitation, restlessness, and Parkinson's disease. In the UK, it is sold under the brand Heminevrin (AstraZeneca Pharmaceuticals). Other brand names include Nevrin in Romania, Distraneurin in Germany and Distraneurine in Spain. The drug is marketed either as a free base in an oily solution containing 192 mg in capsule form, or as clomethiazole edisylate syrup. Due to its high toxicity compared to benzodiazepines it is not recommended as a first-line treatment for any indication and is particularly dangerous to patients with an elevated risk for drug abuse such as those with a personal or familial history of addiction.

== Pharmacology ==
Clomethiazole acts as a positive allosteric modulator at the barbiturate/picrotoxin site of the GABA_{A} receptor. It works to enhance the action of the neurotransmitter GABA at this receptor. GABA is the major inhibitory neurotransmitter in the brain and produces anxiolytic, anticonvulsant, sedative, and hypnotic effects. Clomethiazole appears to also have another mechanism of action mediating some of its hypothermic and neuroprotective effects. The oxazole homologue is also known providing a little QSAR information.

As opposed to barbiturates, clomethiazole doesn't affect the electrophysiological responses to excitatory aminoacids, and additionally, it also directly acts on chloride ion channels.

Clomethiazole is a potent CYP2E1 enzyme inhibitor which slows down the metabolism of ethanol, hence its use in alcohol withdrawal. It is also an inhibitor of CYP2B6 and possibly CYP2A6 and thus can affect the plasma clearance of substrates of those enzymes.

When clomethiazole is administered via IV in addition to carbamazepine, its clearance is increased by 30%, which results in a proportional reduction in plasma concentration. Therefore, when co-administered with carbamazepine or other potent CYP3A4 inducers via IV, it is necessary to increase the dose of clomethiazole.

== Adverse effects ==
Long term and frequent use of clomethiazole can cause tolerance and physical dependence. Abrupt withdrawal may result in symptoms similar to those of sudden withdrawal of alcohol, short-acting barbiturates or short-acting benzodiazepines.

== Overdose ==
Clomethiazole is particularly toxic and dangerous if overdosed and is potentially fatal. Alcohol multiplies the effect. As the drug can be fatal in high doses, prescribing clomethiazole for the management of alcohol dependence outside of a controlled environment, for example a hospital, is not recommended, especially because there are much less toxic alternatives, such as diazepam. Diazepam is one of many drugs belonging to the benzodiazepine class, with a long half-life (50–100 hours) and a very low risk of a fatal overdose, so long as the patient does not also consume alcohol or certain other types of medication.

Due to clomethiazole's unique chemical structure the benzodiazepine antidote flumazenil cannot reverse the effects of overdose; overdose treatment is restricted to the application of a mechanical ventilation apparatus until enough of the drug has been metabolized or excreted for the patient to breathe sufficiently without assistance.

Drummer Keith Moon of the rock band The Who died of a clomethiazole overdose.

== See also ==
- Drug of last resort
- Therapeutic index
