= Sodium 2-hydroxyethyl sulfonate =

Names
- Preferred IUPAC name Sodium 2-hydroxyethane-1-sulfonate

Identifiers
CAS Number	1562-00-1
3D model (JSmol)	Interactive image
ChemSpider	14540
ECHA InfoCard	100.014.858
PubChem CID	15275
UNII	3R36J71C17
CompTox Dashboard (EPA)	DTXSID7027413
- InChI: InChI=1S/C2H6O4S.Na/c3-1-2-7(4,5)6;/h3H,1-2H2,(H,4,5,6);/q;+1/p-1 Key: LADXKQRVAFSPTR-UHFFFAOYSA-M
- SMILES: C(CS(=O)(=O)[O-])O.[Na+]

Properties
Melting point	191 to 194 °C (376 to 381 °F; 464 to 467 K)
- Except where otherwise noted, data are given for materials in their standard state (at 25 °C [77 °F], 100 kPa). Infobox references

Sodium 2-hydroxyethyl sulfonate (also: sodium isethionate) is the sodium salt of 2-hydroxyethane sulfonic acid (isethionic acid), it is used as a hydrophilic head group in washing-active surfactants, known as isethionates (acyloxyethanesulfonates) due to its strong polarity and resistance to multivalent ions. It is being studied as a high production volume chemical in the "High Production Volume (HPV) Chemical Challenge Program" of the US Environmental Protection Agency (EPA).

== Production ==
Sodium 2-hydroxyethyl sulfonate is formed by the reaction of ethylene oxide with sodium hydrogen sulfite in aqueous solution:

To avoid contamination and suppress the formation of by-products (which are difficult to remove) the reaction must be performed under careful control of mass ratios and process conditions. Excess sulfite (SO_{3}^{2−}) or bisulfite (HSO_{3}^{−}) lead to an unpleasant odor of the downstream product, higher levels of ethylene glycol or glycol ethers (formed by the hydrolysis and ethoxylation of ethylene oxide) give hygroscopic and greasy surfactants. Concentrated ethylene glycol-containing sodium 2-hydroxyethyl sulfonate solutions can subsequently mostly be freed from ethylene glycol by continuous extraction with e.g. isopropanol (<0.5%). Therefore, in the continuous industrial process an aqueous sodium hydrogen sulfite solution is prepared in a first reactor by mixing a sodium hydroxide solution and sulfur dioxide. In a second reactor the sodium hydrogen sulfite solution is mixed with a slight excess of ethylene oxide to obtain sodium 2-hydroxyethyl sulfonate in almost quantitative yields at elevated temperature and pressure with a precise control of pH. The reaction has to take place under the exclusion of oxygen and under precise control of the stoichiometry of the reactants, the temperature, the pH and the throughput.

== Properties ==
Solid sodium 2-hydroxyethyl sulfonate is a colorless, free-flowing, non-hygroscopic solid, which dissolves readily in water and has good biodegradability. Due to the method of synthesis samples often contain traces of sodium sulfite or sodium hydrogen sulfite causing aqueous solution to possesses a mildly alkaline pH of about 10.

== Use ==
The main use of sodium 2-hydroxyethyl sulfonate is the production of the isethionate class of surfactants. These are readily foaming and particularly mild, making them suitable for cleaning sensitive skin and are therefore mainly used in baby soaps and shampoos. Because of its pronounced skin compatibility sodium 2-hydroxyethyl sulfonate is added to soaps and liquid skin cleansers with up to 15 parts by weight.

From sodium 2-hydroxyethyl sulfonate the so-called biological buffers such as HEPES, MES, PIPES etc. are easily accessible.

The addition of 2-hydroxyethyl sulfonate to electroplating baths allows higher current densities and lower concentrations than the much more expensive methane sulphonic acid with improved appearance.
