= C3H9NO3S =

The molecular formula C_{3}H_{9}NO_{3}S (molar mass: 139.173 g/mol, exact mass: 139.0303 u) may refer to:

- Homotaurine
- N-Methyltaurine
