= Carbyl sulfate =

Chemical compound

Names
- Preferred IUPAC name 1,3,2λ^{6},4λ^{6}-Dioxadithiane-2,2,4,4-tetrone

Identifiers
CAS Number	503-41-3
3D model (JSmol)	Interactive image
ChemSpider	61459
ECHA InfoCard	100.007.244
PubChem CID	68151
UNII	HSJ374FH79
CompTox Dashboard (EPA)	DTXSID8060119
- InChI: InChI=1S/C2H4O6S2/c3-9(4)2-1-7-10(5,6)8-9/h1-2H2 Key: VSANMHWDSONVEE-UHFFFAOYSA-N; InChI=1/C2H4O6S2/c3-9(4)2-1-7-10(5,6)8-9/h1-2H2 Key: VSANMHWDSONVEE-UHFFFAOYAN
- SMILES: O=S1(=O)OS(=O)(=O)OCC1

Properties
Chemical formula	C_{2}H_{4}O_{6}S_{2}
Molar mass	188.17 g·mol^{−1}
Appearance	White solid
Melting point	107.5–109 °C (225.5–228.2 °F; 380.6–382.1 K)
- Except where otherwise noted, data are given for materials in their standard state (at 25 °C [77 °F], 100 kPa). Infobox references

Carbyl sulfate is an organosulfur compound. The white solid is the product of the reaction of sulfur trioxide and ethylene. It is used in preparation of some dyes and other organosulfur compounds. Carbyl sulfate is a colorless, crystalline, hygroscopic substance although commercial product can appear as a liquid. Because of its unpleasant properties carbyl sulfate is difficult to handle and is usually not isolated but further processed to give secondary products.

== Production ==
Regnault and Heinrich Gustav Magnus reported first in the years 1838 to 1839 on the compound as reaction product of anhydrous ethanol and anhydrous sulfuric acid.

Carbyl sulfate is produced in the highly exothermic (about 800 kcal/kg) reaction of ethylene and sulfur trioxide in the vapor phase in nearly quantitative yield.

Disulfuric acid and chlorosulfuric acid can also be used as a sulfonating agent, replacing sulfur trioxide. Instead of ethylene, ethylene-forming agents can be used, such as ethanol or diethyl ether.

The product of industrial processes is a water-clear liquid which has – in accordance with D.S. Breslow (107.5–109 °C) – a melting range from 102–108 °C. Previously stated melting point of about 80 °C results from adhering sulfur trioxide.

== Reactions and use ==
As a cyclic sulfate ester, it is an alkylating agent. Hydrolysis affords ethionic acid, which retains one sulfate ester group. Ethionic acid undergoes further hydrolysis to isethionic acid:

Carbyl sulfate is used as precursor for vinylsulfonic acid and sodium vinyl sulfonate, which are important activated alkenes and are used as anionic comonomers. A number of functional compounds with a variety of applications are available by nucleophilic addition at the activated double bond of the vinyl sulfonic acid and its derivatives.

== Safety ==
The material is highly reactive. It can decompose explosively when heated above 170 °C.
