= Dispersion polymerization =

Precipitation reaction among monomers dissolved in solution

IUPAC definition

Dispersion polymerization: Precipitation polymerization in which monomer(s),
initiator(s), and colloid stabilizer(s) are dissolved in a solvent forming initially
a homogeneous system that produces polymer and results in the formation of
polymer particles.

Note: The process usually results in polymer particles of colloidal dimensions.

In polymer science, dispersion polymerization is a heterogeneous polymerization process carried out in the presence of a polymeric stabilizer in the reaction medium. Dispersion polymerization is a type of precipitation polymerization, meaning the solvent selected as the reaction medium is a good solvent for the monomer and the initiator, but is a non-solvent for the polymer. As the polymerization reaction proceeds, particles of polymer form, creating a non-homogeneous solution. In dispersion polymerization these particles are the locus of polymerization, with monomer being added to the particle throughout the reaction. In this sense, the mechanism for polymer formation and growth has features similar to that of emulsion polymerization. With typical precipitation polymerization, the continuous phase (the solvent solution) is the main locus of polymerization, which is the main difference between precipitation and dispersion.

== Polymerization mechanism ==
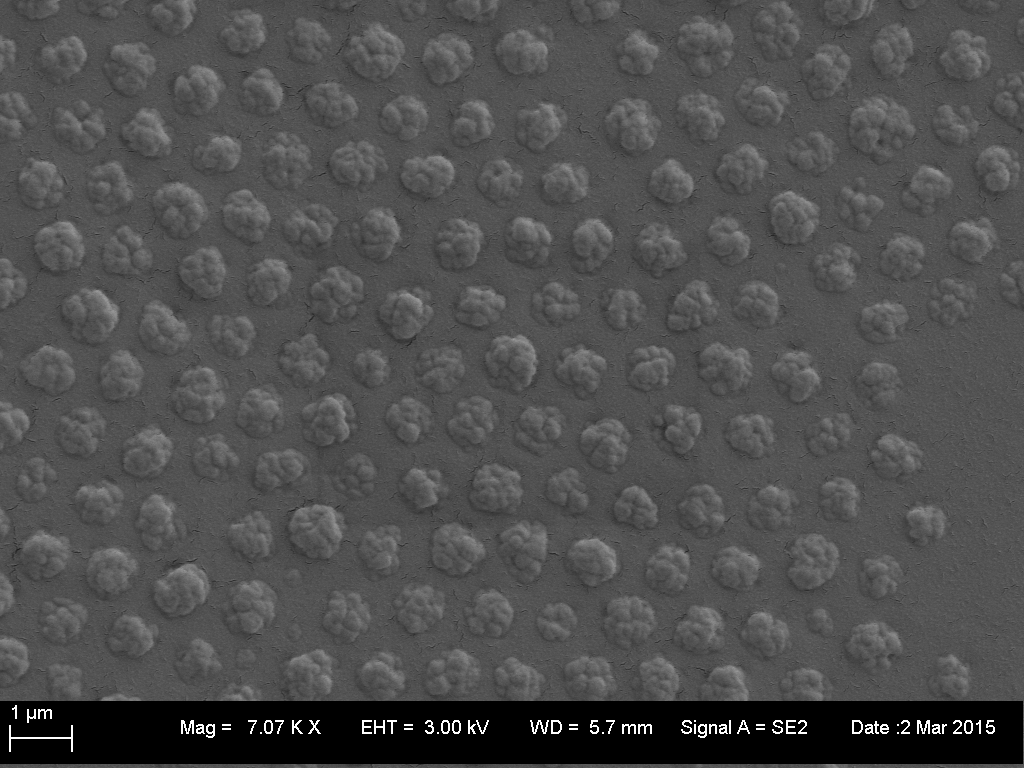
SEM-Picture of PMMA-particles fabricated by dispersion polymerization after drying / removal of the organic liquid phase (cyclohexane)

At the onset of polymerization, polymers remain in solution until they reach a critical molecular weight (MW), at which point they precipitate. These initial polymer particles are unstable and coagulate with other particles until stabilized particles form. After this point in the polymerization, growth only occurs by addition of monomer to the stabilized particles. As the polymer particles grow, stabilizer (or dispersant) molecules attach covalently to the surface. These stabilizer molecules are generally graft or block copolymers, and can be preformed or can form in situ during the reaction. Typically, one side of the stabilizer copolymer has an affinity for the solvent while the other side has an affinity for the polymer particle being formed. These molecules play a crucial role in dispersion polymerization by forming a “hairy layer” around the particles that prevents particle coagulation. This controls size and colloidal stability of the particles in the reaction system. The driving force for the particle separation is steric hindrance between the outward-facing tails of the stabilizer layers.

Dispersion polymerization can produce nearly monodisperse polymer particles of 0.1–15 micrometers (μm). This is important because it fills the gap between particle size generated by conventional emulsion polymerization (0.006–0.7 μm) in batch process and that of suspension polymerization (50–1000 μm).

== Applications ==
Particles produced by dispersion polymerization are used in a wide variety of applications. Toners, instrument calibration standards, chromatography column packing materials, liquid crystal display spacers, and biomedical and biochemical analysis all use these micron-size monodisperse particles, particles which were hard to come by before the development of dispersion polymerization methods. The dispersions are also used as surface coatings. Unlike solution coatings, dispersion coatings have viscosities that are independent of polymer MW. The viscosities of dispersions are advantageously lower than those of solutions with practical polymer levels. This allows for easier application of the coating.

One dispersion polymerization system being studied is the use of supercritical liquid carbon dioxide (scCO_{2}) as a solvent. Because of its unique solvent properties, supercritical CO_{2} is an ideal medium for dispersion polymerization for many soluble-monomer with insoluble-polymer systems. For example, polymers can be separated by releasing the high pressure under which the scCO_{2} is held. This process is more efficient than typical drying processes. Also, the principles of dispersion polymerization with scCO_{2} follows principles of green chemistry: low solvent toxicity, low waste, efficient atom economy, and avoidance of purification steps.
