= Vinylsulfonic acid =

Names
- Preferred IUPAC name Ethenesulfonic acid

Identifiers
CAS Number	1184-84-5; 3039-83-6 (sodium salt)
3D model (JSmol)	Interactive image
ChemSpider	56254
ECHA InfoCard	100.013.342
PubChem CID	62474
UNII	GJ6489R1WE; F7K3L38Z7B (sodium salt)
CompTox Dashboard (EPA)	DTXSID2047018
- InChI: InChI=1S/C2H4O3S/c1-2-6(3,4)5/h2H,1H2,(H,3,4,5) Key: NLVXSWCKKBEXTG-UHFFFAOYSA-N; InChI=1/C2H4O3S/c1-2-6(3,4)5/h2H,1H2,(H,3,4,5) Key: NLVXSWCKKBEXTG-UHFFFAOYAA
- SMILES: C=CS(=O)(=O)O

Properties
Chemical formula	C_{2}H_{4}O_{3}S
Molar mass	108.11 g·mol^{−1}
Appearance	colourless liquid
Boiling point	128 °C (1,29 hPa) * 95 °C
- Except where otherwise noted, data are given for materials in their standard state (at 25 °C [77 °F], 100 kPa). Infobox references

Vinylsulfonic acid is the organosulfur compound with the chemical formula CH_{2}=CHSO_{3}H. It is the simplest unsaturated sulfonic acid. The C=C double bond is a site of high reactivity. Polymerization gives polyvinylsulfonic acid, especially when used as a comonomer with functionalized vinyl and (meth)acrylic acid compounds. It is a colorless, water-soluble liquid, although commercial samples can appear yellow or even red.

== Preparation ==
Vinylsulfonic acid is produced industrially by the alkaline hydrolysis of carbyl sulfate with subsequent acidification of the resulting vinyl sulfonate salt:

The reaction is highly exothermic (reaction enthalpy: 1,675 kJ/kg) and requires exact maintenance of temperature and pH during the hydrolysis. When calcium hydroxide is used as the hydrolysis medium, a solution of calcium vinyl sulfonate is obtained. Acidification of this hydrolysis mixture with sulfuric acid gives vinylsulfonic acid, together with the poorly soluble calcium sulfate.

Vinylsulfonic acid also can be prepared by dehydration of isethionic acid with phosphorus pentoxide:

Vinylsulfonic acid can also be prepared by sulfochlorination of chloroethane, dehydrohalogenation to vinylsulfonyl chloride and subsequent hydrolysis of the acid chloride.

ClCH_{2}CH_{3} + SO_{2} + Cl_{2} → ClCH_{2}CH_{2}SO_{2}Cl + HCl

ClCH_{2}CH_{2}SO_{2}Cl → H_{2}C=CHSO_{2}Cl + HCl

CH_{2}=CHSO_{2}Cl + H_{2}O → H_{2}C=CHSO_{3}H + HCl

== Use ==
The activated C=C double bond of vinylsulfonic acid reacts readily with nucleophiles in an addition reaction. 2-Aminoethanesulfonic acid is formed with ammonia and 2-methylaminoethanesulfonic acid with methylamine.

Vinylsulfonic acid is the monomer in the preparation of highly acidic or anionic homopolymers and copolymers. These polymers are used in the electronic industry as photoresists, as ion-conductive polymer electrolyte membranes (PEM) for fuel cells. For example, transparent membranes with high ion exchange capacity and proton conductivity can be produced from polyvinylsulfonic acid.

== Research ==
Vinylsulfonic acid may also be grafted to polymeric supports (e.g. polystyrene) to give highly acidic ion exchangers, which used as catalysts for esterification and Friedel-Crafts acylations. Where the sulfonic acid functionality is not essential, the much more usable alkaline aqueous solution of sodium vinylsulfonate is used, which is obtained directly in the alkaline hydrolysis of the carbyl sulfate and is commercially supplied as an aqueous solution.
