= Methanedisulfonic acid =

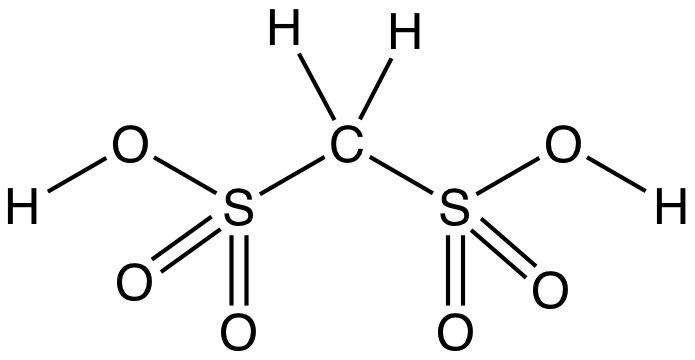

Names
- Preferred IUPAC name Methanedisulfonic acid
- Other names methionic acid

Identifiers
CAS Number	503-40-2
3D model (JSmol)	Interactive image
ChemSpider	9998
ECHA InfoCard	100.007.243
EC Number	207-966-4
PubChem CID	10427
UNII	55N1VUX48W
CompTox Dashboard (EPA)	DTXSID3060118
- InChI: InChI=1S/CH4O6S2/c2-8(3,4)1-9(5,6)7/h1H2,(H,2,3,4)(H,5,6,7) Key: OPUAWDUYWRUIIL-UHFFFAOYSA-N
- SMILES: C(S(=O)(=O)O)S(=O)(=O)O

Properties
Chemical formula	CH_{4}O_{6}S_{2}
Molar mass	176.16 g·mol^{−1}
Appearance	colourless solid
Melting point	138–140 °C (280–284 °F; 411–413 K)
Boiling point	209–210 °C (408–410 °F; 482–483 K)(decomposes)
Solubility in water	miscible
Acidity (pK_{a})	−0.71 (predicted)

Hazards
- GHS labelling
Pictograms	(GHS05: Corrosive)
Signal word	Danger
Hazard statements	H314, H413
Precautionary statements	P261, P264, P271, P280, P302+P352, P304+P340, P305+P351+P338, P312, P321, P332+P313, P337+P313, P362, P403+P233, P405, P501
- Except where otherwise noted, data are given for materials in their standard state (at 25 °C [77 °F], 100 kPa). Infobox references

Methanedisulfonic acid is the organosulfur compound with the formula CH_{2}(SO_{3}H)_{2}. It is the disulfonic acid of methane. It is prepared by treatment of methanesulfonic acid with oleum. Its acid strength (pK_{a}) is comparable to that of sulfuric acid.

== History and synthesis ==
The acid was first unknowingly prepared in 1833 by Gustav Magnus as a decomposition product of ethanedisulfonic acid during early attempts to synthesize diethyl ether from ethanol and anhydrous sulfuric acid by Magnus. Early investigations focused on ether production from alcohols and strong anhydrous acids. Liebig provided a detailed overview of the various sulfonic acids obtained from these reactions, and introduced the name "ethionic acid" for the sulfooxyethanesulfonic acid previously termed "Weinschwefelsäure". Josef Redtenbacher subsequently analyzed the barium salt of MDA and coined the name (still occasionally used) methionic acid, following Liebig's convention.

In 1856, Adolph Strecker analyzed various methionate salts and improved the synthesis from ether and anhydrous sulfuric acid by trapping evolving gases within the reaction vessel to maximize conversion. The same year, Buckton and Hofmann discovered a synthesis reaction from acetonitrile or acetamide with fuming sulfuric acid but didn't identify their product, designating it methylotetrasulphuric acid.

Georg Schroeter developed another method in 1897, treating acetylene with fuming sulfuric acid to obtain acetaldehyde disulfonic acids, which he then decomposed to methionic acid upon boiling in alkaline solution.

C_{2}H_{2} + H_{2}SO_{4} → CH_{3}CH(SO_{3}H)_{2}

However, all these early synthetic routes suffered from numerous byproducts. A higher-yielding synthesis was introduced by Hilmar Johannes Backer in 1929, treating dichloromethane (CH_{2}Cl_{2}) with potassium sulfite under hydrothermal conditions to get a methionate salt.

CH_{2}Cl_{2} + 2 K_{2}SO_{3} → CH_{2}(SO_{3}K)_{2} + 2 KCl

== See also ==
- 1,3-Propanedisulfonic acid
