= Starve-fed =

In emulsion polymerization, starve-fed refers to a method of monomer addition where the monomer is introduced gradually into the reaction vessel at a rate that allows the majority of monomer to be consumed by the reaction before more is added. The purpose of this method is generally to control the distribution of different monomers into a copolymer. Many monomers have different reaction rates and so, if all the monomers are added to the system at the same time, tend to react in blocks. This blockiness in the polymer leads to significantly different properties in the final polymer from one with a more statistically random distribution of monomers.

This method is utilized in synthesizing core-shell latex particles by emulsion polymerization, in order to carefully prepare the final structure.
