= Emulsion polymerization =

Polymerization reaction among insoluble monomers in a solution

In polymer chemistry, emulsion polymerization is a type of radical polymerization that usually starts with an emulsion incorporating water, monomers, and surfactants. The most common type of emulsion polymerization is an oil-in-water emulsion, in which droplets of monomer (the oil) are emulsified (with surfactants) in a continuous phase of water. Water-soluble polymers, such as certain polyvinyl alcohols or hydroxyethyl cellulose, can also be used to act as emulsifiers/stabilizers. The name "emulsion polymerization" is a misnomer that arises from a historical misconception. Rather than occurring in emulsion droplets, polymerization takes place in the latex/colloid particles that form spontaneously in the first few minutes of the process. These latex particles are typically 100 nm in size, and are made of many individual polymer chains. The particles are prevented from coagulating with each other because each particle is surrounded by the surfactant ('soap'); the charge on the surfactant repels other particles electrostatically. When water-soluble polymers are used as stabilizers instead of soap, the repulsion between particles arises because these water-soluble polymers form a 'hairy layer' around a particle that repels other particles, because pushing particles together would involve compressing these chains.

Emulsion polymerization is used to make several commercially important polymers. Many of these polymers are used as solid materials and must be isolated from the aqueous dispersion after polymerization. In other cases the dispersion itself is the end product. A dispersion resulting from emulsion polymerization is often called a latex (especially if derived from a synthetic rubber) or an emulsion (even though "emulsion" strictly speaking refers to a dispersion of an immiscible liquid in water). These emulsions find applications in adhesives, paints, paper coating and textile coatings. They are often preferred over solvent-based products in these applications due to the absence of volatile organic compounds (VOCs) in them.

IUPAC definition

Emulsion polymerization: Polymerization whereby monomer(s), initiator, dispersion
medium, and possibly colloid stabilizer constitute initially an inhomogeneous system
resulting in particles of colloidal dimensions containing the formed polymer.

Note: With the exception of mini-emulsion polymerization, the term “emulsion polymerization”
does not mean that polymerization occurs in the droplets of a monomer emulsion.

Batch emulsion polymerization: Emulsion polymerization in which all the ingredients are
placed in a reactor prior to reaction.

Advantages of emulsion polymerization include:

- High molecular weight polymers can be made at fast polymerization rates. By contrast, in bulk and solution free-radical polymerization, there is a tradeoff between molecular weight and polymerization rate.
- The continuous water phase is an excellent conductor of heat, enabling fast polymerization rates without loss of temperature control.
- Since polymer molecules are contained within the particles, the viscosity of the reaction medium remains close to that of water and is not dependent on molecular weight.
- The final product can be used as is and does not generally need to be altered or processed.

Disadvantages of emulsion polymerization include:

- Surfactants and other polymerization adjuvants remain in the polymer or are difficult to remove
- For dry (isolated) polymers, water removal is an energy-intensive process
- Emulsion polymerizations are usually designed to operate at high conversion of monomer to polymer. This can result in significant chain transfer to polymer.
- Can not be used for condensation, ionic, or Ziegler-Natta polymerization, although some exceptions are known.

== History ==
The early history of emulsion polymerization is connected with the field of synthetic rubber. The idea of using an emulsified monomer in an aqueous suspension or emulsion was first conceived at Bayer, before World War I, in an attempt to prepare synthetic rubber. The impetus for this development was the observation that natural rubber is produced at room temperature in dispersed particles stabilized by colloidal polymers, so the industrial chemists tried to duplicate these conditions. The Bayer workers used naturally occurring polymers such as gelatin, ovalbumin, and starch to stabilize their dispersion. By today's definition these were not true emulsion polymerizations, but suspension polymerizations.

The first "true" emulsion polymerizations, which used a surfactant and polymerization initiator, were conducted in the 1920s to polymerize isoprene. Over the next twenty years, through the end of World War II, efficient methods for production of several forms of synthetic rubber by emulsion polymerization were developed, but relatively few publications in the scientific literature appeared: most disclosures were confined to patents or were kept secret due to wartime needs.

After World War II, emulsion polymerization was extended to production of plastics. Manufacture of dispersions to be used in latex paints and other products sold as liquid dispersions commenced. Ever more sophisticated processes were devised to prepare products that replaced solvent-based materials. Ironically, synthetic rubber manufacture turned more and more away from emulsion polymerization as new organometallic catalysts were developed that allowed much better control of polymer architecture.

== Theoretical overview ==
The first successful theory to explain the distinct features of emulsion polymerization was developed by Smith and Ewart, and Harkins in the 1940s, based on their studies of polystyrene. Smith and Ewart arbitrarily divided the mechanism of emulsion polymerization into three stages or intervals. Subsequently, it has been recognized that not all monomers or systems undergo these particular three intervals. Nevertheless, the Smith-Ewart description is a useful starting point to analyze emulsion polymerizations.

Schematic of emulsion polymerization

The Smith-Ewart-Harkins theory for the mechanism of free-radical emulsion polymerization is summarized by the following steps:

- A monomer is dispersed or emulsified in a solution of surfactant and water, forming relatively large droplets in water.
- Excess surfactant creates micelles in the water.
- Small amounts of monomer diffuse through the water to the micelle.
- A water-soluble initiator is introduced into the water phase where it reacts with monomer in the micelles. (This characteristic differs from suspension polymerization where an oil-soluble initiator dissolves in the monomer, followed by polymer formation in the monomer droplets themselves.) This is considered Smith-Ewart interval 1.
- The total surface area of the micelles is much greater than the total surface area of the fewer, larger monomer droplets; therefore the initiator typically reacts in the micelle and not the monomer droplet.
- Monomer in the micelle quickly polymerizes and the growing chain terminates. At this point the monomer-swollen micelle has turned into a polymer particle. When both monomer droplets and polymer particles are present in the system, this is considered Smith-Ewart interval 2.
- More monomer from the droplets diffuses to the growing particle, where more initiators will eventually react.
- Eventually the free monomer droplets disappear and all remaining monomer is located in the particles. This is considered Smith-Ewart interval 3.
- Depending on the particular product and monomer, additional monomer and initiator may be continuously and slowly added to maintain their levels in the system as the particles grow.
- The final product is a dispersion of polymer particles in water. It can also be known as a polymer colloid, a latex, or commonly and inaccurately as an 'emulsion'.

Smith-Ewart theory does not predict the specific polymerization behavior when the monomer is somewhat water-soluble, like methyl methacrylate or vinyl acetate. In these cases homogeneous nucleation occurs: particles are formed without the presence or need for surfactant micelles.

High molecular weights are developed in emulsion polymerization because the concentration of growing chains within each polymer particle is very low. In conventional radical polymerization, the concentration of growing chains is higher, which leads to termination by coupling, which ultimately results in shorter polymer chains. The original Smith-Ewart-Hawkins mechanism required each particle to contain either zero or one growing chain. Improved understanding of emulsion polymerization has relaxed that criterion to include more than one growing chain per particle, however, the number of growing chains per particle is still considered to be very low.

Because of the complex chemistry that occurs during an emulsion polymerization, including polymerization kinetics and particle formation kinetics, quantitative understanding of the mechanism of emulsion polymerization has required extensive computer simulation. Robert Gilbert has summarized a recent theory.

== More detailed treatment of Smith-Ewart theory ==
=== Interval 1 ===
When radicals generated in the aqueous phase encounter the monomer within the micelle, they initiate polymerization. The conversion of monomer to polymer within the micelle lowers the monomer concentration and generates a monomer concentration gradient. Consequently, the monomer from monomer droplets and uninitiated micelles begin to diffuse to the growing, polymer-containing, particles. Those micelles that did not encounter a radical during the earlier stage of conversion begin to disappear, losing their monomer and surfactant to the growing particles. The theory predicts that after the end of this interval, the number of growing polymer particles remains constant.

=== Interval 2 ===
This interval is also known as steady state reaction stage. Throughout this stage, monomer droplets act as reservoirs supplying monomer to the growing polymer particles by diffusion through the water. While at steady state, the ratio of free radicals per particle can be divided into three cases. When the number of free radicals per particle is less than 1/2, this is called Case 1. When the number of free radicals per particle equals 1/2, this is called Case 2. And when there is greater than 1/2 radical per particle, this is called Case 3. Smith-Ewart theory predicts that Case 2 is the predominant scenario for the following reasons. A monomer-swollen particle that has been struck by a radical contains one growing chain. Because only one radical (at the end of the growing polymer chain) is present, the chain cannot terminate, and it will continue to grow until a second initiator radical enters the particle. As the rate of termination is much greater than the rate of propagation, and because the polymer particles are extremely small, chain growth is terminated immediately after the entrance of the second initiator radical. The particle then remains dormant until a third initiator radical enters, initiating the growth of a second chain. Consequently, the polymer particles in this case either have zero radicals (dormant state), or 1 radical (polymer growing state) and a very short period of 2 radicals (terminating state) which can be ignored for the free radicals per particle calculation. At any given time, a micelle contains either one growing chain or no growing chains (assumed to be equally probable). Thus, on average, there is around 1/2 radical per particle, leading to the Case 2 scenario. The polymerization rate in this stage can be expressed by

$$R_p = k_p[\mathrm{M}][\mathrm{P}^\bullet]$$
where $k_p$ is the homogeneous propagation rate constant for polymerization within the particles and $[\mathrm{M}]$ is the equilibrium monomer concentration within a particle. $[\mathrm{P}^\bullet]$ represents the overall concentration of polymerizing radicals in the reaction. For Case 2, where the average number of free radicals per micelle are $1/2$, $[\mathrm{P}^\bullet]$ can be calculated in following expression:

$$[\mathrm{P}^\bullet] = \frac{N_\mathrm{micelles}}{2N_\mathrm{A}}$$
where $N_\mathrm{micelles}$ is number concentration of micelles (number of micelles per unit volume), and $N_\mathrm{A}$ is the Avogadro constant (6.02×10^{23} mol^{−1}). Consequently, the rate of polymerization is then

$$R_p = k_p[\mathrm{M}]\frac{N_\mathrm{micelles}}{2N_\mathrm{A}}.$$

=== Interval 3 ===
Separate monomer droplets disappear as the reaction continues. Polymer particles in this stage may be sufficiently large enough that they contain more than 1 radical per particle.

== Process considerations ==
Emulsion polymerizations have been used in batch, semi-batch, and continuous processes. The choice depends on the properties desired in the final polymer or dispersion and on the economics of the product. Modern process control schemes have enabled the development of complex reaction processes, with ingredients such as initiator, monomer, and surfactant added at the beginning, during, or at the end of the reaction.

Early styrene-butadiene rubber (SBR) recipes are examples of true batch processes: all ingredients added at the same time to the reactor. Semi-batch recipes usually include a programmed feed of monomer to the reactor. This enables a starve-fed reaction to ensure a good distribution of monomers into the polymer backbone chain. Continuous processes have been used to manufacture various grades of synthetic rubber.

Some polymerizations are stopped before all the monomer has reacted. This minimizes chain transfer to polymer. In such cases the monomer must be removed or stripped from the dispersion.

Colloidal stability is a factor in design of an emulsion polymerization process. For dry or isolated products, the polymer dispersion must be isolated, or converted into solid form. This can be accomplished by simple heating of the dispersion until all water evaporates. More commonly, the dispersion is destabilized (sometimes called "broken") by addition of a multivalent cation. Alternatively, acidification will destabilize a dispersion with a carboxylic acid surfactant. These techniques may be employed in combination with application of shear to increase the rate of destabilization. After isolation of the polymer, it is usually washed, dried, and packaged.

By contrast, products sold as a dispersion are designed with a high degree of colloidal stability. Colloidal properties such as particle size, particle size distribution, and viscosity are of critical importance to the performance of these dispersions.

Living polymerization processes that are carried out via emulsion polymerization such as iodine-transfer polymerization and RAFT have been developed.

Controlled coagulation techniques can enable better control of the particle size and distribution.

== Components ==
=== Monomers ===
Typical monomers are those that undergo radical polymerization, are liquid or gaseous at reaction conditions, and are poorly soluble in water. Solid monomers are difficult to disperse in water. If monomer solubility is too high, particle formation may not occur and the reaction kinetics reduce to that of solution polymerization.

Ethene and other simple olefins must be polymerized at very high pressures (up to 800 bar).

=== Comonomers ===
Copolymerization is common in emulsion polymerization. The same rules and comonomer pairs that exist in radical polymerization operate in emulsion polymerization. However, copolymerization kinetics are greatly influenced by the aqueous solubility of the monomers. Monomers with greater aqueous solubility will tend to partition in the aqueous phase and not in the polymer particle. They will not get incorporated as readily in the polymer chain as monomers with lower aqueous solubility. This can be avoided by a programmed addition of monomer using a semi-batch process.

Ethene and other alkenes are used as minor comonomers in emulsion polymerization, notably in vinyl acetate copolymers.

Small amounts of acrylic acid or other ionizable monomers are sometimes used to confer colloidal stability to a dispersion.

=== Initiators ===
Both thermal and redox generation of free radicals have been used in emulsion polymerization. Persulfate salts are commonly used in both initiation modes. The persulfate ion readily breaks up into sulfate radical ions above about 50°C, providing a thermal source of initiation. Redox initiation takes place when an oxidant such as a persulfate salt, a reducing agent such as glucose, Rongalite, or sulfite, and a redox catalyst such as an iron compound are all included in the polymerization recipe. Redox recipes are not limited by temperature and are used for polymerizations that take place below 50°C.

Although organic peroxides and hydroperoxides are used in emulsion polymerization, initiators are usually water soluble and partition into the water phase. This enables the particle generation behavior described in the theory section. In redox initiation, either the oxidant or the reducing agent (or both) must be water-soluble, but one component can be water-insoluble.

=== Surfactants ===
Selection of the correct surfactant is critical to the development of any emulsion polymerization process. The surfactant must enable a fast rate of polymerization, minimize coagulum or fouling in the reactor and other process equipment, prevent an unacceptably high viscosity during polymerization (which leads to poor heat transfer), and maintain or even improve properties in the final product such as tensile strength, gloss, and water absorption.

Anionic, nonionic, and cationic surfactants have been used, although anionic surfactants are by far most prevalent. Surfactants with a low critical micelle concentration (CMC) are favored; the polymerization rate shows a dramatic increase when the surfactant level is above the CMC, and minimization of the surfactant is preferred for economic reasons and the (usually) adverse effect of surfactant on the physical properties of the resulting polymer. Mixtures of surfactants are often used, including mixtures of anionic with nonionic surfactants. Mixtures of cationic and anionic surfactants form insoluble salts and are not useful.

Examples of surfactants commonly used in emulsion polymerization include fatty acids, sodium lauryl sulfate, and alpha-olefin sulfonate.

=== Non-surfactant stabilizers ===
Some grades of polyvinyl alcohol and other water-soluble polymers can promote emulsion polymerization even though they do not typically form micelles and do not act as surfactants (for example, they do not lower surface tension). It is believed that growing polymer chains graft onto these water-soluble polymers, which stabilize the resulting particles.

Dispersions prepared with such stabilizers typically exhibit excellent colloidal stability (for example, dry powders may be mixed into the dispersion without causing coagulation). However, they often result in products that are very water sensitive due to the presence of the water-soluble polymer.

=== Other ingredients ===
Other ingredients found in emulsion polymerization include chain transfer agents, buffering agents, and inert salts. Preservatives are added to products sold as liquid dispersions to retard bacterial growth. These are usually added after polymerization, however.

== Applications ==
Polymers produced by emulsion polymerization can roughly be divided into three categories.

- Synthetic rubber
  - Some grades of styrene-butadiene (SBR)
  - Some grades of Polybutadiene
  - Polychloroprene (Neoprene)
  - Nitrile rubber
  - Acrylic rubber
  - Fluoroelastomer (FKM)
- Plastics
  - Some grades of PVC
  - Some grades of polystyrene
  - Some grades of PMMA
  - Acrylonitrile-butadiene-styrene terpolymer (ABS)
  - Polyvinylidene fluoride
  - Polyvinyl fluoride
  - PTFE
- Dispersions (i.e. polymers sold as aqueous dispersions)
  - polyvinyl acetate
  - polyvinyl acetate copolymers
  - polyacrylates
  - Styrene-butadiene
  - VAE (vinyl acetate – ethylene copolymers)

== See also ==
- International Union of Pure and Applied Chemistry
- Radical polymerization
- RAFT (chemistry)
- Robert Gilbert
- Dispersion polymerization
- Ray P. Dinsmore
