= Robert Gilbert (chemist) =

Australian polymer chemist

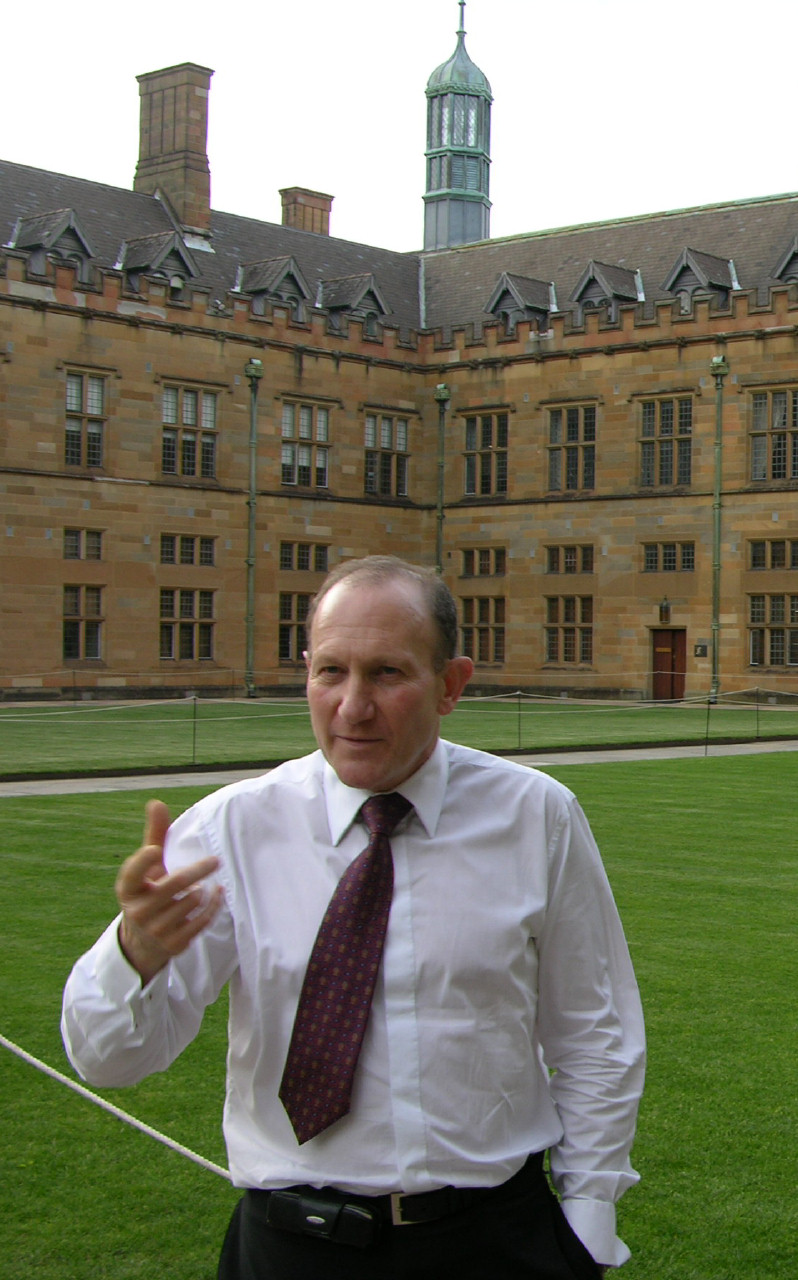
Gilbert in 2004

Robert Goulston Gilbert (born 1946) is a polymer chemist whose most significant contributions have been in the field of emulsion polymerisation. In 1970 he gained his PhD from the Australian National University, and worked at the University of Sydney from then until 2006. In 1982, he was elected a fellow of the Royal Australian Chemical Institute; in 1994 he was elected a fellow of the Australian Academy of Science. In 1992, he was appointed full professor, and in 1999 he started the Key Centre for Polymer Colloids, funded by the Australian Research Council, the University and industry. He has served in leadership roles in the International Union of Pure and Applied Chemistry (IUPAC), the world ‘governing body’ of chemistry. He was founding chair (1987–98) of the IUPAC Working Party on the Modelling of Kinetics Processes of Polymerisation, of which he remains a member, and is a member of the IUPAC scientific task groups on starch molecular weight measurements, and terminology. He was vice-president (1996–97) and president (1998–2001) of the IUPAC Macromolecular Division, and secretary of the International Polymer Colloids Group (1997–2001). As of 2007, he is Research Professor at the Centre of Nutrition and Food Science, University of Queensland, where his research program concentrates on the relations between starch structure and nutrition.

His scientific advances have been based on developing novel theoretical and experimental methods to isolate individual processes in very complex systems. By revealing the mechanistic bases of these individual processes through a combination of theory and experiment, he has significantly deepened, and in some cases revolutionised, the understanding of whole systems in small (gas-phase) and giant (polymer) reaction dynamics.

== Unimolecular reaction dynamics ==
Reactions in chemical processes are either unimolecular or bimolecular. The rate of a unimolecular reaction is an average over a vast ensemble of the rate coefficients for the microscopic events of collisional energy transfer and of reaction of a completely isolated molecule. Gilbert's work in the field of unimolecular processes started with the development of theorems for this relationship. These theorems are elegant developments in matrix algebra, proving relations that had been previously known only for particular cases. His theorems also became the basis for numerical methods that he developed to perform the requisite calculations. For this purpose, he created a computer code, UNIMOL, which is widely used by researchers.

With Prof J Troe he developed easily used approximate solutions for the pressure dependence of the rate coefficient. He provided the first solutions for cases where angular momentum conservation needs to be incorporated. His methods are used by experimentalists to fit data and extrapolate to different pressure regimes, supplanting previous tools which were of dubious validity and accuracy. His coworkers and he obtained data on the collisional energy transfer process and used them to prove the conjecture that each collision involves only a small exchange of energy. He then developed the first rigorous means to calculate these quantities from basic theory, and the first physical model for the process. His work is widely used, both for basic understanding of the transition states and by atmospheric and combustion modellers. Predicting climate change and effects on the ozone layer rely critically on this modelling.

== Emulsion polymerisation ==
Emulsion polymerisation is the commonest means of making a wide variety of industrial polymers, such as paints, adhesives and tyre rubber. It is a complex process involving many simultaneous and separate processes and where historically only a few types of data were available. The complexity and the limited data types meant that conflicting assumptions could be forced to agree with experiment: there was no proper understanding of the process. Gilbert developed and applied mathematical and experimental tools whereby the effects resulting from individual processes could be isolated for the first time.

As with unimolecular reactions, the keys to the qualitative and quantitative understanding of the many processes in emulsion polymerisation are the rate coefficients of the individual steps. These steps are initiation (how quickly a growing chain starts), propagation (how quickly individual monomer units are added), radical loss processes (the termination and transfer of radical activity), and particle formation (nucleation). With Prof D Napper, Gilbert applied equations that he had solved in gas-phase chemistry to the area of emulsion polymerisation. This opened the way for him to develop—initially in collaboration with Napper—new theoretical and experimental methods for extracting the rate coefficients of elementary processes. He produced targeted data using these methods, particularly the time evolution of reaction rates and molecular-weight and particle-size distributions. This included novel types of systems, such as γ-radiolysis relaxation, in which events such as radical loss can be separated from radical propagation and growth.

Gilbert's mathematical treatments and experimental techniques revealed the fundamentals controlling these steps by enabling each of the processes to be effectively studied in isolation. His advances allowed rate coefficients to be measured for virtually any process in emulsion polymerisation, values of these rate coefficients for simple systems to be predicted, and the reliability of new measurements to be checked from theory. He used data from applying these methods to obtain the dependence of rate coefficients on controllable quantities, such as initiator concentration. Thus he tested existing models, developed new tests (some of which refuted extant models), and refined the older models that withstood his tests, making it possible to achieve consistency between supposed microscopic events and experiment, and, for the very first time in the field, to refute postulated models authoritatively.

Using these data he quantified radical loss from particles, showing that simple diffusion theory could explain the results. Gilbert and his coworkers then revealed the mechanism for initiation in emulsion polymerisation by the entry of radicals into particles—in terms of fundamental thermodynamic and kinetic precepts—in a theory that clarifies the process as being through production of surface-active species in the water phase. This model produced various qualitative predictions. One prediction, that of the independence of the entry-rate coefficient of the size and surface properties of particles, was widely seen as counterintuitive because of the deep-rooted belief in models that he had shown to be wrong. Subsequently, this prediction was experimentally verified by Gilbert and others. He used the understanding from this knowledge to develop a priori models for particle formation and molecular-weight distribution.

These developments led to an understanding of basic processes in free-radical polymerisation—the commonest industrial process. For the propagation reaction Gilbert led an international team that produced a methodology that overcame the long-standing problem of obtaining reliable rate coefficients for this process. He showed that the Arrhenius parameters for different types of monomer take different classes of values, and developed qualitative and quantitative understanding of these classes from fundamental transition-state theory and quantum mechanics. These new methods were based on those that he had developed in his work on unimolecular gas-phase processes. For the termination reaction, his data and models led to the qualitative and quantitative understanding of this process as diffusion-controlled.

As a result of Gilbert’s work, all individual processes in emulsion polymerisation, one of the commonest ways of making everyday products, are now qualitatively and quantitatively understood. It is now possible to polymerise simple systems and to predict the molecular architecture that will be formed under chosen conditions, while for more complex conditions, trends can be semiquantitatively predicted and understood. The international scientific and technical community in this field now uses the mechanistic knowledge that he obtained as the key to understanding current processes and creating new processes and products. His work has put this industrially important field on a rigorous scientific footing.

Gilbert and others have used this knowledge and understanding to develop means of creating new materials. One major example includes his role as leader of a collaborative project that has led to a new generation of surface coatings. He developed the first practical means to implement on industrially significant scales Dr E Rizzardo’s reversible addition-fragmentation chain transfer (RAFT) method of controlled radical polymerisation.

== Enzymatic processes in starch biosynthesis ==
Gilbert has developed a new way of understanding the biochemistry of the enzymatic processes involved in starch biosynthesis, in collaboration with Dr Melissa Fitzgerald, International Rice Research Institute, Manilla. In this new field he applied the methods he had developed for understanding molecular-weight distributions in synthetic polymers to understanding those of natural ones. He has thus created a powerful new technique for probing the enzymatic processes in starch biosynthesis in grains, again, creating a methodology to obtain reliable mechanistic knowledge by isolating steps in highly complex systems. Each enzymatic step that creates individual chains—analysed by debranching the starch—can now be associated with particular regions in the molecular-weight distribution of a starch. This supported the applicability of one of two rival mechanistic postulates made by starch biochemists.

== Notes ==
1. Theory of unimolecular and recombination reactions. RG Gilbert, SC Smith. Oxford: Blackwell Scientific Publications (1990)
2. "Theory of thermal unimolecular reactions in the fall-off range. II. Weak collision rate constants". RG Gilbert, K Luther, J Troe, Ber Bunsenges Phys Chem, 87, 169–77 (1982)
3. Emulsion polymerization: a mechanistic approach. RG Gilbert. London: Academic Press (1995)
4. "The entry of free radicals into latex particles in emulsion polymerization". IA Maxwell, BR Morrison, DH Napper, RG Gilbert, Macromolecules, 24, 1629–40 (1991)
5. "First-principles calculation of particle formation in emulsion polymerization: pseudo-bulk systems". EM Coen, S Peach, BR Morrison, RG Gilbert. Polymer, 45, 3595–3608 (2004)
6. "Molecular weight distributions in free-radical polymerizations. Understanding the effects of chain-length-dependent termination". PA Clay, RG Gilbert. Macromolecules, 28, 552–69 (1995)
7. "Critically evaluated rate coefficients for free-radical polymerization. 1. Propagation rate coefficients for styrene". M Buback, RG Gilbert, RA Hutchinson, B Klumperman, F-D Kuchta, BG Manders, KF O’Driscoll, GT Russell, J Schweer. Macromol. Chem. Phys., 196, 3267–80 (1995)
8. "A priori prediction of propagation rate coefficients in free radical polymerizations: propagation of ethylene". JPA Heuts, RG Gilbert, L Radom. Macromolecules, 28, 8771–81 (1995)
9. "Mechanistic information from analysis of molecular weight distributions of starch". JV Castro, C Dumas, H Chiou, MA Fitzgerald, RG Gilbert, Biomacromolecules, 6, 2248–59 (2005)
