= Ethanedisulfonic acid =

Ethane disulfonic acid
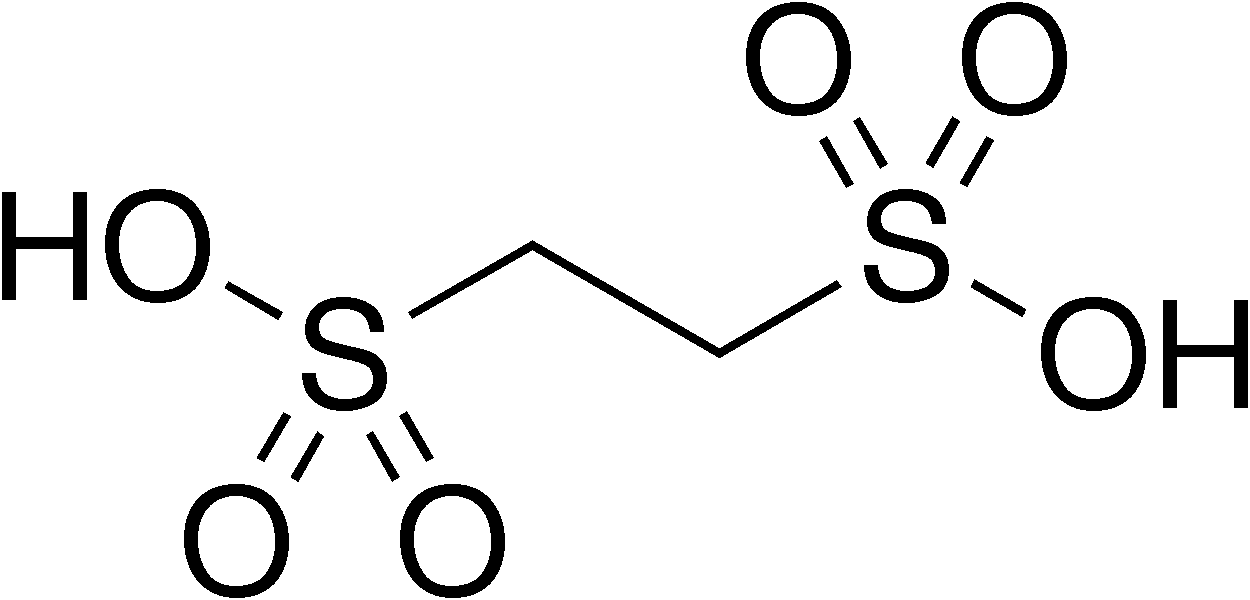
- Skeletal formula

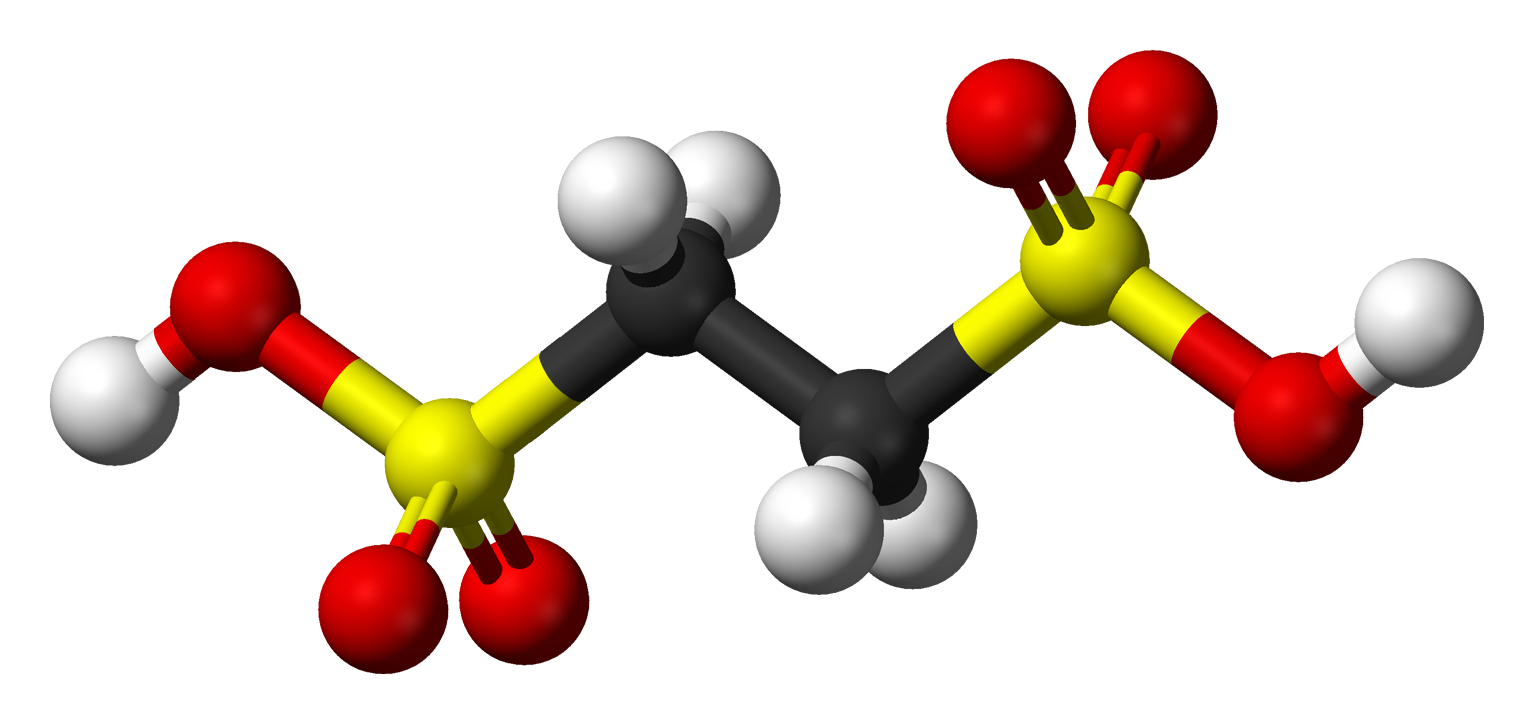
- Ball-and-stick model

Names
- Preferred IUPAC name Ethane-1,2-disulfonic acid
- Other names Edisylic acid

Identifiers
CAS Number	110-04-3
3D model (JSmol)	Interactive image
ChemSpider	7741
ECHA InfoCard	100.003.394
PubChem CID	8032
UNII	DL69Y31QQV
CompTox Dashboard (EPA)	DTXSID00149089
- InChI: InChI=1S/C2H6O6S2/c3-9(4,5)1-2-10(6,7)8/h1-2H2,(H,3,4,5)(H,6,7,8) Key: AFAXGSQYZLGZPG-UHFFFAOYSA-N; InChI=1/C2H6O6S2/c3-9(4,5)1-2-10(6,7)8/h1-2H2,(H,3,4,5)(H,6,7,8) Key: AFAXGSQYZLGZPG-UHFFFAOYAT
- SMILES: OS(=O)(=O)CCS(=O)(=O)O

Properties
Chemical formula	C_{2}H_{6}O_{6}S_{2}
Molar mass	190.18 g·mol^{−1}
Melting point	172 to 174 °C (342 to 345 °F; 445 to 447 K); 111-112 °C (dihydrate)
- Except where otherwise noted, data are given for materials in their standard state (at 25 °C [77 °F], 100 kPa). verify (what is ?) Infobox references

Ethanedisulfonic acid is a diprotic sulfonic acid, with pKa values of -1.46 and -2.06, making it a very strong acid. When used in pharmaceutical formulations, the salts with the active ingredient are known as edisylates.

== See also ==
- Methanedisulfonic acid
- 1,3-Propanedisulfonic acid
- Isethionic acid
