= Isethionates =

Isethionates are esters of long-chain aliphatic carboxylic acids (C_{8} – C_{18}) with isethionic acid (2-hydroxyethanesulfonic acid) or salts thereof, such as ammonium isethionate or sodium isethionate. They are also referred to as acyl isethionates or acyloxyethanesulfonates.

Like the taurides, isethionates are a class of particularly mild anionic surfactants which, unlike ordinary soaps, retain their washing-active properties even in hard water. Isethionates are obtained on an industrial scale reacting mixtures of carboxylic acids with salts of isethionic acid under acidic catalysis e. g. with methanesulfonic acid. The mixtures of carboxylic acids are obtained from the hydrolysis of animal fats (tallow) or vegetable oils, preferably coconut oil, but also palm oil, soybean oil or castor oil.

Isethionates are solids which are often mixed with fatty acids (up to 30% by weight) to lower their freezing point. Despite its low water solubility (100ppm at 25 °C), the lower-priced sodium cocoylisethionate has found more widespread use than its well water-soluble ammonium salt (> 25 wt.% at 25 °C). To solubilize the sparsely soluble isethionates and taurides, the formation of mixtures with amphoteric surfactants (such as cocamidopropyl betaine) are proposed. From such mixtures, it is possible to prepare liquid, clear and transparent aqueous concentrates which are liquid at room temperature.

Isethionates are characterized by excellent skin compatibility, excellent foaming (even in hard water), good cleansing properties and a pleasant skin feel. They are non-toxic and readily biodegradable. However, in contrast to the taurides, they are not long-term stable outside a pH range of 5 to 8. Isethionates are used in solid soaps (so-called syndet bars) and in other personal care products such as lotions, washing and shower gels, shampoos, liquid soaps, shaving creams, and other cosmetic and dermatological preparations.

== List ==
name	formula	n	Mol Wt	CASNo	EC Number	UNII	PubChem CID	SMILES
Sodium butyl isethionates	C6H11NaO5S	0	218.199	61789-32-0	263-052-5		CID 123134487 from PubChem	CCCC(=O)OCCS(=O)(=O)[O-].[Na+]
Sodium capryloyl isethionate	C10H19NaO5S	2	274.307	38207-61-3		AR33Z8R7V7	CID 71587139 from PubChem	CCCCCCCC(=O)OCCS(=O)(=O)[O-].[Na+]
Sodium caproyl isethionate	C12H23NaO5S	3	302.361	29454-06-6	249-638-3	7K2K7966IN	CID 73555691 from PubChem	CCCCCCCCCC(=O)OCCS(=O)(=O)[O-].[Na+]
Sodium lauroyl isethionate	C14H27NaO5S	4	330.415	7381-01-3	230-949-8	M590021Z02	CID 23668826 from PubChem	CCCCCCCCCCCC(=O)OCCS(=O)(=O)[O-].[Na+]
Sodium palmitoyl isethionate	C18H35NaO5S	6	386.523	36915-65-8	253-273-5	O4087ZSO8U	CID 23688965 from PubChem	CCCCCCCCCCCCCCCC(=O)OCCS(=O)(=O)[O-].[Na+]

== Literature ==
Wilfried Umbach (Hrsg.), Kosmetik und Hygiene von Kopf bis Fuß, Wiley-VCH Verlag GmbH & Co. KGaA, 3. vollst. überarb. u. erw. Auflage (27. Juli 2012), ISBN 978-3-527-30996-2
