= Taurates =

Generic structure of a taurate. R is an odd numbered alkyl group C_{n}H_{2n+1} with n = 7 – 17 carbon atoms.

Taurates (or taurides) are a group of mild anionic surfactants. They are composed of a hydrophilic head group, consisting of N-methyltaurine (2-methylaminoethanesulfonic acid) and a lipophilic residue, consisting of a long-chain carboxylic acid (fatty acid), both linked via an amide bond. The fatty acids used could be lauric (C_{12}), myristic (C_{14}), palmitic (C_{16}) or stearic acid (C_{18}), but mainly mixtures of oleic acid (C_{18:1}) and coconut fatty acid (C_{8} – C_{18}) are used. Besides sodium, no other counterions play a relevant role (these could be e. g. ammonium or other alkali or alkaline earth metals).

== History ==
The surfactant group of the taurates was developed by I.G. Farben in Germany (just like the isethionates) and produced under the trade name Igepon at the Hoechst plant. Taurates rapidly spread due to their lime resistance and their oil-removing effect in textile treatment, as detergent raw material and in cosmetics applications. They had a breakthrough in particular because they do not felt wool during washing (as opposed to soap). The production of taurates decreased after the outbreak of the World War II, since only poor quality fatty acids were available due to the fat management.

== Production ==
Taurates were first obtained by the Schotten-Baumann method which is the reaction of long-chain carboxylic acid chlorides with aqueous solutions of the sodium salt of N-methyltaurine.

The formation of (at least) equimolar amounts of sodium chloride is problematic, as they worsen the properties of surfactant mixtures with such taurates. The high salt content also makes the resulting taurates hygroscopic and corrosive. Another disadvantage of the Schotten-Baumann method is the hazardousness of the raw materials (such as phosphorus trichloride) and the intermediates (the acyl chlorides) and the accumulation of large amounts of waste materials, such as phosphonic acids. This synthesis pathway for taurates is therefore complicated and expensive. An advantage of the Schotten-Baumann method, however, is the very low content of free fatty acids in the end product. Taurates are also accessible by direct amidation of N-methyltaurine or its sodium salt with the corresponding fatty acid for 10 hours at 220 °C under nitrogen.

The excess fatty acid (added for a favorable equilibrium) usually remain in the product, which can interfere with some applications. The decomposition of N-methyltaurine already begins At temperatures above 200 °C and the resulting taurates darken and develop an unpleasant smell. Therefore, more recent variants of the direct amidation aim at gentler process conditions using suitable catalysts, such as sodium borohydride, boric acid or zinc oxide.

== Properties ==
At room temperature, taurates are usually pasty masses, which dissolve well in water and react then neutral to slightly alkaline (pH 7–8). Their toxicity is low (the LD_{50}, rat, oral is 7800 mg·kg^{−1} for cocoyl tauride). They are easily biodegradable, they are not prone to bioaccumulation, but they are harmful to aquatic organisms (like all surfactants). Due to their amide bond, taurates are stable in a much wider pH range (about 2–10) than the corresponding esters, as for example isethionates. They are very mild surfactants with good foaming ability and high foam stability, even in the presence of fats and oils. Taurates retain their good washing properties even in hard water or seawater. Taurates are suitable in concentrations of about 2% as co-surfactants because of their good compatibility with all nonionic and anionic surfactants.

== Use ==
Taurates are used as mild, well-foaming surfactants in body cleansing and personal care products (shampoos, liquid soaps and cleansers, face lotions, skin creams, bubble baths, syndet soaps), textile processing (wetting agents and detergents, dye dispersants), in crop protection formulations and in other industrial applications.

== Literature ==
- Wilfried Umbach (Hrsg.), Kosmetik und Hygiene von Kopf bis Fuß, Wiley-VCH Verlag GmbH & Co. KGaA, 3. vollst. überarb. u. erw. Auflage (2012), ISBN 978-3-527-30996-2.
