= David S. Breslow =

American chemist (1916–1995)

- Breslow in November 1982
- Born: August 13, 1916; New York City, U.S.
- Died: May 26, 1995 (aged 78); Newark, Delaware, U.S.
- Resting place: Jewish Community Cemetery, Brandywine Hundred
- Education: City University of New York (B.S.); Duke University (Ph.D)
- Spouse: Ann Goodman Breslow
- Children: 3
- Scientific career
- Fields: Polymer chemistry
- Workplaces: Hercules, Inc.; University of Delaware

David S. Breslow (August 13, 1916 – May 26, 1995) was an American industrial chemist best known for his work on polymers.

== Early life and education ==
Breslow was born on August 13, 1916, and raised in Queens, New York. He developed an early interest in chemistry after inheriting a chemistry set which he and a friend used to make stink bombs. He graduated from City College of New York in 1937 and subsequently earned a doctorate in organic chemistry from Duke University in 1940. During World War II, he did post-doctoral work at the California Institute of Technology and research at the University of California, Berkeley and Duke.

== Career ==
In 1946, he joined the chemical manufacturing company Hercules. He rose through the ranks, and in 1971, he was named senior research associate of the New Enterprise Department, the top technical position at the company.

His research focused on polymers. He helped develop catalysts for the chemical reactions that produce polyethylene and polypropylene, and worked on the stabilization of those materials, leading to a wide array of consumer plastics applications. He also conducted research on the potential use of copolymer MVE-2 as a cancer drug.

He taught part-time at the University of Delaware from 1972 to 1987. During the academic year from 1964 to 1965, he took a sabbatical at LMU Munich in Germany, and in 1971 he taught at the University of Notre Dame.

Over the course of his career, he acquired 79 patents and authored 90 scientific papers as well as a two-volume textbook on polymers.

He was president of the Delaware chapter of the American Chemical Society (ACS), and later served on the national ACS board of directors.

== Retirement and death ==
Breslow retired in 1982. In 1988, he received the ACS Award in Applied Polymer Science. He died on May 26, 1995, at Christiana Hospital in Newark, Delaware.

== Personal life ==
Breslow married Ann Goodman after World War II. They had three children and lived in Brandywine Hundred outside Wilmington, Delaware. He was a member of Congregation Beth Shalom.

== Works ==
- Breslow, David S. (1966). The Chemistry of Heterocyclic Compounds: Multi-Sulfur and Sulfur and Oxygen Five- and Six-Membered Heterocycles. New York: Interscience Publishers. ISBN 978-0-470-38196-0.
