= N-Methyltaurine =

Identifiers
CAS Number	107-68-6
3D model (JSmol)	Interactive image
ChEMBL	ChEMBL3306207
ChemSpider	7594
ECHA InfoCard	100.003.192
EC Number	203-510-3
PubChem CID	7882
UNII	1X4943TG5W
CompTox Dashboard (EPA)	DTXSID4025664
- InChI: InChI=1S/C3H9NO3S/c1-4-2-3-8(5,6)7/h4H,2-3H2,1H3,(H,5,6,7) Key: SUZRRICLUFMAQD-UHFFFAOYSA-N
- SMILES: CNCCS(=O)(=O)O

Properties
Chemical formula	C_{3}H_{9}NO_{3}S
Molar mass	139.17 g·mol^{−1}

Hazards
- GHS labelling
Pictograms	(GHS05: Corrosive) (GHS07: Exclamation mark)
Signal word	Danger
Hazard statements	H314, H315, H319
Precautionary statements	P260, P264, P280, P301+P330+P331, P302+P352, P303+P361+P353, P304+P340, P305+P351+P338, P310, P321, P332+P313, P337+P313, P362, P363, P405, P501
- Except where otherwise noted, data are given for materials in their standard state (at 25 °C [77 °F], 100 kPa). Infobox references

N-Methyltaurine (2-methylaminoethanesulfonic acid) is an aminosulfonic acid which is present as a zwitterion in the crystalline state and in polar solvents (just like amino acids). In contrast to the widespread taurine, N-methyltaurine has been found in nature only in red algae, where it is formed by methylation of taurine. It is an important industrial chemical used in the production of taurates, which are used extensively as mild anionic surfactants.

== Preparation ==
The synthesis of N-methyltaurine was reported as early as 1878, with methylamine being reacted with the silver salt of 2-chloroethanesulfonic acid. An obvious modification for this reaction is the replacement of the silver salt of 2-chloroethanesulfonic acid by the sodium salt of 2-chloroethanesulfonic acid. The addition of methylamine to sodium vinylsulfonate in aqueous solution gives N-methyltaurine in 85% yield after acidification with acetic acid. The purification of the crude product and preparation of the N-methyltaurine can also be accomplished by passage of the sodium salt solution through a cation exchange resin in its H form and then through an anion exchange resin in its OH form. The reaction of sodium isethionate with methylamine in water at high temperature and pressure yields the sodium salt of N-methyltaurine

which yields pure N-methyltaurine upon saturation with CO_{2} and removal of the precipitated sodium bicarbonate.

== Properties ==
N-Methyltaurine is a white powdery solid which is readily soluble in water.

== Use ==
N-Methyltaurine (or its sodium salt) is used as a polar head group in surfactants from the class of taurates (Also called taurides, or acylaminoethanesulfonates). The Taurides are characterized by excellent foaming - even in the presence of oil and skin fats - and foam stability, with good skin compatibility and broad pH stability. The market breakthrough for N-methyltaurine as a hair restorer is still pending.
