= Isethionic acid =

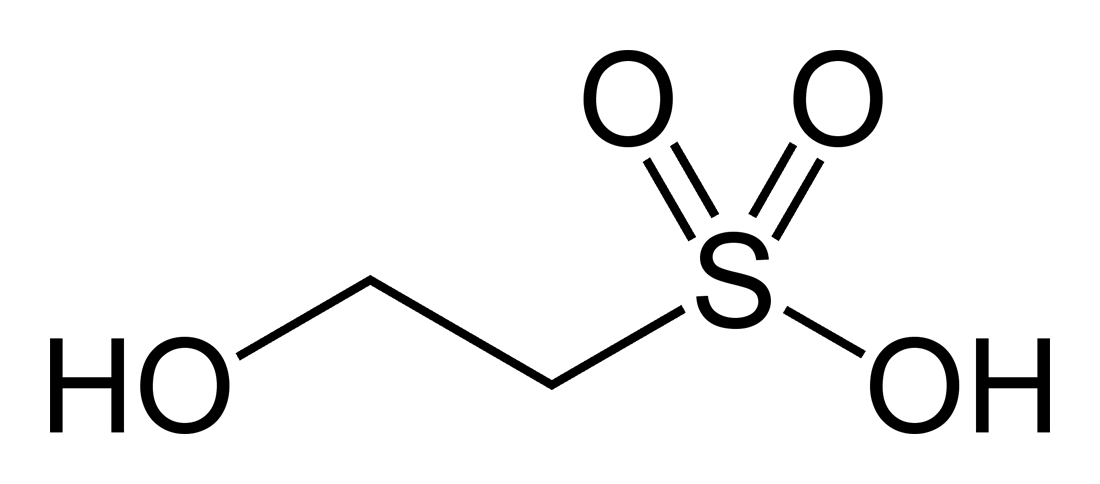
- Skeletal formula

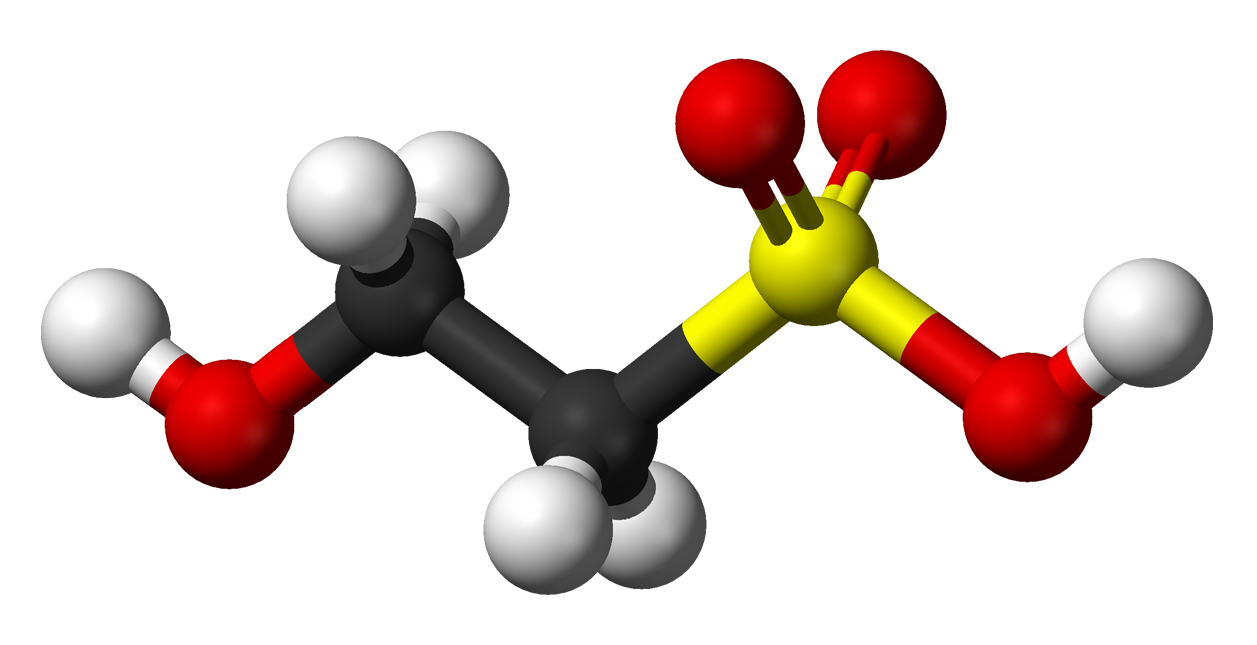
- ball-and-stick model Isethionic acid

Names
- Preferred IUPAC name 2-Hydroxyethane-1-sulfonic acid

Identifiers
CAS Number	107-36-8
3D model (JSmol)	Interactive image
ChEBI	CHEBI:1157
ChemSpider	7578
ECHA InfoCard	100.003.169
KEGG	C05123
PubChem CID	7866
UNII	97J3QN9884
CompTox Dashboard (EPA)	DTXSID1041427
- InChI: InChI=1S/C2H6O4S/c3-1-2-7(4,5)6/h3H,1-2H2,(H,4,5,6) Key: SUMDYPCJJOFFON-UHFFFAOYSA-N; InChI=1/C2H6O4S/c3-1-2-7(4,5)6/h3H,1-2H2,(H,4,5,6) Key: SUMDYPCJJOFFON-UHFFFAOYAO
- SMILES: O=S(=O)(O)CCO

Properties
Chemical formula	C_{2}H_{6}O_{4}S
Molar mass	126.13 g/mol
Density	1.63 g/cm^{3}
Acidity (pK_{a})	1.39 (predicted)
- Except where otherwise noted, data are given for materials in their standard state (at 25 °C [77 °F], 100 kPa). verify (what is ?) Infobox references

Isethionic acid is an organosulfur compound containing an alkylsulfonic acid located beta to a hydroxy group. Its discovery is generally attributed to Heinrich Gustav Magnus, who prepared it by the action of solid sulfur trioxide on ethanol in 1833. It is a white water-soluble solid used in the manufacture of certain surfactants and in the industrial production of taurine. It is most commonly available in the form of its sodium salt (sodium isethionate).

== Synthesis ==
The original synthesis of the compound, involving the reaction of sulfur trioxide with ethanol, has largely been replaced by more advanced methods. An alternative production method involves the hydrolysis of carbyl sulfate, which is derived from the sulfonation of ethylene.

However the most common route is the reaction of ethylene oxide with aqueous sodium bisulfite, which produces the sodium salt (sodium isethionate):

== Reactions ==
Isethionic acid is used as a starting material in the industrial production of taurine and N-methyltaurine.

Dehydration of isethionic acid gives vinylsulfonic acid.

=== Derivatives ===
Fatty acid esters of isethionic acid (such as sodium lauroyl isethionate and sodium cocoyl isethionate) are used as biodegradable anionic surfactants. These materials are much milder to skin that other sulfate based surfactants (i.e. sodium lauryl sulfate) making them popular for use in make-up, shampoos and detergent bars including those made by Dove.

Isethionic acid is also used as a counter ion in certain pharmaceutical formulations, including the antimicrobials hexamidine and pentamidine.

== Biological importance ==
Studies made on dog heart slices suggested that heart tissue may be capable of converting taurine to isethionic acid, further experiments demonstrated that this tissue may synthesize taurine from cystine.

== See also ==
- 1,3-Propane sultone
- Ethanedisulfonic acid
