= Α-Olefin sulfonate =

Class of chemical compounds

General chemical structure of α-olefin sulfonates R= Alkyl, M= Na^{+}, n = 1 or 2

α-Olefin sulfonates (also: alpha-olefin sulfonates or AOS) are a group of anionic surfactants, which are used as detergents. The compounds contain a - mostly linear, primary - alkyl R and a monovalent cation M, preferably sodium. The most frequently used example of this group of substances is sodium α-olefin sulfonate (INCI: Sodium C14-16 Olefin Sulfonate).

== Production and composition ==
α-Olefin sulfonates are produced by sulfonation of alpha-olefins, typically using sulfur trioxide. This reaction produces two groups of products: (1) allylic and homoallylic sulfonic acids and (2) 5- and 6-membered cyclic sulfate esters. Base hydrolysis of the mixture gives alkene sulfonates (derived from simple deprotonation of allylic and homoallylic sulfonic acids) and 3- and 4-hydroxyalkanesulfonates (derived from the cyclic sulfate esters). A typical mixture consists of 60-65% alkene sulfonates and 35-40% hydroxyalkane sulfonates. The commercially available olefin sulfonates are supplied as solutions containing about 40% active ingredient content.

== Description ==
In addition to a longer hydrocarbon chain in which there must be at least one double bond (hence the name "olefin"), it has an anionic sulfonate headgroup with a sodium ion as a counterion. The sulfonate group is negative in aqueous solution, which is why the α-olefin sulfonates are among the anionic surfactants. In contrast to most other surfactants in which the C_{12}-alkyl chains have the highest surface activity, olefin sulfonates shows maximal activity when using C_{14}and C_{16}-olefins.

== Usage ==
α-Olefin sulfonates with linear alkenyl radicals from C_{12} to C_{18} are used as anionic surfactants in various areas of application due to their pronounced foam formation and foam stability (even with high water hardness), excellent fat-dissolving power and oil dissolving power as well as a favorable ecological profile and low aquatic toxicity and human toxicity. They are typically used in detergents and cleaning agents, for degreasing, in the emulsion polymerization, the conditioning of concrete and mortar as well as in the formulation of pesticides.

Sodium C14-16 olefin sulfonate is being introduced in some shampoos as an alternative to sodium laureth sulfate. Some groups and sellers suggest that it is healthier, but this claim lacks evidence.
