= Reed reaction =

In chemistry

The Reed reaction is a chemical reaction that utilizes light to oxidize hydrocarbons to alkylsulfonyl chlorides. This reaction is employed in modifying polyethylene to give chlorosulfonated polyethylene (CSPE), which is noted for its toughness.

== Commercial implementations ==
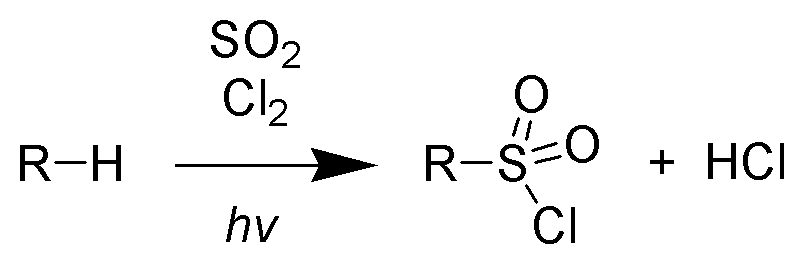
The Reed reaction

Polyethylene is treated with a mixture of chlorine and sulfur dioxide under UV-radiation. Vinylsulfonic acid can also be prepared beginning with the sulfochlorination of chloroethane. Dehydrohalogenation of the product gives vinylsulfonyl chloride, which subsequently is hydrolyzed to give vinylsulfonic acid:

ClCH_{2}CH_{3} + SO_{2} + Cl_{2} → ClCH_{2}CH_{2}SO_{2}Cl + HCl

ClCH_{2}CH_{2}SO_{2}Cl → H_{2}C=CHSO_{2}Cl + HCl

CH_{2}=CHSO_{2}Cl + H_{2}O → H_{2}C=CHSO_{3}H + HCl

== Mechanism ==
The reaction occurs via a free radical mechanism. UV-light initiates homolysis of chlorine, producing a pair of chlorine atoms:

Chain initiation:

$$\ce{Cl2 ->[h\nu] 2Cl.}$$

Thereafter a chlorine atom attacks the hydrocarbon chain, freeing hydrogen to form hydrogen chloride and an alkyl free radical. The resulting radical then captures SO_{2}. The resulting sulfonyl radical attacks another chlorine molecule to produce the desired sulfonyl chloride and a new chlorine atom, which continues the reaction chain. Chain propagation steps:

$$\ce{{R-H} + .Cl -> {R.} + HCl}$$
$$\ce{{R.} + {:}SO2 -> R-\dot{S}O2}$$
$$\ce{{R-\dot{S}O2} + Cl2 -> {R-SO2-Cl} + Cl.}$$

== See also ==
- Chain reaction

== Historical readings ==
- Reed, C. F. U.S. patent 2,046,090; U.S. patent 2,174,110; U.S. patent 2,174,492.
- Asinger, Friedrich; Schmidt, Walter; Ebeneder, Franz (1942). "Zur Kenntnis der Produkte der gemeinsamen Einwirkung von Schwefeldioxyd und Chlor auf aliphatische Kohlenwasserstoffe im ultravioletten Licht, I. Mitteil.: Die Produkte der gemeinsamen Einwirkung von Schwefeldioxyd und Chlor auf Propan in Tetrachlorkohlen". Berichte der Deutschen Chemischen Gesellschaft (A and B Series). 75: 34–41. doi:10.1002/cber.19420750105.
- Asinger, Friedrich; Ebeneder, Franz; Böck, Erich (1942). "Zur Kenntnis der Produkte der gemeinsamen Einwirkung von Schwefeldioxyd und Chlor auf aliphatische Kohlenwasserstoffe im ultravioletten Licht, II. Mitteil.: Die Produkte der gemeinsamen Einwirkung von Schwefeldioxyd und Chlor auf n-Butan in Tetrachlorkohl". Berichte der Deutschen Chemischen Gesellschaft (A and B Series). 75: 42–48. doi:10.1002/cber.19420750106.
- Asinger, Friedrich; Ebeneder, Franz (1942). "Zur Kenntnis der Produkte der gemeinsamen Einwirkung von Schwefeldioxyd und Chlor auf aliphatische Kohlenwasserstoffe im ultravioletten Licht, III. Mitteilung† : Über die Sulfochlorierung von Isobutan und die Isomerenbildung bei der Sulfochlorierung und Chlorierung gasförmiger Kohlenwasserstoffe". Berichte der Deutschen Chemischen Gesellschaft (A and B Series). 75 (4): 344–349. doi:10.1002/cber.19420750408. ISSN 1099-0682.
- Helberger, J. H.; Manecka, G.; Fischer, H. M. (1949). "Zur Kenntnis organischer Sulfonsäuren. II. Mitt.: Die Sulfochlorierung des 1-Chlorbutans und anderer Halogenalkyle; Synthese von Sultonen und eines Sultams". Justus Liebigs Annalen der Chemie. 562: 23–35. doi:10.1002/jlac.19495620104.
