= Precipitation polymerization =

Molecular reaction that creates polymers

IUPAC definition

Polymerization in which monomer(s), initiator(s) and colloid stabilizer(s)
are dissolved in a solvent and this continuous phase that is a nonsolvent for the
formed polymer beyond a critical molecular weight.

In polymer science, precipitation polymerization is a heterogeneous polymerization process that begins initially as a homogeneous system in the continuous phase, where the monomer and initiator are completely soluble, but upon initiation the formed polymer is insoluble and thus precipitates.

After precipitation, the polymerization proceeds by absorption of monomer and initiator into the polymer particles.

A distinction should be made between precipitation and dispersion polymerization, due to the similarities. A dispersion polymerization is actually a type of precipitation polymerization, but the difference lies in the fact that precipitation polymerizations give larger and less regular particles, as a result of little or no stabilizer present.
