= Sulfonic acid =

Organic compounds with the structure R–S(=O)2–OH

General structure of a sulfonic acid with the functional group indicated in blue

In organic chemistry, sulfonic acid (or sulphonic acid) refers to a member of the class of organosulfur compounds with the general formula R−S(=O)_{2}−OH, where R is an organic alkyl or aryl group and the S(=O)_{2}(OH) group a sulfonyl hydroxide. A sulfonic acid can be thought of as sulfuric acid with one hydroxyl group replaced by an organic substituent. The parent compound (with the organic substituent replaced by hydrogen) is the parent sulfonic acid, HS(=O)_{2}(OH), a tautomer of sulfurous acid, S(=O)(OH)_{2}. (Note: Neither the parent sulfonic acid nor the parent sulfurous acid have been isolated or even observed, although the monoanion of these hypothetical species exists in solution as an equilibrium mixture of tautomers: HS(=O)_{2}(O^{−}) ⇌ S(=O)(OH)(O^{−}).) Salts or esters of sulfonic acids are called sulfonates.

== Preparation ==
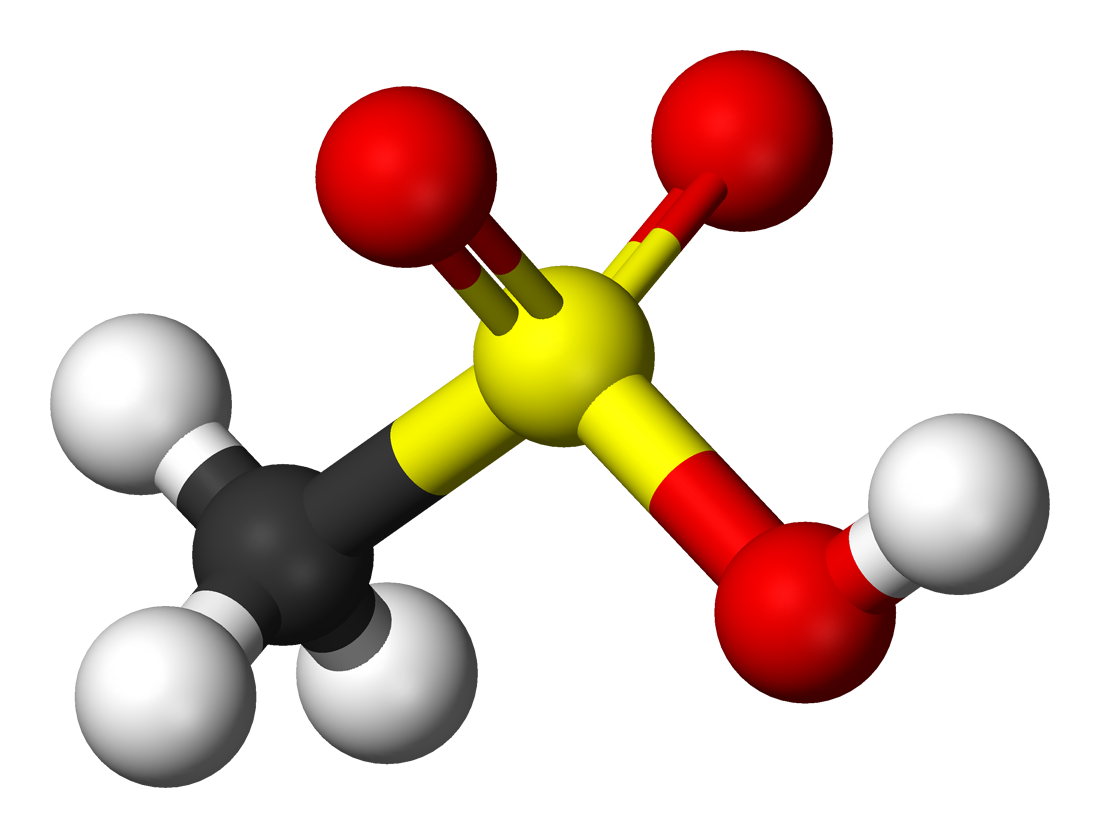
Ball-and-stick model of methanesulfonic acid.

Most sulfonic acids and, indirectly, most sulfonate salts are produced by treatment of organic compounds with sulfur trioxide. One large scale application of this method is the production of alkylbenzenesulfonic acids:

RC_{6}H_{5} + SO_{3} → RC_{6}H_{4}SO_{3}H

In this reaction, sulfur trioxide is an electrophile and the arene is the nucleophile. The reaction is an example of electrophilic aromatic substitution.

In a related process, terminal alkenes react with sulfur trioxide to give α-olefin sulfonic acids (and hydroxysulfonic acid):

RCH_{2}CH=CH_{2} + SO_{3} → RCH=CHCH_{2}SO_{3}H

Likewise, carboxylic acids react with sulfur trioxide to give the sulfonic acids.

A third large-scale industrial process starts simply with saturated hydrocarbons. Sulfoxidation, similar to the Reed reaction, irradiates a mixture of alkanes, sulfur dioxide and oxygen:

RH + SO_{2} + 1/_{2} O_{2} → RSO_{3}H

UV (or higher-energy) light is usually necessary, but titanium dioxide catalyzes the reaction with visible light. In accord with its free-radical mechanism, the reaction favors secondary positions and produces mixtures.

The direct reaction of alkanes with sulfur trioxide is used to convert methane to methanesulfonic and methanedisulfonic acids.

Sulfonic acids can be prepared by oxidation of thiols:

RSH + 3/_{2} O_{2} → RSO_{3}H

Typical oxidants include potassium permanganate, chlorine (followed by hydrolysis), and nitric acid The biosynthesis of taurine proceeds by oxidation of the thiol.

Alternatively, bisulfite adds as a nucleophile to terminal alkenes:

HSO^{−}_{3} + RCH=CH_{2} → RCH_{2}CH_{2}SO^{−}_{3}

Halides can also alkylate bisulfite directly:

HSO^{−}_{3} + RBr → RSO_{3}H + Br^{−}

=== Hydrolyses ===
Many sulfonic acids are prepared by hydrolysis of sulfonyl halides and related precursors. Thus, perfluorooctanesulfonic acid is prepared by hydrolysis of the sulfonyl fluoride, which in turn is generated by the electrofluorination of octanesulfonic acid. Similarly the sulfonyl chloride derived from polyethylene is hydrolyzed to the sulfonic acid. These sulfonyl chlorides are produced by free-radical reactions of chlorine, sulfur dioxide, and the hydrocarbons using the Reed reaction.

Vinylsulfonic acid is derived by hydrolysis of carbyl sulfate, (C_{2}H_{4}(SO_{3})_{2}), which in turn is obtained by the addition of sulfur trioxide to ethylene.

== Properties ==
Sulfonic acids are strong acids. They are around a million times stronger than the corresponding carboxylic acid. For example, p-Toluenesulfonic acid and methanesulfonic acid have pK_{a} values of −2.8 and −1.9, respectively, while those of benzoic acid and acetic acid are 4.20 and 4.76, respectively. The pK_{a} of methanesulfonic acid has been reported to be as high as −0.6 or as low as −6.5. Sulfonic acids are known to react with solid sodium chloride (salt) to form the sodium sulfonate and hydrogen chloride. This observation implies an acidity greater than that of HCl.

Because of their polarity, sulfonic acids tend to be crystalline solids or viscous, high-boiling liquids. They are also usually colourless and nonoxidizing, which makes them suitable for use as acid catalysts in organic reactions. Their polarity, in conjunction with their high acidity, renders short-chain sulfonic acids water-soluble, while longer-chain ones exhibit detergent-like properties.

The structure of sulfonic acids is illustrated by the prototype, methanesulfonic acid. The sulfonic acid group, RSO_{2}OH features a tetrahedral sulfur centre, meaning that sulfur is at the center of four atoms: three oxygens and one carbon. The overall geometry of the sulfur centre is reminiscent of the shape of sulfuric acid.

Representative sulfonic acids and sulfonates

PFOS, a surfactant and a controversial pollutant.

p-Toluenesulfonic acid, a widely used reagent in organic synthesis.

Nafion, a polymeric sulfonic acid useful in fuel cells.

== Applications ==
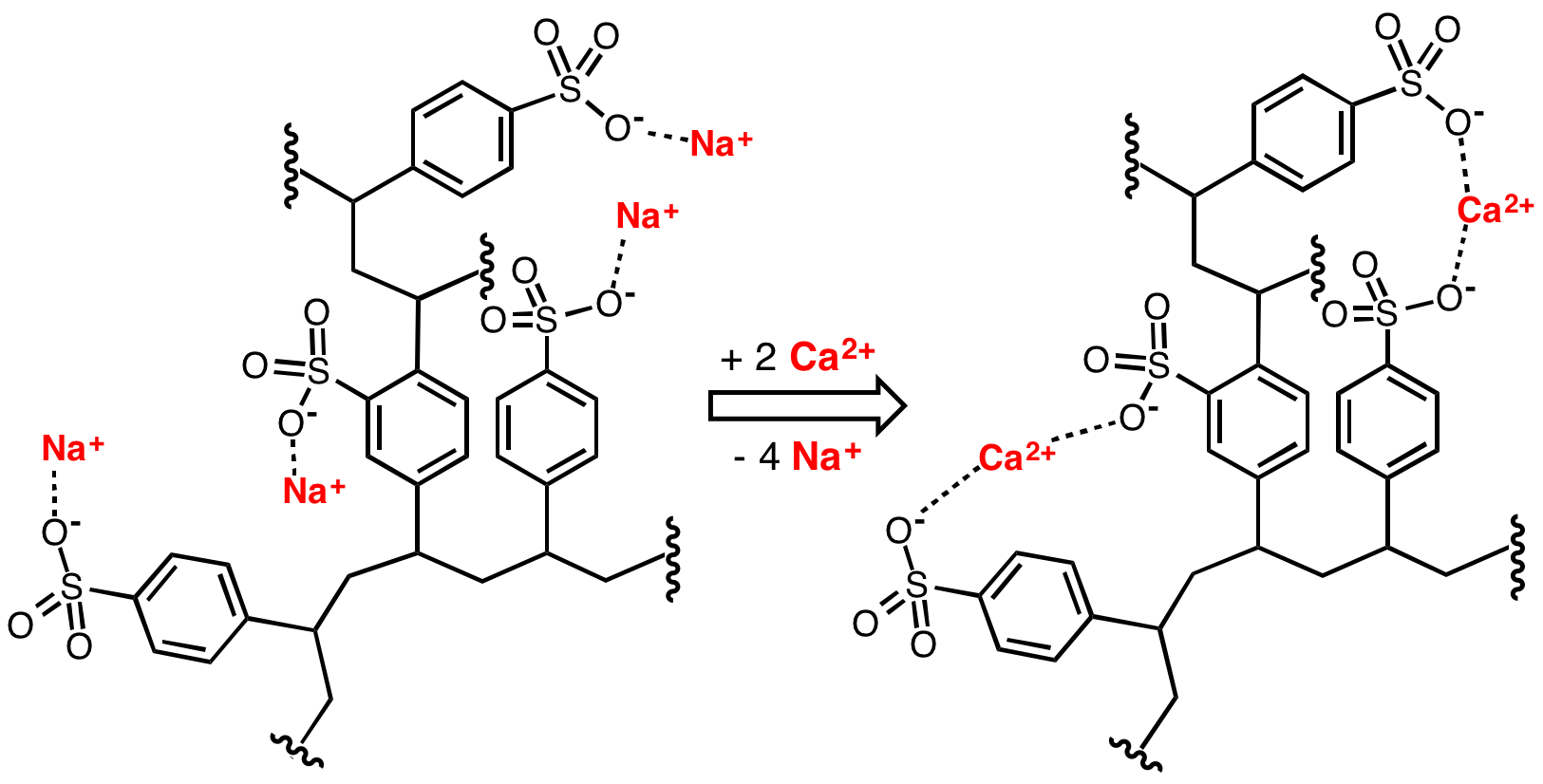
Sulfonates are the basis of most cation exchange membranes

Both alkyl and aryl sulfonic acids are known, most large-scale applications are associated with the aromatic derivatives. One primary application is as surfactants.

Often, e.g. for detergents, dyes,, and ion exchange resins (water softening), they are converted to the sulfonate salts, not the acid.

=== Acid catalysts ===
Being strong acids, sulfonic acids are also used as catalysts. The simplest examples are methanesulfonic acid, CH_{3}SO_{2}OH and p-toluenesulfonic acid, which are regularly used in organic chemistry as acids that are lipophilic (soluble in organic solvents). Polymeric sulfonic acids are also useful. Dowex resin are sulfonic acid derivatives of polystyrene and is used as catalysts and for ion exchange (water softening). Nafion, a fluorinated polymeric sulfonic acid is a component of proton exchange membranes in fuel cells.

=== Drugs ===
Sulfa drugs, a class of antibacterials, are produced from sulfonic acids.

== Reactions ==
The reactivity of the sulfonic acid group is extensive. Many reactions entail conversions first to the sulfonate salt.

=== Hydrolysis to phenols ===
Although strong, the (aryl)C−SO_{3}^{−} bond can be broken by nucleophilic reagents. Such conversions sometimes called alkaline fusion. Of historic and continuing significance is the α-sulfonation of anthraquinone followed by displacement of the sulfonate group by other nucleophiles, which cannot be installed directly. An early method for producing phenol involved the base hydrolysis of sodium benzenesulfonate, which can be generated readily from benzene.

C_{6}H_{5}SO_{3}Na + NaOH → C_{6}H_{5}OH + Na_{2}SO_{3}

The conditions for this reaction are harsh, however, requiring 'fused alkali' or molten sodium hydroxide at 350 °C for benzenesulfonic acid itself. Unlike the mechanism for the fused alkali hydrolysis of chlorobenzene, which proceeds through elimination-addition (benzyne mechanism), benzenesulfonic acid undergoes the analogous conversion by an S_{N}Ar mechanism, as revealed by a ^{14}C labeling, despite the lack of stabilizing substituents. Sulfonic acids with electron-withdrawing groups (e.g., with NO_{2} or CN substituents) undergo this transformation much more readily.

=== Hydrolytic desulfonation ===
Arylsulfonic acids are susceptible to hydrolysis, the reverse of the sulfonation reaction:

R−C_{6}H_{4}SO_{3}H + H_{2}O → R−C_{6}H_{5} + H_{2}SO_{4}

Whereas benzenesulfonic acid hydrolyzes above 200 °C, many derivatives are easier to hydrolyze. Thus, heating aryl sulfonic acids in aqueous acid produces the parent arene. This reaction is employed in several scenarios. In some cases the sulfonic acid serves as a water-solubilizing protecting group, as illustrated by the purification of para-xylene via its sulfonic acid derivative. In the synthesis of 2,6-dichlorophenol, phenol is converted to its 4-sulfonic acid derivative, which then selectively chlorinates at the positions flanking the phenol. Hydrolysis releases the sulfonic acid group.

=== Esterification ===
Sulfonic acids can be converted to esters. This class of organic compounds has the general formula R−SO_{2}−OR. Sulfonic esters such as methyl triflate are considered good alkylating agents in organic synthesis. Such sulfonate esters are often prepared by alcoholysis of the sulfonyl chlorides:

RSO_{2}Cl + R′OH → RSO_{2}OR′ + HCl

=== Halogenation ===
Sulfonyl halide groups (R−SO_{2}−X) are produced by chlorination of sulfonic acids using thionyl chloride. Sulfonyl fluorides can be produced by treating sulfonic acids with sulfur tetrafluoride:

SF_{4} + RSO_{3}H → SOF_{2} + RSO_{2}F + HF

=== o-Lithiation ===
Arylsulfonic acids react with two equiv of butyl lithium to give the ortho-lithio derivatives, i.e., ortho-lithiation. These dilithio sulfonates are suited for reactions with many electrophiles.
