= Sulfonyl halide =

Chemical group made of an –S(=O)_{2} group bound to a halogen

In chemistry, a sulfonyl halide consists of a sulfonyl (>S(=O)_{2}) group singly bonded to a halogen atom. They have the general formula RSO_{2}X, where X is a halogen. The stability of sulfonyl halides decreases in the order fluorides > chlorides > bromides > iodides, all four types being well known. The sulfonyl chlorides and fluorides are of dominant importance in this series.

Sulfonyl halides have tetrahedral sulfur centres attached to two oxygen atoms, an organic radical, and a halide. In a representative example, methanesulfonyl chloride, the S=O, S−C, and S−Cl bond distances are respectively 142.4, 176.3, and 204.6 pm.

== Sulfonyl chlorides ==
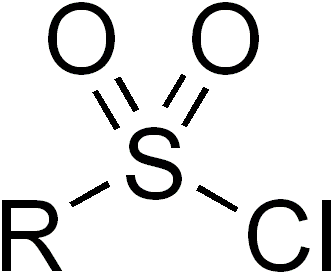
General structure of a sulfonic acid chloride

Sulfonic acid chlorides, or sulfonyl chlorides, are a sulfonyl halide with the general formula RSO_{2}Cl.

=== Production ===
Arylsulfonyl chlorides are made industrially in a two-step, one-pot reaction from an arene (in this case, benzene) and chlorosulfuric acid:

C_{6}H_{6} + HOSO_{2}Cl → C_{6}H_{5}SO_{3}H + HCl
C_{6}H_{5}SO_{3}H + HOSO_{2}Cl → C_{6}H_{5}SO_{2}Cl + H_{2}SO_{4}

The intermediate benzenesulfonic acid can be chlorinated with thionyl chloride as well. Benzenesulfonyl chloride, the most important sulfonyl halide, can also be produced by treating sodium benzenesulfonate with phosphorus pentachlorides.

Benzenediazonium chloride reacts with sulfur dioxide and copper(I) chloride to give the sulfonyl chloride:

[C_{6}H_{5}N_{2}]Cl + SO_{2} → C_{6}H_{5}SO_{2}Cl + N_{2}

For alkylsulfonyl chlorides, one synthetic procedure is the Reed reaction:

RH + SO_{2} + Cl_{2} → RSO_{2}Cl + HCl

=== Reactions ===
Sulfonyl chlorides react with water to give the corresponding sulfonic acid:

RSO_{2}Cl + H_{2}O → RSO_{3}H + HCl

These compounds react readily with many other nucleophiles as well, most notably alcohols and amines (see Hinsberg reaction). If the nucleophile is an alcohol, the product is a sulfonate ester; if it is an amine, the product is a sulfonamide:

RSO_{2}Cl + R'_{2}NH → RSO_{2}NR'_{2} + HCl

Treatment of alkanesulfonyl chlorides having α-hydrogens with amine bases can give sulfenes, highly unstable species that can be trapped:

RCH_{2}SO_{2}Cl → RCH=SO_{2} + HCl

The nucleophilic substitutions described above are straightforward addition-elimination reactions if R is aryl, but alkylsulfonyl chloride reagents react through a sulfene intermediate. Consequently α-quaternary sulfonyl chlorides are in fact poor sulfonylating reagents; tert-butyl sulfonyl chloride reacts as a source of tert-butyl cation and chlorosulfite.

Sulfonyl chlorides also react frequently as a source of RSO^{−}_{2} and Cl^{+}. For example benzenesulfonyl chloride chlorinates ketene acetals and mesyl chloride chlorinates para-xylene under Friedel-Crafts conditions. The desulfonation of arylsulfonyl chlorides provides a route to aryl chlorides:

ArSO_{2}Cl → ArCl + SO_{2}

1,2,4-Trichlorobenzene is made industrially in this way. Using sodium sulfite as the nucleophilic reagent, p-toluenesulfonyl chloride is converted to its sulfinate salt, CH_{3}C_{6}H_{4}SO_{2}Na. Chlorosulfonated alkanes are susceptible to crosslinking via reactions with various nucleophiles.

Sulfonyl chlorides readily undergo Friedel–Crafts reactions with arenes giving sulfones, for example:

RSO_{2}Cl + C_{6}H_{6} → RSO_{2}C_{6}H_{5} + HCl

Tetrathiotungstate ions (WS^{2−}_{4}) reduce sulfonyl chlorides to the disulfide.

=== Common sulfonyl chlorides ===
Chlorosulfonated polyethylene (CSPE) is produced industrially by chlorosulfonation of polyethylene. CSPE is noted for its toughness, hence its use for roofing shingles.

An industrially important derivative is benzenesulfonyl chloride. In the laboratory, useful reagents include tosyl chloride, brosyl chloride, nosyl chloride and mesyl chloride.

== Sulfonyl fluorides ==
Sulfonyl fluorides have the general formula RSO_{2}F. They can be produced by treating sulfonic acids with sulfur tetrafluoride:

SF_{4} + RSO_{3}H → SOF_{2} + RSO_{2}F + HF

Perfluorooctanesulfonyl derivatives, such as PFOS, are produced from their sulfonyl fluoride, which are produced by electrofluorination

In the molecular biology, sulfonyl fluorides are used to label proteins. They specifically react with serine, threonine, tyrosine, lysine, cysteine, and histidine residues. The fluorides are more resistant than the corresponding chlorides and are therefore better suited to this task.

Some sulfonyl fluorides can also be used as deoxyfluorinating reagents, such as 2-pyridinesulfonyl fluoride (PyFluor) and N-tosyl-4-chlorobenzenesulfonimidoyl fluoride (SulfoxFluor).

== Sulfonyl bromides ==
Sulfonyl bromides have the general formula RSO_{2}Br. In contrast to sulfonyl chlorides, sulfonyl bromides readily undergo light-induced homolysis affording sulfonyl radicals, which can add to alkenes, as illustrated by the use of bromomethanesulfonyl bromide, BrCH_{2}SO_{2}Br in Ramberg–Bäcklund reaction syntheses.

== Sulfonyl iodides ==
Sulfonyl iodides, having the general formula RSO_{2}I, are quite light-sensitive. Methanesulfonyl iodide evolves iodine in vacuum and branched-alkyl sulfonyl iodides are worse. Perfluoroalkanesulfonyl iodides, prepared by reaction between silver perfluoroalkanesulfinates and iodine in dichloromethane at −30 °C, react with alkenes to form the normal adducts, RFSO_{2}CH_{2}CHIR and the adducts resulting from loss of SO_{2}, RFCH_{2}CHIR.

Arenesulfonyl iodides, prepared from reaction of arenesulfinates or arenehydrazides with iodine, are much more stable and can initiate the synthesis of poly(methyl methacrylate) containing C–I, C–Br and C–Cl chain ends. Their reduction with silver gives the disulfone:

2 ArSO_{2}I + 2Ag → (ArSO_{2})_{2} + 2 AgI

== In popular culture ==
In the episode "Encyclopedia Galactica" of his TV series Cosmos: A Personal Voyage, Carl Sagan speculates that some intelligent extraterrestrial beings might have a genetic code based on polyaromatic sulfonyl halides instead of DNA.
