= Sulfonyl group =

Chemical group (>S(=O)2)

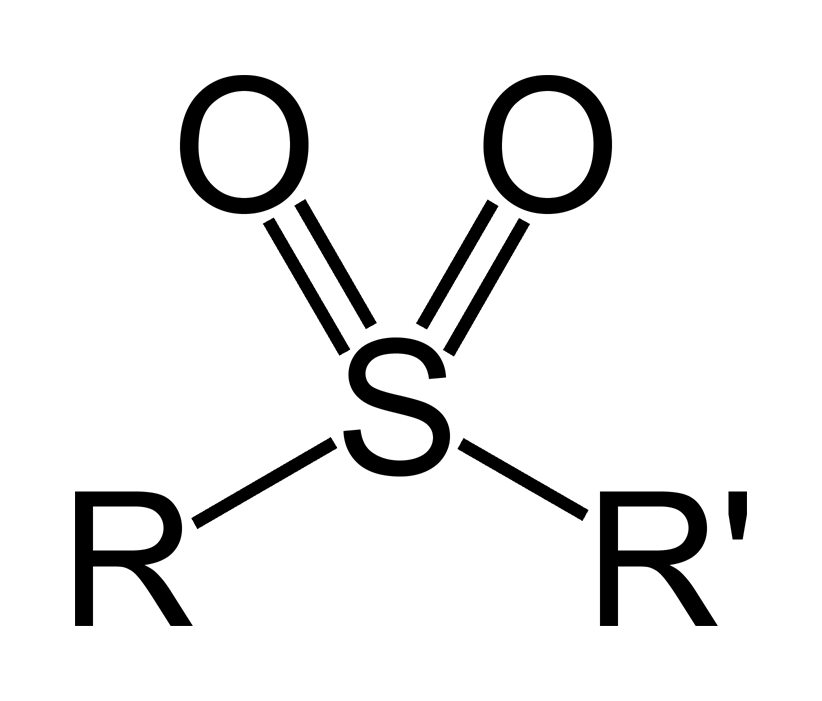
A sulfone. It consists of a sulfonyl group bonded with two organic substituents.

In organosulfur chemistry, a sulfonyl group is either a functional group found primarily in sulfones, or a substituent obtained from a sulfonic acid by the removal of the hydroxyl group, similarly to acyl groups.

== Group ==
Sulfonyl groups can be written as having the general formula R−S(=O)_{2}−R′, where there are two double bonds between the sulfur and oxygen.

Sulfonyl groups can be reduced to the sulfide with diisobutylaluminium hydride (DIBALH). Lithium aluminium hydride (LiAlH_{4}) reduces some but not all sulfones to sulfides.

In inorganic chemistry, when the group −S(=O)_{2}− is not connected to any carbon atoms, it is referred to as sulfuryl.

== Examples of sulfonyl group substituents ==
The names of sulfonyl groups typically end in -syl, such as:

Group name	Full name	Pseudoelement symbol	Example
Tosyl	p-toluenesulfonyl	Ts	Tosyl chloride (p-toluenesulfonyl chloride); CH_{3}C_{6}H_{4}SO_{2}Cl
Brosyl	p-bromobenzenesulfonyl	Bs	
Nosyl	o- or p-nitrobenzenesulfonyl	Ns	
Mesyl	methanesulfonyl	Ms	Mesyl chloride (methanesulfonyl chloride); CH_{3}SO_{2}Cl
Triflyl	trifluoromethanesulfonyl	Tf	
Tresyl	2,2,2-trifluoroethyl-1-sulfonyl		
Dansyl	5-(dimethylamino)naphthalene-1-sulfonyl	Ds	Dansyl chloride

== See also ==
- Fluorosulfonyl azide
- Sulfonyl halide
- Sulfonamide
- Sulfonate
- Methylsulfonylmethane (MSM)
