= Sematilide =

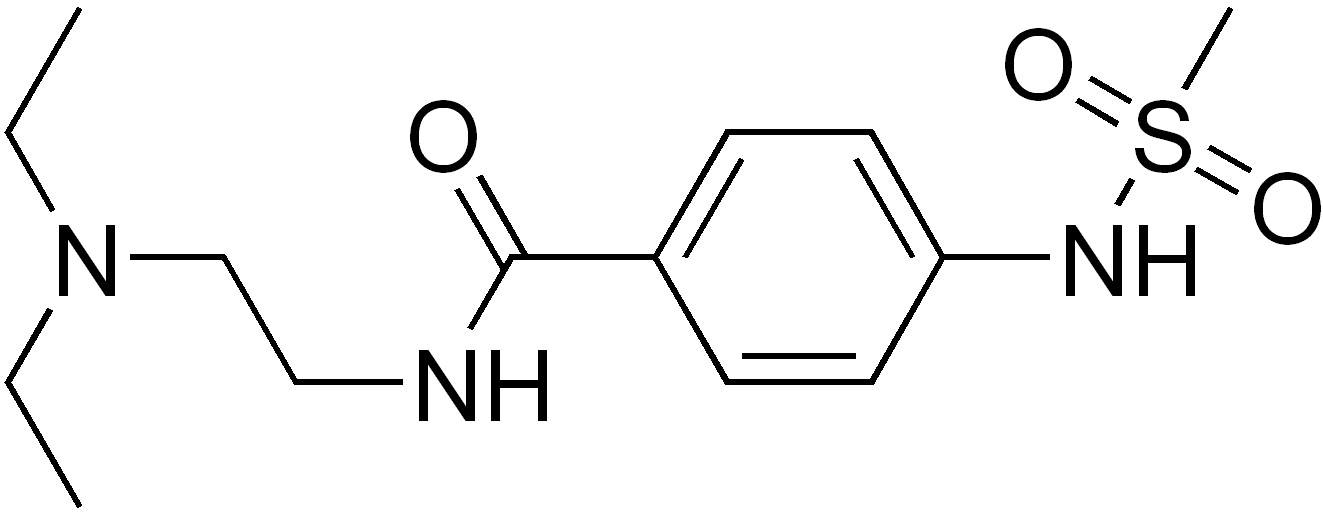

Names
- Preferred IUPAC name N-[2-(Diethylamino)ethyl]-4-(methanesulfonamido)benzamide

Identifiers
CAS Number	101526-83-4; 101526-62-9 (HCl)
3D model (JSmol)	Interactive image
ChEMBL	ChEMBL95804
ChemSpider	52715
MeSH	Sematilide
PubChem CID	58505
UNII	0NHB13IN3R; 1B8MC21ZI2 (HCl)
CompTox Dashboard (EPA)	DTXSID0058720
- InChI: InChI=1S/C14H23N3O3S/c1-4-17(5-2)11-10-15-14(18)12-6-8-13(9-7-12)16-21(3,19)20/h6-9,16H,4-5,10-11H2,1-3H3,(H,15,18) Key: KHYPYQZQJSBPIX-UHFFFAOYSA-N; InChI=1/C14H23N3O3S/c1-4-17(5-2)11-10-15-14(18)12-6-8-13(9-7-12)16-21(3,19)20/h6-9,16H,4-5,10-11H2,1-3H3,(H,15,18) Key: KHYPYQZQJSBPIX-UHFFFAOYAU
- SMILES: O=S(=O)(Nc1ccc(cc1)C(=O)NCCN(CC)CC)C

Properties
Chemical formula	C_{14}H_{23}N_{3}O_{3}S
Molar mass	313.42 g/mol
- Except where otherwise noted, data are given for materials in their standard state (at 25 °C [77 °F], 100 kPa). verify (what is ?) Infobox references

Sematilide is an antiarrhythmic agent. It is the same structure as for procainamide, differing only by the placement of a mesyl sulfonamide moiety to the anilino nitrogen.

== Synthesis ==
Synthesis of sematilide

Sematilide can be synthesized from benzocaine (1). Reaction with mesyl chloride, followed by saponification and removal of the water from the reaction mixture, gives sodium 4-[(methylsulfonyl)amino]benzoate (2). Chlorination with thionyl chloride gives 4-[(methylsulfonyl)amino]benzoyl chloride. Amide formation with N,N-diethylethylenediamine (3) then concludes the synthesis of sematilide (4).
