= Sulfuryl =

Inorganic chemical group (>S(=O)2)

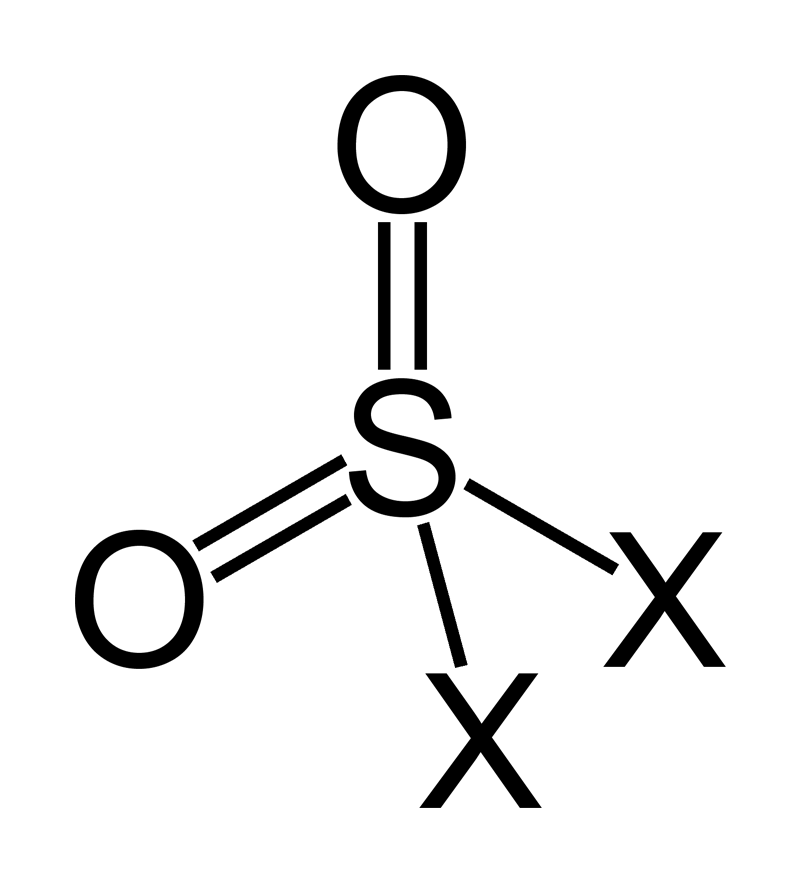
The structure of the sulfuryl group

In inorganic chemistry, the sulfuryl group is a functional group consisting of a sulfur atom covalently bound to two oxygen atoms (S(=O)_{2}X_{2}).

It occurs in compounds such as sulfuryl chloride, SO_{2}Cl_{2} and sulfuryl fluoride, SO_{2}F_{2}.

In organic chemistry, this group is found in sulfones (RSO_{2}R′) and sulfonyl halides (RSO_{2}X), where it is called the sulfonyl group.

== See also ==
- Thionyl
