= Methanesulfonamide =

Identifiers
CAS Number	3144-09-0
3D model (JSmol)	Interactive image
ChEMBL	ChEMBL305268
ChemSpider	65711
ECHA InfoCard	100.019.594
EC Number	221-553-6
PubChem CID	72879
UNII	98YB2P6NHR
CompTox Dashboard (EPA)	DTXSID3062865
- InChI: InChI=1S/CH5NO2S/c1-5(2,3)4/h1H3,(H2,2,3,4) Key: HNQIVZYLYMDVSB-UHFFFAOYSA-N
- SMILES: CS(=O)(=O)N

Properties
Chemical formula	CH_{5}NO_{2}S
Molar mass	95.12 g·mol^{−1}

Hazards
- GHS labelling
Pictograms	(GHS07: Exclamation mark)
Signal word	Warning
Hazard statements	H315, H319, H335
Precautionary statements	P261, P264, P264+P265, P271, P280, P302+P352, P304+P340, P305+P351+P338, P319, P321, P332+P317, P337+P317, P362+P364, P403+P233, P405, P501
- Except where otherwise noted, data are given for materials in their standard state (at 25 °C [77 °F], 100 kPa). Infobox references

Methanesulfonamide is a chemical compound and the simplest representative of the substance group of sulfonamides.

== Preparation and synthesis ==
Methanesulfonamide is prepared by reacting methanesulfonyl chloride with ammonia. Alternatively, the compound can be obtained by reacting the magnesium salt of methanesulfonic acid with hydroxylamine-O-sulfonic acid or by reduction (here: the Staudinger reaction) of methanesulfonyl azide with triphenylphosphine in methanol.

== Properties ==
From a solution of methanesulfonamide in heptane, single crystals of the compound are obtained as semi-transparent, white tablets. X-ray structure analysis yields an O–S–O valence angle of 119°, which deviates significantly from the tetrahedral angle of 109.47°. At 161 picometers, the sulfur–nitrogen bond length is significantly shorter than that of a typical single bond (173 picometers) and corresponds to the shortened bond length observed in other sulfonamides. This is presumably caused by a coordinative bond between the lone pair of the amino group and the atomic orbital of the sulfur atom.

== Use ==
Various reagents for chemical syntheses can be produced from methanesulfonamide. For example, methanesulfonamide 1, p-toluenesulfonic acid 2 and 1,1-dimethoxy-2-(methylthio)ethane 3 yield N-(2-methylthio-1-p-toluenesufonylethyl)methanesulfonamide 4, a key compound in the synthesis of symmetrically substituted porphyrins.

In Sharpless dihydroxylation, the oxidation of olefins with potassium hexacyanidoferrate(III) and osmium(VIII) oxide to cis-vicinal-diols, methanesulfonamide acts as a catalyst in the final hydrolysis step during protonation of the osmium intermediate.
