= Sodium p-toluenesulfonate =

Identifiers
CAS Number	657-84-1
3D model (JSmol)	Interactive image
ChEMBL	ChEMBL3186382
ChemSpider	12090
ECHA InfoCard	100.010.476
EC Number	211-522-5; 235-088-1
PubChem CID	3720192
RTECS number	XT7350000
UNII	2V179P6Q43
CompTox Dashboard (EPA)	DTXSID9042415
- InChI: InChI=1S/C7H8O3S.Na/c1-6-2-4-7(5-3-6)11(8,9)10;/h2-5H,1H3,(H,8,9,10);/q;+1/p-1 Key: KVCGISUBCHHTDD-UHFFFAOYSA-M
- SMILES: CC1=CC=C(C=C1)S(=O)(=O)[O-].[Na+]

Properties
Chemical formula	C_{7}H_{7}NaO_{3}S
Molar mass	194.18 g·mol^{−1}
Appearance	white solid

Hazards
- GHS labelling
Pictograms	(GHS05: Corrosive) (GHS07: Exclamation mark)
Signal word	Danger
Hazard statements	H315, H318, H319
Precautionary statements	P264, P264+P265, P280, P302+P352, P305+P351+P338, P305+P354+P338, P317, P321, P332+P317, P337+P317, P362+P364
- Except where otherwise noted, data are given for materials in their standard state (at 25 °C [77 °F], 100 kPa). Infobox references

Sodium p-toluenesulfonate is an organic compound with the formula CH_{3}C_{6}H_{4}SO_{3}Na. It is white, water-soluble solid. It is produced by the neutralization toluenesulfonic acid with sodium hydroxide. It is also a common product from the reactions of sodium-based reagents with toluenesulfonates.

Heating this salt in strong base results in desulfonation, giving, after acid workup, p-cresol.
