= Methanesulfonate monooxygenase =

Class of enzymes

Identifiers
- EC no.: 1.14.13.111

Databases
- BRENDA: enzyme data
- ExPASy: NiceZyme view
- KEGG: enzyme entry
- MetaCyc: metabolic pathway
- Rhea: reactions
- PDB structures: RCSB PDB PDBe PDBsum
Search
- PMC: articles
- PubMed: articles
- NCBI: proteins

Methanesulfonate monooxygenase (EC 1.14.13.111, mesylate monooxygenase, mesylate, reduced-FMN:oxygen oxidoreductase, MsmABCD, methanesulfonic acid monooxygenase, MSA monooxygenase, MSAMO) is an enzyme with systematic name methanesulfonate, NADH:oxygen oxidoreductase. This enzyme catalyses the following chemical reaction

methanesulfonate + NADH + H^{+} + O_{2} $\rightleftharpoons$ formaldehyde + NAD^{+} + sulfite + H_{2}O

Methanesulfonate monooxygenase is a flavoprotein.
