= Thionyl group =

Functional group consisting of sulfur double-bonded to oxygen

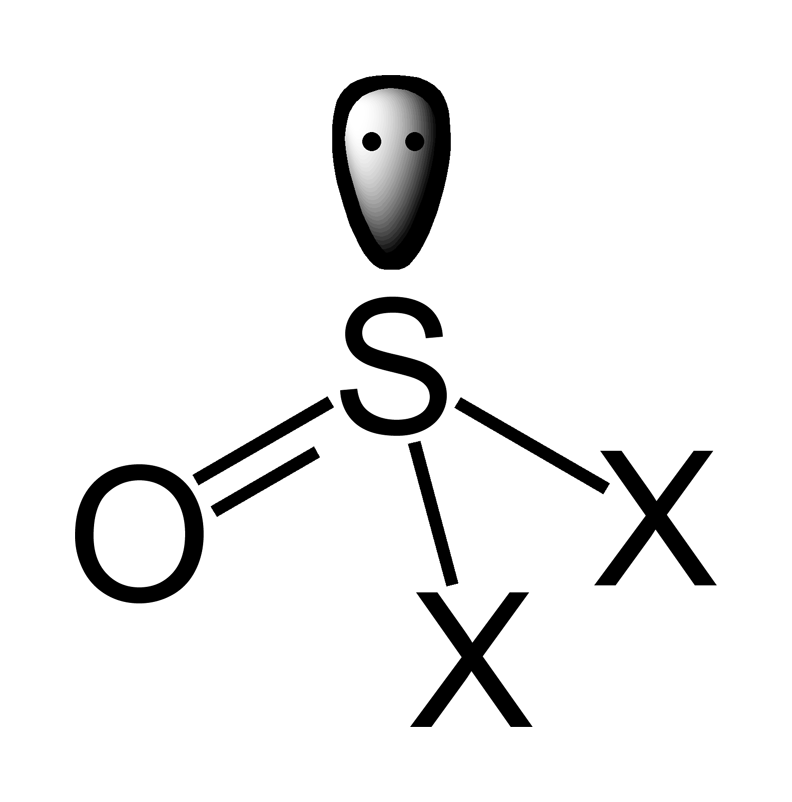
The structure of the thionyl group

The thionyl group is SO, a sulfur atom plus an oxygen atom.

It occurs in compounds such as thionyl fluoride, SOF_{2}.

Thionyl chloride, SOCl_{2}, is a common reagent used in organic synthesis to convert carboxylic acids to acyl chlorides.

In organic chemistry, the thionyl group is known as a sulfoxide group or sulfinyl group, and has the general structure RS(=O)R'. In the context of acid-base reactions, it may also be referred to as a sulfinyl group (i.e. sulfinylamines).

== See also ==
- Sulfuryl
