= P-Toluenesulfonyl hydrazide =

p-Toluenesulfonyl hydrazide
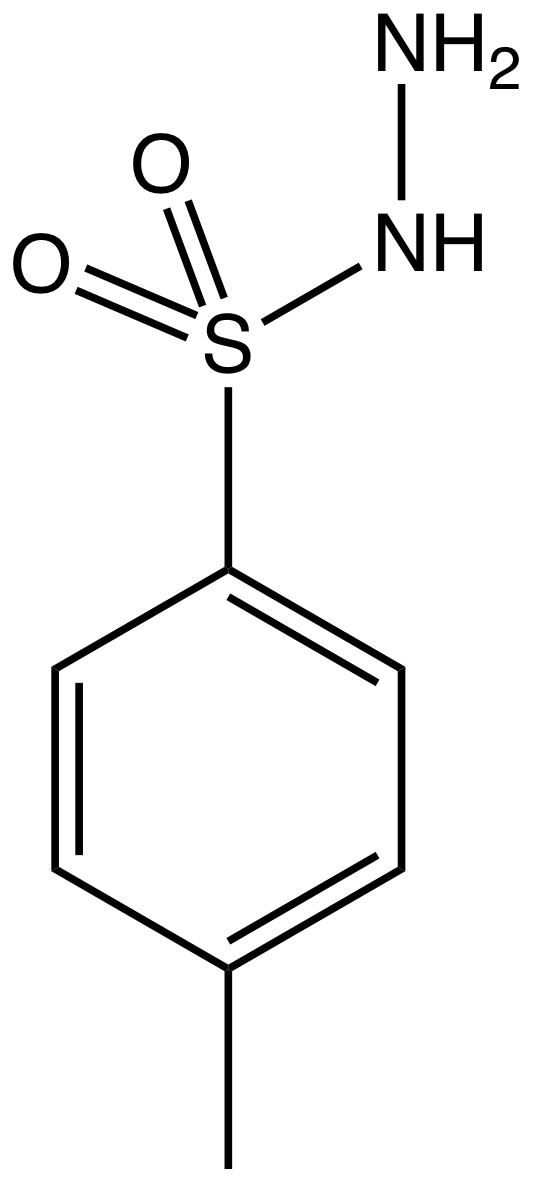

Names
- IUPAC name 4-methylbenzenesulfonohydrazide
- Other names tosyl hydrazide

Identifiers
CAS Number	1576-35-8
3D model (JSmol)	Interactive image
ChEMBL	ChEMBL221182
ChemSpider	14566
ECHA InfoCard	100.014.917
EC Number	216-407-3
PubChem CID	15303
UNII	LR93R5002M
CompTox Dashboard (EPA)	DTXSID8051756
- InChI: InChI=1S/C7H10N2O2S/c1-6-2-4-7(5-3-6)12(10,11)9-8/h2-5,9H,8H2,1H3 Key: ICGLPKIVTVWCFT-UHFFFAOYSA-N
- SMILES: CC1=CC=C(C=C1)S(=O)(=O)NN

Properties
Chemical formula	C_{7}H_{10}N_{2}O_{2}S
Molar mass	186.23 g·mol^{−1}
Appearance	White solid
Melting point	108–110 °C (226–230 °F; 381–383 K)

Hazards
- GHS labelling
Pictograms	(GHS02: Flammable) (GHS06: Toxic) (GHS07: Exclamation mark) (GHS08: Health hazard) (GHS09: Environmental hazard)
Signal word	Danger
Hazard statements	H242, H301, H302, H315, H317, H319, H341, H373, H410
Precautionary statements	P201, P202, P210, P220, P234, P260, P264, P270, P272, P273, P280, P281, P301+P310, P301+P312, P302+P352, P305+P351+P338, P308+P313, P314, P321, P330, P332+P313, P333+P313, P337+P313, P362, P363, P370+P378, P391, P403+P235, P405, P411, P420, P501
- Except where otherwise noted, data are given for materials in their standard state (at 25 °C [77 °F], 100 kPa). Infobox references

p-Toluenesulfonyl hydrazide is the organic compound with the formula CH_{3}C_{6}H_{4}SO_{2}NHNH_{2}. It is a white solid that is soluble in many organic solvents but not water or alkanes. It is a reagent in organic synthesis.

== Synthesis ==
Toluenesulfonyl hydrazide is prepared by the reaction of toluenesulfonyl chloride with hydrazine:

== Reactions ==
Tosylhydrazides can be installed by nucleophilic attack and later removed by base. It thus provides a way to convert C-Cl to C-H.

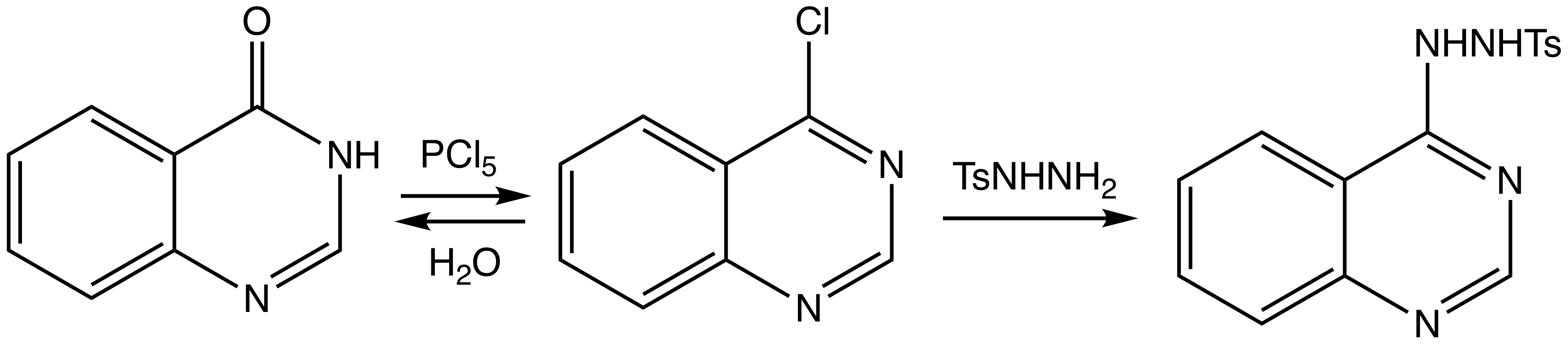
Preparation of 4-chloroquinazoline and conversion a tosylhydrazide by nucleophilic attack

With ketones and aldehydes, it condenses to give the hydrazones:

CH_{3}C_{6}H_{4}SO_{2}NHNH_{2} + R_{2}C=O → CH_{3}C_{6}H_{4}SO_{2}NHN=CR_{2} + H_{2}O

Upon heating in solution, it degrades, releasing diimide (N_{2}H_{2}), a useful reducing agent. Triisopropylbenzenesulfonylhydrazide is far more useful for this reaction.

== Use ==
The compound is an important reagent in organic synthesis, serving as a source of reactive diimide and its subsequent chemical reactions. It condenses with ketones and aldehydes to form hydrazones, which can be further transformed into reactive intermediates such as diazo compounds or carbenes. N-Heterocycles can be synthesized through 1,3-dipolar cycloaddition reactions. Ketone hydrazones are defunctionalized using mild reagents in a modified Wolff-Kishner reaction. A notable commercial application of this compound is as a foaming reagent for polymers.
