= Tosyl group =

Chemical group (–SO2–C6H4–CH3)

Tosyl group (blue) with a generic "R" group attached

Tosylate group with a generic "R" group attached. Note the extra oxygen, compared to plain tosyl.

In organic chemistry, a toluenesulfonyl group (tosyl group, abbreviated Ts or Tos (Note: In this article, "Ts", unless otherwise stated, means tosyl, not tennessine.)) is a univalent functional group with the chemical formula −SO_{2}−C_{6}H_{4}−CH_{3}. It consists of a tolyl group, −C_{6}H_{4}−CH_{3}, joined to a sulfonyl group, −SO_{2}−, with the open valence on sulfur. This group is usually derived from the compound tosyl chloride, CH_{3}C_{6}H_{4}SO_{2}Cl (abbreviated TsCl), which forms esters and amides of toluenesulfonic acid, CH_{3}C_{6}H_{4}SO_{2}OH (abbreviated TsOH). The para orientation illustrated (p-toluenesulfonyl) is most common, and by convention tosyl without a prefix refers to the p-toluenesulfonyl group.

The tosyl terminology was proposed by German chemists Kurt Hess and Robert Pfleger in 1933 on the pattern of trityl and adopted in English starting from 1934.

The toluenesulfonate (or tosylate) group refers to the −O−SO_{2}C_{6}H_{4}CH_{3} (–OTs) group, with an additional oxygen attached to sulfur and open valence on an oxygen. In a chemical name, the term tosylate may either refer to the salts containing the anion of p-toluenesulfonic acid, TsO^{−}M^{+} (e.g., sodium p-toluenesulfonate), or it may refer to esters of p-toluenesulfonic acid, TsOR (R = organyl group).

== Applications ==
For S_{N}2 reactions, alkyl alcohols can also be converted to alkyl tosylates, often through addition of tosyl chloride. In this reaction, the lone pair of the alcohol oxygen attacks the sulfur of the tosyl chloride, displacing the chloride and forming the tosylate with retention of reactant stereochemistry. This is useful because alcohols are poor leaving groups in S_{N}2 reactions, in contrast to the tosylate group. It is the transformation of alkyl alcohols to alkyl tosylates that allows an S_{N}2 reaction to occur in the presence of a good nucleophile.

A tosyl group can function as a protecting group in organic synthesis. Phenols can be converted to tosylate groups so that they do not react. The tosylate group may later be converted back into the phenol. The use of these functional groups is exemplified in organic synthesis of the drug tolterodine, wherein one of the steps a phenol group is protected as its tosylate and the primary alcohol as its nosylate. The latter is a leaving group for displacement by diisopropylamine: (Note: Reaction sequence: organic reduction of ethyl benzoylacetate by sodium borohydride to a diol, followed by Friedel-Crafts alkylation with p-cresol and iron(III) chloride to a phenol. The tosyl and nosyl groups are introduced as their respective chlorides with either sodium hydroxide or triethylamine as a base. The next step is nucleophilic displacement of the nosyl group by diisopropylamine, the remaining tosyl group is removed by another round of NaOH. Not shown: optical resolution by L-tartaric acid to optically pure (R)-isomer)

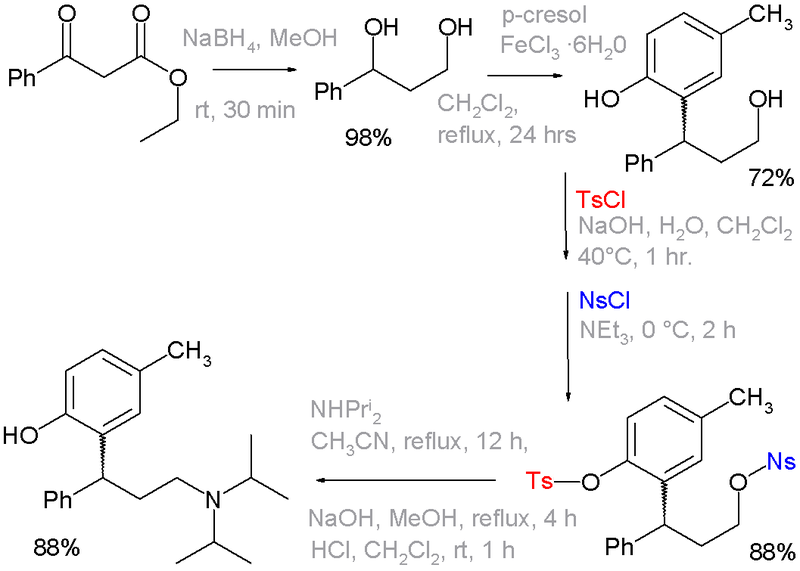

The tosyl group is also useful as a protecting group for amines. The resulting sulfonamide structure is extremely stable. It can be deprotected to reveal the amine using reductive or strongly acidic conditions.

== Amine protection – tosyl (Ts) ==
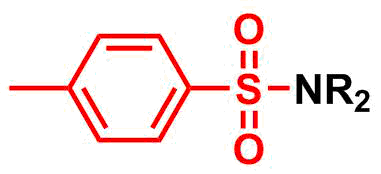
A tosylamide (toluenesulfonamide)

Tosyl (Ts) group is commonly used as a protecting group for amines in organic synthesis.

=== Most common amine protection methods ===
- Tosyl chloride and pyridine in dichloromethane

=== Most common amine deprotection methods ===
- HBr and acetic acid at 70 °C
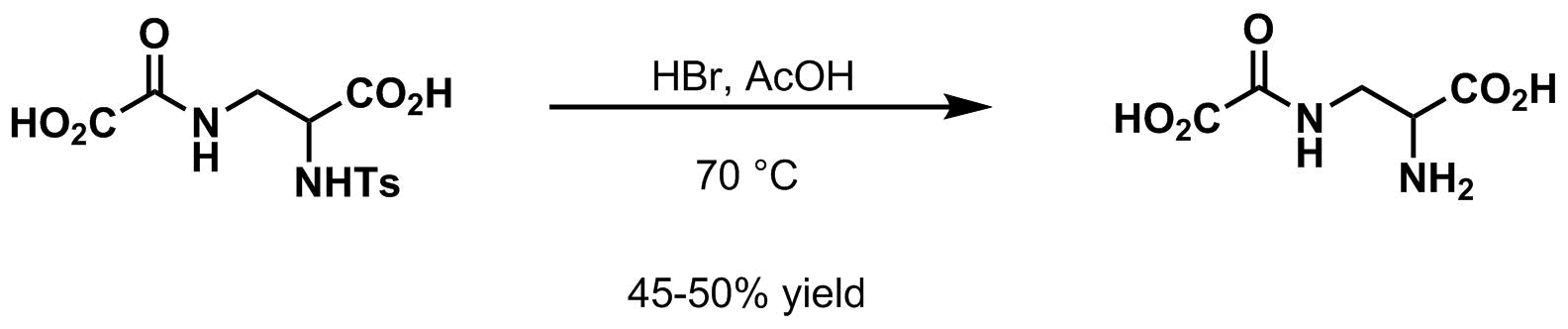
- Refluxing with TMSCl, sodium iodide and acetonitrile
- Reduction with SmI_{2}
- Reduction with Red-Al

== Related compounds ==
Closely related to the tosylates are the nosylates and brosylates, which are the abbreviated names for o- or p-nitrobenzenesulfonates and p-bromobenzenesulfonates, respectively.

== See also ==
- Tosylic acid
- Sulfonyl group
