= 4-Toluenesulfonyl chloride =

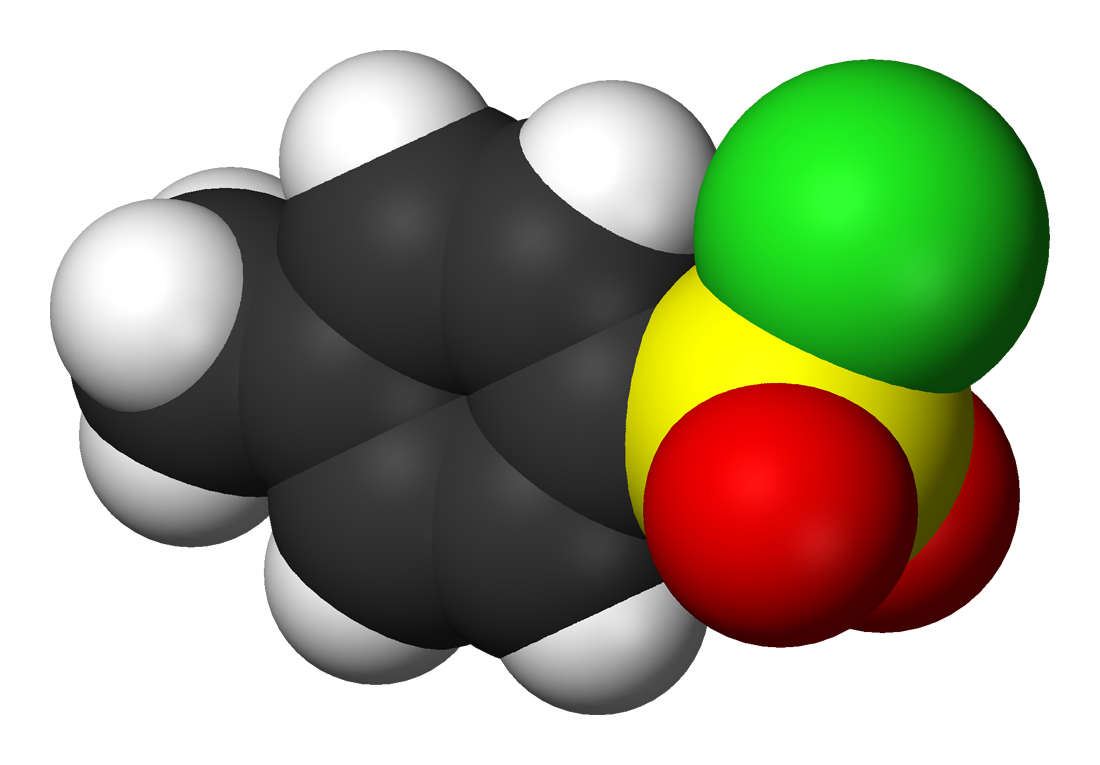

Names
- Preferred IUPAC name 4-Methylbenzene-1-sulfonyl chloride
- Other names Tosyl chloride, p-toluenesulfonyl chloride, p-TsCl, TsCl

Identifiers
CAS Number	98-59-9
3D model (JSmol)	Interactive image
ChemSpider	7119
ECHA InfoCard	100.002.441
PubChem CID	7397
UNII	027KYN78B4
CompTox Dashboard (EPA)	DTXSID1052660
- InChI: InChI=1S/C7H7ClO2S/c1-6-2-4-7(5-3-6)11(8,9)10/h2-5H,1H3 Key: YYROPELSRYBVMQ-UHFFFAOYSA-N; InChI=1/C7H7ClO2S/c1-6-2-4-7(5-3-6)11(8,9)10/h2-5H,1H3 Key: YYROPELSRYBVMQ-UHFFFAOYAN
- SMILES: O=S(Cl)(=O)c1ccc(cc1)C

Properties
Chemical formula	C_{7}H_{7}ClO_{2}S
Molar mass	190.65 g/mol
Appearance	White solid
Melting point	65 to 69 °C (149 to 156 °F; 338 to 342 K)
Boiling point	134 °C (273 °F; 407 K) at 10 mmHg
Solubility in water	Reacts with water

Hazards
- Occupational safety and health (OHS/OSH)
Main hazards	Releases HCl on contact with water
NFPA 704 (fire diamond)	3 1 0
Flash point	128 °C (262 °F; 401 K)
- Except where otherwise noted, data are given for materials in their standard state (at 25 °C [77 °F], 100 kPa). verify (what is ?) Infobox references

4-Toluenesulfonyl chloride (p-toluenesulfonyl chloride, toluene-p-sulfonyl chloride) is an organic compound with the formula CH_{3}C_{6}H_{4}SO_{2}Cl. This white, malodorous solid is a reagent widely used in organic synthesis. Abbreviated TsCl or TosCl, it is a derivative of toluene and contains a sulfonyl chloride (−SO_{2}Cl) functional group.

== Uses ==
As typical for Sulfonyl halides, TsCl converts alcohols (abbreviated ROH) into the corresponding toluenesulfonate esters, or tosyl derivatives ("tosylates"):

CH_{3}C_{6}H_{4}SO_{2}Cl + ROH → CH_{3}C_{6}H_{4}SO_{2}OR + HCl

Tosylates can be cleaved with lithium aluminium hydride:

4 CH_{3}C_{6}H_{4}SO_{2}OR + LiAlH_{4} → LiAl(O_{3}SC_{6}H_{4}CH_{3})_{4} + 4 RH

Thus, tosylation followed by reduction allows for removal of a hydroxyl group.

Likewise, TsCl is used to prepare sulfonamides from amines:

CH_{3}C_{6}H_{4}SO_{2}Cl + R_{2}NH → CH_{3}C_{6}H_{4}SO_{2}NR_{2} + HCl

The resulting sulfonamides are non-basic and, when derived from primary amines, are even acidic.

TsCl reacts with hydrazine to give p-toluenesulfonyl hydrazide.

The preparation of tosyl esters and amides are conducted in the presence of a base, which absorbs hydrogen chloride. The selection of the base is often crucial to the efficiency of tosylation. Typical bases include pyridine and triethylamine. Unusual bases are also used; for example, catalytic amounts of trimethylammonium chloride in the presence of triethylamine is highly effective by virtue of the trimethylamine.

== Other reactions ==
Being a widely available reagent, TsCl has been heavily examined from the perspective of reactivity. It is used in dehydrations to make nitriles, isocyanides and diimides. In an unusual reaction focusing on the sulfur center, zinc reduces TsCl to the sulfinate, CH_{3}C_{6}H_{4}SO_{2}Na.

== Manufacture ==
This reagent is inexpensively available for laboratory use. It is a by-product from the production of ortho-toluenesulfonyl chloride (a precursor for the synthesis of the common food additive and catalyst saccharin), via the chlorosulfonation of toluene:

CH_{3}C_{6}H_{5} + SO_{2}Cl_{2} → CH_{3}C_{6}H_{4}SO_{2}Cl + HCl

== Hazards ==
Tosyl chloride is "a corrosive lachrymator."
