= Methanesulfonyl fluoride =

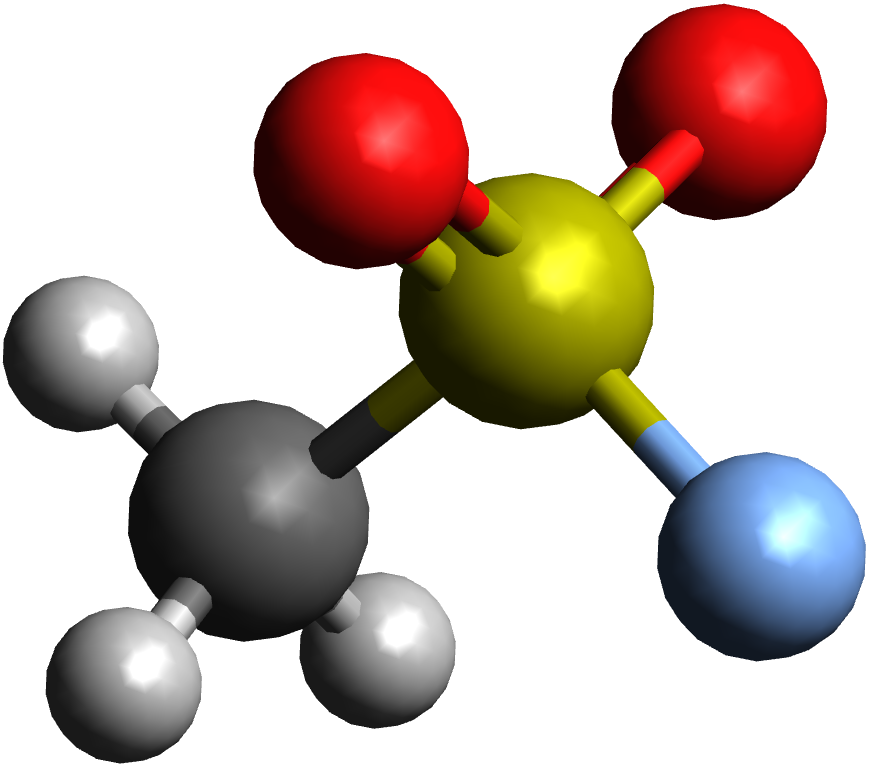

Names
- Preferred IUPAC name Methanesulfonyl fluoride
- Other names Fumette, Mesyl fluoride

Identifiers
| CAS Number | 558-25-8 |
| 3D model (JSmol) | Interactive image |
| Abbreviations | MSF; MsF |
| ChemSpider | 10734 |
| ECHA InfoCard | 100.008.358 |
| EC Number | 209-192-2 |
| MeSH | methanesulfonyl+fluoride |
| PubChem CID | 11207 |
| RTECS number | PB2975000 |
| UNII | 9H250YYY0R |
| UN number | UN3389 |
| CompTox Dashboard (EPA) | DTXSID8060329 |
- InChI: InChI=1S/CH3FO2S/c1-5(2,3)4/h1H3 Key: KNWQLFOXPQZGPX-UHFFFAOYSA-N
- SMILES: CS(=O)(=O)F

Properties
| Chemical formula | CH_{3}FO_{2}S |
| Molar mass | 98.09 g·mol^{−1} |
| Appearance | liquid |
| Odor | pungent |
| Density | 1.427 g/mL |
| Boiling point | 123 to 124 °C (253 to 255 °F; 396 to 397 K) |
| Solubility in water | Reacts |
| Refractive index (n_{D}) | 1.360 |

Hazards
- Occupational safety and health (OHS/OSH)
| Main hazards | Corrosive; Highly toxic |
- GHS labelling
| Pictograms | (GHS05: Corrosive) (GHS06: Toxic) |
| Hazard statements | H300, H314, H330 |
| Precautionary statements | P301+P310, P303+P361+P353, P304+P340, P305+P351+P338, P320, P330, P405, P501 |

Related compounds
| Other anions | Methanesulfonyl chloride |
- Except where otherwise noted, data are given for materials in their standard state (at 25 °C [77 °F], 100 kPa). Infobox references

Methanesulfonyl fluoride (MSF) is a potent inhibitor of acetylcholinesterase (AChE), the enzyme that regulates acetylcholine, which is an important neurotransmitter in both the central and peripheral nervous systems.

== Technical and physical properties ==
MSF is a colorless to yellowish hygroscopic liquid. It is corrosive and highly toxic. It is an oxydiaphoric inhibitor (acid-transferring inhibitor) of the enzyme acetylcholinesterase. At room temperature, MSF has a vapor pressure of 19.2 mmHg, slightly higher volatility than that of water. The vapor of MSF has an LCt_{50} in rats of between 4 and 5 parts per million (ppm) during a one-hour or between 1 and 1.2 ppm during a seven-hour exposure. MSF produces no subtle biological effects from direct action, which is independent of its ability to inhibit cholinesterase. Repeated exposures to 1/10 of the LCt_{50} does not produce overt systemic toxicity or significant pathology. MSF can cause severe skin burns and serious eye damage upon contact. It is a lachrymator, and its vapor causes eye irritation and tearing.

Methanesulfonyl fluoride has a pungent odor. It undergoes decomposition when heated to liberate toxic fumes of fluorides and sulfur oxides (SO_{x}).

== Synthesis ==
MSF is synthesised by treating methanesulfonyl chloride with potassium fluoride or potassium bifluoride in water, followed by steam distillation to separate the product.

== Therapeutic study ==
Animal studies have shown that MSF-induced inhibition of AChE is highly selective for the brain when studied in vivo. MSF is an irreversible inhibitor of AChE, where its inhibition is overcome by de novo synthesis of new AChE in tissue. The recovery of AChE activity in the brain is less than one-tenth as rapid as recovery in the gastrointestinal system, allowing very high accumulated AChE inhibition in the brain and clinically insignificant inhibition in peripheral tissues. The high selectivity of MSF for inhibition in the brain has suggested that it could be used as a treatment for dementia of the Alzheimer type, that it is effective in reducing the persistent cognitive deficit after stroke, and is highly effective in reducing normal age-related memory impairment. This has been demonstrated by the performance of aged rats, which perform to the same mental capacity as younger rats.

Methanesulfonyl fluoride has been tested successfully in three human clinical trials as a treatment for Alzheimer's dementia. Two Phase I clinical trials for human safety at the doses proposed have shown that it is well tolerated and relatively free of the common side effects (nausea, vomiting, and diarrhea) produced by the current cholinesterase inhibitors used for the treatment of Alzheimer's dementia. An additional clinical trial testing both the safety and the efficacy of MSF found that it was well tolerated in the aged patients and was effective in reducing the symptoms of Alzheimer's dementia. A US Patent has been issued for the use of MSF for the treatment of dementia.
