= Brosyl group =

Functional group of the form R–SO2–C6H4–Br

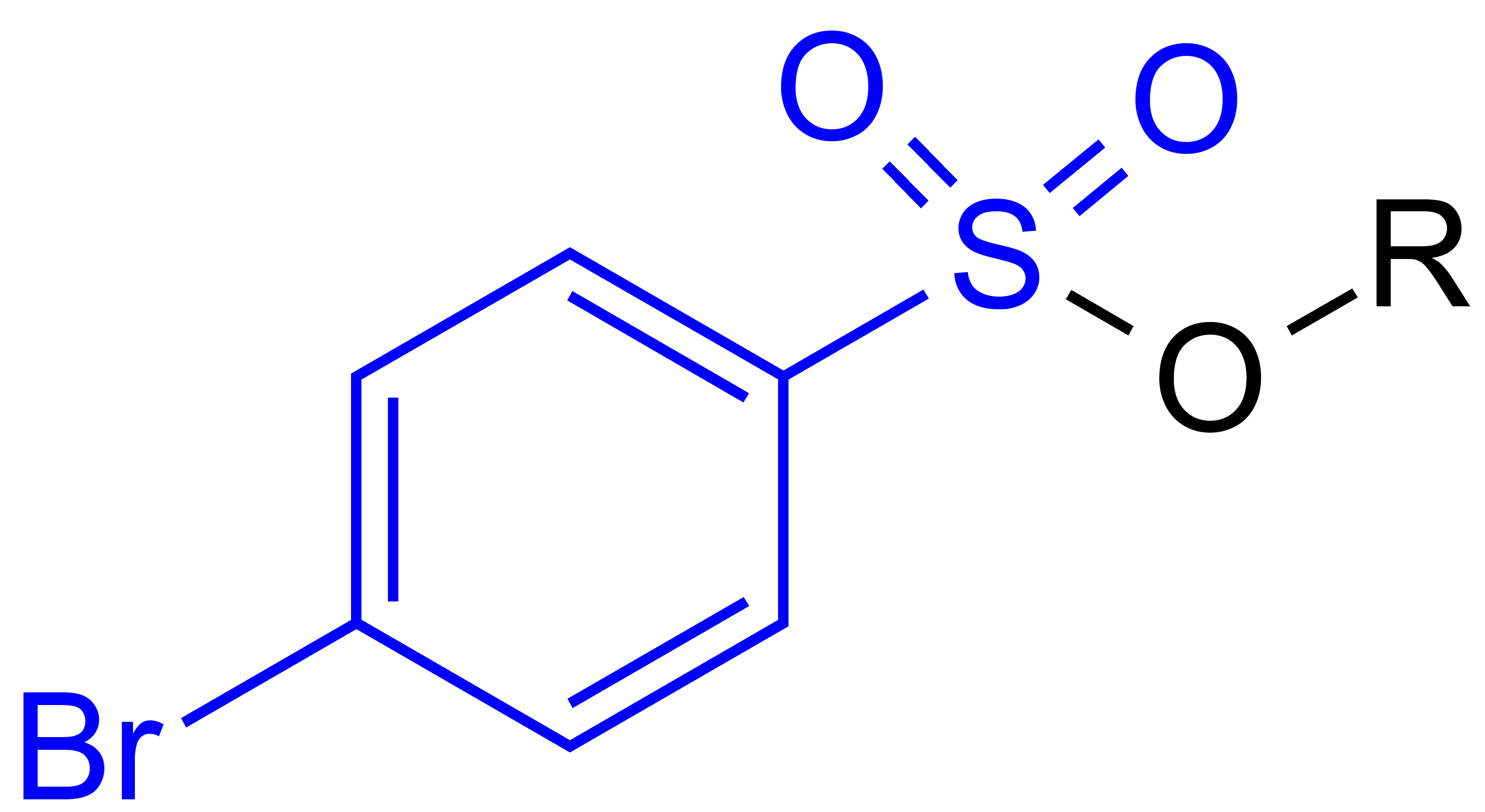
Skeletal formula with the brosyl group highlighted in blue

In organic chemistry, brosyl (or para-bromophenylsulfonyl) group is a functional group with the chemical formula BrC_{6}H_{4}SO_{2} and structure Br−C_{6}H_{4}−SO_{2}−R. This group is usually introduced using the compound brosyl chloride, BrC_{6}H_{4}SO_{2}Cl, which forms sulfonyl esters and amides of p-bromophenylsulfonic acid. The term brosylate refers to the anion of p-bromophenylsulfonic acid (BrC_{6}H_{4}SO^{−}_{3}).

== See also ==
- Tosyl group
- Tosylic acid
- Triflic acid
- Sulfonyl group
