= Sulfene =

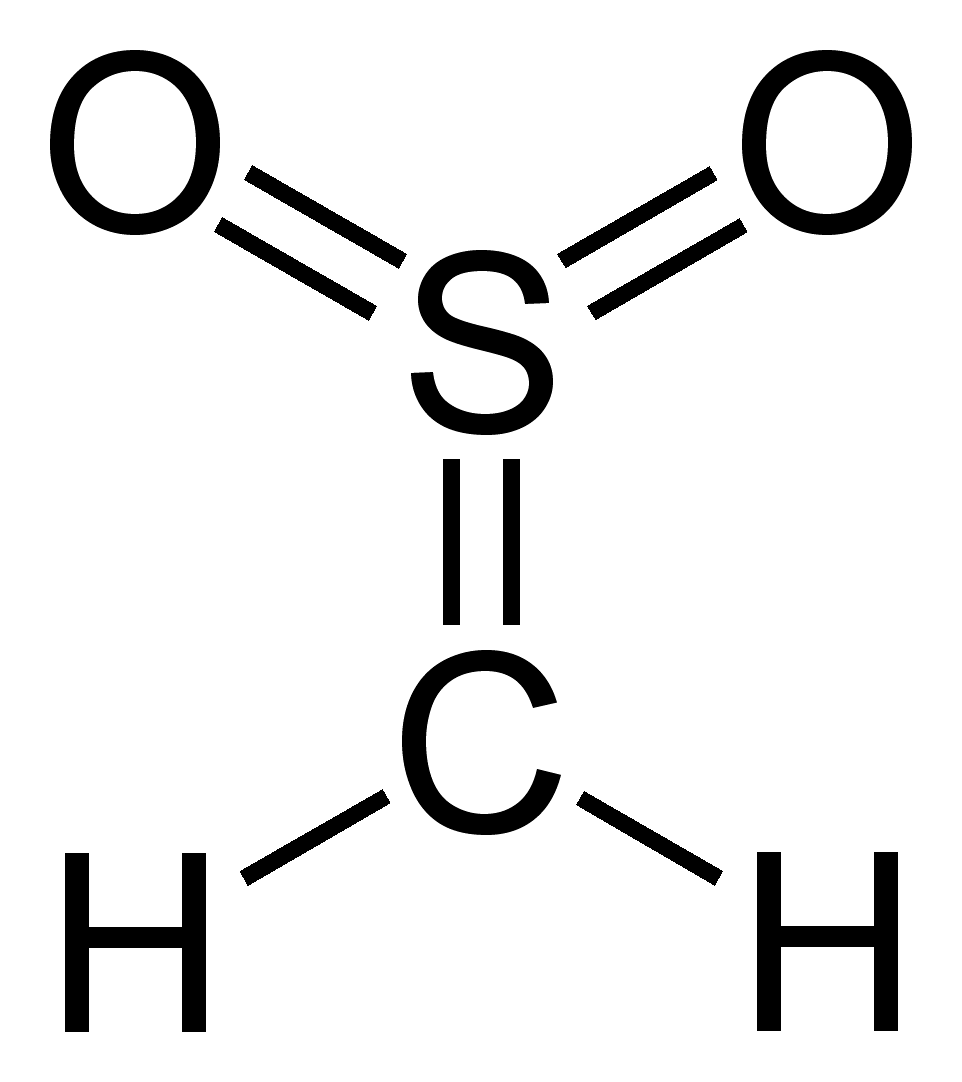
Skeletal formula of sulfene with both explicit hydrogens added
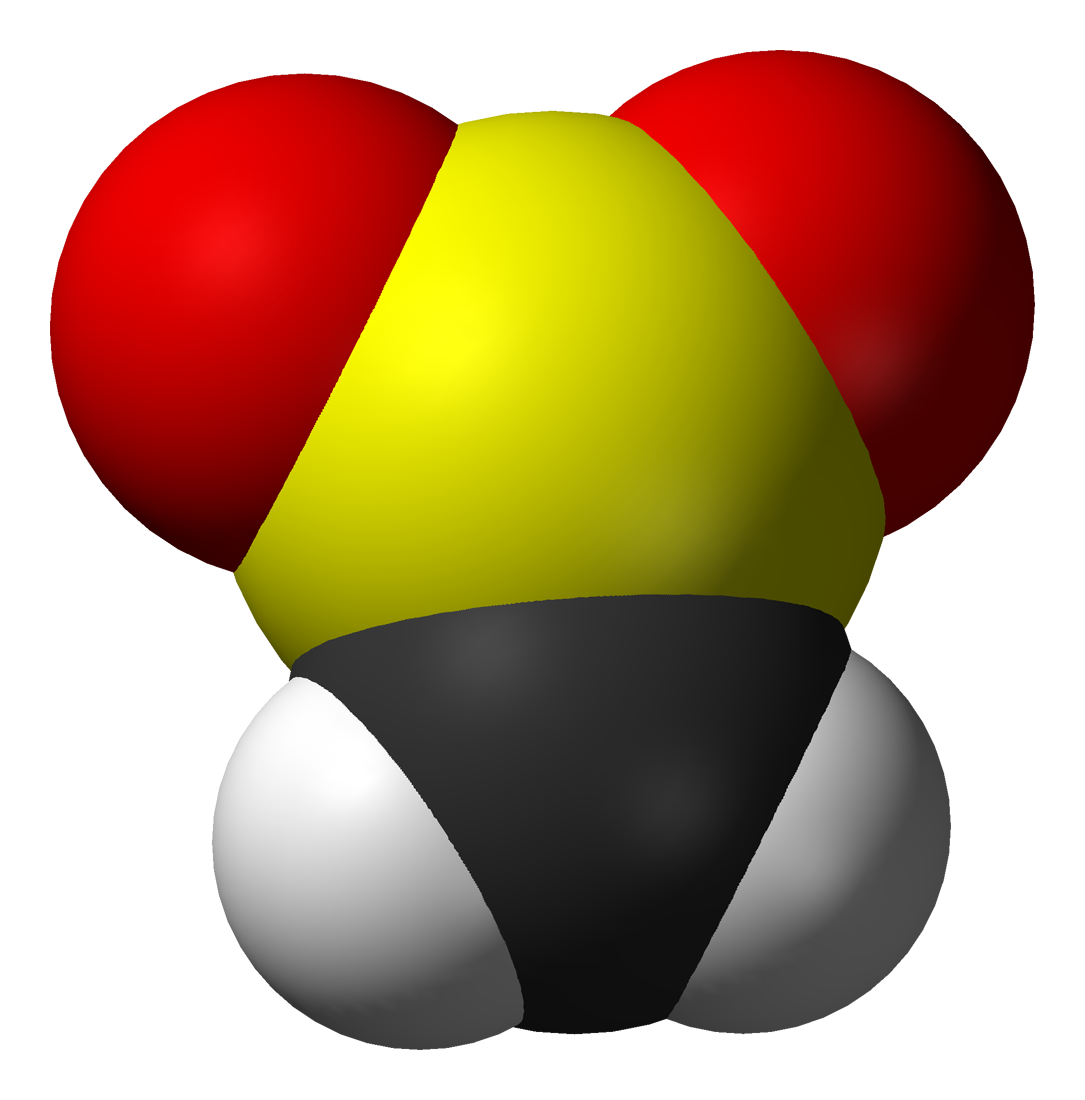
Spacefill model of sulfene

Names
- Other names Thioformaldehyde-S,S-dioxide; Methanethione dioxide; Methylidene-λ^{6}-sulfanedione

Identifiers
CAS Number	917-73-7
3D model (JSmol)	Interactive image
ChemSpider	10645700
PubChem CID	12244237
CompTox Dashboard (EPA)	DTXSID60482121
- InChI: InChI=1S/CH2O2S/c1-4(2)3/h1H2 Key: LZOZLBFZGFLFBV-UHFFFAOYSA-N; InChI=1/CH2O2S/c1-4(2)3/h1H2 Key: LZOZLBFZGFLFBV-UHFFFAOYAF
- SMILES: C=S(=O)=O

Properties
Chemical formula	CH_{2}O_{2}S
Molar mass	78.08 g·mol^{−1}

Structure
Molecular shape	trigonal planar at C and S
- Except where otherwise noted, data are given for materials in their standard state (at 25 °C [77 °F], 100 kPa). verify (what is ?) Infobox references

Sulfene is an extremely reactive chemical compound with the formula H_{2}C=SO_{2}. It is the simplest member of the sulfenes, the group of compounds which are S,S-dioxides of thioaldehydes and thioketones, and have the general formula R_{2}C=SO_{2}.

== Preparation ==
The first general method for preparation of sulfene as an intermediate, reported simultaneously in 1962 by Gilbert Stork and by Günther Optiz, involved the removal of hydrogen chloride from methanesulfonyl chloride using triethylamine in the presence of an enamine as trapping agent. The formation of a thietane 1,1-dioxide derivative was taken as evidence for the intermediacy of sulfene. Because of the highly electrophilic character of sulfene, the use of amines presents difficulties, since they can intercept the sulfene to form adducts. A simple alternative which avoids the use of amines involves desilylation of trimethylsilylmethanesulfonyl chloride with cesium fluoride in the presence of trapping agents.

(CH_{3})_{3}SiCH_{2}SO_{2}Cl + CsF → [CH_{2}=SO_{2}] + (CH_{3})_{3}SiF + CsCl

Alternatively, sulfenes can be stabilized by installing amido substituents on the alkylidene substituent. The extreme case is thiourea dioxide, which features planar amido groups.

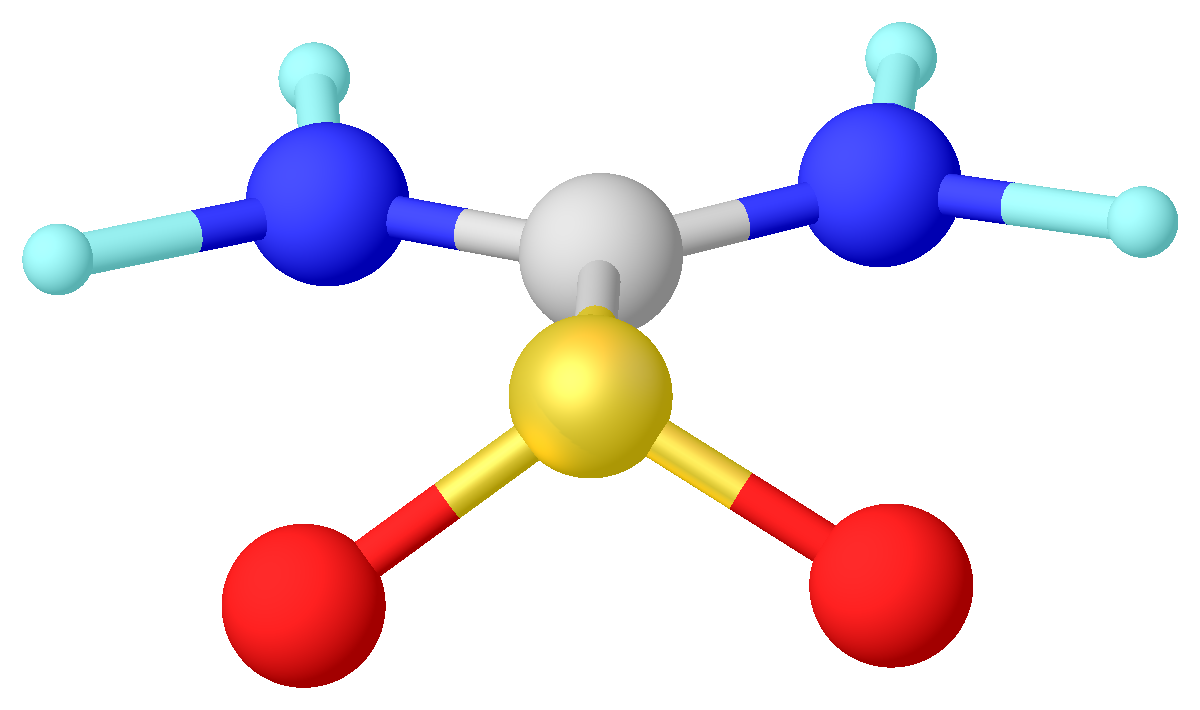
Structure of thiourea dioxide ((H_{2}N)_{2}CSO_{2}). Selected distances and angles: r_{S=O} = 1.49, r_{S=C} = 1.85.1, r_{C-N} = 1.31 Å, sum of angles around S = 312.4°.

== Reactions ==
Sulfenes react with enamines, ynamines, and 1,3-cyclopentadienes to give thietanes, thietes and Diels-Alder adducts, respectively. In the presence of a chiral tertiary amine complex, several sulfenes could be trapped with trichloroacetaldehyde (chloral) in a catalytic asymmetric synthesis of β-sulfones (four-membered ring sulfonate esters). Sulfene can also undergo insertion into metal–hydrogen bonds.

== See also ==
- Sulfine - related functional group with the formula H_{2}C=S=O
