= Methanesulfonyl chloride =

Chemical compound (CH3SO2Cl)

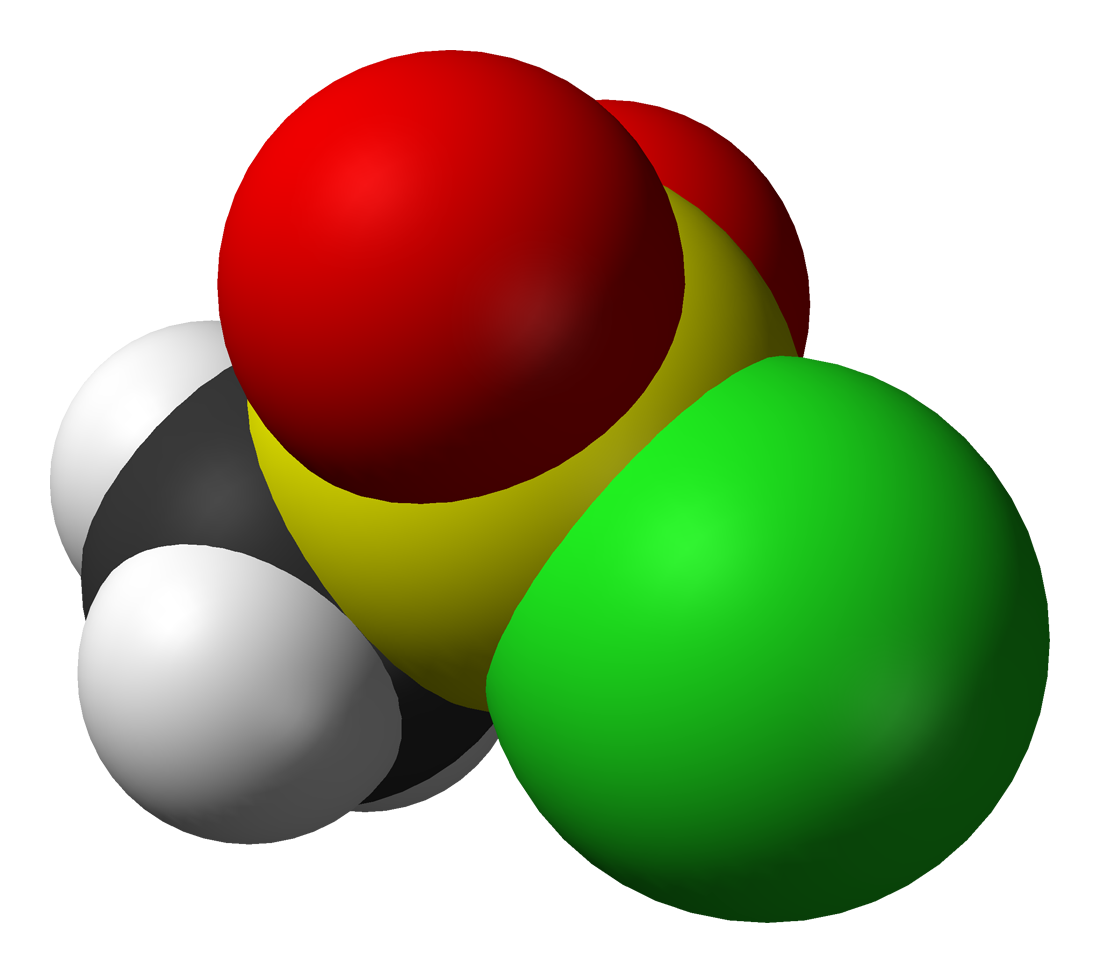

Names
- Preferred IUPAC name Methanesulfonyl chloride
- Other names Mesyl chloride

Identifiers
CAS Number	124-63-0
3D model (JSmol)	Interactive image
Abbreviations	MsCl
ChemSpider	29037
ECHA InfoCard	100.004.279
EC Number	204-706-1
PubChem CID	31297
UNII	B17EWY1R7Q
UN number	3246
CompTox Dashboard (EPA)	DTXSID1021615
- InChI: InChI=1S/CH3ClO2S/c1-5(2,3)4/h1H3 Key: QARBMVPHQWIHKH-UHFFFAOYSA-N
- SMILES: CS(Cl)(=O)=O

Properties
Chemical formula	CH_{3}ClO_{2}S
Molar mass	114.54 g·mol^{−1}
Appearance	colorless liquid
Odor	Pungent, unpleasant
Density	1.480 g/cm^{3}
Melting point	−32 °C (−26 °F; 241 K)
Boiling point	161 °C (322 °F; 434 K) (at 730 mmHg)
Solubility in water	Reacts
Solubility	Soluble in alcohol, ether and most organic solvents

Hazards
- Occupational safety and health (OHS/OSH)
Main hazards	Lachrymator, highly toxic, corrosive
- GHS labelling
Pictograms	(GHS05: Corrosive) (GHS06: Toxic) (GHS07: Exclamation mark)
Signal word	Danger
Hazard statements	H290, H300, H301, H302, H311, H312, H314, H317, H330, H335, H412
Precautionary statements	P234, P260, P262, P264, P264+P265, P270, P271, P272, P273, P280, P284, P301+P316, P301+P317, P301+P330+P331, P302+P352, P302+P361+P354, P304+P340, P305+P354+P338, P316, P317, P319, P320, P321, P330, P333+P317, P361+P364, P362+P364, P363, P390, P403+P233, P405, P501
Flash point	>110 °C (230 °F; 383 K)

Related compounds
Other anions	Methanesulfonyl fluoride
- Except where otherwise noted, data are given for materials in their standard state (at 25 °C [77 °F], 100 kPa). verify (what is ?) Infobox references

Methanesulfonyl chloride (mesyl chloride) is an organosulfur compound with the formula CH_{3}SO_{2}Cl. Using the organic pseudoelement symbol Ms for the methanesulfonyl (or mesyl) group CH_{3}SO_{2}–, it is frequently abbreviated MsCl in reaction schemes or equations. It is a colourless liquid that dissolves in polar organic solvents but is reactive toward water, alcohols, and many amines. The simplest organic sulfonyl chloride, it is used to make methanesulfonates and to generate the elusive molecule sulfene (methylenedioxosulfur(VI)).

== Preparation ==
It is produced by the reaction of methane and sulfuryl chloride in a radical reaction:

CH_{4} + SO_{2}Cl_{2} → CH_{3}SO_{2}Cl + HCl

Another method of production entails chlorination of methanesulfonic acid with thionyl chloride or phosgene:

CH_{3}SO_{3}H + SOCl_{2} → CH_{3}SO_{2}Cl + SO_{2} + HCl
CH_{3}SO_{3}H + COCl_{2} → CH_{3}SO_{2}Cl + CO_{2} + HCl

== Reactions ==
Methanesulfonyl chloride is a precursor to many compounds because it is highly reactive. It is an electrophile, functioning as a source of the "CH_{3}SO_{2}^{+}" synthon.

=== Methanesulfonates ===
Methanesulfonyl chloride is mainly used to give methanesulfonates by its reaction with alcohols in the presence of a non-nucleophilic base. In contrast to the formation of toluenesulfonates from alcohols and p-toluenesulfonyl chloride in the presence of pyridine, the formation of methanesulfonates is believed to proceed via a mechanism wherein methanesulfonyl chloride first undergoes an E1cB elimination to generate the highly reactive parent sulfene (CH_{2}=SO_{2}), followed by attack by the alcohol and rapid proton transfer to generate the observed product. This mechanistic proposal is supported by isotope labeling experiments and the trapping of the transient sulfene as cycloadducts.

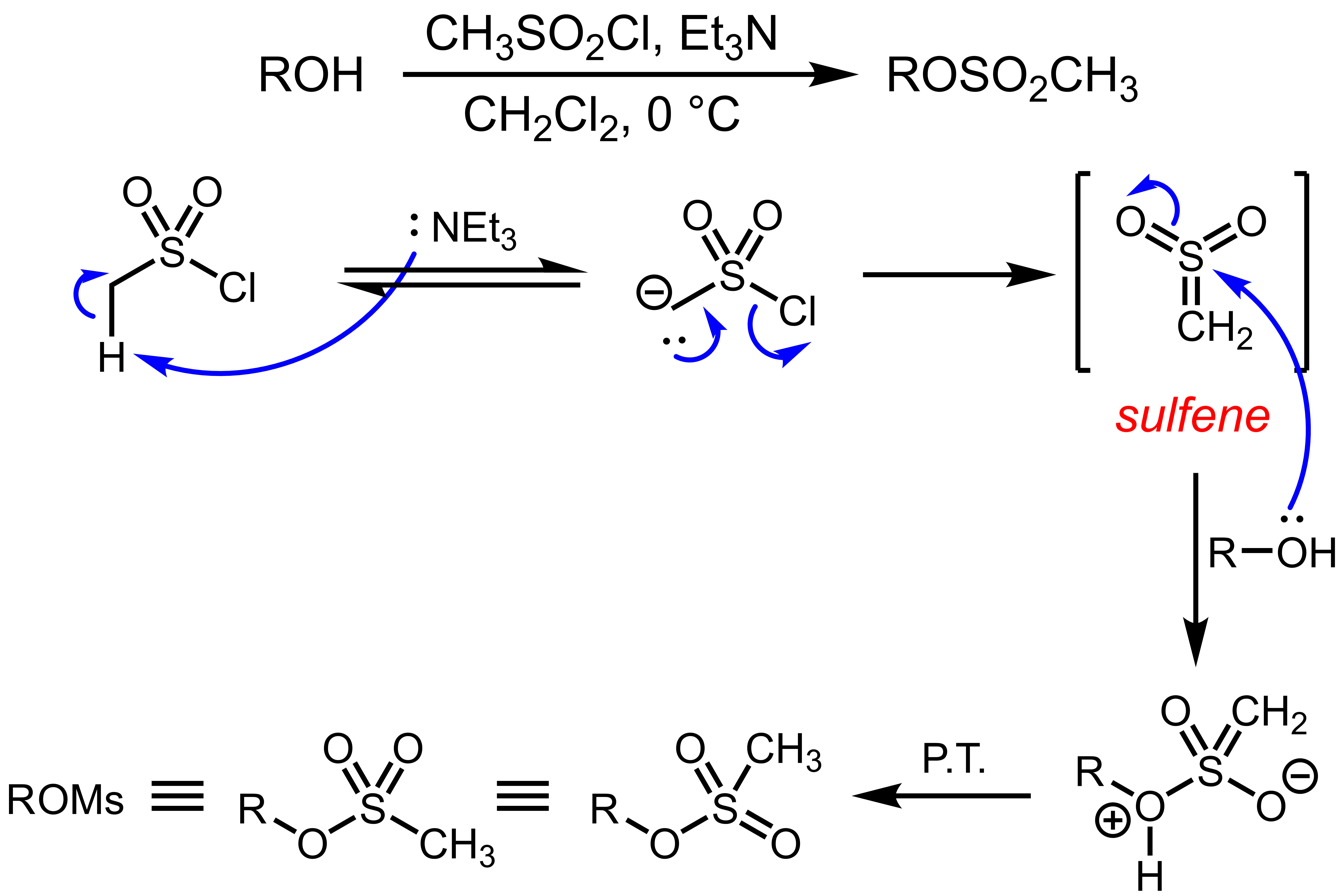

Methanesulfonates are used as intermediates in substitution reactions, elimination reactions, reductions, and rearrangement reactions. When treated with a Lewis acid, oxime methanesulfonates undergo facile Beckmann rearrangement.

Methanesulfonates are occasionally used as a protecting group for alcohols. They are stable to acidic conditions and is cleaved back to the alcohol using sodium amalgam.

=== Methanesulfonamides ===
Methanesulfonyl chloride react with primary and secondary amines to give methanesulfonamides. Unlike methanesulfonates, methanesulfonamides are very resistant toward hydrolysis under both acidic and basic conditions. When used as a protecting group, they can be converted back to amines using lithium aluminium hydride or a dissolving metal reduction.

=== Addition to alkynes ===
In the presence of copper(II) chloride, methanesulfonyl chloride will add across alkynes to form β-chloro sulfones.

=== Formation of heterocycles ===
Upon treatment with a base, such as triethylamine, methanesulfonyl chloride will undergo an elimination to form sulfene. Sulfene can undergo cycloadditions to form various heterocycles. α-Hydroxyketones react with sulfene to form five-membered sultones.

=== Miscellaneous ===
Forming acyliminium ions from α-hydroxyamides can be done using methanesulfonyl chloride and a base, typically triethylamine.

== Safety ==
Methanesulfonyl chloride is highly toxic by inhalation, corrosive, and acts as a lachrymator. It reacts with nucleophilic reagents (including water) in a strongly exothermic manner. When heated to decomposition point, it emits toxic vapors of sulfur oxides and hydrogen chloride.
