= Sulfonamide =

Organosulfur compounds containing –S(=O)_{2}–N< functional group

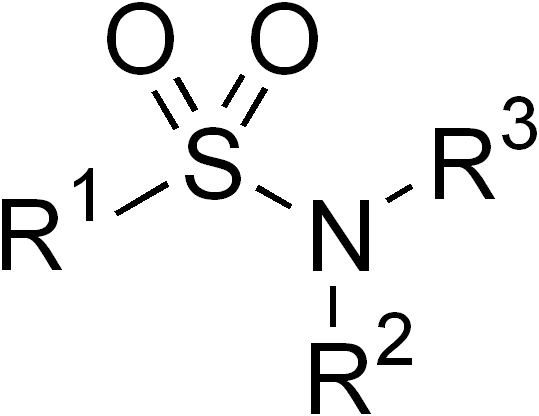
The structure of the sulfonamide group

In organic chemistry, the sulfonamide functional group (also spelled sulphonamide) is an organosulfur group with the structure R−S(=O)_{2}−NR_{2}. It consists of a sulfonyl group (O=S=O) connected to an amine group (−NH_{2}). Relatively speaking this group is unreactive. Because of the rigidity of the functional group, sulfonamides are typically crystalline; for this reason, the formation of a sulfonamide is a classic method to convert an amine into a crystalline derivative which can be identified by its melting point. Many important drugs contain the sulfonamide group.

A sulfonamide (compound) is a chemical compound that contains this group. The general formula is R−SO_{2}NR'R" or R−S(=O)_{2}−NR'R", where each R is some organic group; for example, "methanesulfonamide" (where R = methane, R' = R" = hydrogen) is CH_{3}SO_{2}NH_{2}. Any sulfonamide can be considered as derived from a sulfonic acid by replacing a hydroxyl group (−OH) with an amine group.

In medicine, the term "sulfonamide" is sometimes used as a synonym for sulfa drug, a derivative or variation of sulfanilamide. The first sulfonamide was discovered in Germany in 1932.

== Synthesis and reactions ==
Sulfonamides can be prepared in the laboratory in many ways. The classic approach entails the reaction of sulfonyl chlorides with an amine.

RSO_{2}Cl + R'_{2}NH → RSO_{2}NR'_{2} + HCl

A base such as pyridine is typically added to absorb the HCl that is generated. Illustrative is the synthesis of sulfonylmethylamide. The reaction of primary and secondary amines with benzenesulfonyl chloride is the basis of the Hinsberg reaction, a method for detecting primary and secondary amines.

Sulfonamides undergo a variety of acid-base reactions. The N-H bond can be deprotonated. The alkylsulfonamides can be deprotonated at carbon. Arylsulfonamides undergo ortho-lithiation.

== Sultams ==
Sultams are cyclic sulfonamides. Bioactive sultams include the antiinflammatory ampiroxicam and the anticonvulsant sulthiame. Sultams are prepared analogously to other sulfonamides, allowing for the fact that sulfonic acids are deprotonated by amines. They are often prepared by one-pot oxidation of disulfides or thiols linked to amines. An alternative synthesis of sultams involves initial preparation of a linear sulfonamide, followed by intramolecular C-C bond formation (i.e. cyclization), a strategy that was used in the synthesis of a sultam-based deep-blue emitter for organic electronics.

Sulfonamide-based compounds

Saccharin, a cyclic sulfonamide that was one of the first artificial sweeteners discovered

Sulfanilamide, a compound that foreshadowed the development of sulfa drugs

Sulfamethoxazole is a widely used antibiotic.

Ampiroxicam is a sultam used as an antiinflammatory drug.

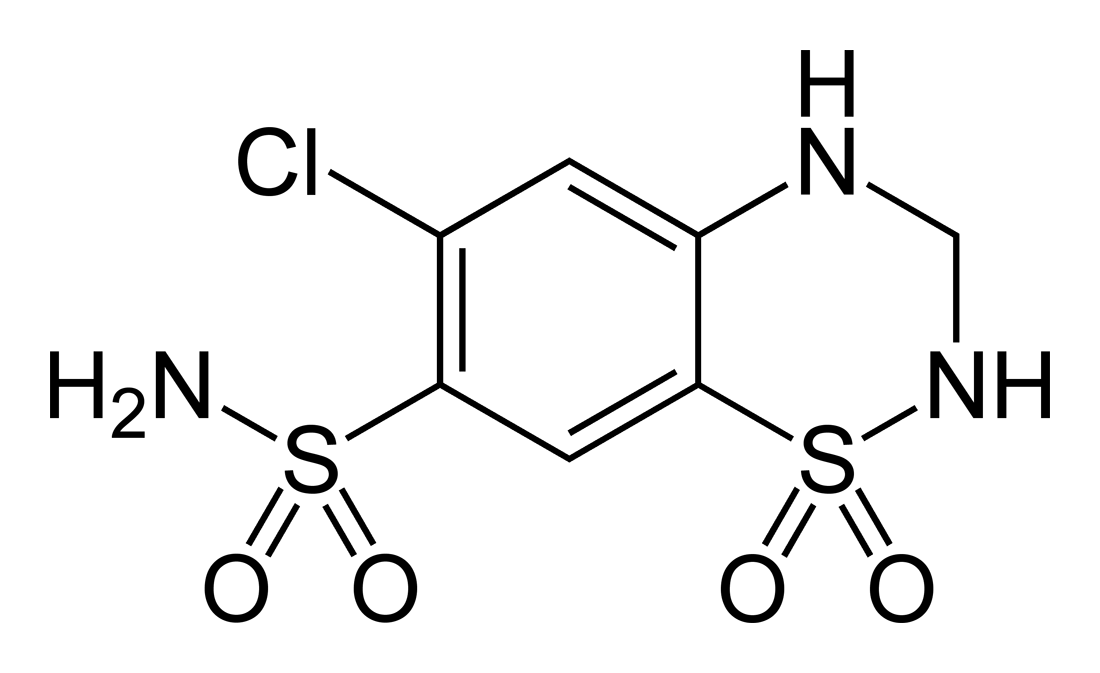
Hydrochlorothiazide is a drug that features both acyclic and cyclic sulfonamide groups.

Camphorsultam is a sultam used as a chiral auxiliary in organic synthesis.

== Disulfonimides ==
The disulfonimides are of the type R−S(=O)_{2}−N(H)−S(=O)_{2}−R' with two sulfonyl groups flanking an amine. As with sulfinamides, this class of compounds is used as catalysts in enantioselective synthesis.

Bis(trifluoromethanesulfonyl)aniline is a source of the triflyl (CF_{3}SO^{+}_{2}) group.

== See also ==
- Sulfamide — the sulfonamide parent compound
- Sulfamic acid — HOSO_{2}NH_{2}
- Sulfinamide — compounds of the form RS(=O)NR′R″
