= C20H12 =

The molecular formula C_{20}H_{12} may refer to:

- Benzofluoranthene
  - Benzo[a]fluoranthene
  - Benzo[b]fluoranthene (Benz[e]acephenanthrylene)
  - Benzo[j]fluoranthene
  - Benzo[k]fluoranthene
- Benzopyrene
  - Benzo[a]pyrene
  - Benzo[e]pyrene
- Perylene
