= Benzofluoranthene =

Benzofluoranthene may refer to:

- Benzo[a]fluoranthene
- Benzo[b]fluoranthene (Benz[e]acephenanthrylene)
- Benzo[j]fluoranthene
- Benzo[k]fluoranthene
