= List of benzo compounds =

In organic chemistry, the addition of the prefix benzo to the name of a chemical compound indicates the addition of an even number of carbon atoms to an unsaturated or already aromatic compound by which a new aromatic ring is formed. Between the prefix benzo and the name of the parent compound, the place of the addition of the extra carbon atoms is indicated by letters written between square brackets. (Note: In the names of pages in the Wikipedia curved brackets are used, as square brackets lead to malfunctioning in links to those pages.) Often the number of added carbon atoms is four, although sometimes two carbon atoms are sufficient, as shown in the following table. The first entry also shows different routes to the name of the same molecule.

== Examples ==
Parent compound	Structural formula of parent compound	Letters and numbers in the parent compound	Structural formula of the benzocompound	Benzocompound
Anthracene				Benzo[a]anthracene: by adding four extra carbon atoms to the parent compound, the leftmost upper ring is formed.
Phenanthrene				Benzo[b]fenanthrene: by adding four carbon atoms to the parent compound the right most ring is formed. Clearly this compound is identical to the compound above. As benzoant.. alphabetizes before benzophe.. (like numbers place letters first are omitted while indexing compounds, later on they are added again if necessary) the proper name for this compound is Benzo[a]anthracene.
Pyrene				Benzo[a]pyrene, by adding 4 carbon atoms to pyrene the leftmost ring is the extra one.
				Benzo[e]pyrene, by adding 4 carbon atoms to the pyrene along its short axis.
Fluoranthene				Benzo[b]fluoranthene, the leftmost ring is the extra ring, formed by adding four carbon atoms to the parent compound.
Fluoranthene				Benzo[ghi]fluoranthene, the top left ring is the extra one, formed by adding two extra carbon atoms.
Fluoranthene				Benzo[j]fluoranthene: by adding four carbon atoms to the parent compound, the ring at the bottom left is formed.
Fluoranthene				Benzo[k]fluoranthene, the leftmost ring is the extra one, formed by adding four carbon atoms to the parent compound.

== See also ==
- Benzodiazepine
- Benzene
- Benzosulfimide
- IUPAC nomenclature of organic chemistry
