= Soil contamination =

Pollution of land by human-made chemicals or other alteration which can cause death

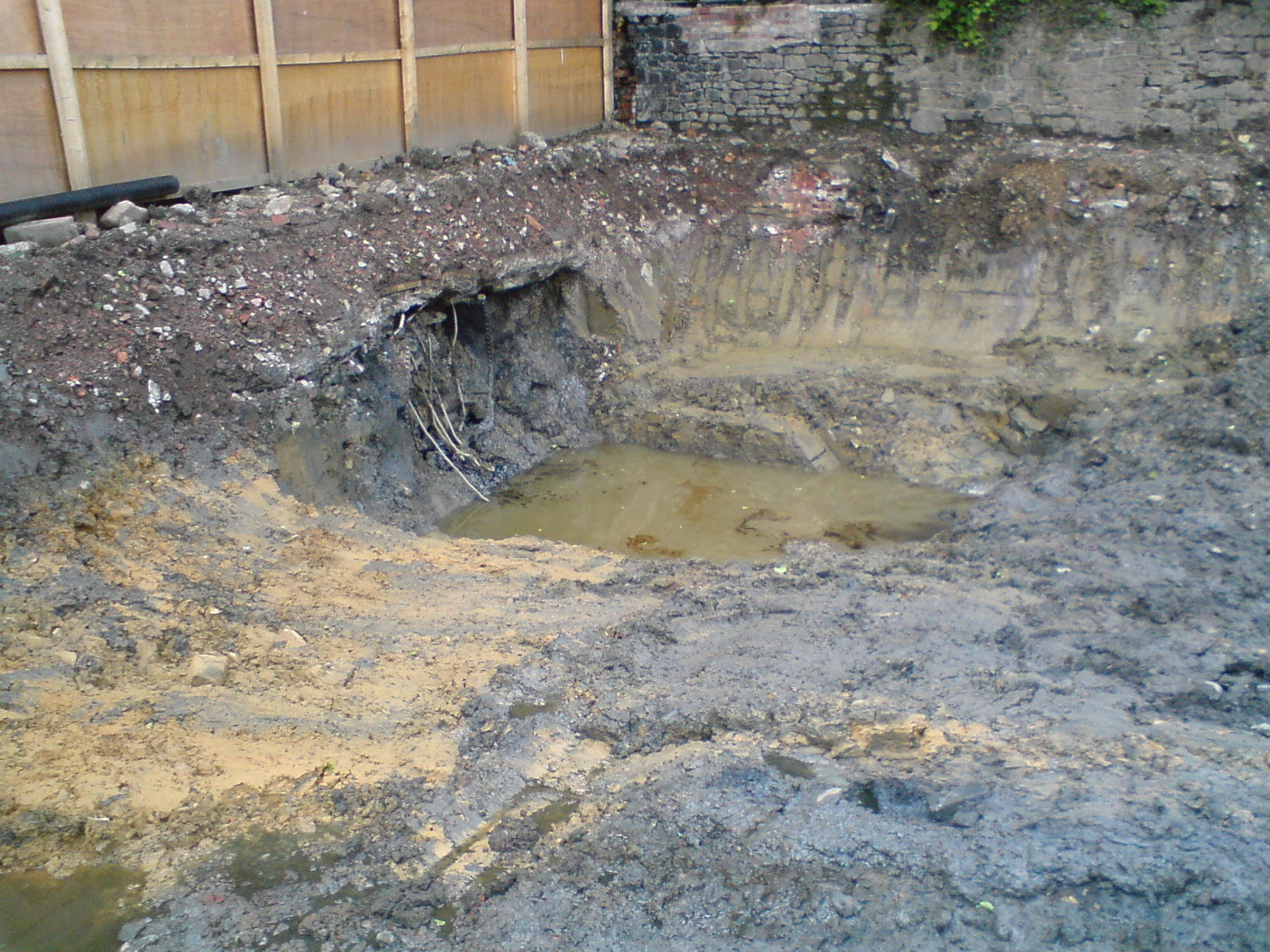
Excavation showing soil contamination at a disused gasworks in England

Soil contamination, soil pollution, or land pollution as a part of land degradation is caused by the presence of xenobiotic (human-made) chemicals or other alteration in the natural soil environment. It is typically caused by industrial activity, agricultural chemicals or improper disposal of waste. The most common chemicals involved are petroleum hydrocarbons, polynuclear aromatic hydrocarbons (such as naphthalene and benzo(a)pyrene), solvents, pesticides, and heavy metals. The concern over soil contamination stems primarily from health risks, from direct contact with contaminated soil or consumption of plants growing in contaminated soil, vapour inhalation from the contaminants, or from secondary contamination of water supplies within (groundwater) and underlying the soil (aquifer). Mapping of contaminated soil sites and the resulting cleanups are time-consuming and expensive tasks, and require expertise in geology, hydrology, chemistry, computer modelling, and GIS in Environmental Contamination, as well as an appreciation of the history of site pollution. It has been suggested that the examination of humus forms, which necessitates only a cursory glance upon ground floor thickness and structure of the underlying mineral horizon, could used at low cost for the early detection and mapping of potential soil contamination.

In North America and Europe the extent of contaminated land is best known for as many of the countries in these areas have a legal framework to identify and deal with this environmental problem. Other countries tend to be less tightly regulated despite some of them have undergone significant industrialization and are searching for more regulation.

== Causes ==
Soil pollution can be caused by the following (non-exhaustive list):

- Microplastics
- Oil spills
- Mining and activities by other heavy industries
- Accidental spills may happen during activities, etc.
- Corrosion of underground storage tanks (including piping used to transmit the contents)
- Acid rain
- Intensive farming
- Agrochemicals, such as pesticides, herbicides and fertilizers
- Petrochemicals
- Industrial accidents
- Road debris
- Construction activities
- Exterior lead-based paints
- Drainage of contaminated surface water into the soil
- Ammunitions, chemical agents, and other agents of war
- Waste disposal
  - Oil dumping and fuel dumping
  - Nuclear wastes
  - Direct discharge of industrial wastes to the soil
  - Discharge of sewage
  - Landfill and illegal dumping
  - Coal ash
  - Electronic waste
  - Contamination by rocks containing large amounts of toxic elements.
  - Contamination by Pb due to vehicle exhaust, Cd, and Zn caused by tire wear.
  - Contamination by strengthening air pollutants by incineration of fossil raw materials.

The most common chemicals involved are petroleum hydrocarbons, solvents, pesticides, lead, and other heavy metals.

Any activity that leads to other forms of soil degradation (erosion, compaction, etc.) may indirectly worsen the contamination effects in that soil remediation becomes more tedious.

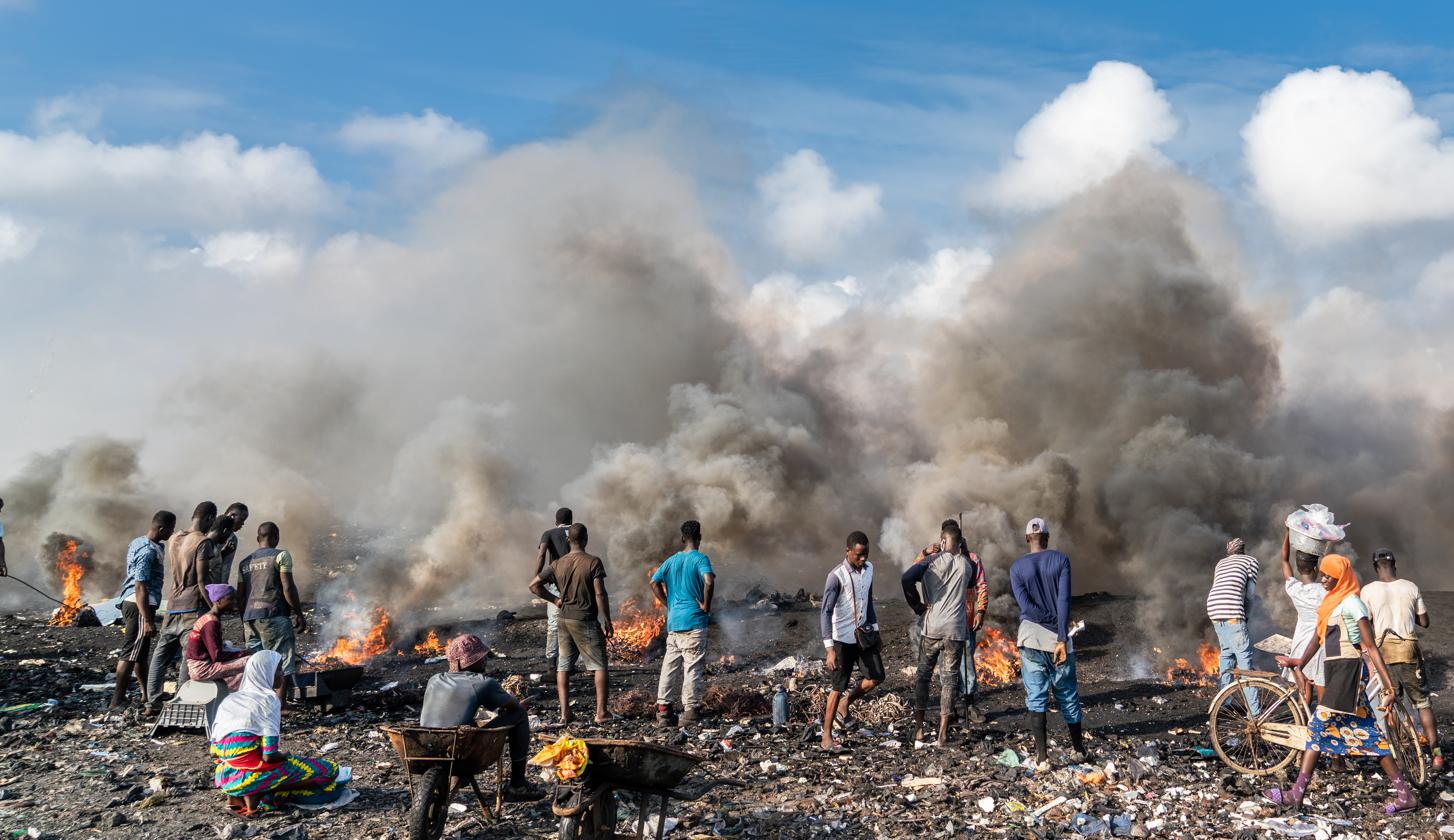
E-waste processing in Agbogbloshie, Ghana. Improper disposal of manufactured goods and industrial wastes, often means that communities in the global south have to process goods. Especially without proper protections, heavy metals and other contaminates can seep into the soil, and create water pollution and air pollution.

Historical deposition of coal ash used for residential, commercial, and industrial heating, as well as for industrial processes such as ore smelting, were a common source of contamination in areas that were industrialized before about 1960. Coal naturally concentrates arsenic, cadmium lead and zinc during its formation, as well as other heavy metals to a lesser degree. When the coal is burned, most of these metals become concentrated in the ash (the principal exception being mercury, which evaporates). Coal ash and slag may contain sufficient lead to qualify as a "characteristic hazardous waste", defined in the US as containing more than 5 mg/L, further revised to 1.5 mg/L of extractable lead using the TCLP procedure. In addition to lead, coal ash typically contains variable but significant concentrations of polynuclear aromatic hydrocarbons (PAHs; e.g., benzo(a)anthracene, benzo(b)fluoranthene, benzo(k)fluoranthene, benzo(a)pyrene, indeno(1,2,3-cd)pyrene, phenanthrene, anthracene, and others). These PAHs are known human carcinogens and the acceptable concentrations of them in soil are typically from 0.1 mg/kg to 10 mg/kg, with a strong variation from a PAH to another. Coal ash and slag can be recognised by the presence of off-white grains in soil, gray heterogeneous soil, or (coal slag) bubbly, vesicular pebble-sized grains.

Treated sewage sludge, known in the industry as biosolids, has become controversial as a "fertilizer". As it is the byproduct of sewage treatment, it generally contains more contaminants such as organisms, pesticides, and heavy metals than other soil. In the European Union, the Urban Waste Water Treatment Directive allows sewage sludge to be sprayed onto land, although several European countries have introduced more stringent requirements in comparison with the directive. 10 million tons dry matter of sewage sludge have been produced in Europe every year over the period 2003–2006. This has good agricultural properties due to the high nitrogen, phosphate and potassium content. However, there is a need to control sewage sludge application to agricultural land so that pathogenic microorganisms do not get into water courses and to ensure that there is no accumulation of heavy metals in the topsoil. Composting of sewage sludge allows to decrease its content in pathogens and organic pollutants (bioremediation, to the exception of persistent organic pollutants) but not that of heavy metals, although these are in a less bioavailable form.

=== Pesticides and Herbicides ===
A pesticide is a substance used to kill a pest. A pesticide may be a chemical substance, biological agent (such as a virus or bacteria), antimicrobial, disinfectant or device used against any pest. Pests include harmful insects, plant pathogens, weeds, mollusks, birds, mammals, fish, nematodes (roundworms) and microbes that compete with humans for food, destroy property, spread or are a vector for disease or cause a nuisance. Although there are benefits to the use of pesticides, there are also drawbacks, such as potential toxicity to humans and other organisms.

Herbicides are used to kill weeds, especially on pavements and railways, but also in agricultural crops either for destructing the total vegetation (e.g. glyphosate) or only a class of undesired plants (e.g. 2,4-D). The so-called auxin herbicides are similar to auxins and are selective to dicots. Glyphosate is a non-selective (broad-spectrum) systemic herbicide which competes with enzymes used in the synthesis of key plant amino acids. Most herbicides are biodegradable by soil bacteria. However, one group derived from trinitrotoluene (2,4-D and 2,4,5-T) have the impurity dioxin, which is very toxic and causes fatality even in low concentrations. Another common herbicide is Paraquat, banned in the European Union but still frequently used in agricultural areas of the United States and Asia. It is highly toxic to humans and other animals and cannot rapidly degrade in the soil where it is adsorbed and thus protected in clay lattices. Glyphosate is rapidly transformed in AMPA by soil bacteria but its residues are detected in drinking water, agriculture, and food products and have major effects on the health of reproductive systems.Glyphosate is used in genetically modified crops to kill all vegetation except the target crop, more especially in developing countries where it offers yield and profit gains despite growing concerns about environment and human health.

Insecticides are used to rid farms of pests which damage crops. The insects damage not only standing crops but also stored ones and in the tropics it is reckoned that one third of the total production is lost during food storage. As with fungicides, the first insecticides used in the nineteenth century were inorganic e.g. Paris Green and other compounds of arsenic. Nicotine has also been used since 1690. Neonicotinoids, i.e. synthetic insecticides derived from nicotin are the last generation of insecticides. They have been scheduled to be highly selective to insect pests, although it appeared that acetamiprid, IMI, and thiacloprid were toxic to birds, thiacloprid to fish, and several neonicotinoids were harmful to honeybees, either by direct contact or ingestion.

There are now three main groups of synthetic insecticides:

1. Organochlorines include DDT, Aldrin, Dieldrin and benzene hexachloride (BHC). They are cheap to produce, potent and persistent but have harmful effects on a lot of beneficial organisms, from microbes to a wide range of plants and animals, humans included, hence their banishment in many (but not all) countries, inasmuch as resistance occurred in a lot of target insect pests. DDT was used on a massive scale from the 1930s, with a peak of 72,000 tonnes used in 1970. Then usage fell as the harmful environmental effects were realized. It was found worldwide in fish and birds and was even discovered in the snow in the Antarctic. It is only slightly soluble in water but is very soluble in the bloodstream, and in fats. It affects the nervous and endocrine systems and causes the eggshells of birds to lack calcium causing them to be easily breakable. It is thought to be responsible for the decline of numbers of birds of prey like ospreys and peregrine falcons in the 1950s, now recovering. As well as increased concentration via the food chain, it is known to enter via permeable membranes, so fish get it through their gills and then it accumulates in fatty organs. As it has low water solubility and a high affinity to the air-water interface, DDT tends to stay at the water surface, so organisms that live there are most affected, in particular mosquito larvae, the target organisms of malaria control. DDT and its breakdown product DDE found in fish that formed part of the human food chain caused concern, with levels found in human liver, kidney and brain tissues around 13 ppm in 1970, with a general decrease since DDT was banished from developing countries but with still high levels in Asia and Africa where DDT is used against malaria. DDT was banned by the Stockholm convention in 2001 to stop its further buildup in the food chain. However, the World Health Organization allowed its reintroduction only for control of vector-borne diseases in some tropical countries in 2006. U.S. manufacturers continued to sell DDT to developing countries, who could not afford the expensive replacement chemicals and who did not have such stringent regulations governing the use of pesticides.

2. Organophosphates, e.g. parathion, methyl parathion and about 40 other insecticides are available nationally. Parathion is highly toxic, methyl-parathion less so but health concerns have resulted in cancellation of the use of methyl-parathion in most food crops in the United States. There is no evidence that malathion affects the ability of humans to reproduce. There is also no conclusive proof that malathion causes cancer in humans, although some studies have found increased incidence of some cancers in people who are regularly exposed to pesticides, such as farmers and pesticide applicators. This group of insecticides works by preventing normal nerve transmission as acetylcholinesterase is prevented from breaking down the transmitter substance acetylcholine, resulting in uncontrolled muscle movements.

3. Neonicotinoids, e.g. acetamiprid, imidacloprid, are the last generation of insecticides and are now largely used for crop protection. They affect the central nervous system of insects, with higher selectivity for insects than organophosphates and organochlorines. However, their biocidal action includes both pests and beneficial organisms, e.g. pollinators, predatory insects, parasitoids. The ay also act as endocrine disruptors on juvenile bees. The dramatic decline of honey bee colonies, for example, could be linked to, or at least exacerbated by the use of neonicotinoids. Like nicotine, their molecular base, they are degraded in the soil but the environmental residues of neonicotinoids have enormously increased due to large-scale applications.

=== Agents of war ===
The disposal of munitions, and a lack of care in manufacture of munitions caused by the urgency of production, can contaminate soil for extended periods. There is little published evidence on this type of contamination largely because of restrictions placed by governments of many countries on the publication of material related to war effort, in particular under ongoing conflict scenarios. However, mustard gas stored during World War II has contaminated some sites for up to 50 years and the testing of Anthrax as a potential biological weapon contaminated the whole island of Gruinard, leaving it in quarantine for 48 years. There are abandoned delaboration sites around the former World War I front in Belgium and also in France which are still contaminated by arsenic and lead.

== Human Health ==
=== Exposure pathways ===
Contaminated or polluted soil directly affects human health through direct contact with soil or via inhalation of soil contaminants that have vaporized. Potentially greater threats are posed by the infiltration of soil contaminants into groundwater aquifers used for irrigation or direct human consumption, sometimes in areas far from any apparent source of above-ground contamination (long-range diffuse soil contamination). Toxic metals can also make their way up the food chain through plants that reside in soils containing high concentrations of heavy metals. This tends to result in the development of pollution-related diseases.

Most exposure to soil contamination is accidental, and can happen through:

- Ingesting dust or soil directly
- Ingesting food or vegetables grown in contaminated soil or with foods in contact with contaminants
- Skin contact with dust or soil
- Vapors from the soil
- Inhaling clouds of dust while working in soils or windy environments

However, some studies estimate that 90% of human exposure is through eating contaminated food.

=== Consequences ===
Health consequences from exposure to soil contamination vary greatly depending on pollutant type, the pathway of attack, and the vulnerability of the exposed population. Researchers suggest that pesticides and heavy metals in soil may harm cardiovascular health, including inflammation and change in the body's circadian rhythm.

Chronic exposure to chromium, lead, and other metals, petroleum, solvents, and many pesticide and herbicide formulations can be carcinogenic (mutagenic), can cause congenital disorders, or other chronic diseases. Industrial or human-made concentrations of naturally occurring substances, such as nitrate and ammonia associated with livestock manure from agricultural operations, have also been identified as health hazards in soil and groundwater.

Chronic exposure to benzene at sufficient concentrations is known to be associated with a higher incidence of leukemia. Mercury and cyclodienes are known to induce higher incidences of kidney damage and some irreversible diseases. PCBs and cyclodienesare linked to liver toxicity. Organophosphates can cause a chain of responses leading to neuromuscular blockage. Many chlorinated solvents induce liver changes, kidney changes, and depression of the central nervous system. There is an entire spectrum of further health effects such as headache, nausea, fatigue, eye irritation and skin rash for the above cited and other chemicals, including those commonly used in agriculture. At sufficient dosages a large number of soil contaminants can cause death by exposure via direct contact, inhalation or ingestion.

== Ecosystem effects ==
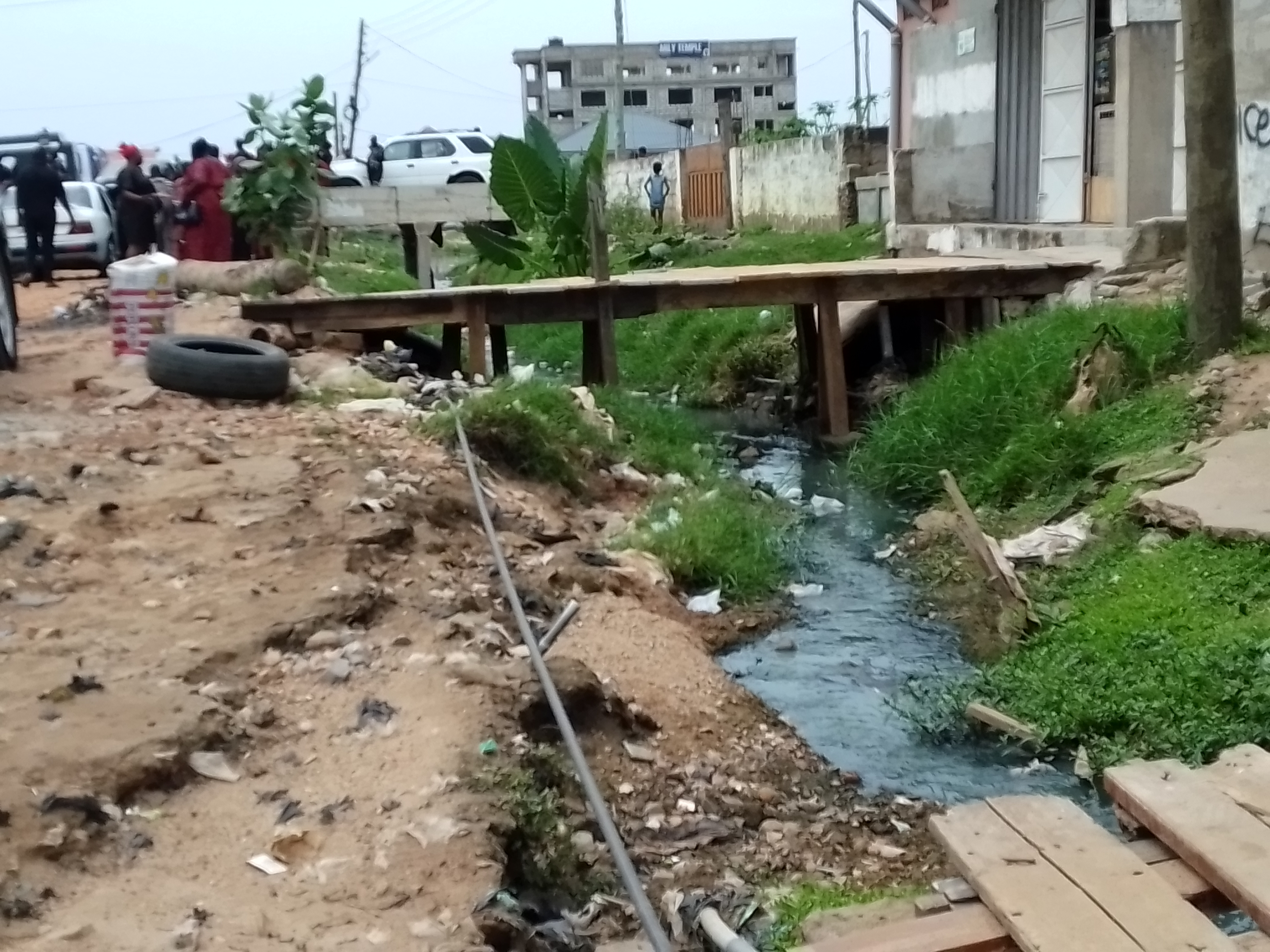
This area is contaminated with stagnant water and refuse, making the environment unhygienic.

Not unexpectedly, soil contaminants can have significant deleterious consequences for ecosystems. There are radical soil chemistry changes which can arise from the presence of many hazardous chemicals even at low concentration of the contaminant species. These changes can manifest in the alteration of the metabolism of soil microorganisms and soil animals resident in a given soil environment. The result can be virtual eradication of some of the primary food chain, which in turn could have major consequences for predator or consumer species. Even if the chemical effect on lower life forms is small, the lower pyramid levels of the food chain may ingest alien chemicals, which then become more and more concentrated for each consuming rung of the food chain. Many of these effects are now well known, such as the concentration of persistent DDT materials for avian consumers, leading to weakening of egg shells, increased chick mortality and potential extinction of species.

Detrimental impacts of contaminants on soil food chains result in dramatic changes in humus forms, mediated by the disappearance or reduced activity of key organisms, also called soil ecosystem engineers, e.g. earthworms, which are particularly sensitive to a wide range of soil contaminants. In contaminated land the topsoil passes from a stage in which organic matter is decomposed and incorporated to mineral matter (mull humus, with a good granular soil structure) to a stage in which organic matter accumulates undecayed above a compact mineral soil with poor structure (mor humus).

Agricultural lands display certain types of soil contamination, involving in particular heavy metals and metalloids. These contaminants typically alter plant metabolism, often causing a reduction in crop yields. This has a secondary effect upon soil conservation, since the languishing crops cannot shield the Earth's soil from erosion. Some of these chemical contaminants have long half-lives and in other cases derivative chemicals are formed from decay of primary soil contaminants.

=== Potential effects of contaminants to soil functions ===
Heavy metals and other soil contaminants can adversely affect the activity, species composition and abundance of soil microorganisms, thereby threatening soil functions such as biochemical cycling of carbon and nitrogen. However, soil contaminants can also become less bioavailable by time (natural attenuation), and microorganisms and ecosystems can adapt to altered conditions. Soil properties such as pH, organic matter content and texture are very important and modify mobility, bioavailability and toxicity of pollutants in contaminated soils. The same amount of contaminant can be toxic in one soil but totally harmless in another soil. This stresses the need for soil-specific risk assessment and remediation measures.

== Cleanup options ==
Cleanup or environmental remediation is analyzed by environmental scientists who utilize field measurement of soil chemicals and also apply computer models (GIS in Environmental Contamination) for analyzing transport and fate of soil chemicals. Various technologies have been developed for remediation of oil-contaminated soil and sediments. There are several principal strategies for remediation of contaminated soils:

- Excavate soil and take it to a disposal site away from ready pathways for human or sensitive ecosystem contact. This technique also applies to dredging of bay muds or navigable canals containing toxicants.
- Aeration of soils at the contaminated site, with attendant risk of creating air pollution.
- Thermal remediation (thermal desorption) by introduction of heat to raise subsurface temperatures sufficiently high to volatilize chemical contaminants out of the soil for vapor extraction. Technologies include in situ thermal desorption (ISTD), electrical resistance heating (ERH), and electro thermal dynamic stripping process (ET-DSP).
- Bioremediation, involving microbial digestion of certain organic chemicals. Techniques used in bioremediation include landfarming, biostimulation and bioaugmentating soil biota with commercially available microflora.
- Extraction of groundwater or soil vapor with an active electromechanical system (electrokinetic soil flushing (EKSF)), with subsequent air stripping of the contaminants from the extract.
- Phytoremediation, or using plants (such as willow) to extract heavy metals.
- Mycoremediation, or using fungi to metabolize contaminants and accumulate heavy metals.
- Remediation of oil contaminated sediments with self-collapsing air microbubbles.
- Surfactant leaching.
- Interfacial solar evaporation to extract heavy metal ions from moist soil.

== By country ==
Various national standards for concentrations of particular contaminants include the United States EPA Region 9 Preliminary Remediation Goals (U.S. PRGs), the United States EPA Region 3 Risk Based Concentrations (U.S. EPA RBCs), and National Environment Protection Council of Australia Guideline on Investigation Levels for Soil and Groundwater.

=== People's Republic of China ===
The immense and sustained growth of the People's Republic of China since the 1970s has exacted a price from the land in increased soil pollution. The Ministry of Ecology and Environment believes it to be a threat to the environment, to food safety and to sustainable agriculture. According to a scientific sampling, 150 million mu (100,000 square kilometres) of China's cultivated land have been polluted, with contaminated water being used to irrigate a further 32.5 million mu (21,670 square kilometres) and another 2 million mu (1,300 square kilometres) covered or destroyed by solid waste. In total, the area accounts for one-tenth of China's cultivatable land, and is mostly in economically developed areas. An estimated 12 million tonnes of grain are contaminated by heavy metals every year, causing direct losses of 20 billion yuan ($2.57 billion USD). Recent survey shows that 19% of the agricultural soils are contaminated with heavy metals and metalloids, and the rate of contamination still increases dramatically. China established a series of soil pollution remediation systems under the Chinese Soil Pollution Prevention and Control Law which still remain to be improved because of imperfect remediation standards and insufficient public participation.

=== European Union ===
According to the received data from member states in 2012, in the European Union the number of estimated potential contaminated sites was more than 2.5 million and the identified contaminated sites around 342 thousand . Municipal and industrial wastes contributed most to soil contamination (38%), followed by the industrial/commercial sector (34%). Mineral oil and heavy metals were the main contaminants contributing around 60% to soil contamination. In terms of budget, the management of contaminated sites was estimated to cost around 6 billion Euros (€) annually. The EU's Soil Monitoring Law, entered into force on 16 December 2025, protects and restores soils, ensuring that they are used sustainably.

=== United Kingdom ===
Generic guidance commonly used in the United Kingdom are the Soil Guideline Values published by the Department for Environment, Food and Rural Affairs (DEFRA) and the Environment Agency. These are screening values that demonstrate the minimal acceptable level of a substance. Above this there can be no assurances in terms of significant risk of harm to human health. These have been derived using the Contaminated Land Exposure Assessment Model (CLEA UK). Certain input parameters such as Health Criteria Values, age and land use are fed into CLEA UK to obtain a probabilistic output.

Guidance by the Inter Departmental Committee for the Redevelopment of Contaminated Land (ICRCL) has been formally withdrawn in 2002 by the DEFRA, for use as a prescriptive document to determine the potential need for remediation or further assessment.

The CLEA model published by DEFRA and the Environment Agency (EA) in March 2002, updated in September 2009, sets a framework for the appropriate assessment of risks to human health from contaminated land, as required by Part IIA of the Environmental Protection Act 1990. As part of this framework, generic Soil Guideline Values (SGVs) have currently been derived for ten contaminants to be used as "intervention values". These values should not be considered as remedial targets but values above which further detailed assessment should be considered.

Three sets of CLEA SGVs have been produced for three different land uses, namely

- residential (with and without plant uptake)
- allotments
- commercial/industrial

It was intended that the SGVs replace the former ICRCL values. The CLEA SGVs relate to assessing chronic (long term) risks to human health and do not apply to the protection of ground workers during construction, or other potential receptors such as groundwater, buildings, plants or other ecosystems. The CLEA SGVs are not directly applicable to a site completely covered in hardstanding, as there is no direct exposure route to contaminated soils.

To date, fifteen of fifty-five contaminant SGVs have been published, for the following: arsenic, cadmium, chromium, lead, mercury, nickel, selenium, benzene, ethyl benzene, phenol, xylene, toluene, dioxines, furanes, and dioxin-like PCBs. Toxicological data (Tox) has been published for each of these contaminants as well as for benzo(a)pyrene, naphthalene, vinyl chloride, 1,1,2,2 tetrachloroethane and 1,1,1,2 tetrachloroethane, 1,1,1 trichloroethane, tetrachloroethene, carbon tetrachloride, 1,2-dichloroethane, and trichloroethene. The SGVs for ethyl benzene, phenol and toluene are dependent on the soil organic matter (SOM) content (which can be calculated from the total organic carbon (TOC) content). As an initial screen the SGVs for 1% SOM are considered to be appropriate.

=== Canada ===
As of July 2025, there are a total of 24,000 plus contaminated sites in Canada, of which more than 19,000 have been closed after historical reviews, testing, clean-ups or long-term monitoring activities determined that no further action was required. One infamous contaminated sited is located near a nickel-copper smelting site in Sudbury, Ontario. A study investigating the heavy metal pollution in the vicinity of the smelter reveals that elevated levels of nickel and copper were found in the soil; values going as high as 5,104ppm Ni, and 2,892 ppm Cu within a 1.1 km range of the smelter location. Other metals were also found in the soil; such metals include iron, cobalt, and silver. Furthermore, upon examining the different vegetation surrounding the smelter it was evident that they too had been affected; the results show that the plants contained nickel, copper and aluminium as a result of soil contamination. Soil quality guidelines have been published for 32 soil contaminants.

=== India ===
In March 2009, the issue of uranium poisoning in Punjab attracted press coverage. It was alleged to be caused by fly ash ponds of thermal power stations, which reportedly lead to severe birth defects in children in the Faridkot and Bhatinda districts of Punjab. The news reports claimed the uranium levels were more than 60 times the maximum safe limit. Out of total 140 samples collected and analyzed in south-west Punjab, 76% have uranium levels greater than the chemical toxicity limit of World Health Organization (WHO, 30 μg.L−1) and 34% samples have concentration higher than the radiological toxicity limit given by Atomic Energy Regulatory Board (AERB, 60 μg.L−1). Research is underway to identify natural or other sources for the uranium. A study suggested that prolonged application of uranium-containing fertilizers could have contributed to its enhanced concentration in the soil, while a more recent study rather suggested that a complex interplay of hydrogeochemical processes under monsoonal influence could have played a decisive role in uranium mobility and contamination of groundwater above tolerated thresholds.

== See also ==
- Bioremediation
- Bioswale
- Constructed wetland
- Contamination control
- Dutch pollutant standards
- Ecological sanitation
- Environmental policy in China#Soil pollution
- GIS in environmental contamination
- Groundwater pollution
- Groundwater remediation
- Habitat destruction
- Index of waste management articles
- Land degradation
- Landfill
- List of solid waste treatment technologies
- List of waste management companies
- Litter
- Nanoremediation
- Pesticide drift
- Plasticulture
- Plastic-eating organisms
- Remediation of contaminated sites with cement
- Triangle of death (Italy)
- Water pollution
