= C8H6O =

The molecular formula C_{8}H_{6}O (molar mass: 118.13 g/mol, exact mass: 118.0419 u) may refer to:

- Benzofuran
- Isobenzofuran, or 2-Benzofuran
