= Phototoxic tar dermatitis =

Skin condition

Phototoxic tar dermatitis results from coal tar, creosote, crude coal tar, or pitch, in conjunction with sunlight exposure, which induces a sunburn reaction associated with severe burning sensation.

== See also ==
- Skin lesion
