= BJF =

BJF, BjF or bjf may refer to:

- Benzo(j)fluoranthene, an organic compound with the chemical formula C20H12
- BJF, the IATA code for Båtsfjord Airport, Norway
- BJF, the station code for Bjørnfjell Station, Narvik, Norway
- bjf, the ISO 639-3 code for Jewish Neo-Aramaic dialect of Barzani, Kurdistan
