= C8H6O2 =

The molecular formula C_{8}H_{6}O_{2} (molar mass: 134.13 g/mol, exact mass: 134.0368 u) may refer to:

- 1,4-Benzodioxine
- 2-Cumaranone
- Isophthalaldehyde
- Phenylglyoxal
- Phthalaldehyde
- Phthalide
- Terephthalaldehyde
