= Isobenzofuran =

- Skeletal formula

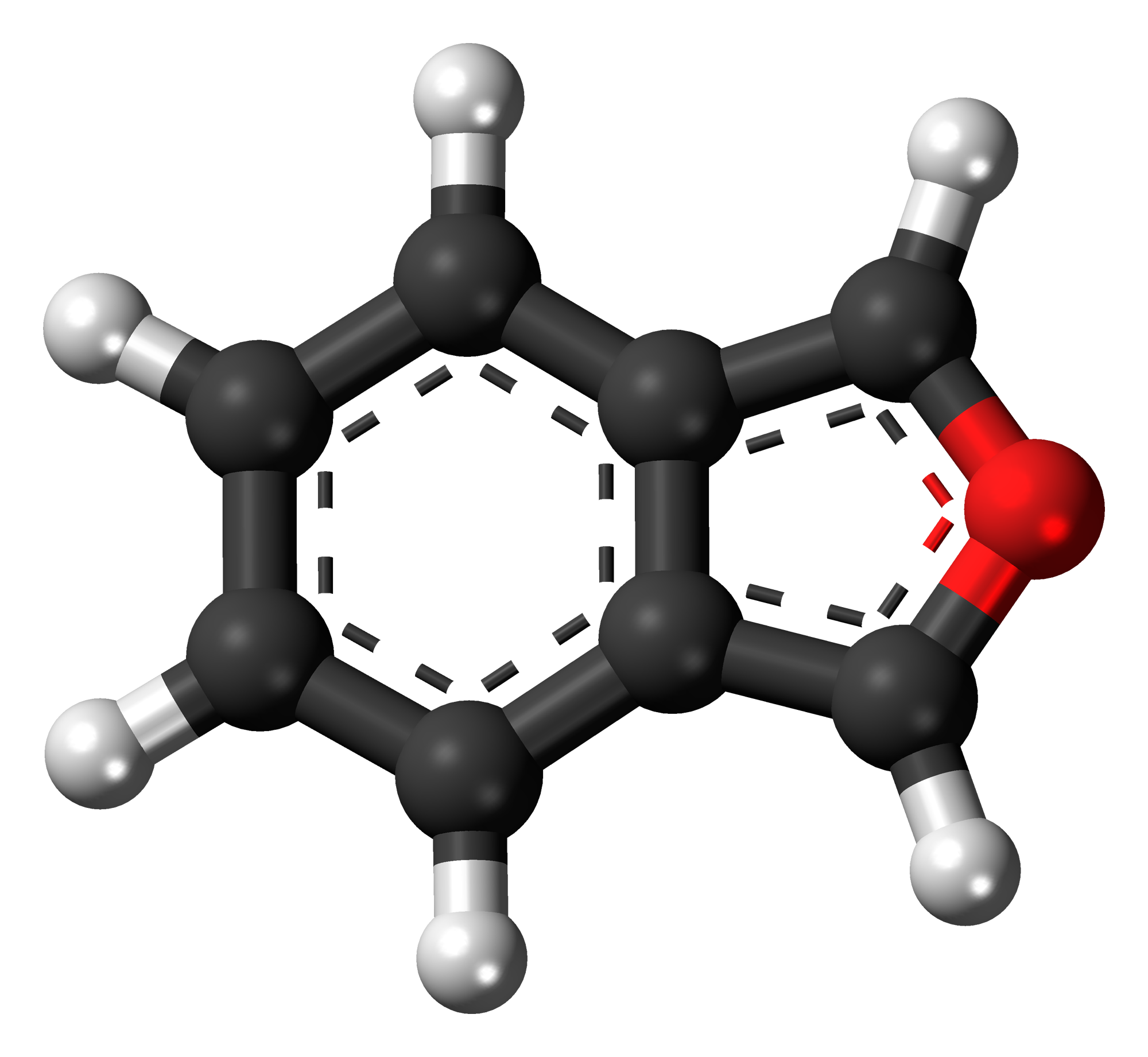
- Ball-and-stick model

Names
- Preferred IUPAC name 2-Benzofuran
- Other names 2-Oxa-2H-isoindene; Benzo[c]furan

Identifiers
CAS Number	270-75-7
3D model (JSmol)	Interactive image
ChEBI	CHEBI:35261
ChemSpider	9553388
PubChem CID	11378474
UNII	9T5PJS6W2B
CompTox Dashboard (EPA)	DTXSID00943009
- InChI: InChI=1S/C8H6O/c1-2-4-8-6-9-5-7(8)3-1/h1-6H Key: UXGVMFHEKMGWMA-UHFFFAOYSA-N; InChI=1/C8H6O/c1-2-4-8-6-9-5-7(8)3-1/h1-6H Key: UXGVMFHEKMGWMA-UHFFFAOYAR
- SMILES: o2cc1ccccc1c2

Properties
Chemical formula	C_{8}H_{6}O
Molar mass	118.13 g/mol
- Except where otherwise noted, data are given for materials in their standard state (at 25 °C [77 °F], 100 kPa). verify (what is ?) Infobox references

Isobenzofuran is a bicyclic heterocycle consisting of fused cyclohexa-1,3-diene and furan rings. It is isomeric with benzofuran.

Isobenzofuran is highly reactive and rapidly polymerizes; however, it has been identified and prepared by thermolysis of suitable precursors and trapped at low temperature.

Though isobenzofuran itself is not stable, it is the parent of related stable compounds with more complex structures, such as the hindered analogue 1,3-diphenylisobenzofuran.
