= Benfuresate =

Identifiers
CAS Number	68505-69-1
3D model (JSmol)	Interactive image
ChEBI	CHEBI:81756
ChEMBL	ChEMBL2252194
ChemSpider	2298853
ECHA InfoCard	100.064.458
EC Number	270-925-4
KEGG	C18452
PubChem CID	3034378
UNII	5E3V59Y698
CompTox Dashboard (EPA)	DTXSID8058160
- InChI: InChI=1S/C12H16O4S/c1-4-17(13,14)16-9-5-6-11-10(7-9)12(2,3)8-15-11/h5-7H,4,8H2,1-3H3 Key: QGQSRQPXXMTJCM-UHFFFAOYSA-N
- SMILES: CCS(=O)(=O)OC1=CC2=C(C=C1)OCC2(C)C
- Except where otherwise noted, data are given for materials in their standard state (at 25 °C [77 °F], 100 kPa). Infobox references

Benfuresate is a herbicide belonging to the group of benzofurans.

== Properties ==
Studies on zebrafish have shown that benfuresate inhibits embryonic growth in this species and can induce malformations. These findings underscore the risks that herbicide exposure poses to aquatic organisms.

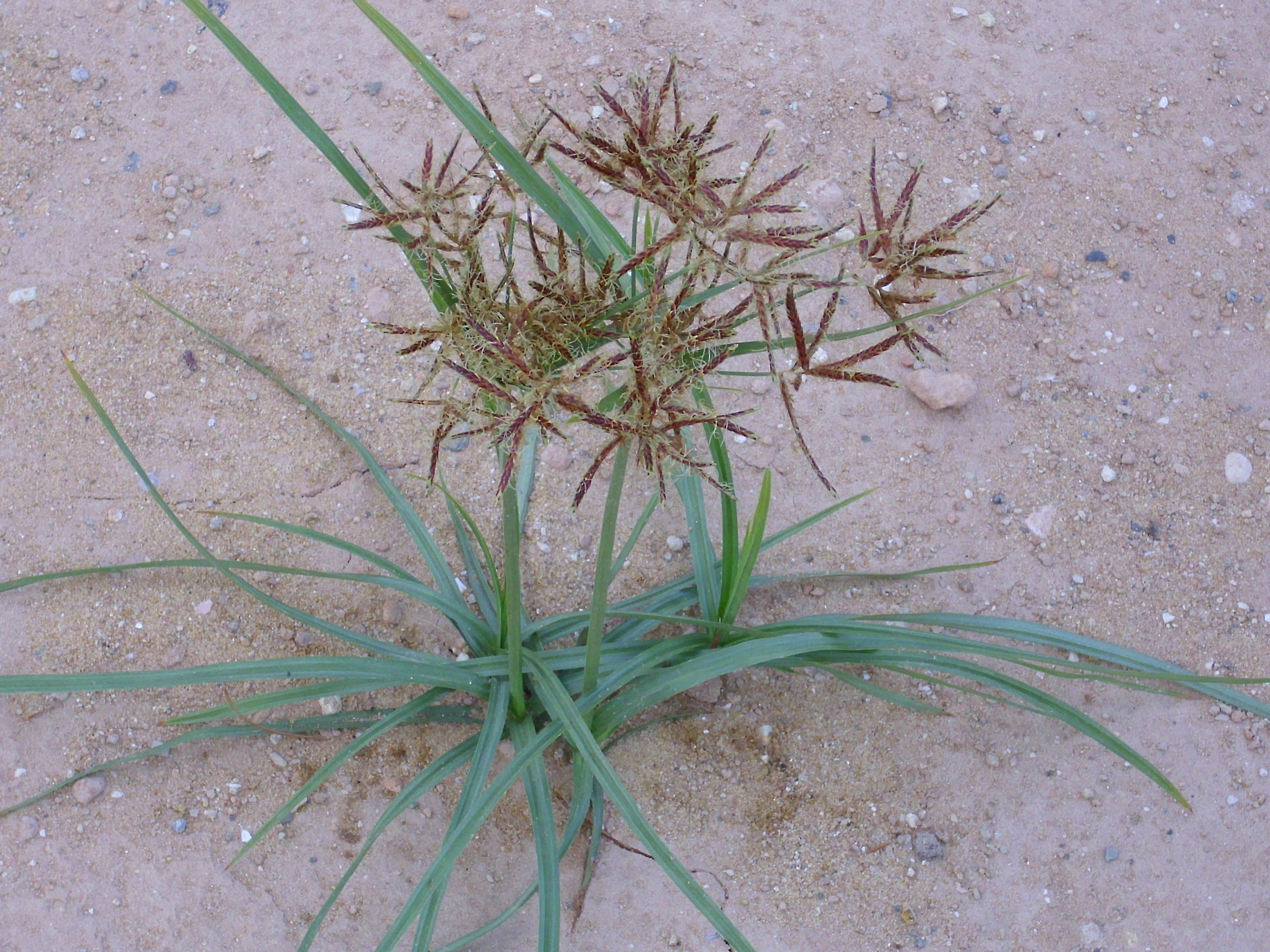
bulbous cypergrass

== Uses ==
Benfuresate is widely used post-emergence to control grasses and weeds, for example in rice, fruit, bean, corn and sugarcane cultivation. Before crop emergence, it is applied to cotton and tobacco plants.

Benfuresate controls cyperus rotundus in cotton. Young shoots appear to be more sensitive to benfuresate than the roots. While treatment of the leaves with benfuresate has little effect, it causes severe damage to the treated bud.

== Authorization ==
In the EU and Switzerland, crop protection products containing the active ingredient benfuresate are no longer authorized.

Benfuresate was authorized for use on cotton plants in Spain.

== Trade names ==
Cyperal, Morlene, Zerbex
