= Coal tar =

Chemical mixture

Clinical data
- Trade names: Balnetar, Cutar, others
- Other names: liquor carbonis detergens (LCD) liquor picis carbonis (LPC)
- AHFS/Drugs.com: Multum Consumer Information
- Routes of administration: Topical
- ATC code: D05AA (WHO)

Legal status
- Legal status: US: OTC / Rx-only

Identifiers
- CAS Number: 8007-45-2
- ChemSpider: none
- UNII: R533ESO2EC
- CompTox Dashboard (EPA): DTXSID1027683
- ECHA InfoCard: 100.029.417

Coal tar is a viscous dark liquid that is a by-product of deriving coke and coal gas from coal. Coal tar has long been a source of useful chemicals as well as a general wood preservative. Although not common, it is used topically for relief from some skin conditions.

== History ==
Coal tar has been produced since about 1665. Much later, in the production of coke and illumination gases ("town gas"), it was an undesirable byproduct. Soon it was found to be a source of solvents. Around 1850, it was discovered that it could be used as a source of many organic compounds. Its use as a precursor to dyes engendered an entire industry. In 1854 Frederick Crace Calvert, "an eminent English chemist", made the extraordinary statement before the Society of Arts that "ere long, some valuable dyeing substances would be prepared from coal." The first synthetic dye mauveine was obtained from impure aniline obtained from coal tar. It is also among the first chemical dyes to have been mass-produced. In a related case of serendipity, reaction of quinoline from coal tar led to the discovery of the cyanine dyes. In the latter case, the quinoline was contaminated by lepidine, an essential precursor to the dye.

Coal tar was used for medical purposes as early as the 1800s. Coal tar was a component of the first sealed roads. In its original development by Edgar Purnell Hooley, tarmac was tar covered with granite chips. Later the filler used was industrial slag.

== Economics ==
The value of the trade in coal tar is around US$20 billion per year (2023). As of 2011, 30M tons of coal tar were obtained per year, half of which was processed as a source of chemicals.

Some British companies included:

- Bonnington Chemical Works
- British Tar Products
- Lancashire Tar Distillers
- Midland Tar Distillers
- Newton, Chambers & Company (owners of Izal brand disinfectant)
- Sadlers Chemicals

== Production ==
Coal tar is produced through thermal destruction (pyrolysis or carbonization) of coal, usually with the objective of obtaining coke, which is heavily used in the production of iron and steel. The composition of coal tar varies with the process and type of coal used – lignite, bituminous or anthracite. Most commonly, bituminous coal is used. The tar is further processed, generating fractions of various applications. Coal tar is a black or dark brown liquid or a high-viscosity semi-solid.

== Uses ==
Coal tars have the following major uses:

- production of carbon-based electrodes for aluminium processing
- source of valuable organic compounds, including naphthalene, phenanthrene, acenaphthene, pyrene, carbazole, quinoline, phenols
- Wood preservatives
- resins for paints and coatings.

=== Chemical products ===
Coal tar is a major source of organic compounds. This application complements the petrochemical industry, which mainly produces alkanes and alkenes. It is a source of polycyclic aromatic hydrocarbons:

- 2-rings: coumarone, indene, benzofuran, naphthalene, methyl-naphthalenes and methylated derivatives thereof.
- 3-rings: acenaphthene, fluorene, phenanthrene.
- 4-rings: chrysene, pyrene, fluoranthene, triphenylene, naphthacene, benzanthracene
- 5-rings: picene, benzo[a]pyrene, benzo[e]pyrene, benzofluoranthenes, perylene
- 6- and 7-rings: dibenzopyrenes, dibenzofluoranthenes, benzoperylenes, coronene)
- phenols: phenol, cresols
- N-heterocycles: pyridine, picolines, carbazole, quinolines
- benzene, toluene, and xylenes ("BTX") plus cumenes 1,2,3-Trimethylbenzene occurs naturally in coal tar.

Many of these chemicals are precursors to dyes (notably tartrazine/Yellow #5), and photographic materials.

=== Specialty carbons ===
- As a source of carbon black.
- As a binder in manufacturing graphite; a considerable portion of the materials in "green blocks" is coke oven volatiles (COV). During the baking process of the green blocks as a part of commercial graphite production, most of the coal tar binders are vaporised and are generally burned in an incinerator to prevent release into the atmosphere, as COV and coal tar can be injurious to health.
- As a main component of the electrode paste used in electric arc furnaces. Coal tar pitch act as the binder for solid filler that can be either coke or calcined anthracite, forming electrode paste, also widely known as Söderberg electrode paste.
- As a feed stock for higher-value fractions, such as naphtha, creosote and pitch. In the coal gas era, companies distilled coal tar to separate these out, leading to the discovery of many industrial chemicals.

=== Construction and combustion ===
Only half of the coal tar is used for chemical production. The remaining ca. 15M tons are used for bulk applications. For example coal tar is incorporated into some parking-lot sealcoat products used to protect the structural integrity of the underlying pavement. Sealcoat products that are coal-tar based typically contain 20 to 35 percent coal-tar pitch. Research shows that it is used throughout the United States of America, but several areas have banned its use in sealcoat products, including the District of Columbia; Austin, Texas; Dane County, Wisconsin; the state of Washington; and several municipalities in Minnesota and others. From 2025, Canada has also banned its use in sealants.

Coal tar is also used in roofing.

Some coal tar is used as fuel for heating or to fire boilers. Like most heavy oils, it must be heated before it will flow easily.

=== Herbal medicine ===
==== Topical treatments ====
In rare herbal treatments, coal tar is used to provide relief from various skin disorders, such as dandruff, seborrheic dermatitis or psoriasis. Coal tar is generally available as a generic medication over the counter for external use only as a shampoo, gel, cream or ointment. User acceptance of coal tar for these treatments tends to be poor because it is extremely messy, stains skin and hair, and has a foul odor.

Although coal tar topical products have been used to treat childhood psoriasis, this is an uncommon clinical practice, with risk of cancer development existing from long-term treatment.

Adverse effects of using topical coal tar may include folliculitis, skin irritation, contact dermatitis, phototoxicity, and changes in skin pigmentation.

==== Potential toxicity ====
Use of coal tar on the skin increases the risk of skin cancer. Coal tar derivatives are contraindicated for people with the inherited red cell blood disorder glucose-6-phosphate dehydrogenase deficiency (G6PD deficiency), as they can cause oxidative stress leading to red blood cell disruption.

Coal tar is a skin irritant.

=== Cancer ===
Many of constituents of coal tar are polycyclic aromatic hydrocarbons, which can be carcinogenic.

The International Agency for Research on Cancer lists coal tars as Group 1 carcinogens, indicating a direct cause of cancer.

In response to public health concerns regarding the carcinogenicity of PAHs some municipalities, such as the city of Milwaukee, have banned the use of common coal tar-based road and driveway sealants, citing concerns of elevated PAH content in groundwater.

The residue from the distillation of high-temperature coal tar, primarily a complex mixture of three or more membered condensed ring aromatic hydrocarbons, is a substance of very high concern by the European Chemicals Agency.

=== Analgesic precursor ===
Some phenolic coal tar derivatives have analgesic (pain-killer) properties. These included acetanilide, phenacetin, and paracetamol.

== Regulation ==
The U.S. Occupational Safety and Health Administration (OSHA) has set the permissible exposure limit to 0.2 mg/m^{3} benzene-soluble fraction over an 8-hour workday. The U.S. National Institute for Occupational Safety and Health (NIOSH) has set a recommended exposure limit (REL) of 0.1 mg/m^{3} cyclohexane-extractable fraction over an 8-hour workday. At levels of 80 mg/m^{3}, coal tar pitch volatiles are immediately dangerous to life and health.

The use of coal tar in cosmetic products was forbidden in the European Union by a directive in 2009.

== See also ==
- Coal oil
- Coal Tar Research Association
- Wood tar
