= British Coal Utilisation Research Association =

British Coal Utilisation Research Association (BCURA) was a non-profit association of industrial companies, incorporated 23 April 1938 and dissolved 24 February 2015.

== History ==
It was founded in 1938, with an assured income of £25000 per year for five years, supplied by the Mining Association of Great Britain and a grant from the government Department of Scientific and Industrial Research, establishing a research station in West Brompton. It was formed from the research department of the Combustion (formerly Coal-burning) Appliance Manufacturer's Association becoming a separate entity. Laboratories were also later established in Leatherhead.

The first Director was John G. Bennett.

During the Second World War it developed small units for the manufacture of producer gas from coal to use in vehicles in place of petrol. A £1000,000 five-year programme was also begun with a view not only to the needs of wartime but also for industry afterwards with fuels and chemicals from coal and greater efficiency of domestic appliances.

Following the Nationalisation of the British Coal Industry in 1946 it continued as an independent body with the support of the National Coal Board in place of the Mining Association.

It developed the commercially successful Satchwell Automatic Controller for small-pipe heating systems.

As the National Coal Board became the dominant industrial member of the Association the government decided to run down its grant from 1968 and NCB would take over BCURA as a subsidiary, which it did in 1971. However NCB felt BCURAs's income from contracts was small compared with its running costs and decided to concentrate research on its own Coal Research Establishment at Stoke Orchard and to close BCURA in the same year. Some of the library stock is now in the North of England Institute of Mining and Mechanical Engineers collection at the Common Room of the Great North in Newcastle upon Tyne.

== Notable people ==
Rosalind Franklin worked on porosity of coal during World War II.

Victor Goldschmidt lectured on rare elements in coal ash during World War II.

Marcello Pirani was scientific consultant during 1941—1947, concerned with carbonaceous materials resistant to high temperatures.

Meredith Thring was there from the outset.

The family of John G. Bennett have a web site that contains information about him and BCURA

Peter H. Given, Head of Organic Chemistry, went on to Pennsylvania State University, achieving distinction in U.S.

BCURA activities were subject of a review published in Nature Volume 153 Number 3873 p 104 (22 January 1944).

== See Also ==
- Coal Tar Research Association
