= Coal Tar Research Association =

Coal tar research organisation in the UK

- Formation: 29 March 1949; 77 years ago
- Legal status: Dissolved on 12 March 2013
- Location: Leeds, UK

The Coal Tar Research Association (CTRA) was a British research organisation that worked to advance the understanding of, and uses for, coal tar. It was operational between March 1949 and March 2013.

== History ==
The Coal Tar Research Association (CTRA) was established in March 1949; it was based in Leeds. In the early 1950s, the CTRA had a reported income of roughly £90,000.

The CTRA performed research into the chemical uses for coal. During the 1950s, it was one of several organisations conducting research into the utilisation of domestic fuel resources. Amongst the various projects undertaken by the association were evaluations of new materials created from coal tar, studies into its use in road construction, purification techniques for crude anthracene, investigation into the isolation of phenanthrene from coal tar, the use of creosote as a wood preservative, and studies of coking practices. One area of particular attention was corrosion, which was attributed with causing £50,000 of expenses annually by the mid-1950s, and which the coal tar industry was keen to reduce if possible. On occasion, the CTRA secured patents based on its findings.

== See also ==
- British Coal Utilisation Research Association
