= Surfactant leaching (decontamination) =

Surfactant leaching is a method of water and soil decontamination, e.g., for oil recovery in petroleum industry. It involves mixing of contaminated water or soil with surfactants with the subsequent leaching of emulsified contaminants. In oil recovery, most common surfactant types are ethoxylated alcohols, ethoxylated nonylphenols, sulphates, sulphonates, and biosurfactants.
