= Contaminated land =

Contaminated land contains substances in or under the land that are definitively or potentially hazardous to health or the environment. These areas often have a long history of industrial production and industrial farming. Many sites may be affected by their former uses such as mining, industry, chemical and oil spills and waste disposal. Areas that were previously industrial areas, called brownfield sites, are higher risk areas.

Contamination can also occur naturally as a result of the geology of the area, or through agricultural use.

== Overview ==
Land can be contaminated by the following:

- heavy metals, such as arsenic, cadmium and lead
- oils and tars
- oil spills
- chemical substances and preparations, like solvents
- gases
- asbestos
- radioactive substances

== United Kingdom ==
A requirement was placed on all local authorities in England, Wales and Scotland to investigate potentially contaminated sites and, where necessary, ensure they are remediated by Part IIA of the Environmental Protection Act 1990, which was inserted by the Environment Act 1995

The regime in Part IIA did not apply to radioactive contamination, but section 78YC permitted Ministers to make regulations to apply Part IIA to such contamination. Such Regulations have been made.

The Waste and Contaminated Land (Northern Ireland) Order 2007 made similar provision for Northern Ireland

Recent proposals for reform of the UK's contaminated land legislation have included Zane's Law, first introduced as amendments to the Building Safety Bill in the House of Lords in 2022. The proposals would strengthen duties on local authorities relating to the identification and assessment of contaminated land and have subsequently been developed alongside proposals for a Clean Land (Human Rights) Bill, intended as companion legislation to the Clean Air (Human Rights) Bill.

=== Legal definition ===
Section 78A(2) of the Environmental Protection Act 1990 defines "Contaminated Land" as:

“Contaminated land” is any land which appears to the local authority in whose area it is situated to be in such a condition, by reason of substances in, on or under the land, that—

(a) significant harm is being caused or there is a significant possibility of such harm being caused; or
(b) significant pollution of controlled waters is being caused, or there is a significant possibility of such pollution being caused;

The Contaminated Land Report (CLR) series of documents have been produced by the Department for Environment, Food and Rural Affairs (DEFRA) and the Environment Agency, to provide regulators with "relevant, appropriate, authoritative and scientifically based information and advice on the assessment of risk from contamination in soils".

The Environment Agency has issued a number of Soil Guideline Values (SGVs) which, whilst non-binding, may be used as guidance in the environmental risk assessment of land and in setting remediation targets. They should only be applied to human health assessments.

=== The process ===
Assessment of contaminated land in the UK is predominantly undertaken under the planning system. The National Planning Policy Framework (NPPF) sets out that, following development, a site should not be capable of being determined as ‘contaminated land’ under Part IIA of the Environmental Protection Act. In addition, the risks from contamination should be assessed within the context of a site's end-use and upon completion, the site should be ‘suitable’ for its new use.

A technical framework for identifying and dealing with land affected by contamination is detailed within DEFRA and Environment Agency guidance entitled Model Procedures for the Management of Land Contamination (CLR11). The process can broadly be divided into three stages: risk assessment, remedial options appraisal, and implementation of remediation.

==== Risk assessment ====
A 'phased approach' to risk assessment is encouraged within CLR11 and should typically include the following:

1. Preliminary Risk Assessment – Also known as a Phase 1 Preliminary Risk Assessment, or Desk Study, this work involves the collection and review of many different sources of information including: local authority registers, environmental databases, geological maps, and historic records. A site walkover is usually also undertaken to identify any specific sources of contamination and to collect relevant photographs. This information is compiled to produce a Conceptual Site Model (CSM). There are three essential elements to the concept of risk in the context of land contamination, which combine to form a ‘contaminant linkage’. In order for a contaminant linkage to be active, a source, pathway, and receptor must all be present.
2. Site Investigation – This work should meet the criteria set out in British Standard 10175 entitled Investigation of Potentially Contaminated Sites - Code of Practice. It can typically involve completion of boreholes or trial pits and collection of soil or groundwater samples for submission to an appropriately accredited laboratory.
3. Generic/Detailed Risk Assessment – This process involves assessment of contaminant concentrations in the context of the site's proposed end use. Assessment can be either generic (using predefined assessment criteria) or detailed (taking into account a number of site and receptor-specific factors).

==== Remedial options appraisal ====
Should the risk assessment demonstrate that unacceptable risks to human health or the surrounding environment are likely to exist, then some remedial work will be necessary. This process involves three key stages:

1. Identification of Remedial Options – A short-list of feasible remediation options, capable of achieving the remedial targets should be drawn up.
2. Remedial Options Appraisal – Each remedial option should be reviewed on its merits and drawbacks. Site-specific information should be considered along with the timescale and sustainability of each option.
3. Development of Remedial Strategy – A remedial method statement should be produced, which sets out how the remedial work will be implemented.

==== Implementation of the remedial strategy ====
Once the remedial strategy has been approved by relevant regulatory authorities then it should be implemented. A verification report should be produced upon completion of the work to demonstrate that remedial targets have been achieved. This work may include testing of remedial excavations, results of post-remedial monitoring, certification for imported material or membrane integrity testing, amongst other things. Details of ongoing/long-term monitoring may also need to be agreed at this stage, possibly under a Section 106 Agreement.

Upon completion of this process, the site should not pose a significant risk to future users or the surrounding environment and should be suitable for its end use. Once this process of site assessment has been completed successfully then any associated planning conditions can be discharged.

== Germany ==
=== Legal definition ===
In Germany, Section §2 of the Bundes-Bodenschutzgesetz (Federal Soil Protection Act, BBodSchG) contains the following legal definition:

"Contaminated sites within the meaning of this Act are

1. disused waste disposal facilities and other sites where waste has been treated, stored or deposited (old deposits), and
2. sites of decommissioned facilities and other sites where environmentally hazardous substances have been handled, with the exception of facilities whose decommissioning requires a permit under the Atomic Energy Act (old sites), which cause harmful soil changes or other hazards to individuals or the general public."

Not every case of soil contamination is a contaminated site. If there are indications of contamination, for example due to use by an environmentally relevant business or the filling of a gravel pit with undocumented material, the area is initially designated as a suspected contaminated site and investigated in more detail. To this end, a service provider is usually commissioned to carry out a detailed historical survey of the land use and to clarify the pollutant content of suspicious areas of land by means of drilling and chemical analysis. Section 3 BBodSchG excludes certain specified substances (radioactive substances, explosive ordnance) from the scope of the Act.

Due to a lack of documentation, it is often impossible to determine whether an existing contaminated site was originally created based on a permit issued at the time or whether it is an illegal waste dump – especially since there were significantly fewer safety requirements in the past regarding waste disposal or chemical processing. This difference is irrelevant to the definition of the term 'contaminated site'.

The classification as a suspected contaminated site or contaminated site is made by the local authority responsible under state law, such as the district government or the district administration. Classification as a contaminated site means that this area poses a hazard. This must be addressed through appropriate soil remediation measures.

== Classification as contaminated site and recording ==
The identification of suspected contaminated sites is well advanced in Germany; more than 360,000 sites have been identified and documented in contaminated site registers held by the district authorities. The initial identification was generally based on historical research, in which companies with activities suspected of causing contamination and former sand or gravel pits were identified. A confirmed suspicion of contamination generally leads to a loss in value of the property so that, at the latest, when a change of use is planned, or the property is intended for sale, there is a need to clarify the suspicion with suitable investigations. Many contaminated site investigations are therefore triggered in the course of land recycling.

The investigation is regulated by the Bundesbodenschutzgesetz and the Bundes-Bodenschutzverordnung and is carried out in a staggered sequence:

1. Sampling-free recording in the presence of an indication (old industrial wasteland as a suspected contaminated site) by inspection, file research in the company or at the authorities, if necessary aerial image evaluation or evaluation of other sources.
2. Preliminary investigation (Section 12 BBodSchV): an initial investigation by means of penetration testing in suspected hot spots or in a wide grid over the area to be investigated. The evaluation is based on the test values of the Federal Soil Protection and Contaminated Sites Ordinance (BBodSchV) for the sampling location or assessment location.
3. If the suspicion is confirmed by a violation of the test values, a detailed investigation (Section 13 BBodSchV) is carried out: The horizontal and vertical extent of the damage is investigated with the aim of enabling a final risk assessment. Groundwater investigations may also be carried out if necessary. If the contamination identified in the preliminary investigation turns out to be only a localised exceedance, the suspected site is not automatically reclassified as a contaminated site.

If the investigations and forecasts (seepage water forecast) show that the test values are not exceeded, the suspicion of harmful soil contamination or contamination from previous use is dispelled. If the test values are exceeded, it must be examined on a case-by-case basis to what extent remediation, protection or restriction measures within the meaning of §2 (7) and (8) of the Federal Soil Protection Act are necessary. For this purpose, the following are required:

1. possible remediation or safety procedures must be weighed against each other in terms of feasibility and expected costs, and
2. a remediation investigation must be carried out for a preferred procedure selected as a result of the weighing process (phases 3a and b). The results are then used to
3. develop a remediation plan with specific time and cost specifications.

=== Impact pathways ===
Pollutants from contaminated sites can reach humans in various ways and thus endanger their health or even their lives. In Germany, the test and action values according to the Bundes-Bodenschutz- und Altlastenverordnung (Federal Soil Protection and Contaminated Sites Ordinance) apply to the following impact pathways:

1. Impact pathway Soil-Groundwater: Drinking water is obtained from groundwater and feeds into surface water.
2. Impact pathway soil-cultivated plants: Cultivated plants absorb the pollutants via their roots and store them in tubers (potatoes, beetroot) or leaves (lettuce, spinach, cabbage). Fruit and leaves are contaminated by dust stirred up from the soil.
3. Impact pathway soil-humans: Humans come into contact with contaminated soil or absorb the pollutants via the lungs (dust in the air), the skin (gardening) or the gastrointestinal tract (small children who eat soil).

== Austria ==
=== Legal definition ===
In Austria, § 2 of the Altlastensanierungsgesetz (Contaminated Sites Remediation Act) defines:

1. Altablagerungen (Old deposits) are deposits where waste was deposited, either with or without authorisation, before 1 July 1989.
2. Altstandorte (Old sites) are sites of facilities where pollutants were handled in more than insignificant quantities before 1 July 1989.
3. Altlasten (Contaminated sites) are old deposits or old sites that are significantly contaminated or pose significant risks to humans or the environment.

Contamination caused by emissions into the air (air pollutants) is not subject to the scope of the Act, but to the Air Emissions Act 2018 (EG-L).

According to the usual interpretation, the term 'contaminated site' refers to sites that were contaminated before this law came into force (1 July 1989) and were entered in the Altlastenatlas (Contaminated Sites Atlas, public register; Altlastenatlas-Verordnung, BGBL. II. No. 232/2004).

Other contaminated areas are commonly referred to as Neuschäden (New damages) and are clearly distinguished from the term ‘contaminated site’.

The reason for this is that the law is primarily aimed at financing the remediation or securing of contaminated sites, i.e. it deals with questions of liability of the former operator or landowner (polluter and property owner liability) because ultimately, the federal government is liable for the remediation (Section 18 ALSAG; the competent authority is the provincial governor). Since the law came into force, there has been a clear regulation in place; in particular, the contribution of contaminated sites in waste management ensures that financing is also secured in the event of the operator company being liquidated. The close link between contaminated site remediation and land recycling is to be further strengthened with the 2019 amendment to the ALSAG.

== Classification as contaminated site and recording ==
In Austria, there are around 70,000 known contaminated sites and deposits, but only around 2% to 3% of these constitute contaminated sites within the meaning of the Contaminated Sites Remediation Act that were created before 1 July 1989. As of 1 January 2019, 304 contaminated sites were listed in the Contaminated Sites Atlas maintained by the Federal Environment Agency, of which 164 have been remediated or secured, and 1,895 sites are listed in the register of suspected contaminated sites and still require investigation.

ince the Contaminated Sites Remediation Act came into force, 10 million tonnes of contaminated deposits and subsoil material have been removed, and a total area of more than 1,000 hectares has been remediated.

== Switzerland ==
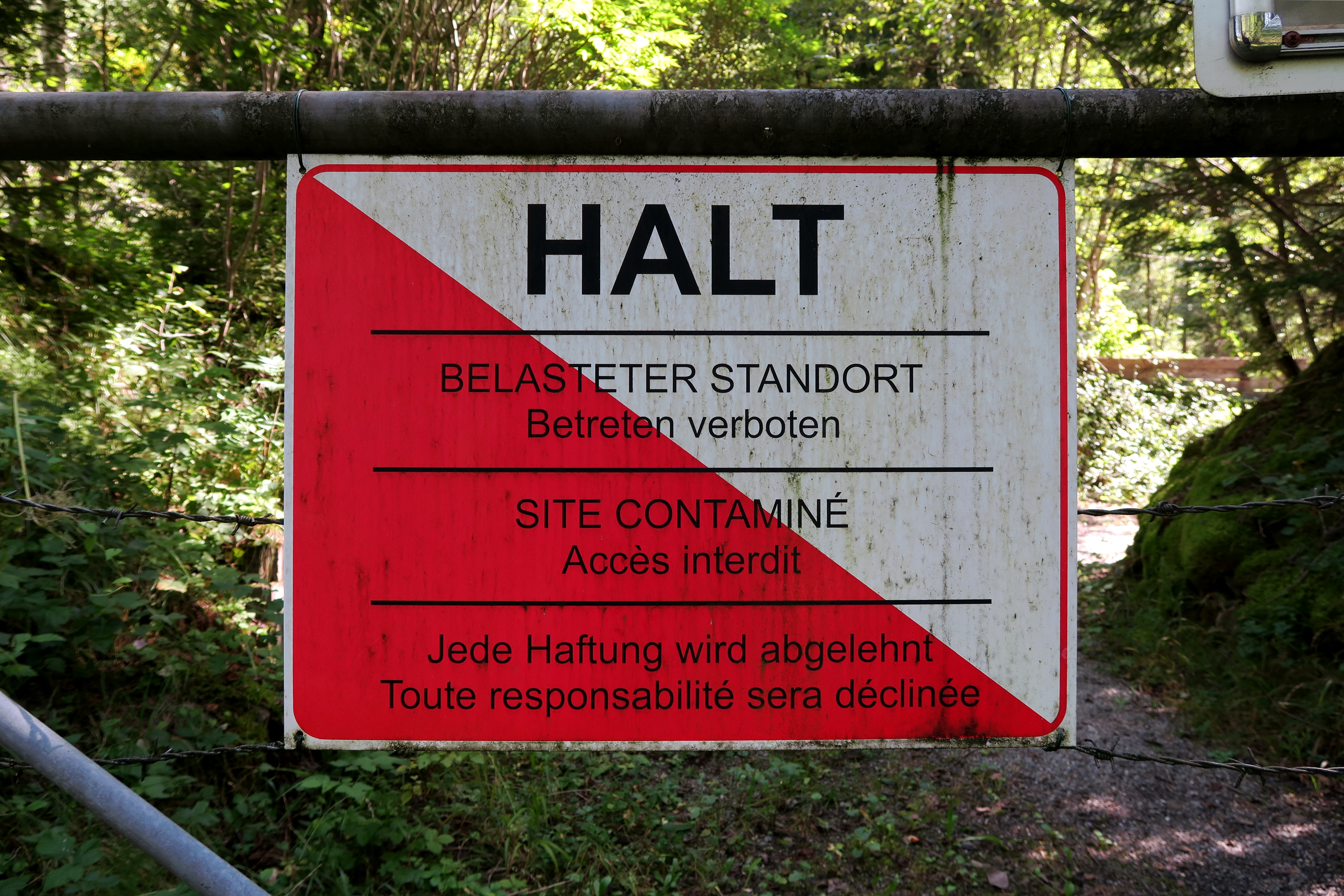
Warning sign

=== Legal definition ===
In Switzerland, the principles governing the obligation to remediate contaminated sites (deposits (landfills), industrial and accident sites) are laid down in Articles 32c to 32e of the Umweltschutzgesetzes (Environmental Protection Act) and in detail in the Verordnung über die Sanierung von belasteten Standorten (Altlasten-Verordnung, AltlV) (Ordinance on the Remediation of Contaminated Sites (Contaminated Sites Ordinance)) of 26 August 1998. In Article 2(3) (Definitions), the latter defines contaminated sites as:

"Altlasten sind sanierungsbedürftige belastete Standorte." (Contaminated sites are polluted locations that require remediation).

Such contamination can arise via the air, e.g. as dust, deposits or seepage of harmful substances.

The Contaminated Sites Ordinance distinguishes between Ablagerungsstandorte (deposit sites, disused or still operational landfills and other waste disposal sites), Betriebsstandorte (operational sites, disused or still operational facilities where environmentally hazardous substances have been handled, including shooting ranges and sites), and Unfallstandorte (accident sites) (Art. 2 Z. 1 AltlV). Swiss law, therefore, does not distinguish between historical 'old' contamination and facilities that are still in operation but emphasises the operational safety of the latter. A distinction is made between contaminated sites requiring remediation and builder contamination, where remediation is only required when the land is reused or new buildings are constructed (with different rules on who bears the costs of remediation measures).

Contaminated sites are classified according to recognised protected assets (air, surface and ground water, soil fertility, directly affected human and animal health) as sites requiring remediation (and therefore also requiring monitoring), sites requiring monitoring only (without the need for remediation outside of construction measures) and sites requiring neither remediation nor monitoring. Large-scale pollutant emissions, such as dust along busy roads or agricultural treatment with copper-containing plant protection products in vineyards, which was common in the past, or heavy metal-containing sewage sludge used as soil fertiliser, do not expressly constitute contamination and therefore do not constitute contaminated sites under contaminated sites law.

In general, the polluter pays principle applies to the remediation of contaminated sites. Under certain circumstances, however, the authorities may, as a further development of the Störerprinzip (disturber principle) of the Swiss police, oblige third parties such as the Zustandsstörer (disturber of the condition, e.g. the property owner) to take measures instead of the polluter (behavioural disturber), or take these measures themselves (substitute performance).

On the basis of the Verordnung über die Abgabe zur Sanierung von Altlasten (Ordinance on the Levy for the Remediation of Contaminated Sites, VASA), a landfill tax is levied on the transfer of waste to a landfill. The revenue from this incentive tax is appropriated for the investigation of contaminated sites and the remediation of contaminated sites. The amount of the levy varies according to the type of landfill.

=== Classification as contaminated site and recording ===
In Switzerland, the Kataster der belasteten Standorte (cadastre of contaminated sites) has been compiled since the late 1990s. It is jointly operated by the federal government and the cantons at the Bundesamt für Umwelt (Federal Office for the Environment, BAFU).

There are a total of around 38,000 contaminated sites, of which around 4,000 are likely to require remediation ('contaminated sites' within the meaning of the law). Just under 40% of all contaminated sites are disposal sites, just under 50% are industrial sites, around 10% are shooting ranges and around 1% are accident sites. The investigations are not yet complete; investigations into environmental impacts are ongoing at a total of 5,700 sites or will be started in the next few years. Around 2% of all sites are already being monitored, and 5% require remediation.

The total area of all contaminated sites recorded is around 225 km2 (equivalent to the area of the canton of Zug). The majority (two thirds) are located in the densely populated Mittelland region, one seventh (14%) in the Swiss Jura, and the remaining quarter (23%) is spread across the rest of Switzerland.
