= Soil guideline value =

Soil pollution metric used in the UK

Soil Guideline Values (SGVs) are figures which are used in non-statutory technical guidance for assessors carrying out risk assessments to determine whether land is considered "contaminated" under United Kingdom law, that is "land which appears to... be in such a condition, by reason of substances in, on or under the land, that (a) significant harm is being caused or there is a significant possibility of such harm being caused..."

This guidance stipulates three stages in such risk assessments:

1. Preliminary qualitative assessment including development of conceptual site model
2. Generic Quantitative Risk Assessment (GQRA)
3. Detailed Quantitative Risk Assessment (DQRA)

Soil Guideline Values are used in the second stage, GQRA, to determine whether harm caused by long-term exposure to a given soil concentration of chemicals may present an unacceptable risk to human health in some generic land-use scenario. The SGVs are therefore conservative estimates for a given scenario. Exceedance of a SGV does not confirm that there is a "significant possibility of significant harm", merely that the possibility exists and therefore more detailed, site-specific investigation of contaminants present, pathways and receptors is required.

== Derivation and relationship to Generic Assessment Criteria ==
SGVs are derived by the Environment Agency using the CLEA model (which can also be customised or used for DQRA). However, there are no currently valid SGVs for many important and common elements, such as copper, zinc, lead or chromium. The only body mandated to produce these values is the Environment Agency, following extensive consultation with other government departments.

In lieu of such figures, equivalent values known as "Generic Assessment Criteria" (GAC) may be calculated by any individual or organisation, starting from toxicity and relevant data and using the CLEA model, just as the Environment Agency calculates SGVs. SGVs are in fact GAC derived and published by the environment agency. For example, a range of GACs for more complex chemicals has been calculated and been made publicly available by charity CL:AIRE, with input from a range of authoritative sources including the Environment Agency. That said, GACs are not always openly published, as deriving them is a complex matter and thus these values do hold commercial value for consultancies who have undertaken such calculations.

== Scenarios and inherent assumptions ==
There are three generic land-use scenarios for which SGVs are published, and most derivations of GACs also follow these scenarios:

- a residential setting, with a two-storey small terraced house where the most vulnerable "critical" receptor of the contamination is a female child of zero to six years old, spending most of their time in or close to home
- an allotment consisting of open space where vegetables may be grown, with the same critical receptor
- a commercial three-storey office where the critical receptor is a working female adult aged 16–65 years old and exposed for a working lifetime of 49 years for 45 hours per week.

SGVs and GACs derived from these scenarios may only be used if the scenarios apply exactly or otherwise it is clearly demonstrated that the scenarios are more conservative than the real-world situation. For example, in the case of a playing field, it could be argued that the residential scenario is suitably conservative:

- the critical receptor (for the playing field) is likely to be older (than that for the residential case) therefore with a higher body mass and perhaps less likely to directly ingest soil
- exposure times at the playing field will be far lower than at a residential site
- the presumed absence of a building would likely reduce the possibility of vapour and dust build up
- it is unlikely for vegetables to be grown on the playing field
- all possible pathways are considered within the residential scenario

== See also ==
- Soil contamination
