= Benzofuran =

Heterocyclic compound consisting of fused benzene and furan rings

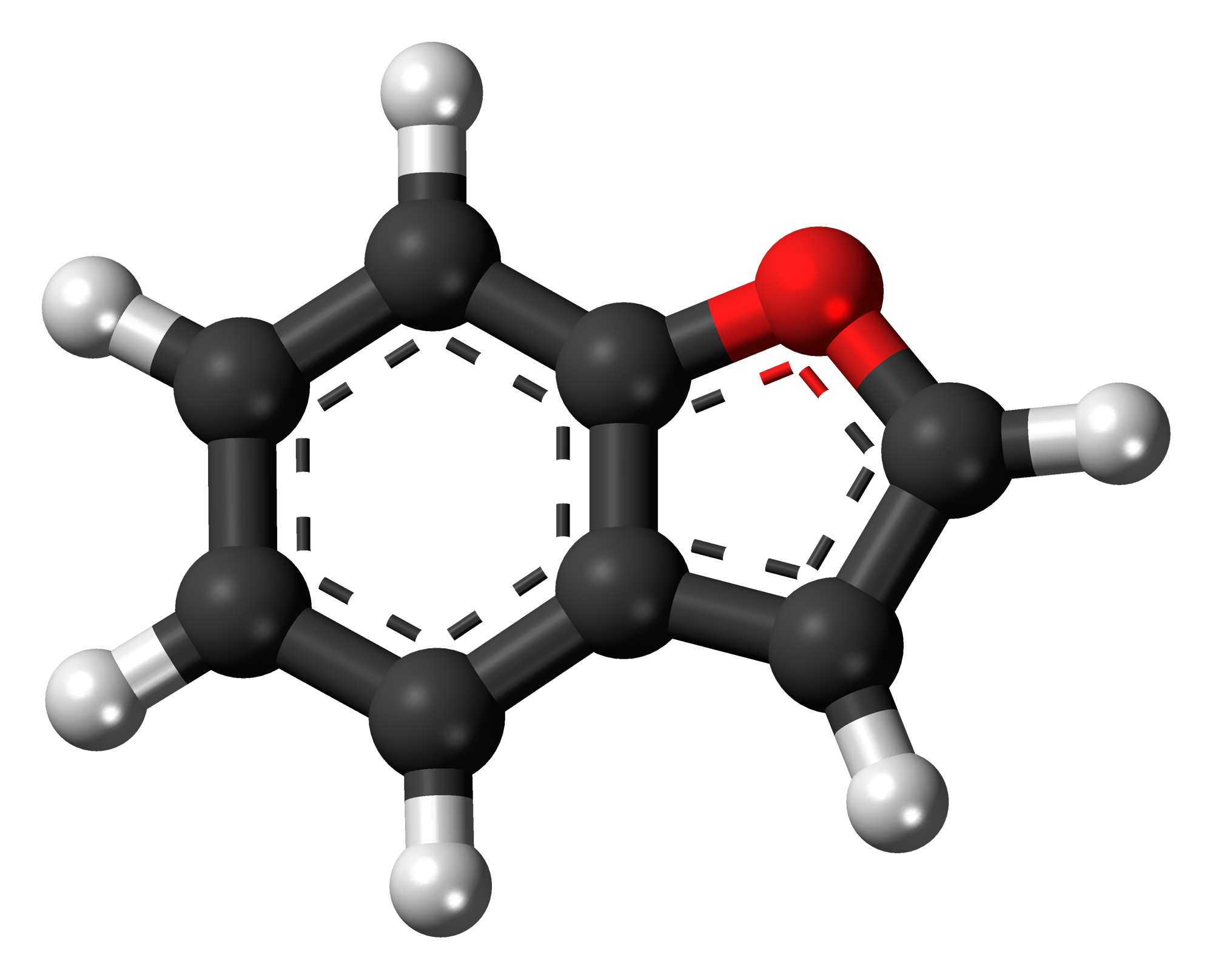

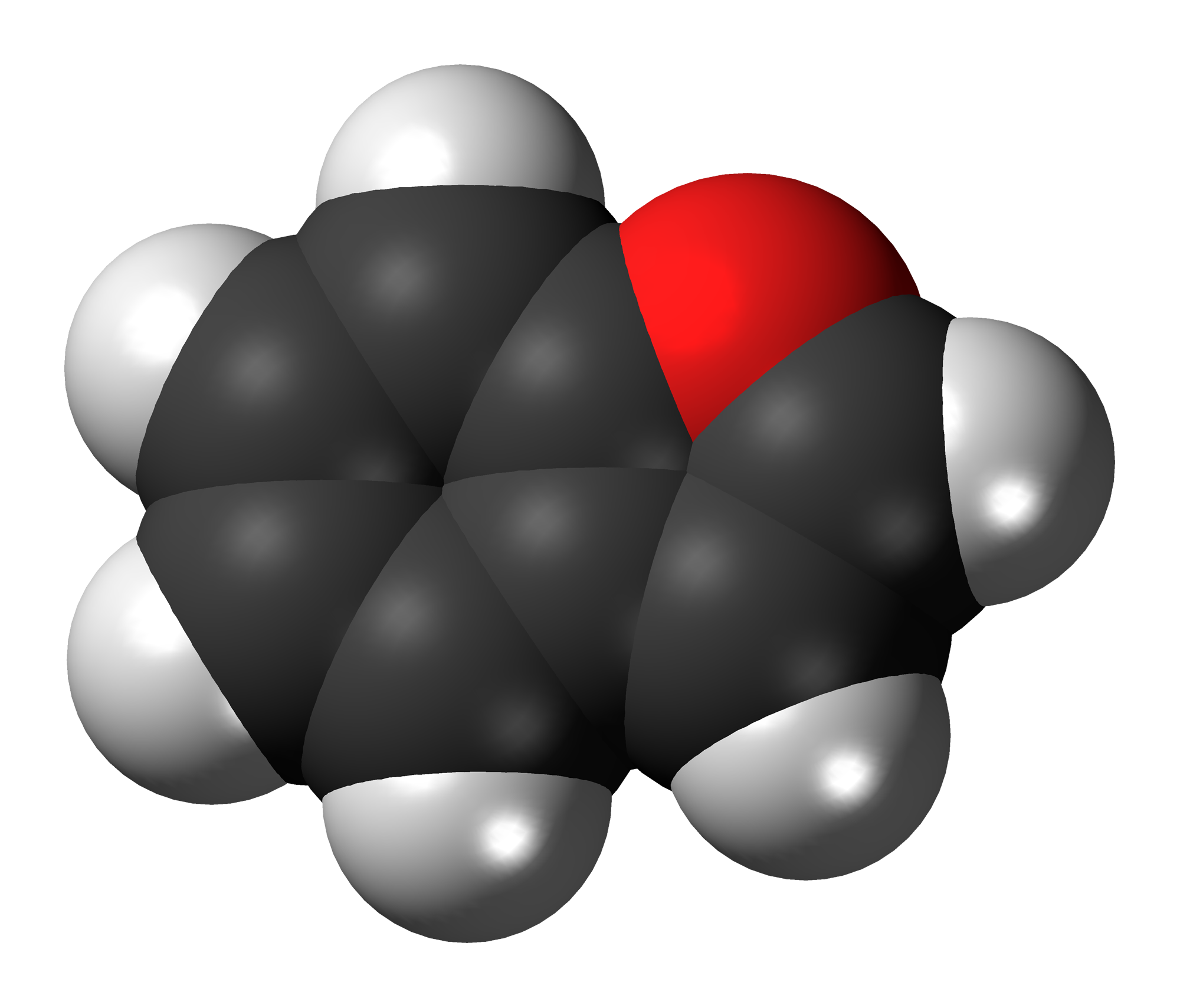

Names
- Preferred IUPAC name 1-Benzofuran
- Other names Benzofuran; Coumarone; Benzo[b]furan

Identifiers
| CAS Number | 271-89-6 |
| 3D model (JSmol) | Interactive image |
| Beilstein Reference | 107704 |
| ChEBI | CHEBI:35260 |
| ChEMBL | ChEMBL363614 |
| ChemSpider | 8868 |
| DrugBank | DB04179 |
| ECHA InfoCard | 100.005.439 |
| EC Number | 205-982-6 |
| Gmelin Reference | 260881 |
| KEGG | C14512 |
| PubChem CID | 9223 |
| RTECS number | DF6423800 |
| UNII | LK6946W774 |
| UN number | 1993 |
| CompTox Dashboard (EPA) | DTXSID6020141 |
- InChI: InChI=1S/C8H6O/c1-2-4-8-7(3-1)5-6-9-8/h1-6H Key: IANQTJSKSUMEQM-UHFFFAOYSA-N; InChI=1/C8H6O/c1-2-4-8-7(3-1)5-6-9-8/h1-6H Key: IANQTJSKSUMEQM-UHFFFAOYAU
- SMILES: o2c1ccccc1cc2

Properties
| Chemical formula | C_{8}H_{6}O |
| Molar mass | 118.135 g·mol^{−1} |
| Melting point | −18 °C (0 °F; 255 K) |
| Boiling point | 173 °C (343 °F; 446 K) |

Hazards
- GHS labelling
| Pictograms | (GHS02: Flammable) (GHS08: Health hazard) |
| Signal word | Warning |
| Hazard statements | H226, H351, H412 |
| Precautionary statements | P201, P202, P210, P233, P240, P241, P242, P243, P273, P280, P281, P303+P361+P353, P308+P313, P370+P378, P403+P235, P405, P501 |
- Lethal dose or concentration (LD, LC)
| LD_{50} (median dose) | 500 mg/kg (mice). |

Related compounds
| Related compounds | Benzothiophene, Indole, Indene, 2-Cumaranone |
- Except where otherwise noted, data are given for materials in their standard state (at 25 °C [77 °F], 100 kPa). verify (what is ?) Infobox references

Benzofuran is the heterocyclic compound consisting of fused benzene and furan rings. This colourless liquid is a component of coal tar. Benzofuran is the structural nucleus (parent compound) of many related compounds with more complex structures. For example, psoralen is a benzofuran derivative that occurs in several plants.

There are benzofuran based herbicides: ethofumesate and benfuresate. Several psychoactive drugs such as 5-MAPB and 6-APB are also derived from benzofuran.

== Production ==
Benzofuran is extracted from coal tar. It is also obtained by dehydrogenation of 2-ethylphenol.

=== Laboratory methods ===
Benzofurans can be prepared by various methods in the laboratory. Notable examples include:

- O-alkylation of salicylaldehyde with chloroacetic acid followed by dehydration (cyclication) of the resulting ether and decarboxylation.

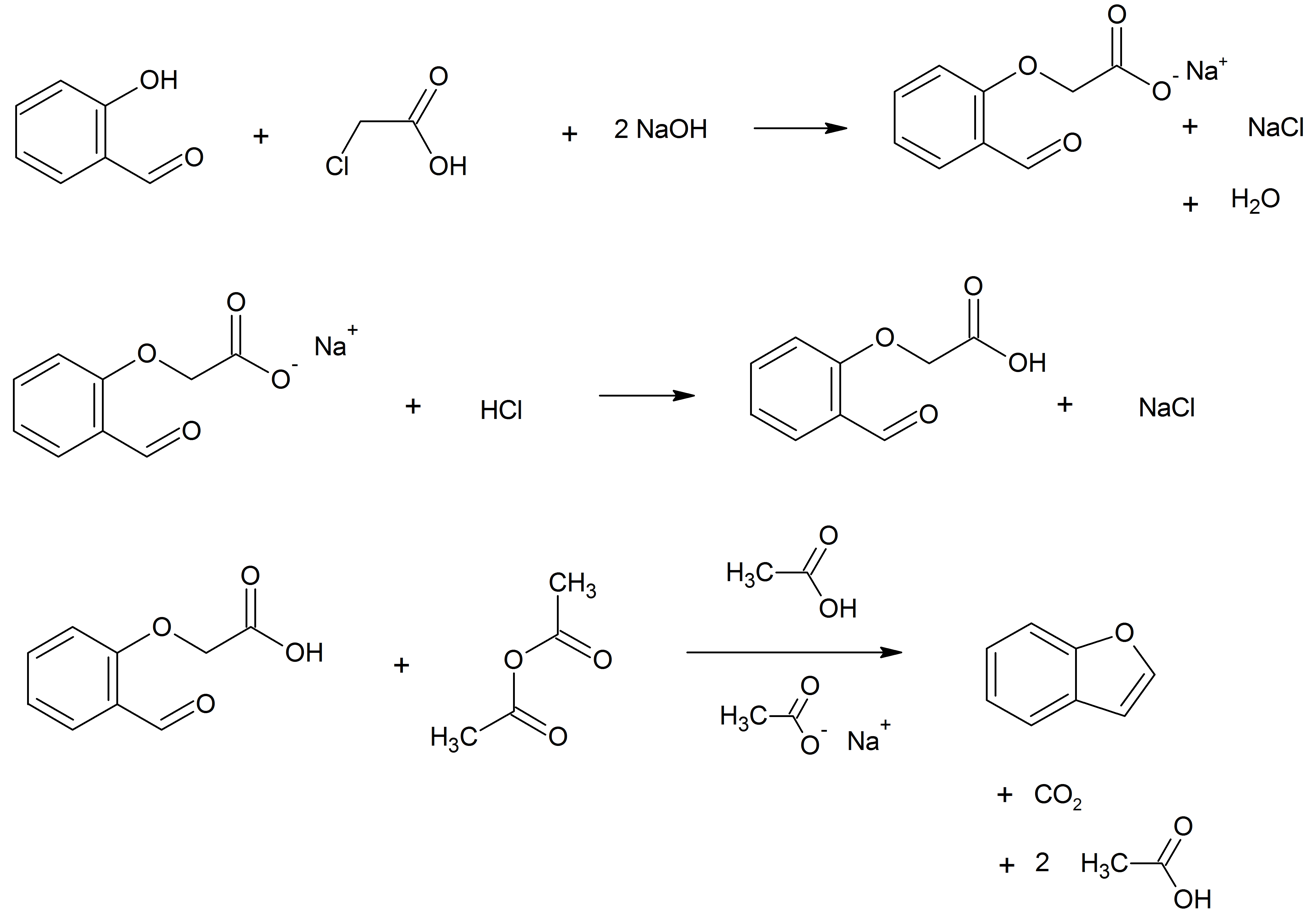

- Perkin rearrangement, where a coumarin is reacted with a hydroxide:

- Diels–Alder reaction of nitro vinyl furans with various dienophiles, followed by thermal nitrite elimination and aromatizing dehydrogenation:

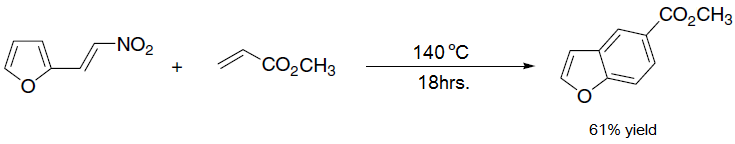

- Cycloisomerization of alkyne ortho-substituted phenols:

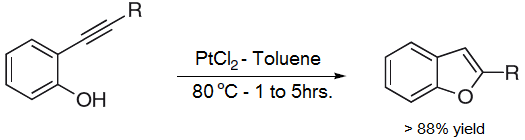

== Related compounds ==
- Substituted benzofurans
- Dibenzofuran, an analog with a second fused benzene ring.
- Furan, an analog without the fused benzene ring.
- Indole, an analog with a nitrogen instead of the oxygen atom.
- Benzothiophene, an analog with a sulfur instead of the oxygen atom.
- Isobenzofuran, the isomer with oxygen in the adjacent position.
- Aurone
- Thunberginol F
