= 1,3-Diphenylisobenzofuran =

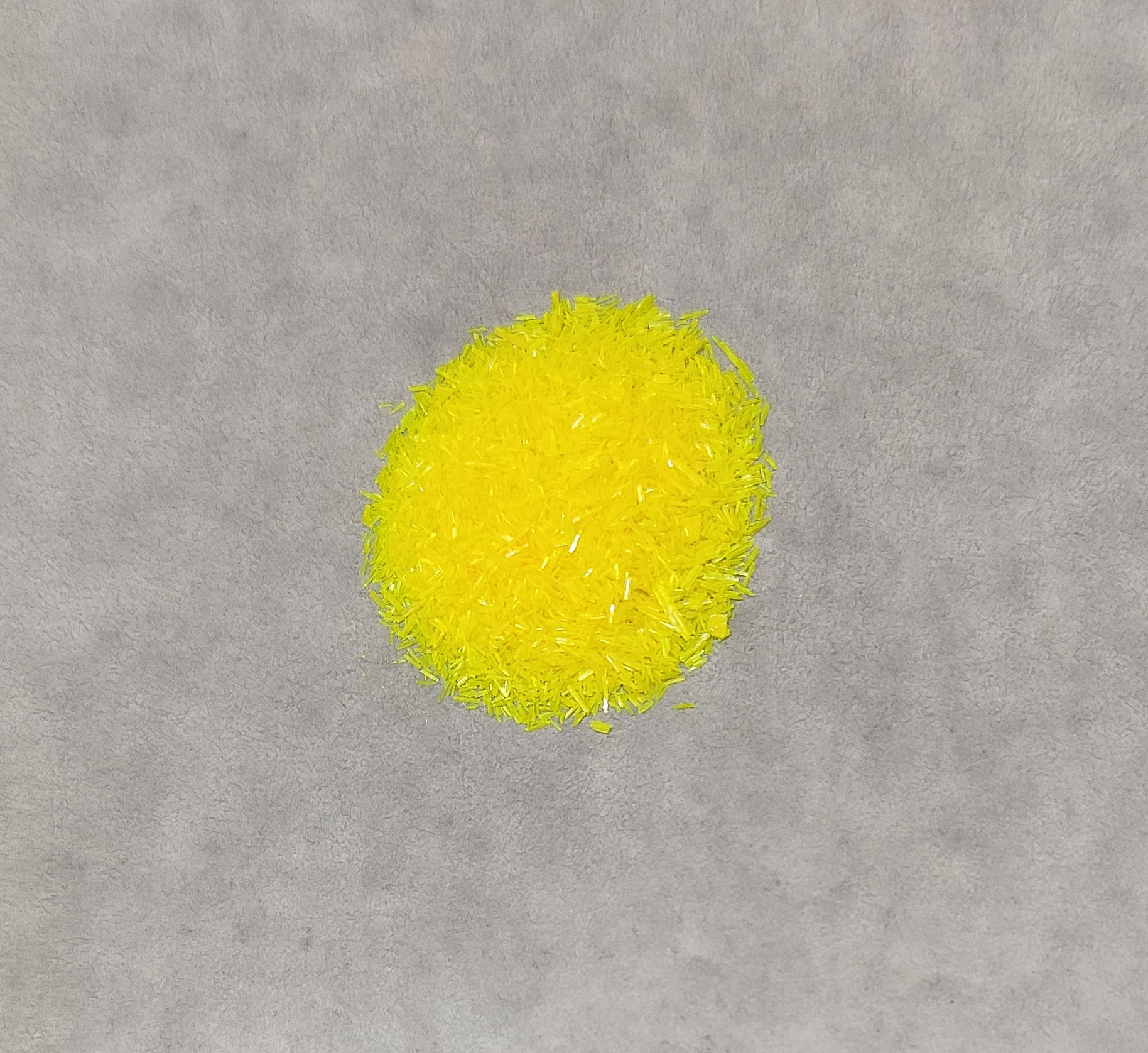

Names
- Preferred IUPAC name 1,3-Diphenyl-2-benzofuran

Identifiers
CAS Number	5471-63-6
3D model (JSmol)	Interactive image
ChemSpider	20348
ECHA InfoCard	100.024.371
EC Number	226-808-5
PubChem CID	21649
UNII	OQ2CY31MDT
CompTox Dashboard (EPA)	DTXSID40203179
- InChI: InChI=1S/C20H14O/c1-3-9-15(10-4-1)19-17-13-7-8-14-18(17)20(21-19)16-11-5-2-6-12-16/h1-14H Key: ZKSVYBRJSMBDMV-UHFFFAOYSA-N
- SMILES: C1=CC=C(C=C1)C2=C3C=CC=CC3=C(O2)C4=CC=CC=C4

Properties
Chemical formula	C_{20}H_{14}O
Molar mass	270.331 g·mol^{−1}
Appearance	pale yellow to dark yellow crystalline powder
Density	1.0717 g·cm^{−3} bei 25 °C
Melting point	* 125–126 °C: 128–130 °C
Solubility in water	almost insoluble
Solubility in acetonitrile, benzene, dichloromethane, chloroform, dimethylsulfoxide, tetrahydrofuran or toluene	soluble
- Except where otherwise noted, data are given for materials in their standard state (at 25 °C [77 °F], 100 kPa). Infobox references

1,3-Diphenylisobenzofuran is a highly reactive diene that can scavenge unstable and short-lived dienophiles in a Diels-Alder reaction. It is furthermore used as a standard reagent for the determination of singlet oxygen, even in biological systems. Cycloadditions with 1,3-diphenylisobenzofuran and subsequent oxygen cleavage provide access to a variety of polyaromatics.

== Preparation ==
The first synthesis of 1,3-diphenylisobenzofuran was reported in 1905 by A. Guyot and J. Catel. Phenylmagnesium bromide was reacted with 3-phenylphthalide (the latter accessible from the methyl ester of 3-hydroxyphthalide with phenylboronic acid in 95% yield) to a lactol, which dehydrates to 1,3-diphenylisobenzofuran with 87% yield. A mineral acid catalyzes the dehydration reaction.

Synthese von 1,3-Diphenylisobenzofuran aus 3-Phenylphthalid

The patent literature describes the preparation of 1,3-diphenylisobenzofuran by [4+2]cycloaddition of 1,3-butadiene and dibenzoylethylene (1,4-diphenyl-2-butene-1,4-dione, accessible from fumaryl chloride and benzene in the presence of aluminium chloride.). Dibenzoylethylene is predominantly present in the trans configuration but it can be converted into the needed cis configuration by simple heating.

Synthese von 1,3-Diphenylisobenzofuran aus Butadien und Dibenzoylethylen

The 4,5-dibenzoylcyclohexene formed previously is cyclized with acetic anhydride to the dihydroisobenzofuran. By bromine addition and hydrogen bromide elimination, 1,2-dibenzoylbenzene is formed and recyclized with zinc acetic acid to the final product 1,3-diphenylisobenzofuran. A publication from 1940 describes high yields for the individual stages of the extensive reaction sequence.

The (much cheaper) phthaloyl chloride gives also access to 1,2-dibenzoylbenzene via Friedel-Crafts acylation with benzene, which is reduced to 1,3-diphenylisobenzofuran in 78% yield using potassium borohydride.

Synthese von 1,3-Diphenylisobenzofuran aus 1,2-Dibenzoylbenzol

The synthesis of 1,3-diarylisobenzofurans from 2-acylbenzaldehydes and boronic acids is less cumbersome and gives better yields,

Synthese von 1,3-Diphenylisobenzofuran aus 2-Formylbenzophenon

just like the synthesis from salicylaldehydes via phenacylhydrazones, which undergo oxidation with lead(IV) acetate to give ortho-diketones, followed by the reaction with an aryl Grignard reagent.

Synthese von 1,3-Diphenylisobenzofuran aus Salicylaldehyd

== Properties ==
1,3-Diphenylisobenzofuran is a yellow, light- and air-sensitive, crystalline solid that is soluble in many organic solvents with a maximum absorption around 420 nm (in solution), which generates intense fluorescence. Fluorescence measurements can be performed in DMF and DMSO because of the stability of 1,3-DPBF in those solvents. In chloroform and carbon tetrachloride the dissolved 1,3-diphenylisobenzofuran is rapidly photolyzed by attack of CHCl_{2} and CCl_{3} radicals, even in the absence of oxygen. [24 ]

With ethanol, 1,3-diphenylisobenzofuran forms an orange-yellow, fluorescent solution. On irradiation, it forms a colorless photodimer (upon with exclusion of oxygen), upon discolouration of the solution.

Photodimerisierung von 1,3-Diphenylisobenzofuran

The compound's refractive index is 1,6700 at 25 °C and 589 nm.

== Use ==
=== Reagent for determination of singlet oxygen ===
1,3-Diphenylisobenzofuran Reaktion mit Singulett-Sauerstoff

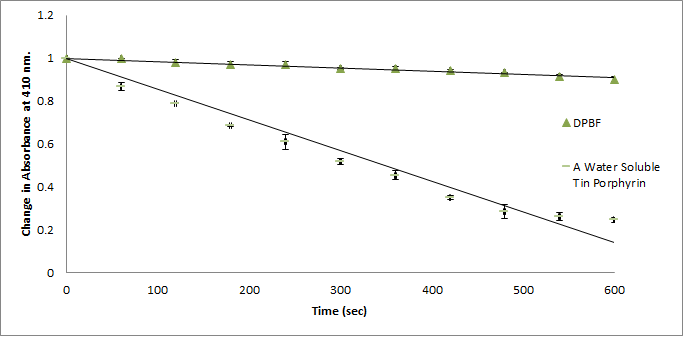
Graph showing change in absorbance of DPBF vs. irradiation time in the presence of photosensitizer (porphyrin)

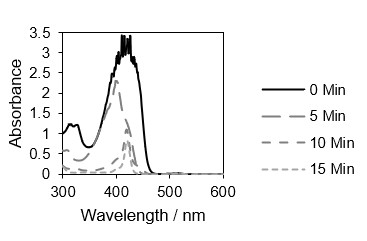
Electron absorption spectrum showing photodegradation of DPBF in the presence of a porphyrin photosensitzier, during intermittent periods of irradiation with ~630 nm light

In the presence of methylene blue irradiated with red laser light, 1,3-diphenylisobenzofuran reacts with intermediate singlet oxygen ^{1}O_{2}, forming an unstable peroxide that decomposes into (colorless) 1,2-dibenzoylbenzene. The detection of singlet oxygen by 1,3-diphenylisobenzofuran is based on this reaction, even in biological systems. For biological systems, water-soluble derivatives of 1,3-diphenylisobenzofuran were developed. The singlet oxygen generation of photosensitizers were monitored by photolysis of 1,3-diphenylisobenzofuran (DPBF). 1,2-Dibenzoylbenzene absorbs at <300 nm, therefore making DPBF an optimal chemical trap for detecting singlet oxygen, as most photosensitizers absorb <400-600 nm. This allows for an accurate determination of the photodegradation of the molecule.

=== Dienophile in Diels-Alder reactions ===
Isobenzofurans like 1,3-diphenylisobenzofuran are among the most reactive Diels-Alder dienes known to date, and are useful for scavenging short-lived and unstable olefins and alkynes. The group led by Georg Wittig made important contributions to this topic.

With the unstable cyclohexyne, 1,3-diphenylisobenzofuran reacts to a tricyclic compound that gives a 9,10-diphenylcyclohexenonaphthalene after hydrogenation and hydrogen abstraction.

Reaktion von 1,3-Diphenylisobenzofuran mit Cyclohexin

1,3-Diphenylisobenzofuran gives similarly with benzyne (dehydrobenzene) an oxygen-bridged anthracene (in 85% yield), which can be reduced with zinc to 9,10-diphenylanthracene (88% yield).

Reaktion von 1,3-Diphenylisobenzofuran mit Dehydrobenzol

Cyclopropenone (which is unstable above its melting point of −29 °C) reacts quantitatively at room temperature with 1,3-diphenylisobenzofuran to form a Diels-Alder adduct, which is exclusively an exo isomer.

Reaktion von 1,3-Diphenylisobenzofuran mit Cyclopropenon

Dimethyl acetylenedicarboxylate reacts with 1,3-diphenylisobenzofuran as dienophile in 84% yield to yield the corresponding adduct.

Reaktion von 1,3-Diphenylisobenzofuran mit Acetylendicarbonsäureester

1,3-Diphenylisobenzofuran reacts also with heterocyclic dienophiles such as 3-sulfolene to the corresponding Diels-Alder adduct.

=== Molecular building block for polyaromatics ===
Polyaromatic hydrocarbons (PAHs) are of interest as precursors to graphite but also raise concern as ingredients of pollution. They have persistence and carcinogenicity. 1,3-diphenylisobenzofuran reacts quantitatively with acenaphthylene when heated to 160 °C to give 7,12-diphenylbenzo[k]fluoranthene.

Reaktion von 1,3-Diphenylisobenzofuran mit Acenaphthylen

The twice occurring Diels-Alder reaction of 1,3-diphenylisobenzofuran with p-benzoquinone yields almost quantitatively a product that can be reacted further with p-toluenesulfonic acid to give a pentacene derivative in 49% yield.

Reaktion von 1,3-Diphenylisobenzofuran zum Pentacen

== Literature ==
- W. Friedrichsen (1980), "Benzo[c]furans", Advances in Heterocyclic Chemistry, vol. 26, pp. 135–234, doi:10.1016/S0065-2725(08)60141-5, ISBN 9780120206261
- W. Friedrichsen (1999), "Recent Advances in the Chemistry of Benzo[c]furans and Related Compounds", Advances in Heterocyclic Chemistry, vol. 73, pp. 1–96, doi:10.1016/S0065-2725(08)60940-X, ISBN 9780120207732
- R. Rodrigo (1988), "Progress in the chemistry of isobenzofurans", Tetrahedron, 44 (8): 2093–2135, doi:10.1016/S0040-4020(01)81720-8
