= 2-Coumaranone =

Names
- Preferred IUPAC name 1-Benzofuran-2(3H)-one

Identifiers
CAS Number	553-86-6
3D model (JSmol)	Interactive image
ChEMBL	ChEMBL284584
ChemSpider	61668
ECHA InfoCard	100.008.230
EC Number	209-052-0
PubChem CID	68382
UNII	4K47Z4Q1E7
CompTox Dashboard (EPA)	DTXSID70203829
- InChI: InChI=1S/C8H6O2/c9-8-5-6-3-1-2-4-7(6)10-8/h1-4H,5H2 Key: ACZGCWSMSTYWDQ-UHFFFAOYSA-N
- SMILES: C1C2=CC=CC=C2OC1=O

Properties
Chemical formula	C_{8}H_{6}O_{2}
Melting point	49–51 °C

Hazards
- GHS labelling
Pictograms	(GHS07: Exclamation mark)
Signal word	Warning
Hazard statements	H315, H317, H319
Precautionary statements	P261, P264, P264+P265, P272, P280, P302+P352, P305+P351+P338, P321, P333+P317, P337+P317, P362+P364, P501
- Except where otherwise noted, data are given for materials in their standard state (at 25 °C [77 °F], 100 kPa). Infobox references

2-Coumaranone (sometimes also called 2-Cumaranone) is a bicyclic heteroaromatic compound in which a six-membered benzene ring is annulated with a five-membered γ-butyrolactone ring. The 2(3H)-benzofuranone can also be considered as a lactone of (2-hydroxyphenyl)acetic acid. The benzofuranone basic structure is the basis of some natural products – such as rosmadial, which is isolatable from rosemary oil, and some substances with high pharmacological activity, such as griseofulvin and rifampicin. Furthermore, 2-cumaranone is utilized as a starting material for the preparation of chemiluminescent and fluorescent dyes, for synthetic pharmaceutical agents, like the antiarrhythmic drug dronedarone, and especially for the fungicide azoxystrobin.

== Occurrence and synthesis ==
In 1884, Adolf von Baeyer and Paul Fritsch disclosed the synthesis of 2-coumaranone, which they described as the lactone of o-oxyphenylacetic acid, through the distillation "over free fire" of (2-hydroxyphenyl)acetic acid.

Synthesis of 2-coumaranone from 2-hydroxyphenylacetic acid

The lactone 3H-benzofuran-2-one forms in this process under intramolecular water splitting at high temperature and in an impure state.

A similar fragmentation by oxidative intramolecular ring closure from phenylacetic acid also yields only modest returns (< 20%) due to the oxidation sensitivity of the methylene group and the formation of several by-products 2-coumaranone.

synthesis of 2-coumaranone from phenylacetic acid

The Ozonolysis of 2-allylphenol obtained by the alkylation of phenol with 3-bromopropene to produce phenylallyl ether and subsequently its Claisen rearrangement, gives rise to 2-hydroxyphenylacetic acid, which, through water splitting, yields 2-coumaranone. Despite this method having good yields, its economic and safety considerations make it unsuitable for an industrial process.

2-Coumaranone from 2-allylphenol via ozonolysis

On an industrial scale, the well-filtered starting materials cyclohexanone and glyoxylic acid are first transformed in an acid-catalyzed aldol condensation to form the (predominantly) cis-2-oxocyclohexylidene acetic acid (A). This then, in a second step, is transformed into the so-called enollactone (B) through water elimination (90% yield). The enollactone is continuously dehydrogenated at 250 °C in the vapor phase on a palladium catalyst to form 2-coumaranone (C) dehydrogenation (yield approximately 67%).

Industrial synthesis of 2-coumaranone from cyclohexanone and glyoxylic acid

An alternative process that uses glyoxylic acid methyl ester methylhemiacetals rather than glyoxylic acid as a starting material has not gained widespread acceptance.

== Properties ==
Pure 2-coumaranone manifests as an off-white to pale yellow solid with an aromatic odor. On purification by distillation, "a colorless oil passes which solidifies in the receiver into splendid, transparent, well-formed crystals". 3H-benzofuran-2-one is soluble in hot water, diethyl ether and acetonitrile. The lactone hydrolyzes slowly in hot water and rapidly in aqueous alkalis to form 2-hydroxyphenylacetic acid or its alkali salt.

== Applications ==
5-Nitro-3H-benzofuran-2-one is formed during the nitration of 2-coumaranone with nitrating acid.

5-Nitro- and 5-amino-2-coumaranone

The 5-amino-3H-benzofuran-2-one can be obtained from the nitro compound using catalytic hydrogenation at a palladium catalyst.

Lactones such as 2-coumaranone ('I) are readily cleaved by nucleophiles, leading to ring opening. Thus, 5-nitro-3H-benzofuran-2-one reacts with secondary amines to form 2-hydroxyphenylacetic acid amides. Through hydrogenation, these transform into corresponding 3-amino-6-hydroxyphenylethylamines, which are useful precursors for hair dyeing.

Hair dye precursors starting from 2-coumaranone

Condensation of 5-nitro-3H-benzofuran-2-one (II) with a mixture of valeric acid (III) and valeric anhydride (IV) results in the enollactone (V), which upon heating rearranges to the substituted benzofurancarboxylic acid (VI), a key precursor for the antiarrhythmic drug Dronedarone.

Dronedarone precursor starting from 2-coumaranone

The basic structure of 2-coumaranone also underlies a class of antioxidants and radical scavengers, especially for stabilizing polypropylenes. In the synthesis of a model compound, glyoxylic acid reacts with 2 moles of 4-tert-butylphenol in the presence of methanesulfonic acid CH_{3}SO_{3}H to form a phenolic intermediate and is then esterified with benzoic acid.

Antioxidants with 2-coumaranone structure

A one-pot reaction, carried out as a Tscherniak-Einhorn reaction of fluorophenols (X), glyoxylic acid (Y), and carbamates, such as carbamic acid methyl ester or carbamic acid mesityl ester (Z), yields 2-coumaranones with carbamide side chains. These compounds react with strong bases such as diazabicycloundecene or potassium tert-butanolate, and show pronounced chemiluminescence in the presence of oxygen.

chemiluminescence molecules with 2-coumaranone structure

The most notable application of 2-coumaranone by volume is as a starting material for the synthesis of the fungicide azoxystrobin (known as Amistar from Syngenta) in the class of strobilurins.
