= Tscherniak-Einhorn reaction =

Chemical reaction

The Tscherniak-Einhorn reaction is an organic chemistry name reaction initiated in 1901 by Joseph Tscherniak. It involves the condensation of N- hydroxymethylphthalimide with varied aromatic compounds. This process was later expanded upon in 1905 by Alfred Einhorn to include the condensation of N- hydroxymethylchloroacetamide and benzoic or cinnamic acid.

== Overview of reaction ==
This reaction entails an acid-catalyzed Electrophilic aromatic substitution amidoalkylation, utilizing an N-hydroxymethylamide or N-hydroxymethylimide, which are also known as the Tscherniak-Einhorn reagents. The reaction is catalyzed by potent acids such as 85-100% sulfuric acid, p-toluenesulfonic acid, methanesulfonic acid, or trifluoroacetic acid.

N-hydroxymethylamides may be prepared by the condensation of corresponding amides with an aqueous formaldehyde solution in dioxane, in the presence of sodium hydroxide.

== Reaction mechanism ==
In the first step, the N-hydroxymethylamide is subject to acid protonation. Post water elimination, a mesomerically stabilized cation forms. This reacts with the aromatic compound in line with an electrophilic aromatic substitution process.

== Applications ==
The Tscherniak-Einhorn reaction is used to synthesize some alkaloid derivatives.

== Literature ==
- Harold E. Zaugg, Ann M. Kotre, Jean E. Fraser (January 1969), "Tscherniac-Einhorn reaction. I. Equilibria in solutions of N-(hydroxymethyl)phthalimide in strong sulfuric acid", The Journal of Organic Chemistry, vol. 34, no. 1, pp. 11–13, doi:10.1021/jo00838a004
- Harold E. Zaugg, Robert W. DeNet, Jean E. Fraser, Ann M. Kotre (January 1969), "Tscherniac-Einhorn reaction. II. Kinetics and mechanism", The Journal of Organic Chemistry, vol. 34, no. 1, pp. 14–18, doi:10.1021/jo00838a005
