= Uranium poisoning in Punjab =

2009 disaster in Punjab, India

Coordinates: 30°40′N 74°45′E

Uranium poisoning in Punjab made news in 2009 when South African metal toxicologist Carin Smit ordered tests to be performed on children at Baba Farid Center For Special Children (BFCSC), a centre for children with autism, cerebral palsy, and other neurological disorders in Faridkot, Punjab. Lab tests found high levels of uranium in local children. Environmental tests found that Punjab's groundwater, especially that near ash ponds, had high levels of uranium.

== History ==
In 1995, Guru Nanak Dev University (GNDU) released a report showing the presence of uranium and other heavy metals beyond permissible limits in water samples collected from Bathinda and Amritsar districts. There was no response from the government at that time. The hotspot for this increased toxicity was the Malwa region of Punjab, which showed extremely high levels of chemical, biological and radioactive toxicity, including uranium contamination.

As the region's groundwater and food chain was gradually contaminated by industrial effluents flowing into fresh water sources used both for irrigation and drinking purposes, the region showed a rise in neurological diseases, and a sharp increase in cancer cases and kidney ailments. In Muktsar district between 2001 and 2009, 1,074 people died of cancer.

In March 2008, South African clinical metal toxicologist Carin Smit visited the Baba Farid Center For Special Children (BFCSC), a Faridkot-based not-for-profit organization working with children with autism, cerebral palsy, and other neurological disorders. Smit requested laboratory tests from MicroTrace Minerals, a laboratory in Germany. In April 2009, Smit reported that MicroTrace Minerals found high levels of uranium in hair samples of BFCSC children. After news broke of these tests, The Telegraph reported that healthcare workers had "suspected that children were being slowly poisoned" for years, and that workers in Faridkot and Bathinda began to voice concerns when they saw an increase in admissions of severely disabled children with birth defects like hydrocephaly, microcephaly, cerebral palsy, Down's syndrome, and other physical and mental abnormalities. Smit and BFCSC continued testing children at the centre. In 2010, Smit reported that MicroTrace Minerals found high uranium levels in 87% of BFCSC children younger than 12 years and 82% of older BFCSC children.

Subsequent ground water tests displayed levels of uranium as high as 224 micrograms per litre (μg/L). Samples taken in the vicinity of the coal-fired power plants were up to 15 times the World Health Organization's maximum safe limits, and that contamination extended across the state of Punjab. In 2010, water samples taken from Buddha Nullah, a highly polluted water canal which merges into the Sutlej River, showed high heavy metal content and the presence of uranium 1.5 times the reference range.

== Response ==
In April 2009, the government of Punjab ordered a probe into the matter, and a series of tests with the Bhabha Atomic Research Centre were conducted. Discussing the tests, civil surgeon Vivek Jain said, "there is no side effect of uranium [...] and the levels are very much below the levels. So that can't cause any mental retardation or any abnormality." The government attributed abnormalities to genetic disorders. Local media blamed the government for not monitoring the environmental impact of ash ponds and the lack of proper study of the prevalent uranium contamination in the region.

MicroTrace Minerals continued testing cancer patients living in the Malwa region of Punjab, the area known for having the highest cancer rate in India.

== Possible causes ==
A 2009 The Observer investigation found that the possible cause of soil and groundwater contamination in Malwa was fly ash from coal burnt at thermal power plants, which contains high levels of uranium and ash as the region has state's two biggest coal-fired power stations. In Bathinda district, tests on ground water found the highest average concentration of uranium (56.95 μg/L) in Bhucho Mandi, close to the ash pond of the Lehra Mohabat thermal power plant. Tests also found high uranium levels in Jai Singh Wala village, close to the Bathinda ash pond.

In 2010, The Times of India reported that high concentrations of uranium could be attributed to the United States' use of depleted uranium in the War in Afghanistan.

Researchers have concluded that geological causes are the main source of the uranium contamination in Punjab, as uranium enrichments occur in the underlying Siwalik sediments.
