= Benzo(j)fluoranthene =

Chemical compound

Benzo[j]fluoranthene
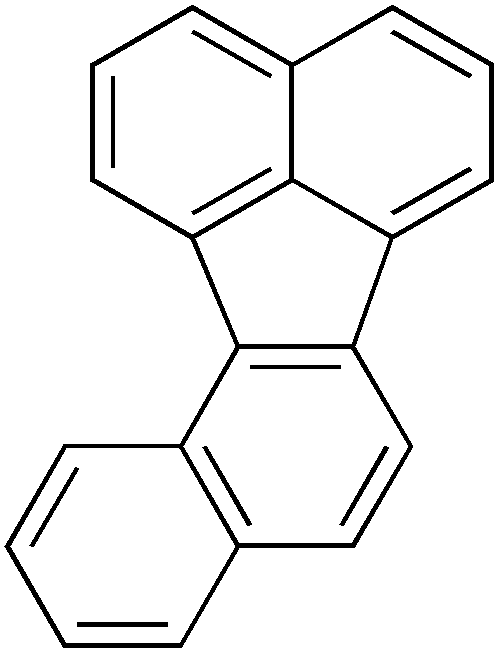

Names
- Preferred IUPAC name Benzo[j]fluoranthene

Identifiers
CAS Number	205-82-3
3D model (JSmol)	Interactive image
ChemSpider	8798
ECHA InfoCard	100.005.374
EC Number	205-910-3
KEGG	C19196
PubChem CID	9152
RTECS number	DF6300000
UNII	P63HLW88W8
UN number	3077
CompTox Dashboard (EPA)	DTXSID8052691
- InChI: InChI=1S/C20H12/c1-2-8-15-13(5-1)11-12-17-16-9-3-6-14-7-4-10-18(19(14)16)20(15)17/h1-12H Key: KHNYNFUTFKJLDD-UHFFFAOYSA-N; InChI=1/C20H12/c1-2-8-15-13(5-1)11-12-17-16-9-3-6-14-7-4-10-18(19(14)16)20(15)17/h1-12H Key: KHNYNFUTFKJLDD-UHFFFAOYAB
- SMILES: c5c3c1cccc2c1c(ccc2)c3c4ccccc4c5

Properties
Chemical formula	C_{20}H_{12}
Molar mass	252.3093
Appearance	solid
Density	1.286 g/cm_{3}
Melting point	165 °C (329 °F; 438 K)

Hazards
Flash point	228.6 °C (443.5 °F; 501.8 K)
- Except where otherwise noted, data are given for materials in their standard state (at 25 °C [77 °F], 100 kPa). verify (what is ?) Infobox references

Benzo[j]fluoranthene (BjF) is an organic compound with the chemical formula C_{20}H_{12}. Classified as a polycyclic aromatic hydrocarbon (PAH), it is a colourless solid that is poorly soluble in most solvents. Impure samples can appear off white. Closely related isomeric compounds include benzo[a]fluoranthene (BaF), benzo[b]fluoranthene (BbF), benzo[e]fluoranthene (BeF), and benzo[k]fluoranthene (BkF). BjF is present in fossil fuels and is released during incomplete combustion of organic matter. It has been traced in the smoke of cigarettes, exhaust from gasoline engines, emissions from the combustion of various types of coal and emissions from oil heating, as well as an impurity in some oils such as soybean oil.

== Structure and synthesis ==
BjF consists of two naphthalene-like structures which are fused by a cyclopentane structure. This cyclopentane is not included in the aromaticity of the molecule. BjF can be obtained when either 2-(1-chloroethenyl)benzo[c]phenanthrene or 6-(1-chloroethenyl)chrysene is treated by flash vacuum thermolysis (FVT) at high temperatures (above 900 °C) followed by ring rearrangements (ring contraction/expansion) to selectively yield BjF. Benzo[k]fluoranthene may also be converted via similar processes to BjF by FVT at temperatures of at least 1100 °C (6% yield) or at least 1200 °C (11% yield) with 38% mass recovery.

== Reactivity ==
BjF can be functionalized by means of electrophilic aromatic substitution. In the body it is metabolized into phenols (3,4,6 or 10 hydroxy), dihydrodiols (4,5 and 9,10) and 4,5-dione (fig. 1).

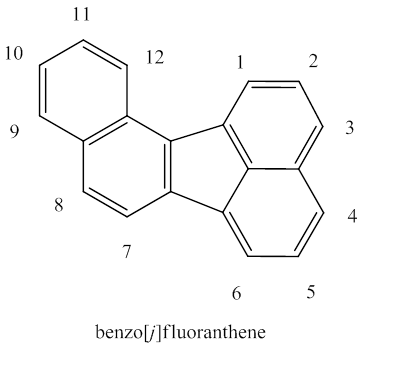
Figure 1. BjF with numbered carbon atoms

== Mechanism of action ==
BjF is categorized by the IARC as possibly carcinogenic to human beings, like many other PAHs, on the basis of sufficient evidence in animals. For example, BjF is active as a tumor initiator on mouse skin and is carcinogenic in both mouse skin and in rat lungs. Recently, BjF was also found to induce tumors in newborn mouse lung and liver. The mechanism of actions of BjF is similar to other PAHs. The diolepoxide mechanism involves formation of stable and unstable DNA adducts, mainly at G and A, which can lead to mutations in proto-oncogenes (RAS) and tumour-suppressor genes (P53). Many polycyclic aromatic hydrocarbon diolepoxides and their precursor diols and epoxides are tumorigenic in animals. The radical cation mechanism involves generation of unstable adducts at G and A, leading to apurinic sites and mutations in HRAS. Orthoquinone formation could lead to stable and unstable DNA adducts and generation of reactive oxygen species, inducing mutations in P53.

== Toxicity ==
=== PAHs ===
One of the earliest connection between PAHs, combustion, and cancer was established by Cook and co-workers with the isolation of the carcinogen benzo[a]pyrene from coal tar extract. Benzo[a]pyrene now has been well characterized in toxicology reports and is a known potent carcinogen. Benzo[a]pyrene requires metabolic activation to become, ultimately, BPDE ((±)-anti-7β,8α-dihydroxy-9α,10α-epoxy-7,8,9,10-tetrahydrobenzo[a]pyrene) which binds to the DNA to form a covalent trans adducts at the N2 position of guanine. Hereafter binding to DNA at cancer hotspots, especially in the P53 tumour suppressor gene at codons: 157, 248 and 273 (figure 3), it has the possibility of inducing lung cancer. Structural similarity of PAHs contributes to the similarity in metabolism, biotransformation and toxicology. Benzo[a]pyrene has been extensively reviewed and is used as a model for the toxicology and metabolism of other PAHs.

=== Benzo[j]fluoranthene ===
Specific studies on BjF showed that it exhibits mutagenic toxicity in S. typhimurium TA98 and TA1000 under the presence of microsomal activation. BjF can form DNA-adducts, covalently binding of chemicals to DNA can result in strand breaks and DNA damage, which ultimately leads to mutations. In mice studies BjF induced tumorigenic activity on the skin, lung adenomas and liver adenomas/hepatomas. Lung implantation of BjF also induced lung epidermoid carcinomas in 3-month-old female rats. Tail vein injection of BjF also causes covalently binding to mouse hemoglobin and serum proteins, with binding to serum proteins being 10-fold higher than to hemoglobin.
