= Benzo(k)fluoranthene =

Chemical compound

Benzo[k]fluoranthene
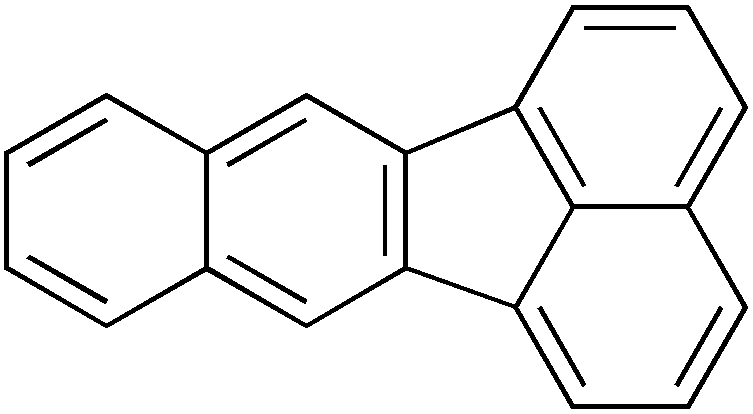

Names
- Preferred IUPAC name Benzo[k]fluoranthene

Identifiers
CAS Number	207-08-9
3D model (JSmol)	Interactive image
ChemSpider	8804
ECHA InfoCard	100.005.379
EC Number	205-916-6
KEGG	C14321
PubChem CID	9158
RTECS number	DF6350000
UNII	U0P6LY48VF
UN number	2811, 3082
CompTox Dashboard (EPA)	DTXSID0023909
- InChI: InChI=1S/C20H12/c1-2-6-15-12-19-17-10-4-8-13-7-3-9-16(20(13)17)18(19)11-14(15)5-1/h1-12H Key: HAXBIWFMXWRORI-UHFFFAOYSA-N; InChI=1/C20H12/c1-2-6-15-12-19-17-10-4-8-13-7-3-9-16(20(13)17)18(19)11-14(15)5-1/h1-12H Key: HAXBIWFMXWRORI-UHFFFAOYAA
- SMILES: c1ccc2cc-3c(cc2c1)-c4cccc5c4c3ccc5

Properties
Chemical formula	C_{20}H_{12}
Molar mass	252.316 g·mol^{−1}
Appearance	Yellow crystals
Density	1.286 g/cm^{3}
Melting point	217 °C (423 °F; 490 K)

Hazards
Flash point	228.6 °C (443.5 °F; 501.8 K)
- Except where otherwise noted, data are given for materials in their standard state (at 25 °C [77 °F], 100 kPa). verify (what is ?) Infobox references

Benzo[k]fluoranthene is an organic compound with the chemical formula C_{20}H_{12}. Classified as a polycyclic aromatic hydrocarbon (PAH), it forms pale yellow needles or crystals, and is poorly soluble in most solvents. Impure samples can appear off white. Closely related isomeric compounds include benzo(a)fluoranthene, benzo(b)fluoranthene, benzo(e)fluoranthene, and benzo(j)fluoranthene.
