= Benzo(a)fluoranthene =

Chemical compound

Benzo[a]fluoranthene

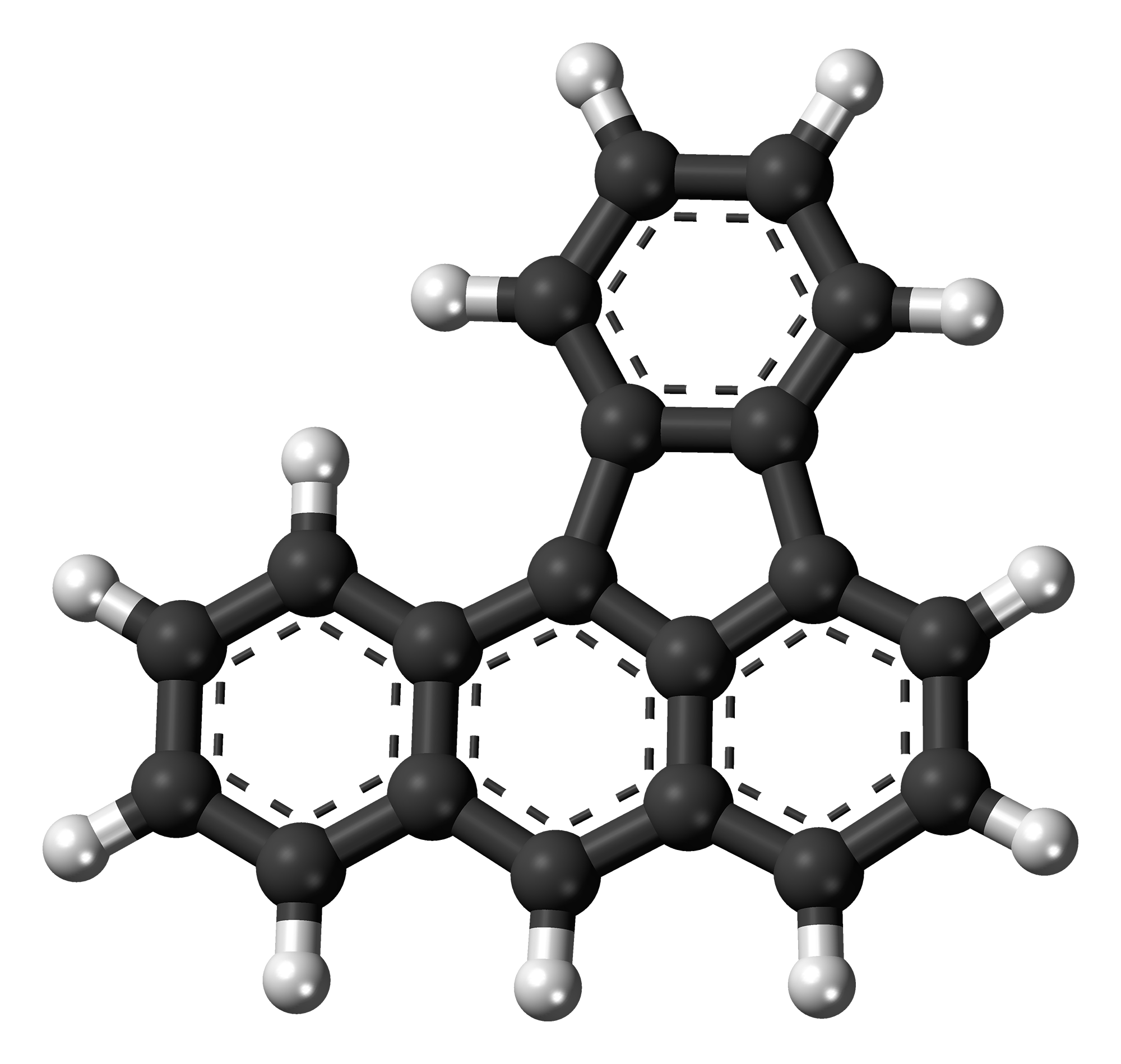

Names
- Preferred IUPAC name Benzo[a]aceanthrylene
- Other names Benzo[a]fluoranthene

Identifiers
CAS Number	203-33-8
3D model (JSmol)	Interactive image
ChEBI	CHEBI:82400
ChemSpider	8792
KEGG	C19341
PubChem CID	9146
UNII	D03I23M795
CompTox Dashboard (EPA)	DTXSID4059756
- InChI: InChI=1S/C20H12/c1-2-8-15-13(6-1)12-14-7-5-11-17-16-9-3-4-10-18(16)20(15)19(14)17/h1-12H Key: OQDXASJSCOTNQS-UHFFFAOYSA-N
- SMILES: c4cccc5cc1c3c(ccc1)c2ccccc2c3c45

Properties
Chemical formula	C_{20}H_{12}
Molar mass	252.3093
Appearance	Orange-yellow needles
Melting point	144 to 145 °C (291 to 293 °F; 417 to 418 K)
- Except where otherwise noted, data are given for materials in their standard state (at 25 °C [77 °F], 100 kPa). verify (what is ?) Infobox references

Benzo[a]fluoranthene is an organic compound with the chemical formula C_{20}H_{12}.
