= Benz(e)acephenanthrylene =

Chemical compound

Benz[e]acephenanthrylene
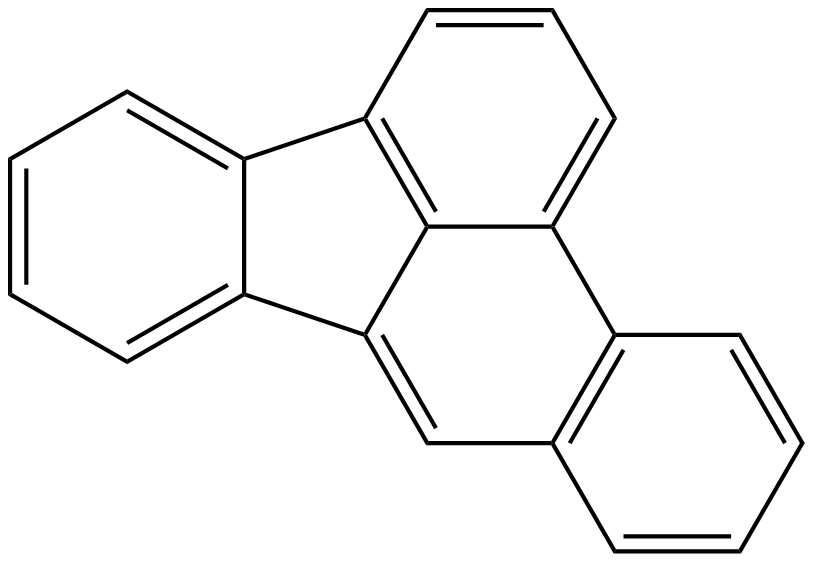

Names
- Preferred IUPAC name Benzo[e]acephenanthrylene
- Other names Benzo[b]fluoranthene; Benzo[e]fluoranthene; 2,3-Benzofluoranthrene; B[b]F; 2,3-Benzofluoranthene; 4,5-Benzofluoranthene; 2,3-Benzfluoranthene; 3,4-Benzfluoranthene; 3,4-Benzofluoranthene; Benz[b]fluoranthene

Identifiers
CAS Number	205-99-2
3D model (JSmol)	: Interactive image
ChEBI	CHEBI:34565
ChEMBL	ChEMBL1797274
ChemSpider	8799
ECHA InfoCard	100.005.375
EC Number	205-911-9
KEGG	C14320
PubChem CID	9153
RTECS number	CU1400000
UNII	FJO154KG1X
UN number	2811, 3077
CompTox Dashboard (EPA)	DTXSID0023907
- InChI: InChI=FTOVXSOBNPWTSH-UHFFFAOYSA-N; : InChI=1S/C20H12/c1-2-7-14-13(6-1)12-19-16-9-4-3-8-15(16)18-11-5-10-17(14)20(18)19/h1-12H
- SMILES: : C1=CC=C2C3=C4C(=CC=C3)C5=CC=CC=C5C4=CC2=C1

Properties
Chemical formula	C_{20}H_{12}
Molar mass	252.316 g·mol^{−1}
Appearance	Off-white to tan powder
Density	1.286 g/cm^{3}
Melting point	166 °C (331 °F; 439 K)
Boiling point	481 °C (898 °F; 754 K)

Hazards
- GHS labelling
Pictograms	(GHS08: Health hazard) (GHS09: Environmental hazard)
Signal word	Danger
Hazard statements	H350, H410
Precautionary statements	P201, P202, P273, P281, P308+P313, P391, P405, P501
- Except where otherwise noted, data are given for materials in their standard state (at 25 °C [77 °F], 100 kPa). Infobox references

Benz[e]acephenanthrylene is an organic compound with the chemical formula C_{20}H_{12}. It is a polycyclic aromatic hydrocarbon (PAH) made of four benzene rings around a 5-membered ring.

== See also ==
- List of interstellar and circumstellar molecules
