= Pigment Violet 29 =

Organic compound used as a pigment and dye

Names
- Preferred IUPAC name Anthra[2,1,9-def:6,5,10-d′e′f′]diisoquinoline-1,3,8,10(2H,9H)-tetrone

Identifiers
CAS Number	81-33-4
3D model (JSmol)	Interactive image
Beilstein Reference	358462
ChEBI	CHEBI:52753
ChemSpider	57523913
ECHA InfoCard	100.001.223
EC Number	201-344-6
PubChem CID	66475
UNII	63NLI8842L
CompTox Dashboard (EPA)	DTXSID9052555
- InChI: InChI=1S/C24H10N2O4/c27-21-13-5-1-9-10-2-6-15-20-16(24(30)26-23(15)29)8-4-12(18(10)20)11-3-7-14(22(28)25-21)19(13)17(9)11/h1-8H,(H,25,27,28)(H,26,29,30) Key: KJOLVZJFMDVPGB-UHFFFAOYSA-N
- SMILES: C1=CC2=C3C(=CC=C4C3=C1C5=C6C4=CC=C7C6=C(C=C5)C(=O)NC7=O)C(=O)NC2=O

Properties
Chemical formula	C_{24}H_{10}N_{2}O_{4}
Molar mass	390.354 g·mol^{−1}
Appearance	Maroon solid
- Except where otherwise noted, data are given for materials in their standard state (at 25 °C [77 °F], 100 kPa). Infobox references

Pigment Violet 29 (C.I. 71129) is an organic compound that is used as a pigment and vat dye. Its colour is dark red purple, or bordeaux.

Structurally, it is a derivative of perylene, although it is produced from acenaphthene. It is a less common dye compared to related derivatives such as pigment red 190 (Vat Red 29).

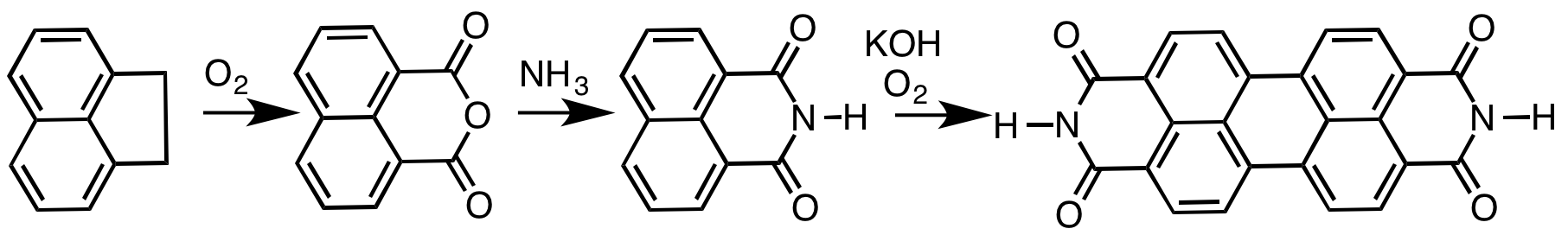
Synthesis of Pigment Violet 29 from acenaphthene

Violet 29 is used in watercolors, acrylic paints, automotive paints, inks for printing and packaging, cleaning and washing agents, pharmaceuticals, solar cells, paper, sporting goods, industrial carpeting, and food packaging.

== Toxicology ==
Violet 29 is derived from perylene, a polycyclic aromatic hydrocarbon. Perylene is less toxic than its well-studied cousin benzo[a]pyrene. Little is known about the compound's mechanism of toxicity, so US EPA findings are based on occupational hazard studies. Violet 29 is highly insoluble in water and octanol, so any exposure routes are considered to be by inhalation of dust. Thus, the EPA determined that occupational exposure was realistically the only way toxic levels could be reached in any group.

== EPA risk review ==
Violet 29 is under risk evaluation review by the EPA as part of the Toxic Substances Control Act (TSCA).

In early 2021, the EPA Final Risk Review found "no unreasonable risk" to the environment, consumers, bystanders, or the general population for any conditions of use for Violet 29. However, the EPA found an "unreasonable risk" to workers from the domestic manufacturing or import of the chemical and nearly all uses and disposal. This finding under the TSCA is for alveolar hyperplasia, inflammatory and morphological changes in the lower respiratory tract for chronic inhalation exposures.

The finding of "unreasonable risk" requires the EPA to work to reduce or manage the risk, including banning the use of a particular chemical.
