= Pigment Red 178 =

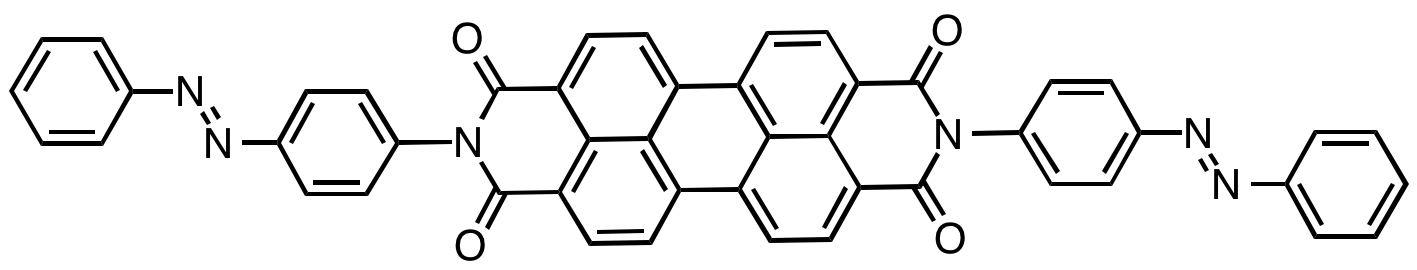

Names
- IUPAC name 7,18-bis(4-phenyldiazenylphenyl)-7,18-diazaheptacyclo[14.6.2.2^{2,5}.0^{3,12}.0^{4,9}.0^{13,23}.0^{20,24}]hexacosa-1(23),2,4,9,11,13,15,20(24),21,25-decaene-6,8,17,19-tetrone

Identifiers
CAS Number	3049-71-6
3D model (JSmol)	Interactive image
ChemSpider	21159767
ECHA InfoCard	100.019.332
EC Number	221-264-5
PubChem CID	62476
UNII	5RL942J1M2
CompTox Dashboard (EPA)	DTXSID1051983
- InChI: InChI=1S/C48H26N6O4/c55-45-37-23-19-33-35-21-25-39-44-40(48(58)54(47(39)57)32-17-13-30(14-18-32)52-50-28-9-5-2-6-10-28)26-22-36(42(35)44)34-20-24-38(43(37)41(33)34)46(56)53(45)31-15-11-29(12-16-31)51-49-27-7-3-1-4-8-27/h1-26H Key: PXUJYZVHENREBB-UHFFFAOYSA-N
- SMILES: C1=CC=C(C=C1)N=NC2=CC=C(C=C2)N3C(=O)C4=C5C(=CC=C6C5=C(C=C4)C7=C8C6=CC=C9C8=C(C=C7)C(=O)N(C9=O)C1=CC=C(C=C1)N=NC1=CC=CC=C1)C3=O

Properties
Chemical formula	C_{48}H_{26}N_{6}O_{4}
Molar mass	750.76
- Except where otherwise noted, data are given for materials in their standard state (at 25 °C [77 °F], 100 kPa). Infobox references

Pigment Red 178 is an organic compound that is used as a pigment. Structurally, it is a derivative of perylene, although it is produced from perylenetetracarboxylic dianhydride by derivatization with 4-aminoazobenzene.
