= Vat Green 9 =

Names
- Preferred IUPAC name 16-Nitroanthra[9,1,2-cde]benzo[rst]pentaphene-5,10-dione
- Other names 16-Nitroviolanthrene-5,10-dione

Identifiers
CAS Number	128-60-9
3D model (JSmol)	Interactive image
ChemSpider	60530
ECHA InfoCard	100.004.454
PubChem CID	67187
UNII	5444DF86I5
CompTox Dashboard (EPA)	DTXSID1059575
- InChI: InChI=1S/C34H15NO4/c36-33-21-7-3-1-5-16(21)18-9-12-23-28-19(10-13-24(33)29(18)28)20-11-14-25-30-26(15-27(35(38)39)31(23)32(20)30)17-6-2-4-8-22(17)34(25)37/h1-15H Key: LNNHYUOWYOSHPH-UHFFFAOYSA-N; InChI=1/C34H15NO4/c36-33-21-7-3-1-5-16(21)18-9-12-23-28-19(10-13-24(33)29(18)28)20-11-14-25-30-26(15-27(35(38)39)31(23)32(20)30)17-6-2-4-8-22(17)34(25)37/h1-15H Key: LNNHYUOWYOSHPH-UHFFFAOYAA
- SMILES: [O-][N+](=O)c3c2c1ccc9c7c1c(c6c2c5c(c3)c4ccccc4C(=O)c5cc6)ccc7C(=O)c8ccccc89

Properties
Chemical formula	C_{34}H_{15}NO_{4}
Molar mass	501.497 g·mol^{−1}
- Except where otherwise noted, data are given for materials in their standard state (at 25 °C [77 °F], 100 kPa). Infobox references

Vat Green 9 is a green colored vat dye. It is derived from violanthrone.
