= Vat Green 1 =

Names
- Preferred IUPAC name 16,17-Dimethoxydinaphtho[1,2,3-cd:3′,2′,1′-lm]perylene-5,10-dione
- Other names Jade Green Base; Brilliant Green S; Mayvat Jade Green; Indanthren Brilliant Green B

Identifiers
CAS Number	128-58-5
3D model (JSmol)	Interactive image
ChemSpider	29140
ECHA InfoCard	100.004.452
EC Number	204-896-6
PubChem CID	31410
UNII	5C13513T4R
CompTox Dashboard (EPA)	DTXSID4044531
- InChI: InChI=1S/C36H20O4/c1-39-27-15-25-17-7-3-5-9-21(17)35(37)23-13-11-19-20-12-14-24-30-26(18-8-4-6-10-22(18)36(24)38)16-28(40-2)34(32(20)30)33(27)31(19)29(23)25/h3-16H,1-2H3 Key: JXUKQCUPTNLTCS-UHFFFAOYSA-N; InChI=1/C36H20O4/c1-39-27-15-25-17-7-3-5-9-21(17)35(37)23-13-11-19-20-12-14-24-30-26(18-8-4-6-10-22(18)36(24)38)16-28(40-2)34(32(20)30)33(27)31(19)29(23)25/h3-16H,1-2H3 Key: JXUKQCUPTNLTCS-UHFFFAOYAK
- SMILES: COC1=C2C3=C(C=CC4=C3C(=C1)C5=CC=CC=C5C4=O)C6=C7C2=C(C=C8C7=C(C=C6)C(=O)C9=CC=CC=C98)OC

Properties
Chemical formula	C_{36}H_{20}O_{4}
Molar mass	516.552 g·mol^{−1}
Appearance	dark green solid
- Except where otherwise noted, data are given for materials in their standard state (at 25 °C [77 °F], 100 kPa). Infobox references

Vat Green 1 is an organic compound that is used as a vat dye. It is a derivative of benzanthrone. It is a dark green solid. Vat Green 1 can dye viscose, silk, wool, paper, and soap.
