= Rylene dye =

Dye based on the rylene framework of naphthalene units

Pigment Violet 29 (PV29), a representative perylene pigment.

A rylene dye is a dye based on the rylene framework of naphthalene units linked in peri-positions. In homologues additional naphthalene units are added, forming compounds — or poly(peri-naphthalene)s — such as perylene, terrylene and quarterrylene.

== Perylene dyes ==
Perylene dyes are useful for their intense visible light absorption, high stability, electron accepting ability, and unity quantum yields. Due to these properties, they are actively researched in academia for optoelectronic and photovoltaic devices, thermographic processes, energy-transfer cascades, light-emitting diodes, and near-infrared-absorbing systems.

=== Molecular design features ===
Introduction of carboxylic acid and sulfonic acid groups increases the solubility of rylene dyes in water. The imide structure allows for two different substituents, so a single reactive group can be attached to this position. The HOMO/LUMO levels of perylene diimide derivatives can easily be tuned via substitution at the bay position. A bathochromic shift of about 100 nm is recorded per additional naphthalene unit.

=== Synthesis ===
Perylenediimide (PDI) are synthesized by treating perylenetetracarboxylic dianhydride (PTCDA) with amines at high temperatures.

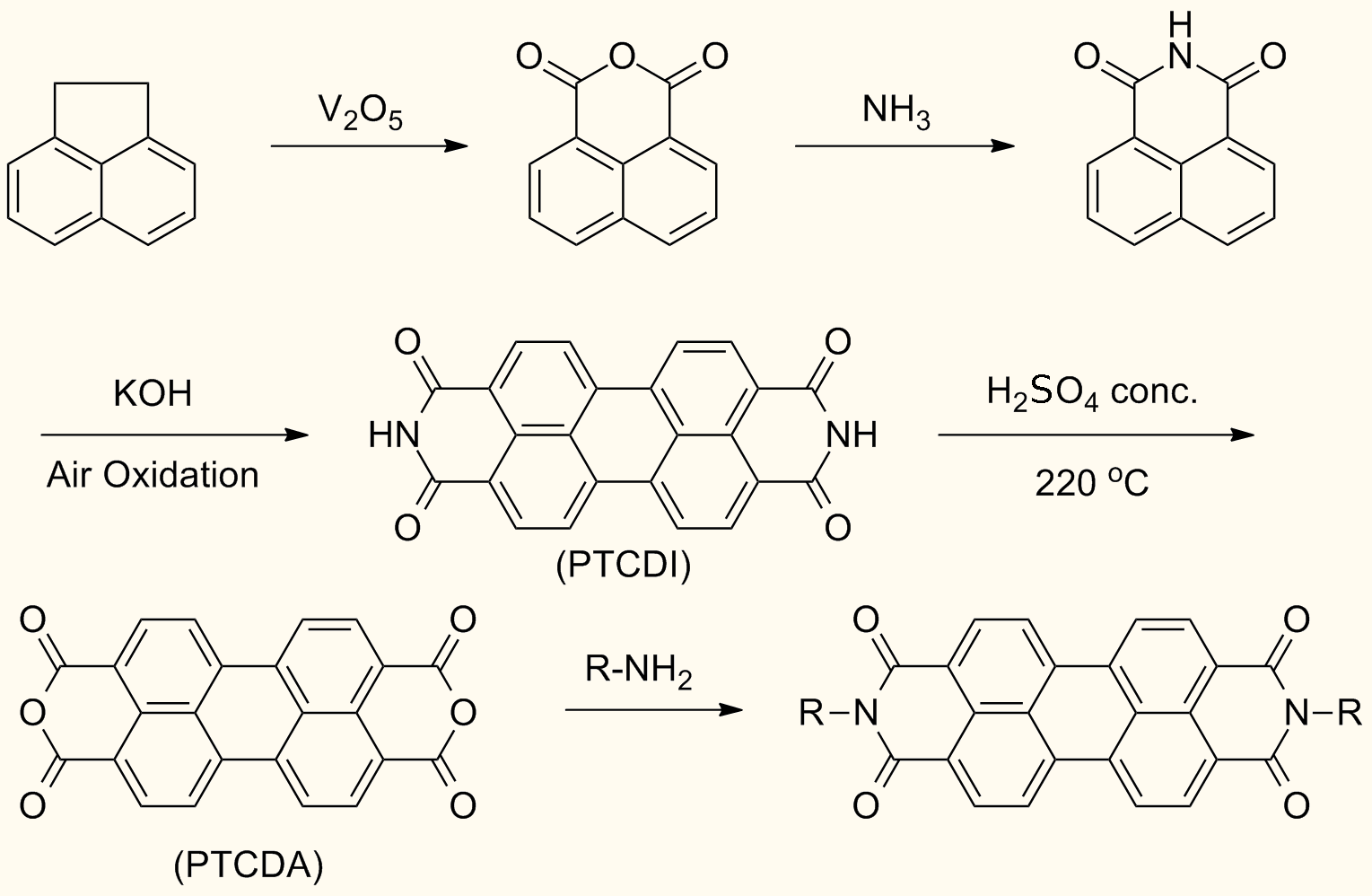

This reaction forms symmetrically N,N’- substituted PDIs. Solubilizing groups are often attached in this fashion. Although the solubility of the dianhydride is low, the solubility of some mono- and diimide derivatives are greatly improved.

== Pigments ==
Perylene diimide derivatives were developed as industrial dyes due to their excellent chemical, photo, thermal, and weather stability. Nowadays, perylene dyes are used predominantly in textile applications and as high-grade industrial paint.

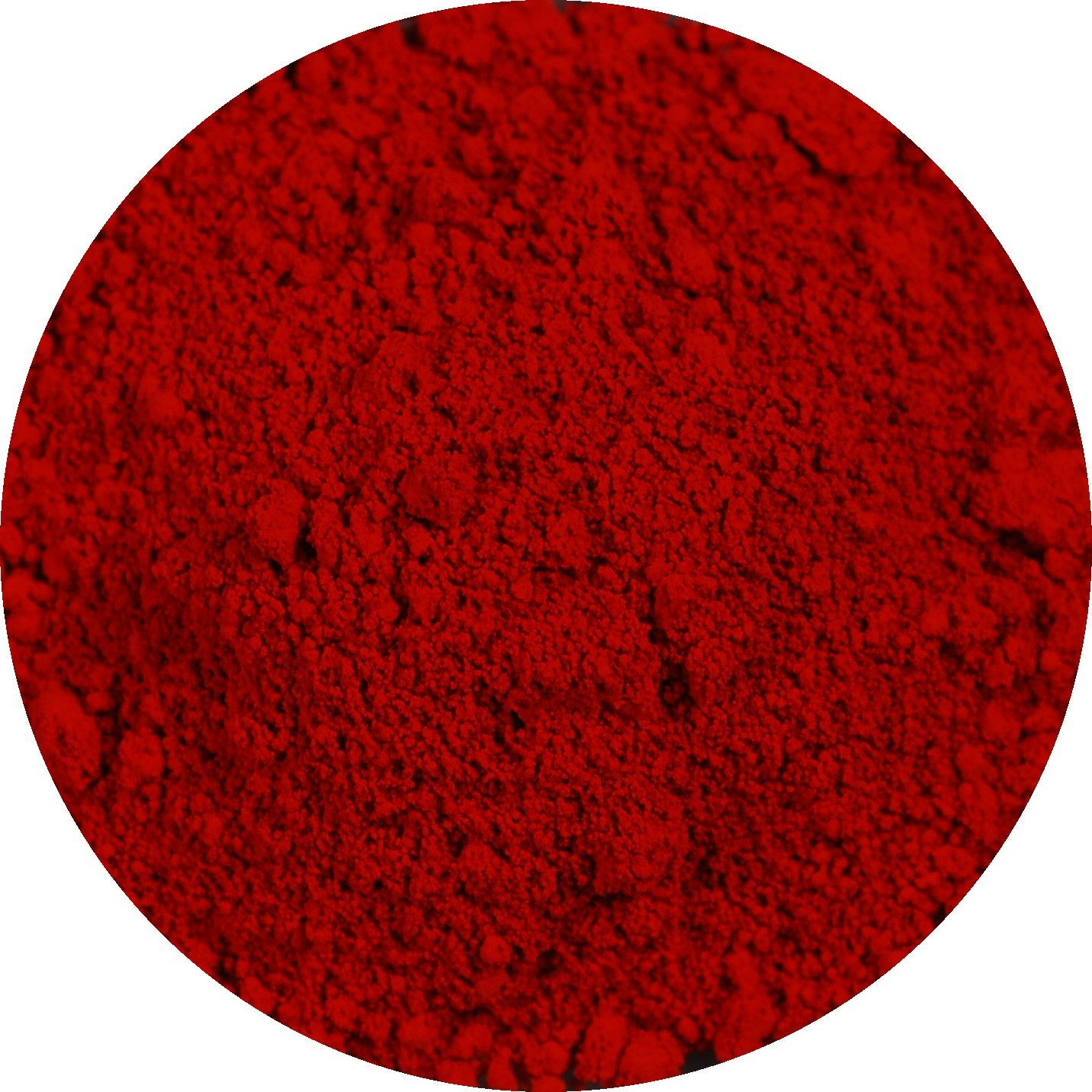
Perylene Red PR149

Several perylene pigments have been developed for artist's paints :

- Pigment red 149, a middle red, between light and dark cadmium red. (chemical structure: replace HN group in PV29 with 3,5-(CH_{3})_{2}C_{6}H_{3}).
- Pigment Red 179, which is close to alizarin crimson (chemical structure: replace HN group in PV29 with CH_{3}N).
- Perylene black 31 (chemical structure: replace HN group in PV29 with C_{6}H_{5}CH_{2}CH_{2}N)
- Rylene dyes have been less popular as fluorescent tags due to their low solubility in aqueous solutions.

== Molecular electronics ==
Perylenediimide derivatives have been incorporated as n-channel field-effect transistors due to their strong electron affinities. In particular, OFETs using highly packed perylene diimide derivatives with electron withdrawing groups such were found to have good air stability. Close molecular packing is important in retaining air stability. Electron transfer, on the other hand, was strongly influenced by the π-π stacking between perylene diimide units.

Perylene diimide derivatives are suitable as acceptor materials due to their high electron affinity and high electron mobilities.

== Additional reading ==
- https://web.archive.org/web/20090809215020/http://www.mpip-mainz.mpg.de/synthchem/rylene.html
