= Pigment Red 190 =

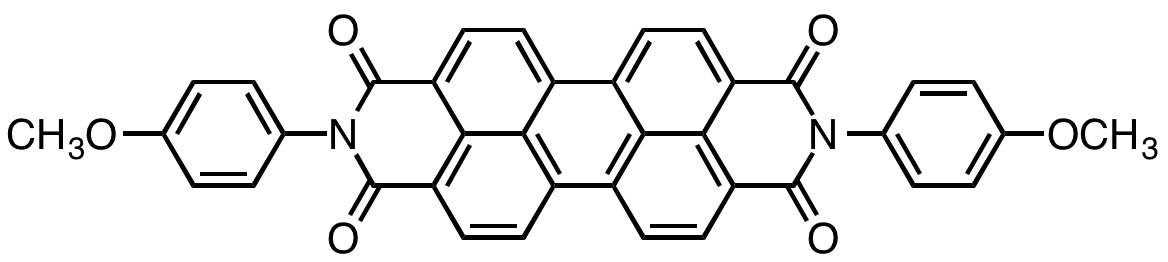

Names
- Preferred IUPAC name 2,9-Bis(4-methoxyphenyl)anthra[2,1,9-def:6,5,10-d′e′f′]diisoquinoline-1,3,8,10(2H,9H)-tetrone

Identifiers
CAS Number	6424-77-7
3D model (JSmol)	Interactive image
ChemSpider	73016
ECHA InfoCard	100.026.534
EC Number	229-187-9
PubChem CID	80898
UNII	489VV3O90B
CompTox Dashboard (EPA)	DTXSID3064352
- InChI: InChI=1S/C38H22N2O6/c1-45-21-7-3-19(4-8-21)39-35(41)27-15-11-23-25-13-17-29-34-30(38(44)40(37(29)43)20-5-9-22(46-2)10-6-20)18-14-26(32(25)34)24-12-16-28(36(39)42)33(27)31(23)24/h3-18H,1-2H3 Key: VZFVREBNFMQPSI-UHFFFAOYSA-N
- SMILES: COc1ccc(cc1)N2C(=O)c3ccc4c5ccc6c7c5c(ccc7C(=O)N(C6=O)c8ccc(cc8)OC)c9c4c3c(cc9)C2=O

Properties
Chemical formula	C_{38}H_{22}N_{2}O_{6}
Molar mass	602.59 g/mol
Appearance	Dark red solid
- Except where otherwise noted, data are given for materials in their standard state (at 25 °C [77 °F], 100 kPa). Infobox references

Pigment Red 190 (C.I. 71140), also called Vat Red 29, is a synthetic organic compound that is used both as a pigment and as a vat dye. Although structurally a derivative of perylene, it is produced from acenaphthene.

It is usually applied for cotton fabric, jig dyeing, PVA and silk dyeing, still may processed into organic pigment.
