= Dibenzpyrenequinone =

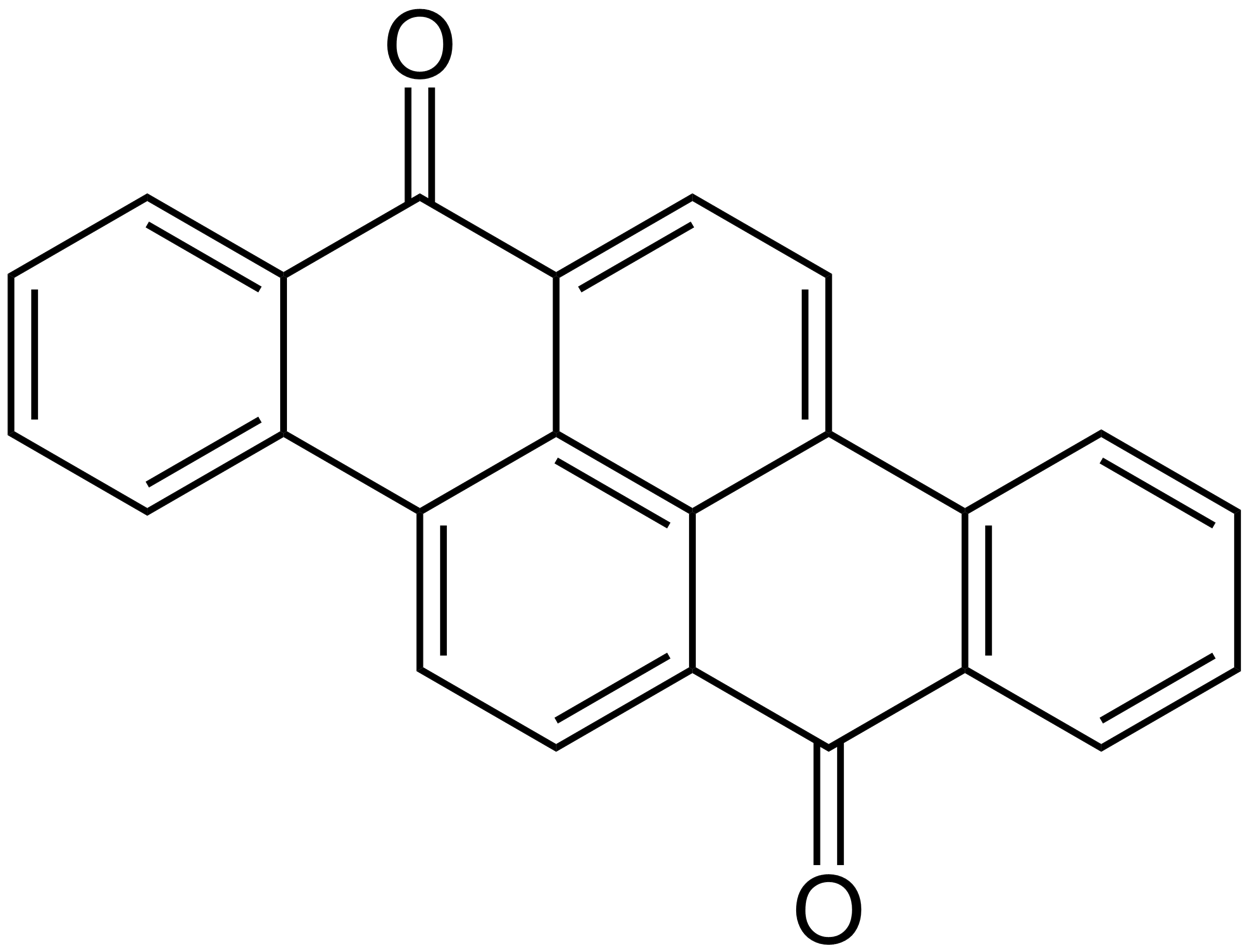
- Skeletal formula

Names
- Preferred IUPAC name Dibenzo[c,pqr]tetraphene-7,14-dione
- Other names Vat yellow 4 Golden Yellow GK; Dibenzochrysenedione; Tyrian Yellow I-GOK; C.I. 59100; Dibenzo[b,def]chrysene-7,14-dione; 3,4:8,9-dibenzopyrene-5,10-dione

Identifiers
CAS Number	128-66-5
3D model (JSmol)	Interactive image
ChEBI	CHEBI:82548
ChemSpider	29142
ECHA InfoCard	100.004.459
EC Number	204-903-2
KEGG	C19545
PubChem CID	31412
UNII	8XO6A4G496
CompTox Dashboard (EPA)	DTXSID6021454
- InChI: InChI=1S/C24H12O2/c25-23-17-7-3-1-5-13(17)15-9-11-20-22-16(10-12-19(23)21(15)22)14-6-2-4-8-18(14)24(20)26/h1-12H Key: ZTWQZJLUUZHJGS-UHFFFAOYSA-N; InChI=1/C24H12O2/c25-23-17-7-3-1-5-13(17)15-9-11-20-22-16(10-12-19(23)21(15)22)14-6-2-4-8-18(14)24(20)26/h1-12H Key: ZTWQZJLUUZHJGS-UHFFFAOYAD
- SMILES: O=C2c1ccccc1c6c5c2ccc4c3ccccc3C(=O)c(c45)cc6

Properties
Chemical formula	C_{24}H_{12}O_{2}
Molar mass	332.358 g·mol^{−1}
Appearance	yellow solid
Density	1.418g/cm3
Melting point	385 °C (725 °F; 658 K)
Boiling point	606.7 °C (1,124.1 °F; 879.9 K) at 760 mmHg
Solubility in water	insoluble
Magnetic susceptibility (χ)	−250.3·10^{−6} cm^{3}/mol

Hazards
- Occupational safety and health (OHS/OSH)
Main hazards	Possible carcinogen
Flash point	219.93 °C (427.87 °F; 493.08 K)
- Except where otherwise noted, data are given for materials in their standard state (at 25 °C [77 °F], 100 kPa). verify (what is ?) Infobox references

Dibenzpyrenequinone is a synthetic vat dye. It is a bright yellow solid. It can be produced by cyclization of 1,5-dibenzoylnaphthalene. Dibenzpyrenequinone is a precursor to Vat Orange 1.

== See also ==
- Dibromoanthanthrone,Vat Orange 3
