= Benzanthrone =

- Skeletal formula of benzanthrone

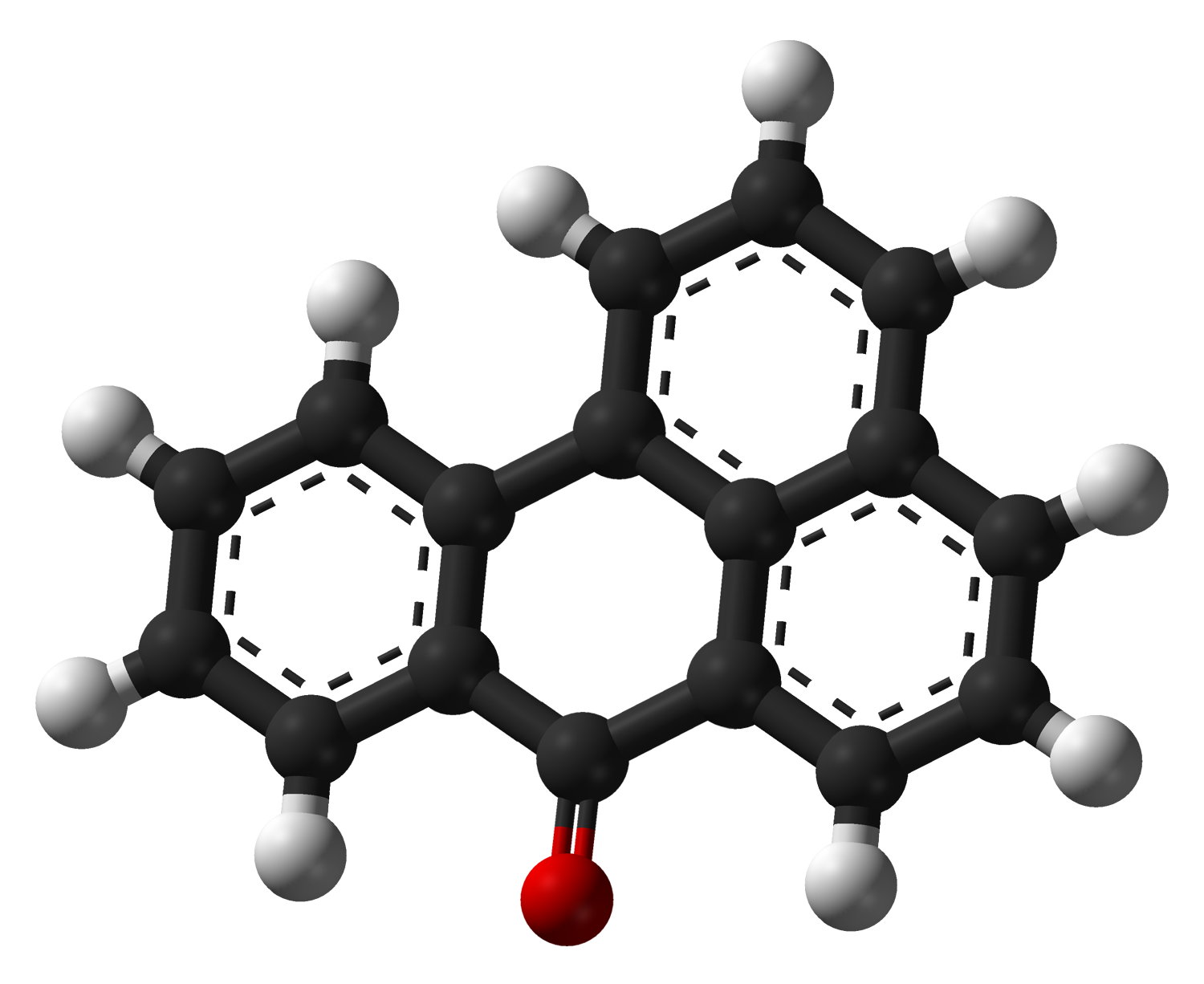
- Ball-and-stick model

Names
- Preferred IUPAC name 7H-Benzo[de]anthracen-7-one
- Other names Benzanthrenone; 1,9-Benzanthrone; MS-Benzanthrone; Mesobenzanthrone; Naphtanthrone; 7H-Benz(de)anthracene-7-one; 7-Oxobenz(de)anthracene

Identifiers
CAS Number	82-05-3
3D model (JSmol)	Interactive image
ChEBI	CHEBI:93350
ChEMBL	ChEMBL1607517
ChemSpider	6442
ECHA InfoCard	100.001.268
EC Number	201-393-3
PubChem CID	6697
UNII	LP5P3RR8QN
UN number	2811
CompTox Dashboard (EPA)	DTXSID8052566
- InChI: InChI=1S/C17H10O/c18-17-14-8-2-1-7-12(14)13-9-3-5-11-6-4-10-15(17)16(11)13/h1-10H Key: HUKPVYBUJRAUAG-UHFFFAOYSA-N; InChI=1/C17H10O/c18-17-14-8-2-1-7-12(14)13-9-3-5-11-6-4-10-15(17)16(11)13/h1-10H Key: HUKPVYBUJRAUAG-UHFFFAOYAL
- SMILES: O=C3c4c(c2cccc1cccc3c12)cccc4

Properties
Chemical formula	C_{17}H_{10}O
Molar mass	230.266 g·mol^{−1}
Appearance	Light yellow to brown-green solid
Melting point	170 °C (338 °F; 443 K)
Solubility in water	Insoluble

Hazards
- GHS labelling
Pictograms	(GHS07: Exclamation mark)
Signal word	Warning
Hazard statements	H315, H319, H335
Precautionary statements	P261, P264, P271, P280, P302+P352, P304+P340, P305+P351+P338, P312, P321, P332+P313, P337+P313, P362, P403+P233, P405, P501
- Except where otherwise noted, data are given for materials in their standard state (at 25 °C [77 °F], 100 kPa). verify (what is ?) Infobox references

Benzanthrone (BZA) is a polycyclic aromatic ketone. It is a yellow solid. Its derivatives are used as a dyestuff intermediate for anthraquinone-based dyes. Dehydrogenative coupling gives violanthrone. It is prepared by reduction of anthroquinone to anthrone followed by alkylation with a mixture of glycerol and sulfuric acid.

It is a basic substance with fluorescent and luminescent properties. It can be used for photosensitization, and as a charge transport material. It is also used in pyrotechnics industry, mainly as a component of some older formulations of green and yellow colored smokes, often together with Vat Yellow 4; its US military specification is MIL-D-50074D.

== Safety ==
Benzanthrone causes itching and burning sensations on exposed skin, together with erythema, dermatitis, and skin pigmentation.

== See also ==
- 3-Nitrobenzanthrone
