= Vat Blue 36 =

Names
- IUPAC name 5-Chloro-2-(5,7-dichloro-3-oxo-1-benzothiophen-2(3H)-ylidene)-7-methoxy-4-methyl-1,2-dihydro-3H-indol-3-one

Identifiers
CAS Number	6424-69-7
3D model (JSmol)	Interactive image
ChemSpider	23351917
ECHA InfoCard	100.124.644
PubChem CID	53439004
UNII	88P9Z5VZ5H
CompTox Dashboard (EPA)	DTXSID10701657
- InChI: InChI=1S/C18H10Cl3NO3S/c1-6-9(20)5-11(25-2)13-12(6)16(24)14(22-13)18-15(23)8-3-7(19)4-10(21)17(8)26-18/h3-5,22H,1-2H3 Key: CFDCBVJUEASQPX-UHFFFAOYSA-N; InChI=1/C18H10Cl3NO3S/c1-6-9(20)5-11(25-2)13-12(6)16(24)14(22-13)18-15(23)8-3-7(19)4-10(21)17(8)26-18/h3-5,22H,1-2H3 Key: CFDCBVJUEASQPX-UHFFFAOYAI
- SMILES: Cc1c(cc(c2c1C(=O)C(=C3C(=O)c4cc(cc(c4S3)Cl)Cl)N2)OC)Cl

Properties
Chemical formula	C_{18}H_{10}Cl_{3}NO_{3}S
Molar mass	426.69 g·mol^{−1}
- Except where otherwise noted, data are given for materials in their standard state (at 25 °C [77 °F], 100 kPa). Infobox references

Vat Blue 36 is a vat dye that is chemically related to indigo. It is produced by condensation of 4-methyl-5-chloro-7-methoxy-3-indolinone and 5,7–dichloro-3-(2H)-thianaphthenone.
