= 3-Nitrobenzanthrone =

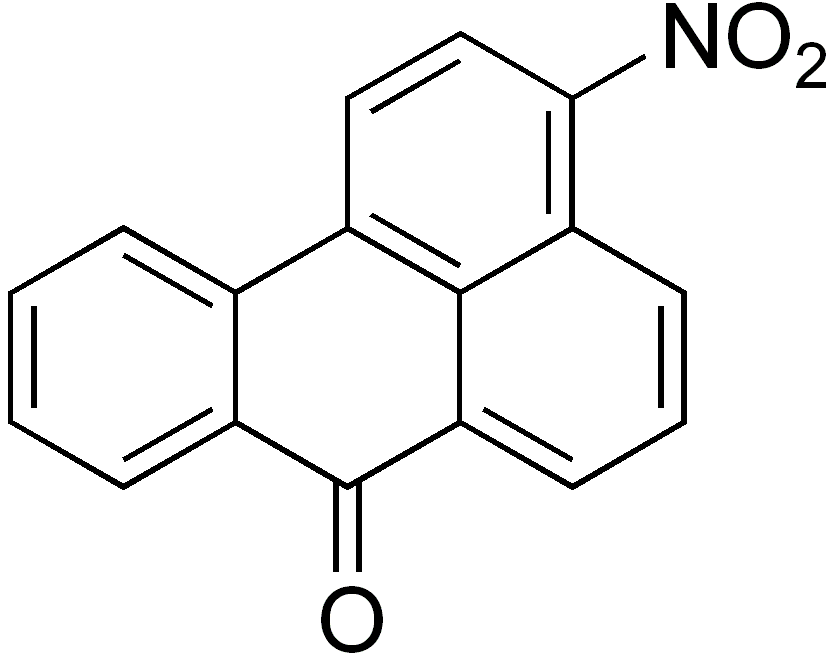

Names
- Preferred IUPAC name 3-Nitro-7H-benzo[de]anthracen-7-one

Identifiers
CAS Number	17117-34-9
3D model (JSmol)	Interactive image; Interactive image
ChemSpider	2103821
KEGG	C20824
PubChem CID	2825690
UNII	O4OJW7BC7W
CompTox Dashboard (EPA)	DTXSID60881271
- InChI: InChI=1S/C17H9NO3/c19-17-12-5-2-1-4-10(12)11-8-9-15(18(20)21)13-6-3-7-14(17)16(11)13/h1-9H Key: QAJOWHGESRCVLY-UHFFFAOYSA-N; InChI=1/C17H9NO3/c19-17-12-5-2-1-4-10(12)11-8-9-15(18(20)21)13-6-3-7-14(17)16(11)13/h1-9H Key: QAJOWHGESRCVLY-UHFFFAOYAK
- SMILES: O=C2C1=CC=CC=C1C4=C3C2=CC=CC3C([N+]([O-])=O)C=C4; [O-][N+](=O)c2c1cccc4c1c(cc2)c3c(cccc3)C4=O

Properties
Chemical formula	C_{17}H_{9}NO_{3}
Molar mass	275.26 g/mol
Melting point	248 °C (478 °F; 521 K)

Hazards
- Occupational safety and health (OHS/OSH)
Main hazards	extremely carcinogenic
- Except where otherwise noted, data are given for materials in their standard state (at 25 °C [77 °F], 100 kPa). verify (what is ?) Infobox references

3-Nitrobenzanthrone (3-nitro-7H-benz[de]anthracen-7-one) is a chemical compound emitted in diesel exhaust; it is a potent carcinogen. It produced the highest score ever reported in the Ames test, a standard measure of the cancer-causing potential of toxic chemicals, far greater than the previous known strongest (1,8-dinitropyrene, which is also found in diesel exhaust).

== See also ==
- Benzanthrone
