= Vat Orange 1 =

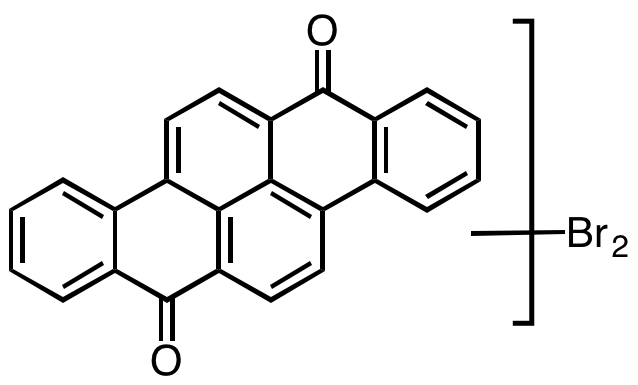

Identifiers
CAS Number	3564-71-4
3D model (JSmol)	Interactive image
ChemSpider	2121280
PubChem CID	2844775
- InChI: InChI=1S/C24H10Br2O2/c25-11-1-3-13-15-5-7-18-22-16(14-4-2-12(26)10-20(14)24(18)28)6-8-17(21(15)22)23(27)19(13)9-11/h1-10H Key: SMLJXADQTZYMKX-UHFFFAOYSA-N
- SMILES: C1=CC2=C(C=C1Br)C(=O)C3=CC=C4C5=C(C=C(C=C5)Br)C(=O)C6=C4C3=C2C=C6

Properties
Chemical formula	C_{24}H_{10}Br_{2}O_{2}
Molar mass	490.150 g·mol^{−1}
- Except where otherwise noted, data are given for materials in their standard state (at 25 °C [77 °F], 100 kPa). Infobox references

Vat Orange 1 is an orange-hue synthetic vat dye. It is prepared by dibromination of Dibenzpyrenequinone, also known as Vat Yellow 4.
