= Acenaphthylene =

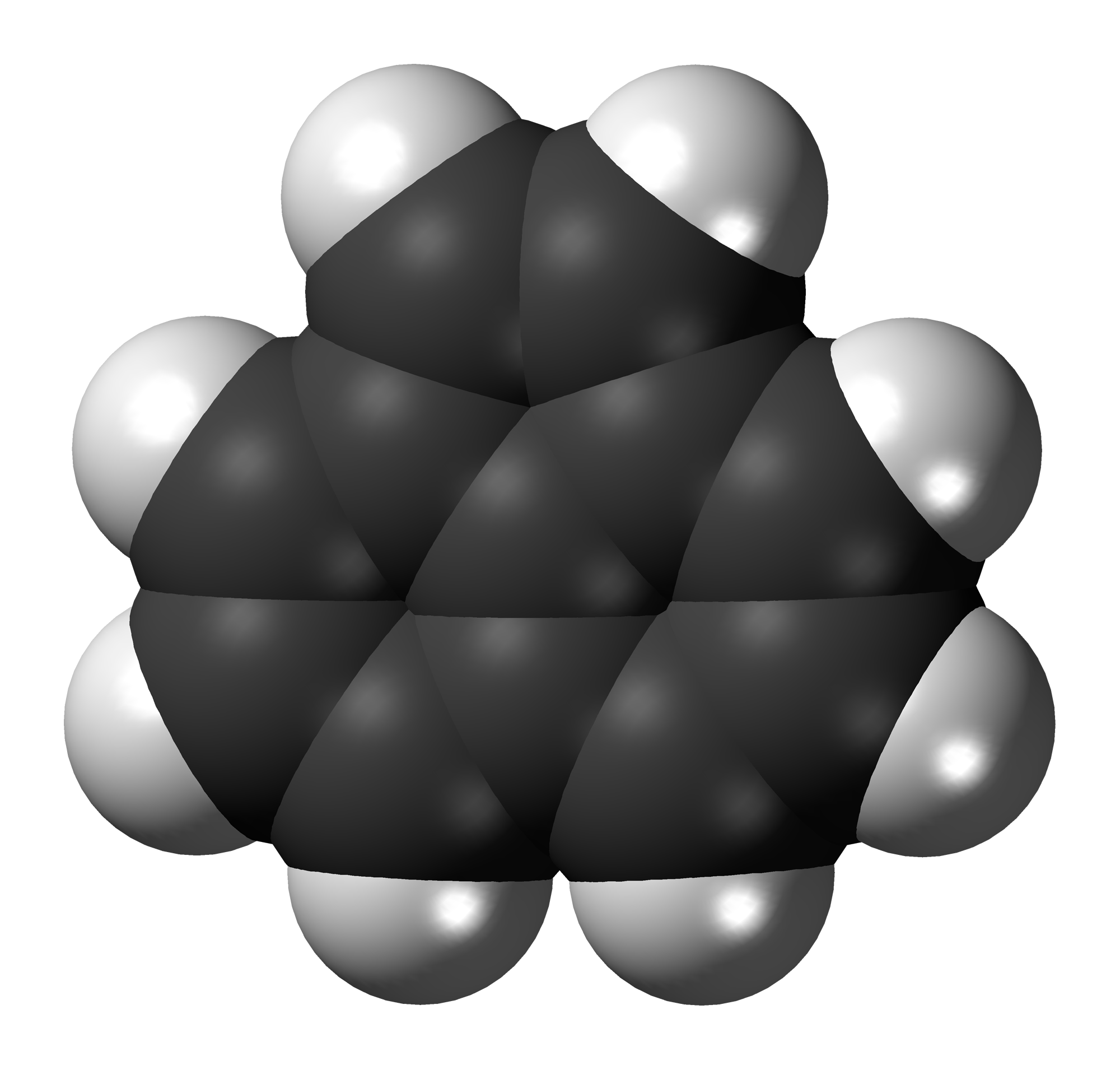

Names
- Preferred IUPAC name Acenaphthylene
- Other names Cyclopenta[de]naphthalene; Acenaphthalene; Tricyclo[6.3.1.0^{4,12}]dodeca-1(12),2,4,6,8,10-hexaene; Tricyclo[6.3.1.0^{4,12}]dodecahexaene

Identifiers
CAS Number	208-96-8
3D model (JSmol)	Interactive image; Interactive image
ChEBI	CHEBI:33081
ChemSpider	8807
ECHA InfoCard	100.005.380
PubChem CID	9161
UNII	1Z25C36811
CompTox Dashboard (EPA)	DTXSID3023845
- InChI: InChI=1S/C12H8/c1-3-9-4-2-6-11-8-7-10(5-1)12(9)11/h1-8H Key: HXGDTGSAIMULJN-UHFFFAOYSA-N; InChI=1/C12H8/c1-3-9-4-2-6-11-8-7-10(5-1)12(9)11/h1-8H Key: HXGDTGSAIMULJN-UHFFFAOYAQ
- SMILES: c3cc1cccc2\C=C/c(c12)c3; c1cc2cccc3c2c(c1)C=C3

Properties
Chemical formula	C_{12}H_{8}
Molar mass	152.196 g·mol^{−1}
Appearance	Yellow crystals
Density	0.8987 g cm^{−3}
Melting point	91.8 °C (197.2 °F; 364.9 K)
Boiling point	280 °C (536 °F; 553 K)
Solubility in water	Insoluble
Solubility in ethanol	very soluble
Solubility in diethyl ether	very soluble
Solubility in benzene	very soluble
Solubility in chloroform	soluble

Thermochemistry
Heat capacity (C)	166.4 J mol^{−1} K^{−1}
Enthalpy of fusion (Δ_{f}H^{⦵}_{fus})	186.7 kJ mol^{−1}
Enthalpy of vaporization (Δ_{f}H_{vap})	69 kJ mol^{−1}
Enthalpy of sublimation (Δ_{f}H_{sublim})	71.06 kJ mol^{−1}

Hazards
- GHS labelling
Pictograms	(GHS06: Toxic) (GHS07: Exclamation mark)
Signal word	Danger
Hazard statements	H302, H310, H315, H319, H330, H335
Precautionary statements	P260, P262, P264, P270, P271, P280, P284, P301+P312, P302+P350, P302+P352, P304+P340, P305+P351+P338, P310, P312, P320, P321, P330, P332+P313, P337+P313, P361, P362, P363, P403+P233, P405, P501
Flash point	122 °C (252 °F; 395 K)

Related compounds
Related compounds	acenaphthene
- Except where otherwise noted, data are given for materials in their standard state (at 25 °C [77 °F], 100 kPa). verify (what is ?) Infobox references

Acenaphthylene, a polycyclic aromatic hydrocarbon is an ortho- and peri-fused tricyclic hydrocarbon. The molecule resembles naphthalene with positions 1 and 8 connected by a −CH=CH− unit. It is a yellow solid. Unlike many polycyclic aromatic hydrocarbons, it has no fluorescence.

== Occurrence ==
Acenaphthylene occurs as about 2% of coal tar. It is produced industrially by gas-phase dehydrogenation of acenaphthene.

== Reactions ==
Hydrogenation gives the more saturated compound acenaphthene. Chemical reduction affords the radical anion sodium or potassium acenaphthalenide, which is used as a strong reductant (E = −2.26 V versus FC).

It functions as a ligand for some organometallic compounds.

== Uses ==
Polymerisation of acenaphthylene with acetylene in the presence of a Lewis acid catalyst gives electrically-conductive polymers. Acenaphthylene possesses excellent properties as an antioxidant in cross-linked polyethylene and ethylene propylene rubber. Thermal trimerization of acenaphthylene leads to decacyclene, which can be further processed to sulfur dyes.

== Toxicity ==
The no-observed-adverse-effect level of acenaphthylene after repeated 28-day oral administration to both male and female rats was found to be 4 mg/kg/day.
