= Perylenetetracarboxylic dianhydride =

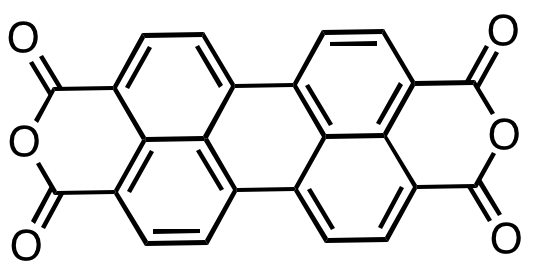

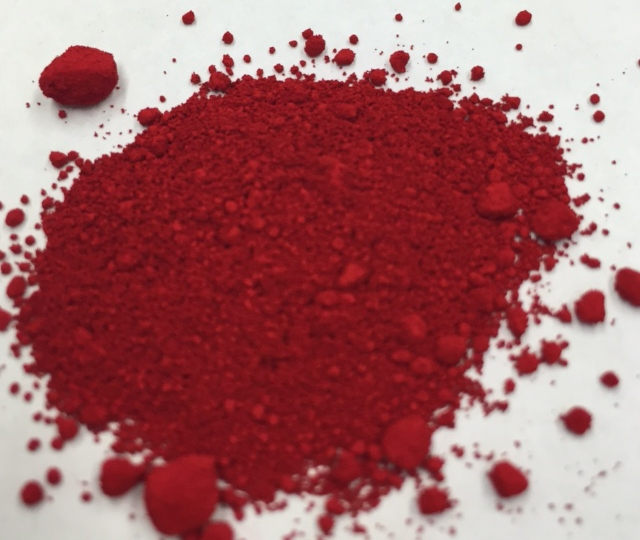

Names
- Preferred IUPAC name Peryleno[3,4-cd:9,11-c′d′]dipyran-3,5,10,12-tetrone
- Other names Perylene-3,4,9,10-tetracarboxylic dianhydride, Pigment Red 224

Identifiers
CAS Number	128-69-8
3D model (JSmol)	Interactive image
ChemSpider	60534
ECHA InfoCard	100.004.461
EC Number	204-905-3
PubChem CID	67191
UNII	NH27FW2PET
CompTox Dashboard (EPA)	DTXSID1059577
- InChI: InChI=1S/C24H8O6/c25-21-13-5-1-9-10-2-6-15-20-16(24(28)30-23(15)27)8-4-12(18(10)20)11-3-7-14(22(26)29-21)19(13)17(9)11/h1-8H Key: CLYVDMAATCIVBF-UHFFFAOYSA-N; InChI=1/C24H8O6/c25-21-13-5-1-9-10-2-6-15-20-16(24(28)30-23(15)27)8-4-12(18(10)20)11-3-7-14(22(26)29-21)19(13)17(9)11/h1-8H Key: CLYVDMAATCIVBF-UHFFFAOYAS
- SMILES: c1cc2c3c(ccc4c3c1c5ccc6c7c5c4ccc7C(=O)OC6=O)C(=O)OC2=O

Properties
Chemical formula	C_{24}H_{8}O_{6}
Molar mass	392.32
Density	1.7 g/cm^{3}
Melting point	~350 °C

Structure
Crystal structure	Monoclinic, P2_{1}/c
- Except where otherwise noted, data are given for materials in their standard state (at 25 °C [77 °F], 100 kPa). Infobox references

Perylenetetracarboxylic dianhydride (PTCDA) is an organic dye molecule and an organic semiconductor. It is used as a precursor to a class of molecules known as Rylene dyes, which are useful as pigments and dyes. It is a dark red solid with low solubility in aromatic solvents. The compound has attracted much interest as an organic semiconductor.

== Structure ==
PTCDA consists of a perylene core to which two anhydride groups have been attached, one at either side. It occurs in two crystalline forms, α and β. Both have the P2_{1}/c monoclinic symmetry and a density of ca. 1.7 g/cm^{3}, which is relatively high for organic compounds. Their lattice parameters are:

Form	a	b	c	γ
α	0.374 nm	1.196 nm	1.734 nm	98.8°
β	0.378 nm	1.930 nm	1.077 nm	83.6°

=== Self-assembly and films ===
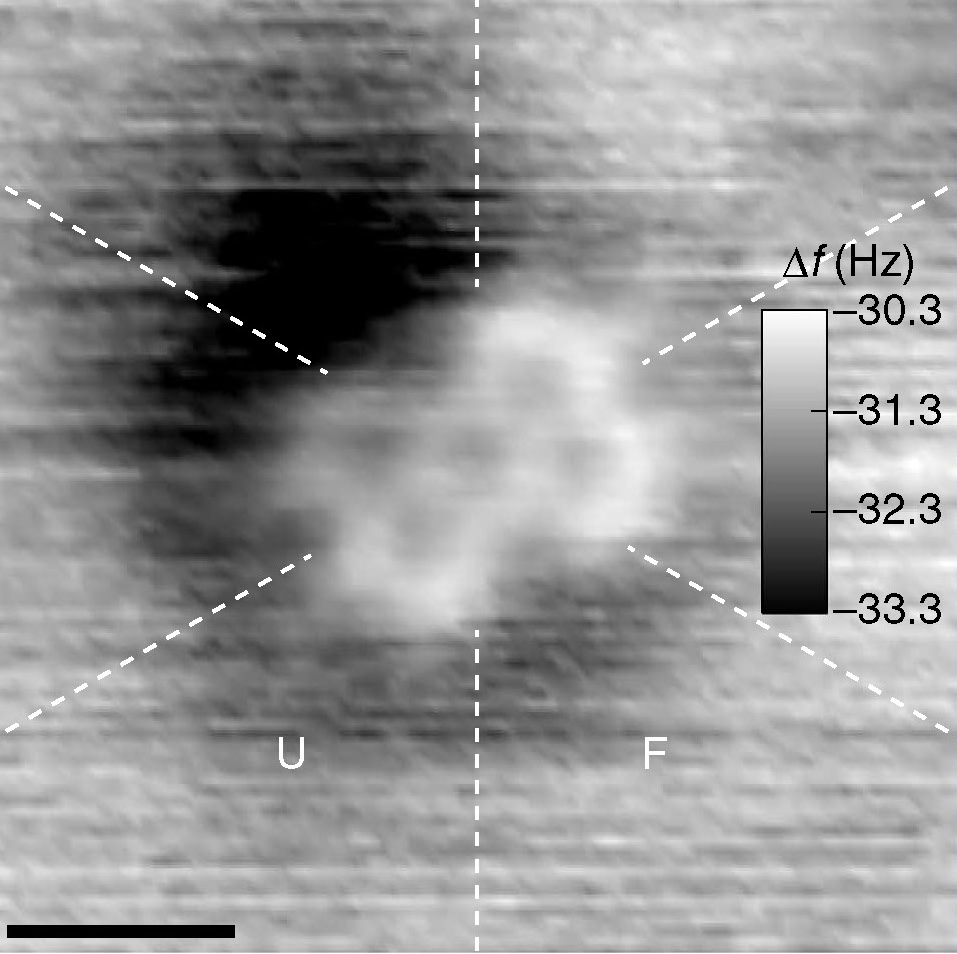
Atomic force microscopy image of a single PTCDA molecule on Si at room temperature.

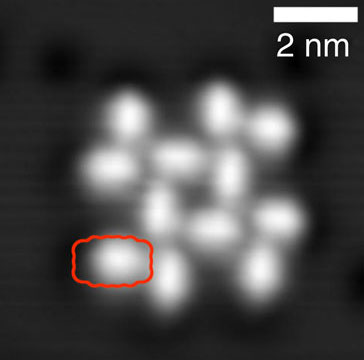
Self-assembly of PTCDA molecules on NaCl, scanning tunneling microscopy image.

== Use ==
The main industrial use of PTCDA is as a precursor to Rylene dyes.
