= Violanthrone =

Names
- Preferred IUPAC name Anthra[10,1,2-cde]benzo[rst]pentaphene-5,10-dione
- Other names Dibenzanthrone, Tinon Dark Blue BOA, Ahcovat Dark Blue BO, Violanthrone A, Bianthrone A, Irgalite Blue 2R, Paradone Dark Blue

Identifiers
CAS Number	116-71-2
3D model (JSmol)	Interactive image
ChemSpider	8015
ECHA InfoCard	100.003.775
EC Number	204-152-0
PubChem CID	8317
UNII	VH1DQP6QPQ
CompTox Dashboard (EPA)	DTXSID7026281
- InChI: InChI=1S/C34H16O2/c35-33-25-7-3-1-5-17(25)19-9-11-21-22-12-10-20-18-6-2-4-8-26(18)34(36)28-16-14-24(30(22)32(20)28)23-13-15-27(33)31(19)29(21)23/h1-16H Key: YKSGNOMLAIJTLT-UHFFFAOYSA-N; InChI=1/C34H16O2/c35-33-25-7-3-1-5-17(25)19-9-11-21-22-12-10-20-18-6-2-4-8-26(18)34(36)28-16-14-24(30(22)32(20)28)23-13-15-27(33)31(19)29(21)23/h1-16H Key: YKSGNOMLAIJTLT-UHFFFAOYAP
- SMILES: c1ccc2c(c1)-c3ccc4c5ccc-6c7c5c(ccc7C(=O)c8c6cccc8)c9c4c3c(cc9)C2=O

Properties
Chemical formula	C_{34}H_{16}O_{2}
Molar mass	456.48964
Appearance	dark blue solid
Density	1.53 g/cm3
Melting point	492 °C (decomposes)
Magnetic susceptibility (χ)	−204.8·10^{−6} cm^{3}/mol
- Except where otherwise noted, data are given for materials in their standard state (at 25 °C [77 °F], 100 kPa). Infobox references

Violanthrone, also known as dibenzanthrone, is an organic compound that serves as a vat dye and a precursor to other vat dyes. X-ray crystallography confirms that the molecule is planar with C_{2v} symmetry. Isomeric with violanthrone is isoviolanthrone, which has a centrosymmetric structure.

== Synthesis ==
It is produced by coupling of two molecules of benzanthrone.
