= Acenaphthene =

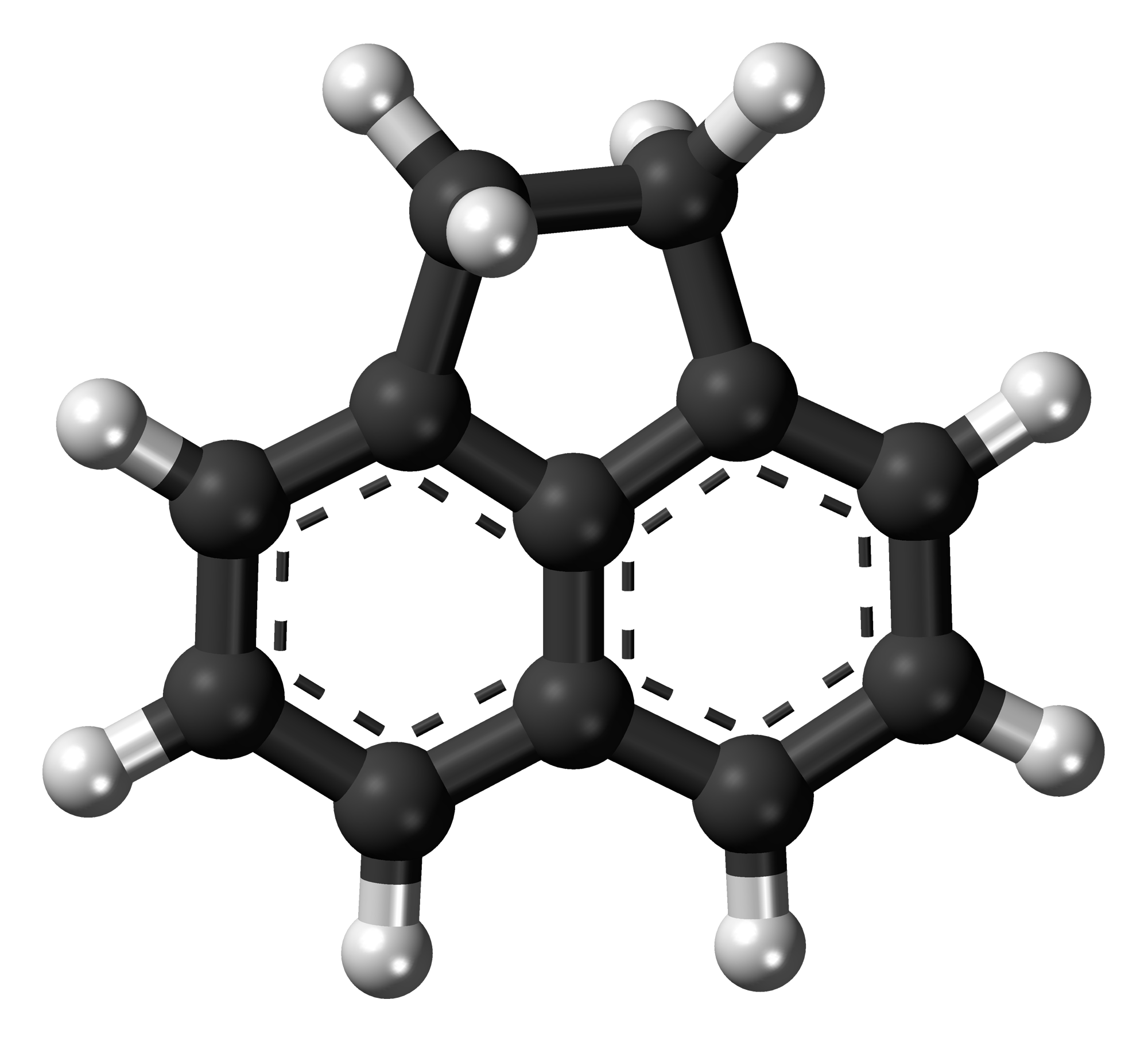

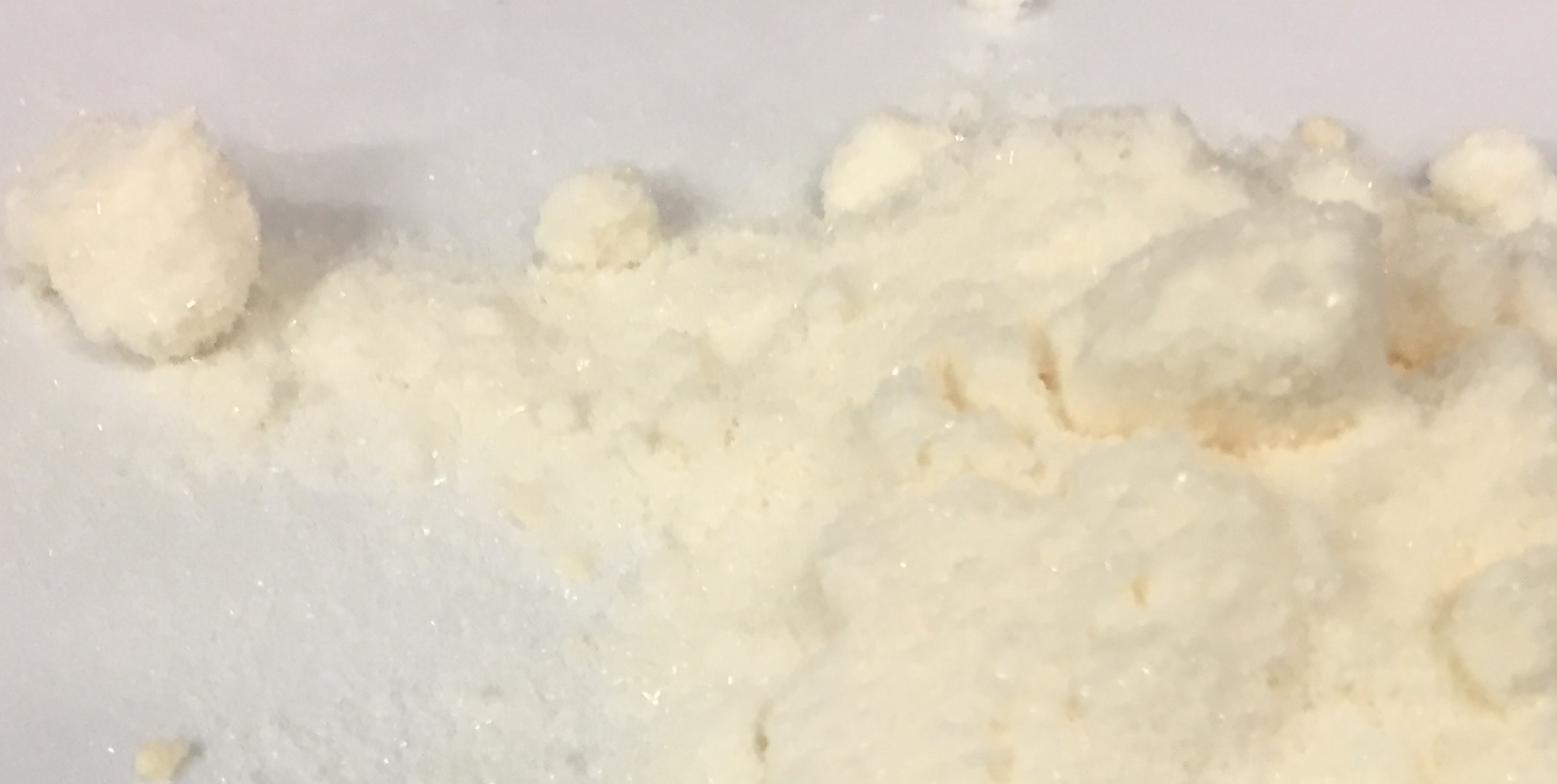

Names
- Preferred IUPAC name 1,2-Dihydroacenaphthylene
- Other names 1,8-Ethylenenaphthalene peri-Ethylenenaphthalene; Naphthyleneethylene; Tricyclo[6.3.1.0^{4,12}]dodecapentaene; Tricyclo[6.3.1.0^{4,12}]dodeca-1(12),4,6,8,10-pentaene

Identifiers
CAS Number	83-32-9
3D model (JSmol)	Interactive image; Interactive image
ChEBI	CHEBI:22154
ChEMBL	ChEMBL1797271
ChemSpider	6478
ECHA InfoCard	100.001.336
EC Number	201-469-6
KEGG	C19312
PubChem CID	6734
RTECS number	AB1000000
UNII	V8UT1GAC5Y
UN number	3077
CompTox Dashboard (EPA)	DTXSID3021774
- InChI: InChI=1S/C12H10/c1-3-9-4-2-6-11-8-7-10(5-1)12(9)11/h1-6H,7-8H2 Key: CWRYPZZKDGJXCA-UHFFFAOYSA-N; InChI=1/C12H10/c1-3-9-4-2-6-11-8-7-10(5-1)12(9)11/h1-6H,7-8H2 Key: CWRYPZZKDGJXCA-UHFFFAOYAW
- SMILES: c2cc1cccc3c1c(c2)CC3; c1cc2cccc3c2c(c1)CC3

Properties
Chemical formula	C_{12}H_{10}
Molar mass	154.212 g·mol^{−1}
Appearance	White or pale yellow crystalline powder
Density	1.024 g/cm^{3}
Melting point	93.4 °C (200.1 °F; 366.5 K)
Boiling point	279 °C (534 °F; 552 K)
Solubility in water	0.4 mg/100 ml
Solubility in ethanol	slight
Solubility in chloroform	slight
Solubility in benzene	very soluble
Solubility in acetic acid	soluble
Vapor pressure	0.001 to 0.01 mmHg at 20 °C; 5 mmHg at 114.8 °C
Magnetic susceptibility (χ)	−0.709×10^{−6} cm^{3}/g

Thermochemistry
Heat capacity (C)	190.4 J mol^{−1} K^{−1}
Std molar entropy (S^{⦵}_{298})	188.9 J mol^{−1} K^{−1}
Std enthalpy of formation (Δ_{f}H^{⦵}_{298})	70.3 kJ mol^{−1}

Hazards
NFPA 704 (fire diamond)	2 1 1
Flash point	135 °C (275 °F; 408 K)
Autoignition temperature	> 450 °C (842 °F; 723 K)
Safety data sheet (SDS)	ICSC 1674
- Except where otherwise noted, data are given for materials in their standard state (at 25 °C [77 °F], 100 kPa). verify (what is ?) Infobox references

Acenaphthene is a polycyclic aromatic hydrocarbon (PAH) consisting of naphthalene with an ethylene bridge connecting positions 1 and 8. It is a colourless solid. Coal tar consists of about 0.3% of this compound.

== Production and reactions ==
Acenaphthene was prepared for the first time in 1866 by Marcellin Berthelot by reacting hot naphthalene vapours with acetylene, and a year later he reproduced a similar reaction with ethylene as well as discovered acenaphthene in coal tar. Later Berthelot and Bardy synthesized the compound by cyclization of α-ethylnaphthalene. Industrially, it is still obtained from coal tar together with its derivative acenaphthylene (and many other compounds).

Like other arenes, acenaphthene forms complexes with low valent metal centers. One example is (η^{6}-acenaphthene)Mn(CO)_{3}]^{+}.

== Uses ==
It is used on a large scale to prepare naphthalene dicarboxylic anhydride, which is a precursor to dyes and optical brighteners (such as 1,4-bis(2-benzoxazolyl)naphthalene). Besides that, the anhydride is also the precursor to perylenetetracarboxylic dianhydride, precursor to several commercial pigments and dyes.

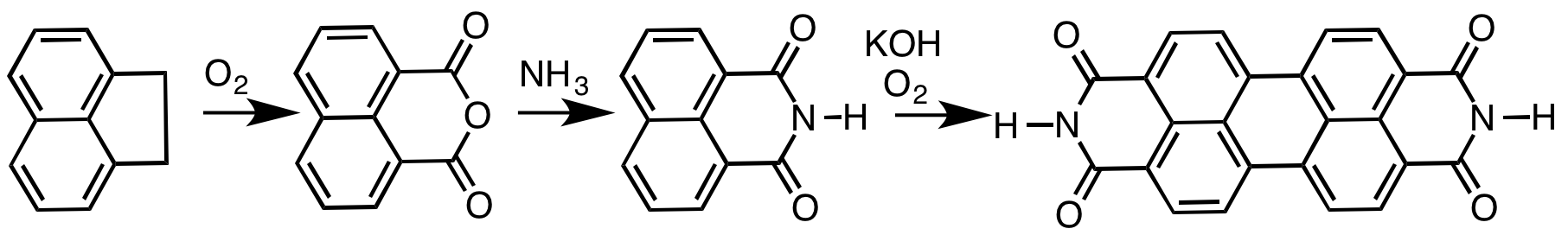
