= Vat dye =

Class of dyes used with cellulose fiber such as cotton

Vat dyes are a class of dyes that are classified as such because of the method by which they are applied. Vat dyeing is a process that refers to dyeing that takes place in a bucket or vat. The original vat dye is indigo, once obtained only from plants but now often produced synthetically.

== Materials suited for vat dyeing ==
Although almost all dyeing can be done in a vat, the term vat dye is used to describe a chemical class of dyes that are applied to cellulosic fibre (i.e., cotton) using a redox reaction as described below. Because of the use of caustic soda, and the very high pH of the dye bath in the dyeing process, wool cannot be dyed using vat dyestuffs. This is because wool is soluble in caustic soda solutions. Instead, it is possible to dye wool at room temperatures with indigo (vat blue 1) and other low substantive vat dyes using soda ash as the alkali source with very little strength loss. Vat red 10, vat violet 13 and vat orange 1 can be applied in this manner as well.

== Dyeing process ==
Vat dyes characteristically require a reducing agent to solubilize them. The most common reducing agent is sodium dithionite (Na_{2}S_{2}O_{4}), which converts the dye to its "leuco" form that is soluble. Once attached to the fabric, the leuco dye is then oxidized to the insoluble state which is intensely colored. Chemical reactions such as oxidation, reduction, pH control are often necessary; even the dissolution process necessitates measuring out appropriate quantities of caustic soda and sodium hydrosulphite in order to achieve reduction. The dye is soluble only in its reduced form. The fiber is immersed repeatedly in this oxygen-free dyebath, then exposed to the air, whereupon the water-soluble reduced form changes color as oxygen turns it to the water-insoluble form. For these reasons, vat dyes are less suitable than fiber-reactive dyes for amateur use.

Indigo is an example of this dye class: it changes from yellow, in the dyebath, to green and then blue as the air hits it.

Not all vat dyeing is done with vat dyes.

=== Properties ===
The vat dyes have high color fastness, which is uncommon in other dye classes. On the other hand, vat dyes tend to have poor rubbing fastness, but this can be mitigated with special treatments to the fabric. Indigo is subject to major crocking (i.e., rubbing the dye off onto other items) unless it is applied carefully. This means that dipping many times in a weaker dye-bath is more preferred than to dip once in a stronger dye-bath.

== Light-oxidized vat dyes ==
Inkodye is a type of vat dye that uses light rather than oxygen to "fix" the dye, with a wide variety of possible effects. These dyes, which are chemically similar to vat dyes, are developed by light instead of being applied in an oxygen-free bath and being developed in the fabric by exposure to oxygen. Inkodyes are true dyes, not fabric paints. A dye itself attaches to the fabric; fabric paint includes a glue-like binder, which imparts a stiffer feeling to the fabric.

== Chemical structures ==
For example, vat blue 2 and 3 are halogenated or methylated derivatives and so are several violets. Many other vat dyes are derivatives of anthroquinones.

Blue vat dyes

Vat Blue 1

Vat Blue 4

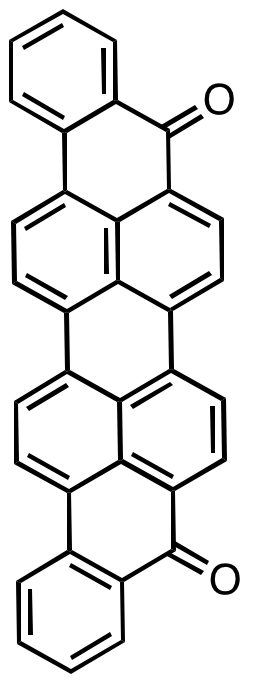
Vat Blue 20

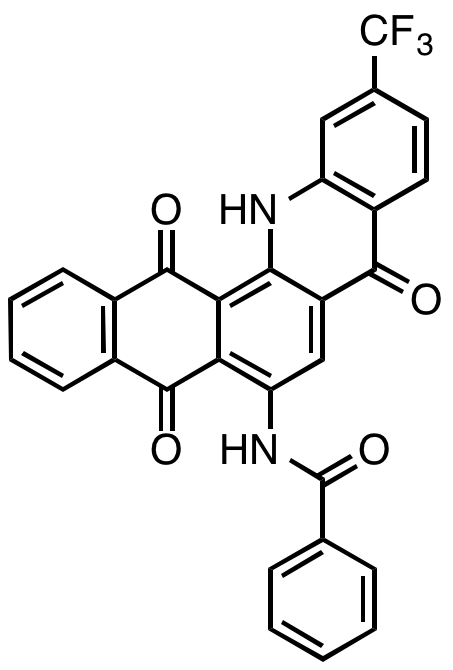
Vat Blue 21

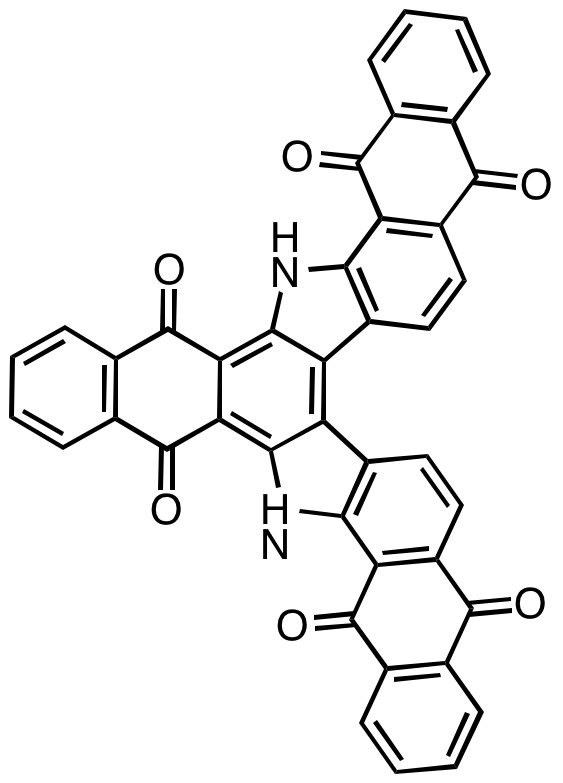
Vat Blue 25

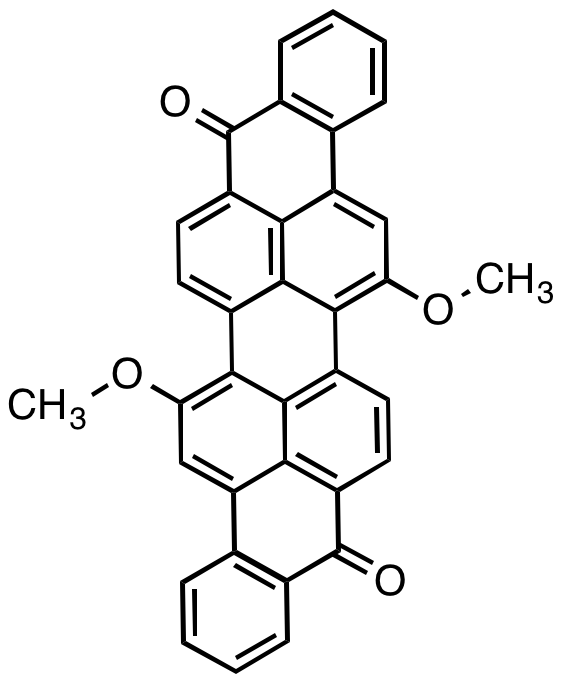
Vat Blue 26

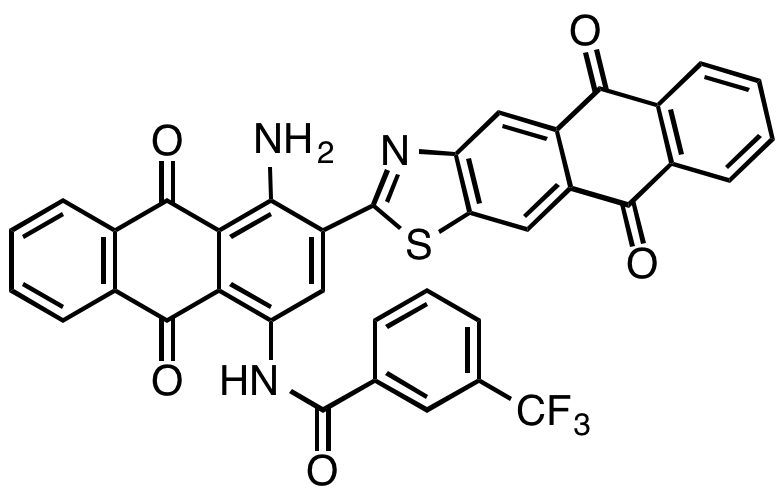
Vat Blue 30

Vat Blue 36

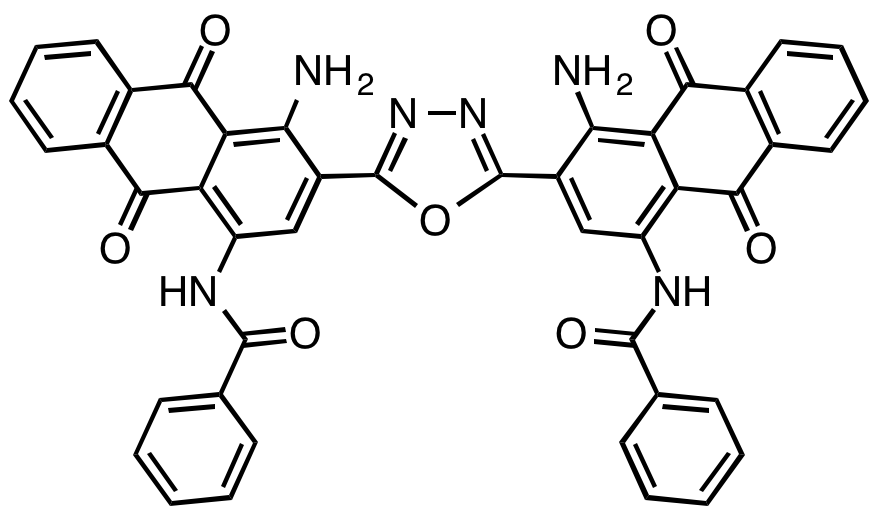
Vat Blue 64
Green vat dyes

Vat Green 1

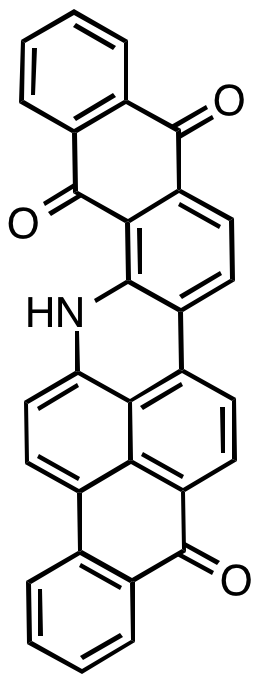
Vat Green 3

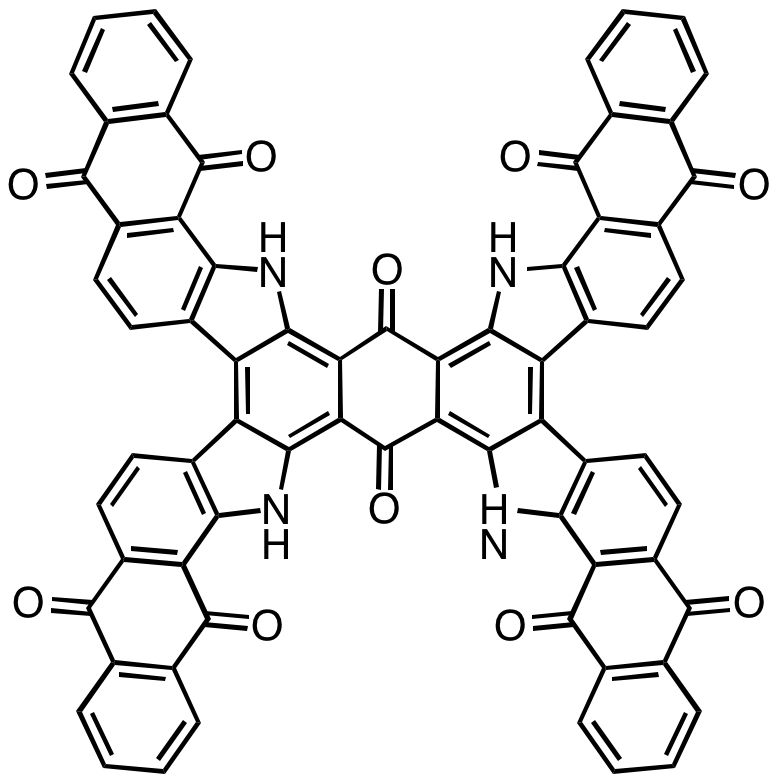
Vat Green 8

Vat Green 9

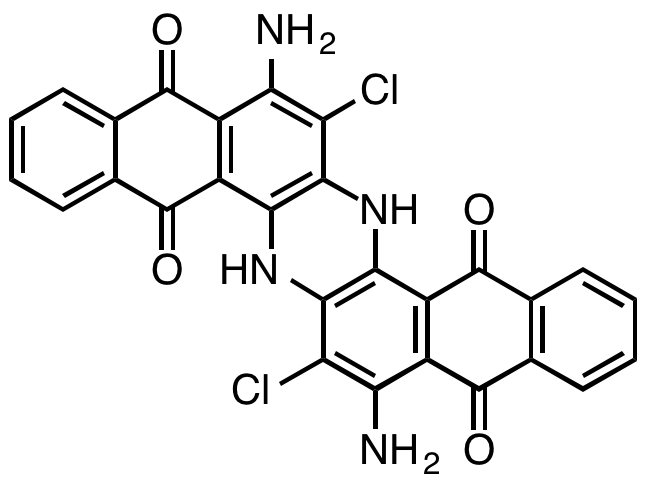
Vat Green 11

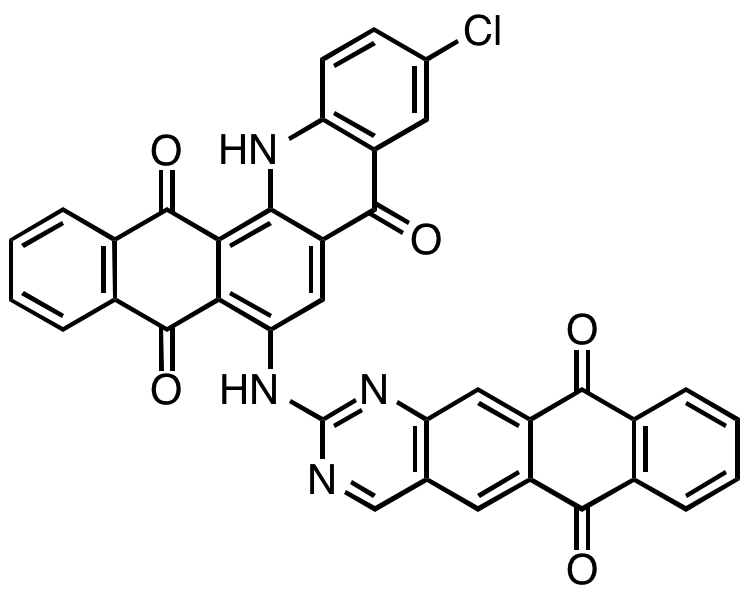
Vat Green 12
Orange vat dyes

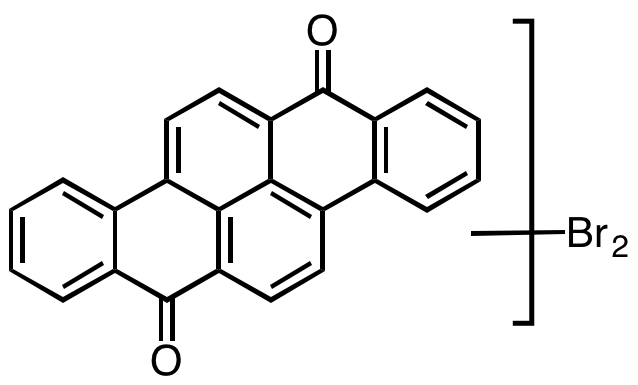
Vat Orange 1

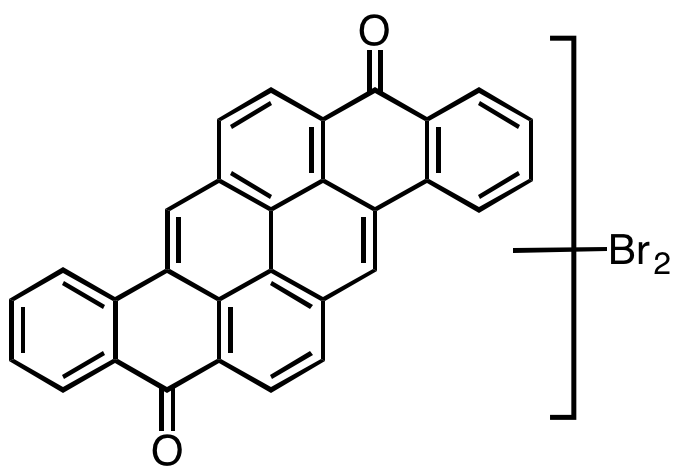
Vat Orange 2

Vat Orange 3

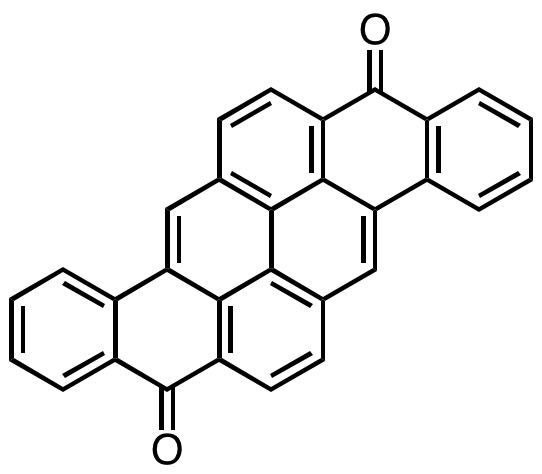
Vat Orange 9

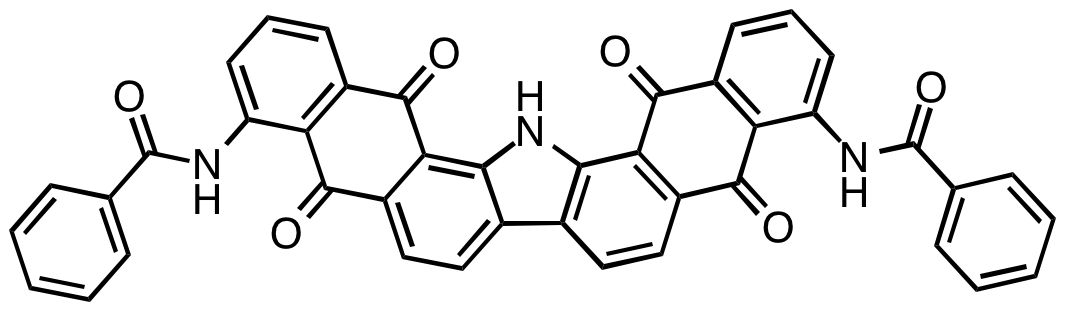
Vat Orange 15

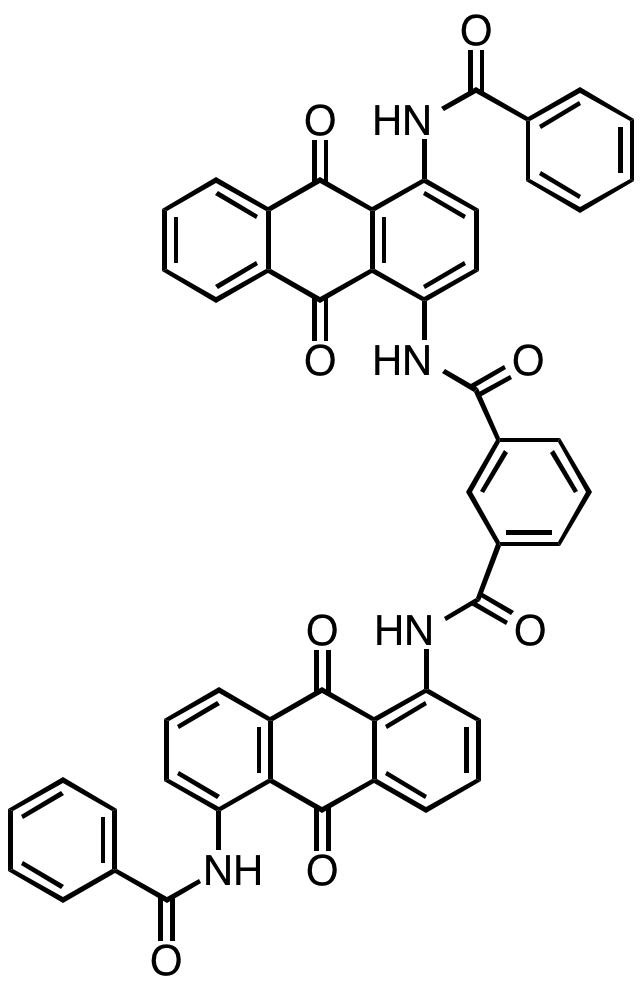
Vat Orange 17
Violet vat dyes

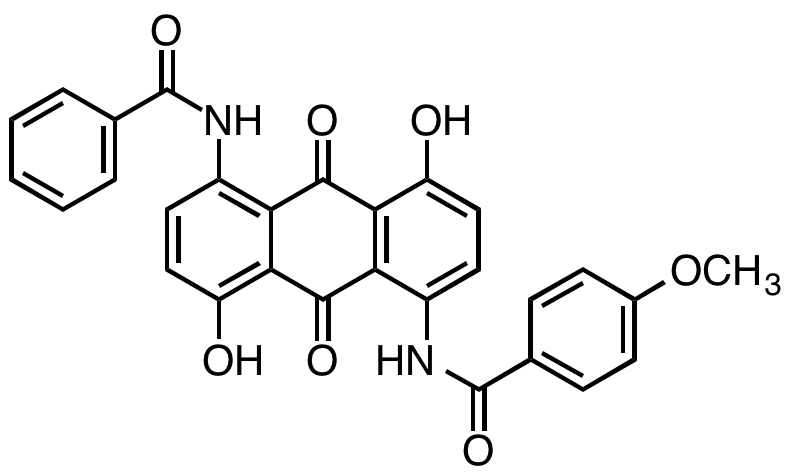
Vat violet 15

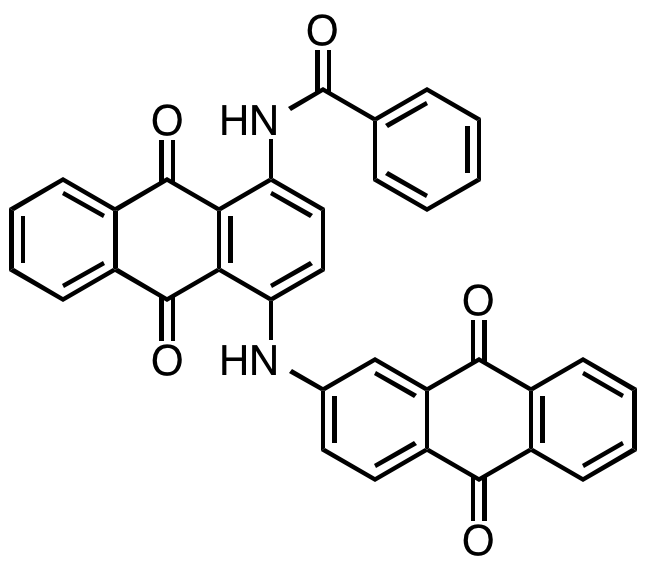
Vat Violet 18
Red vat dyes

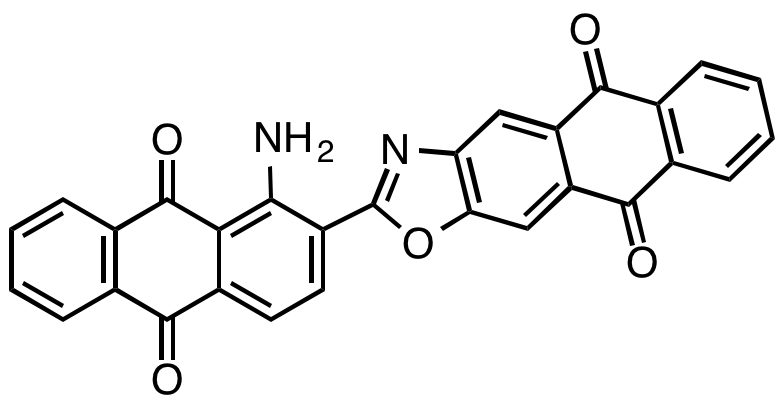
Vat Red 10

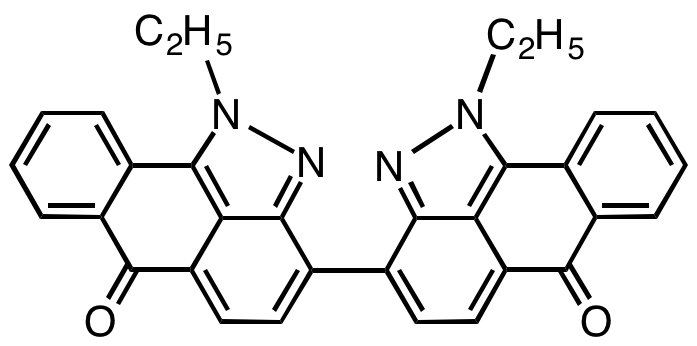
Vat Red 13

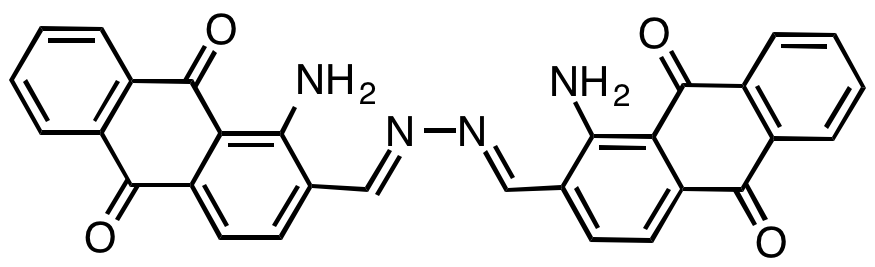
Vat Red 18

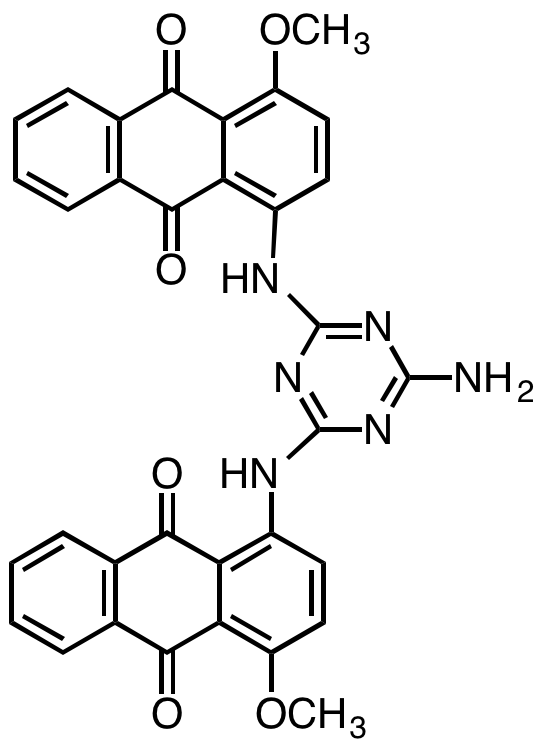
Vat Red 28

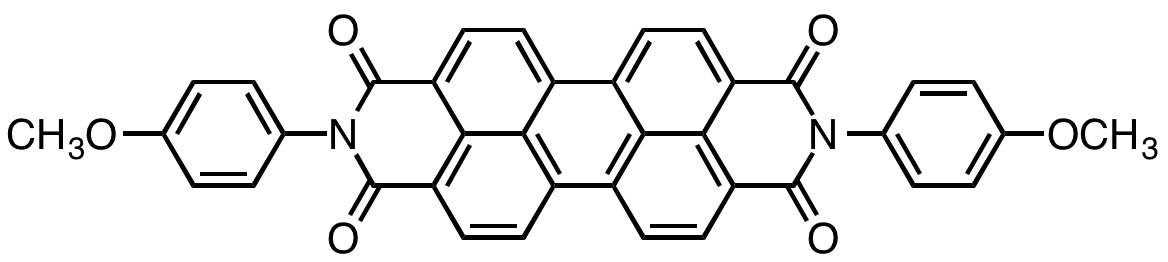
Vat Red 29
Brown vat dyes

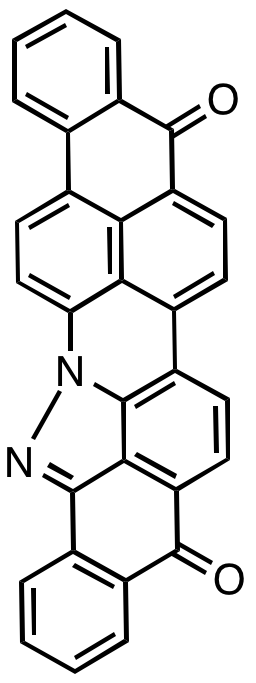
Vat Brown 1

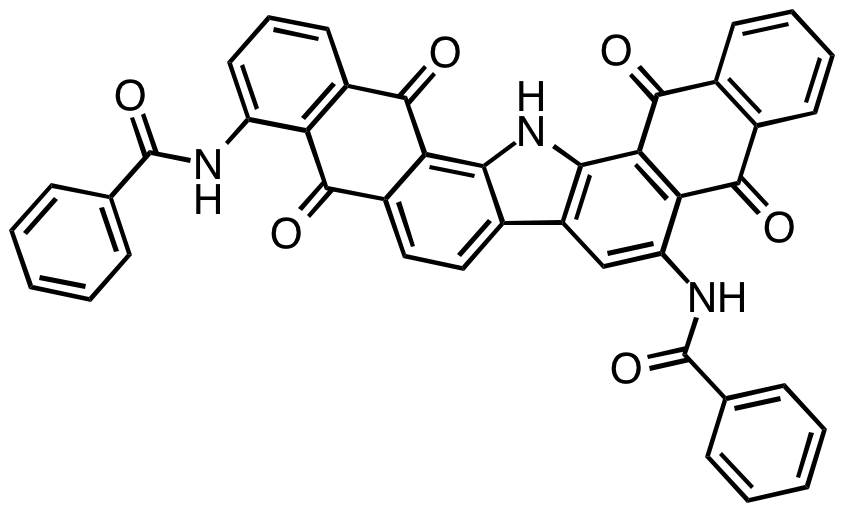
Vat Brown 3

Vat brown 45
Black vat dyes

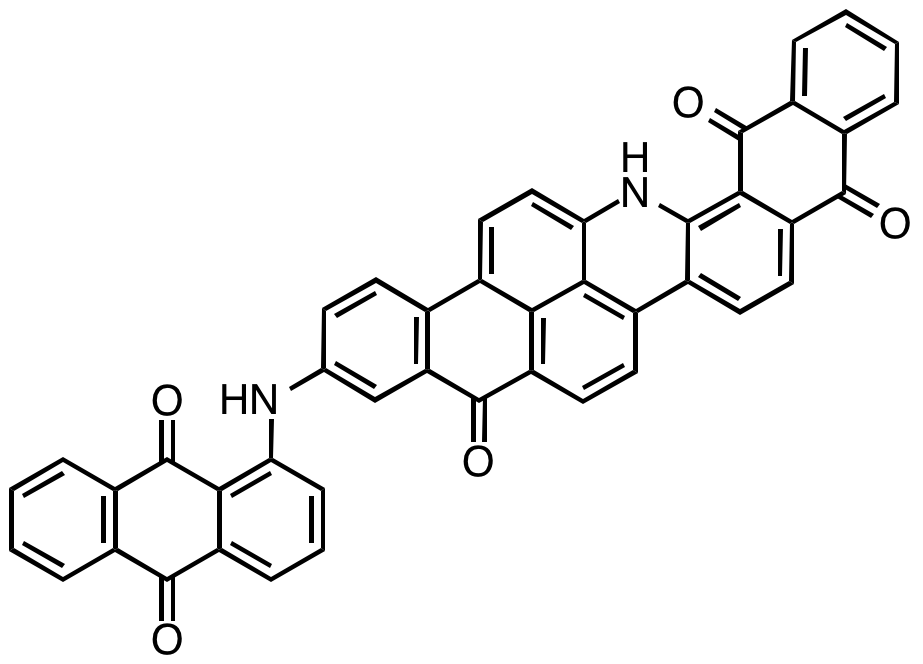
Vat Black 25

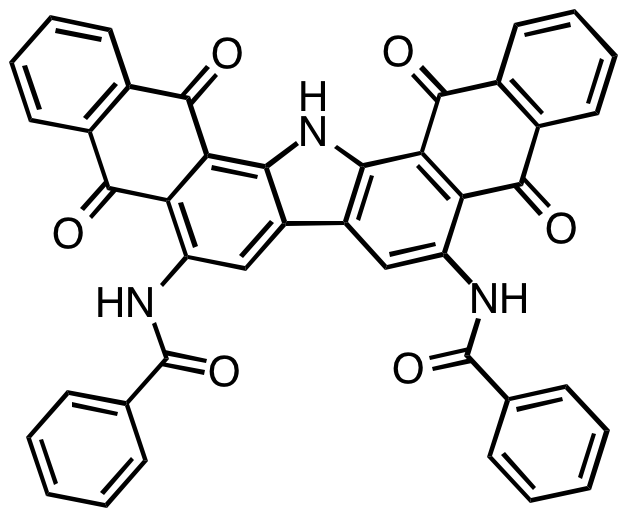
Vat Black 27

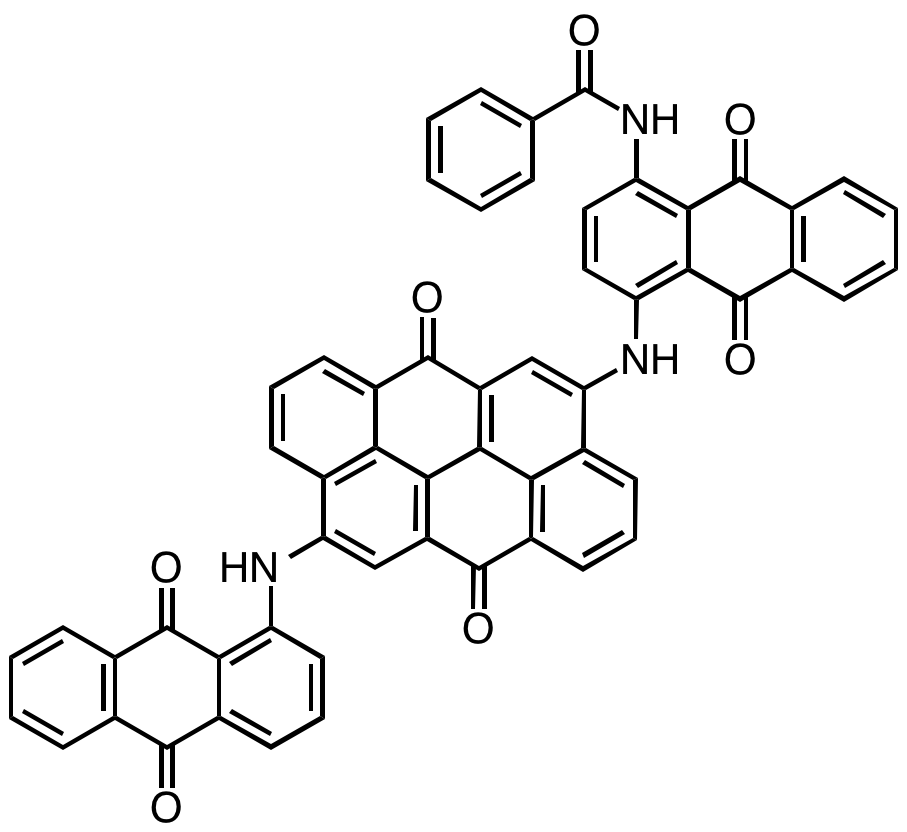
Vat Black 29
Yellow vat dyes

Vat Yellow 1

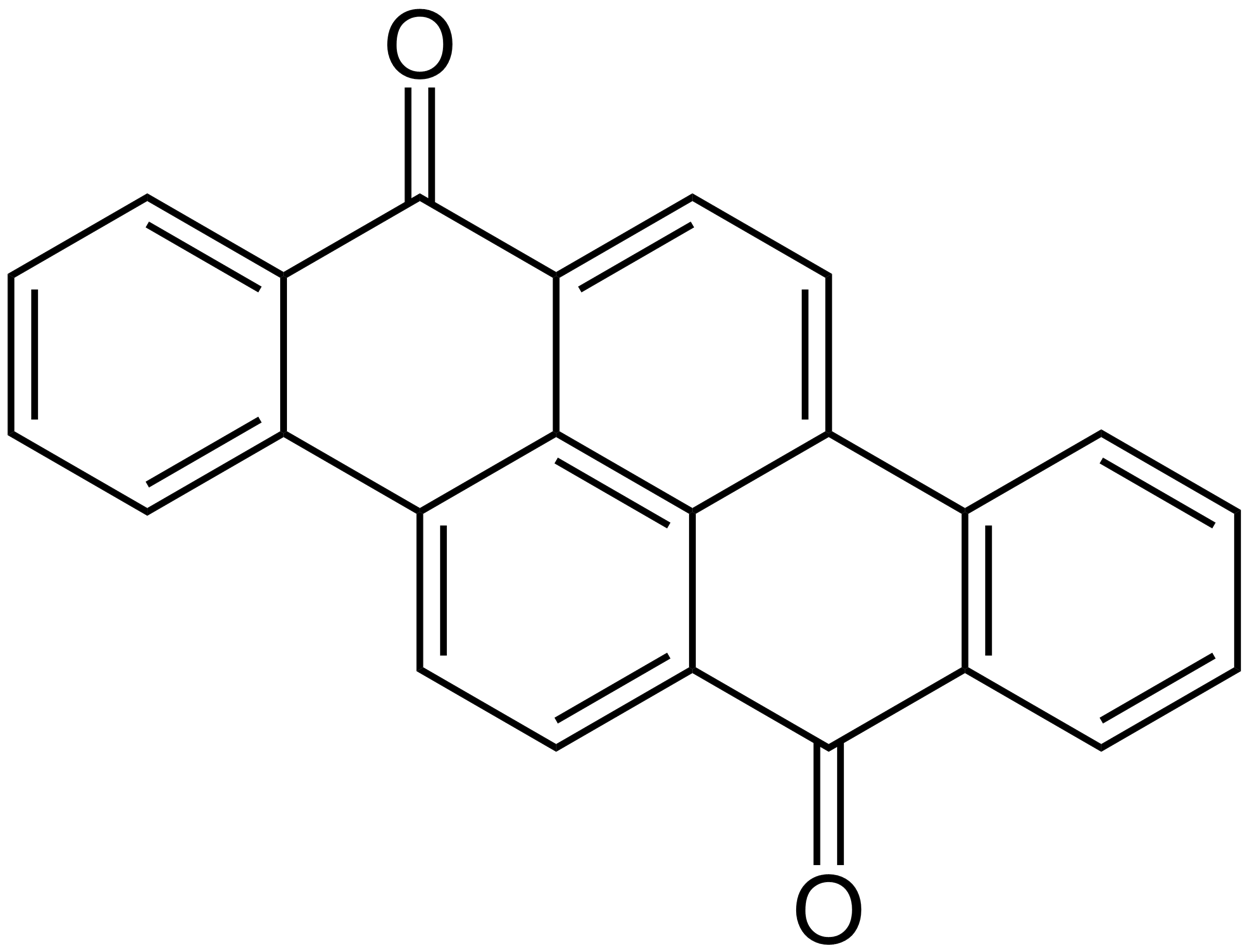
Vat Yellow 4

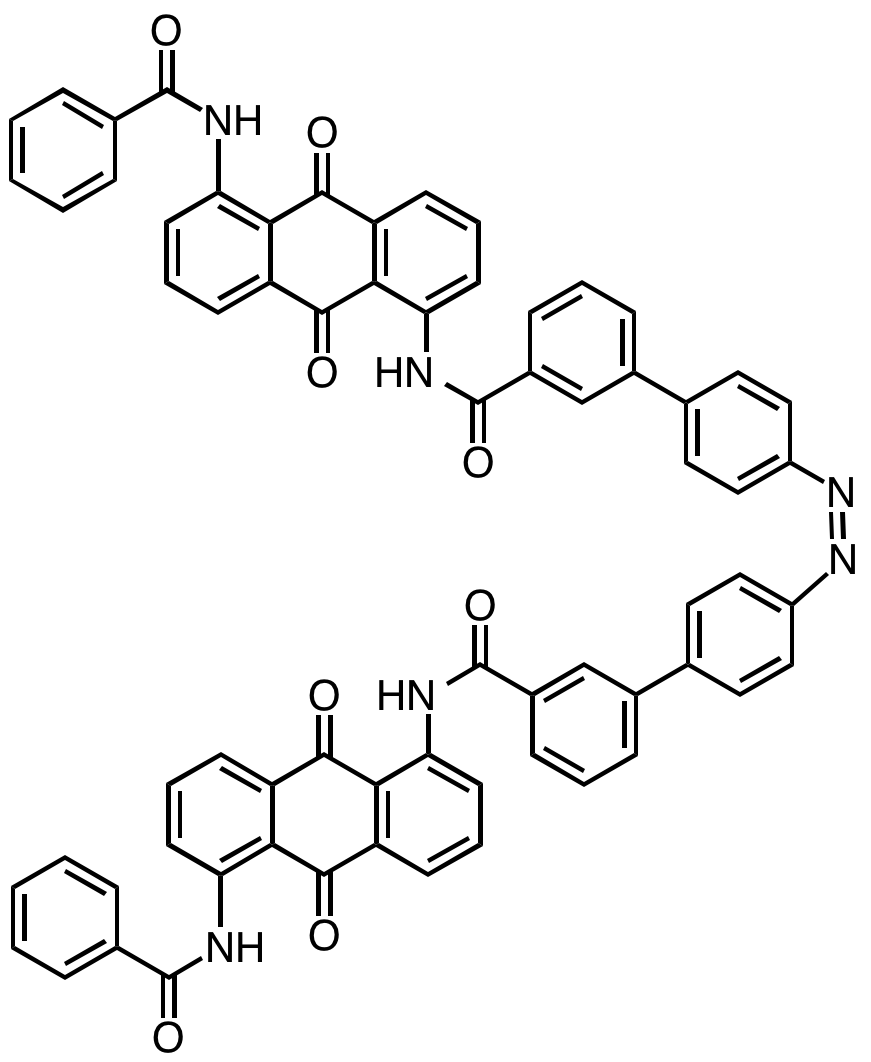
Vat Yellow 10

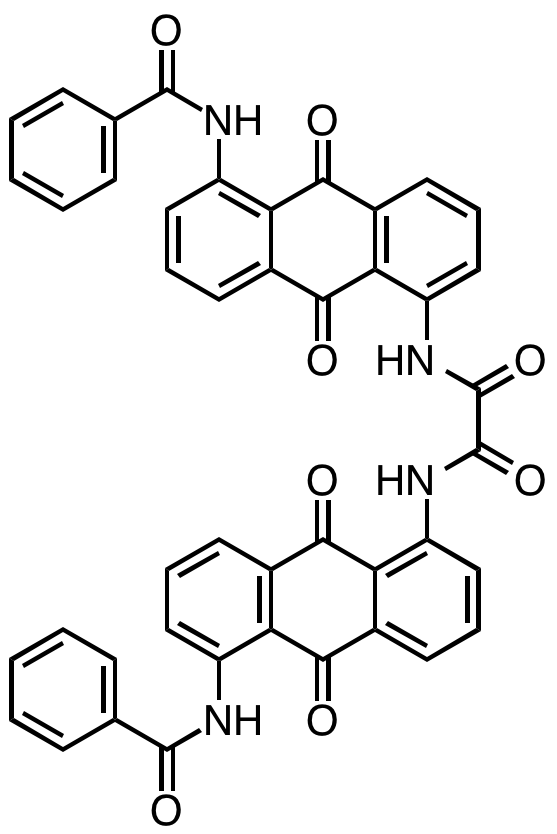
Vat Yellow 12

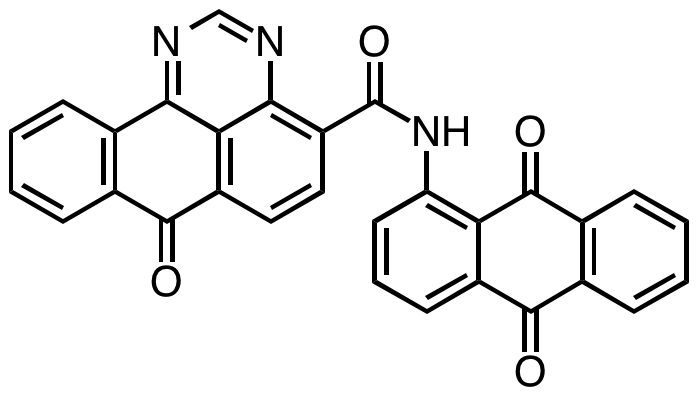
Vat Yellow 20

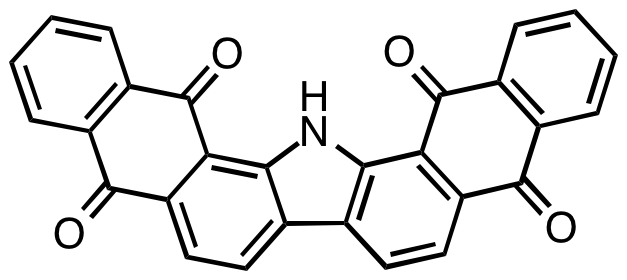
Vat Yellow 28
