= Dibromoanthanthrone =

Names
- Preferred IUPAC name 4,10-Dibromonaphtho[7,8,1,2,3-nopqr]tetraphene-6,12-dione
- Other names 4,10-Dibromoanthanthrone; Vat Dye 3 Pigment Red 168; C.I. 59300

Identifiers
CAS Number	4378-61-4
3D model (JSmol)	Interactive image
ChemSpider	70462
ECHA InfoCard	100.022.257
EC Number	224-481-3
PubChem CID	78084
UNII	VAG817W276
CompTox Dashboard (EPA)	DTXSID8044674
- InChI: InChI=1S/C22H8Br2O2/c23-15-7-14-19-17-9(15)3-1-5-11(17)21(25)13-8-16(24)10-4-2-6-12(22(14)26)18(10)20(13)19/h1-8H Key: HTENFZMEHKCNMD-UHFFFAOYSA-N
- SMILES: c1cc2c(cc3c-4c2c(c1)c(=O)c5c4c6c(cccc6c3=O)c(c5)Br)Br

Properties
Chemical formula	C_{22}H_{8}Br_{2}O_{2}
Molar mass	464.112 g·mol^{−1}
- Except where otherwise noted, data are given for materials in their standard state (at 25 °C [77 °F], 100 kPa). Infobox references

Dibromoanthanthrone is a scarlet or orange-red-hue synthetic organic colourant.

It is an anthraquinone derivative, first synthesized in 1913 as a vat dye, C.I. Vat Orange 3 (C.I. 59300), and later on also as a pigment, C.I. Pigment Red 168.
