= Perylene =

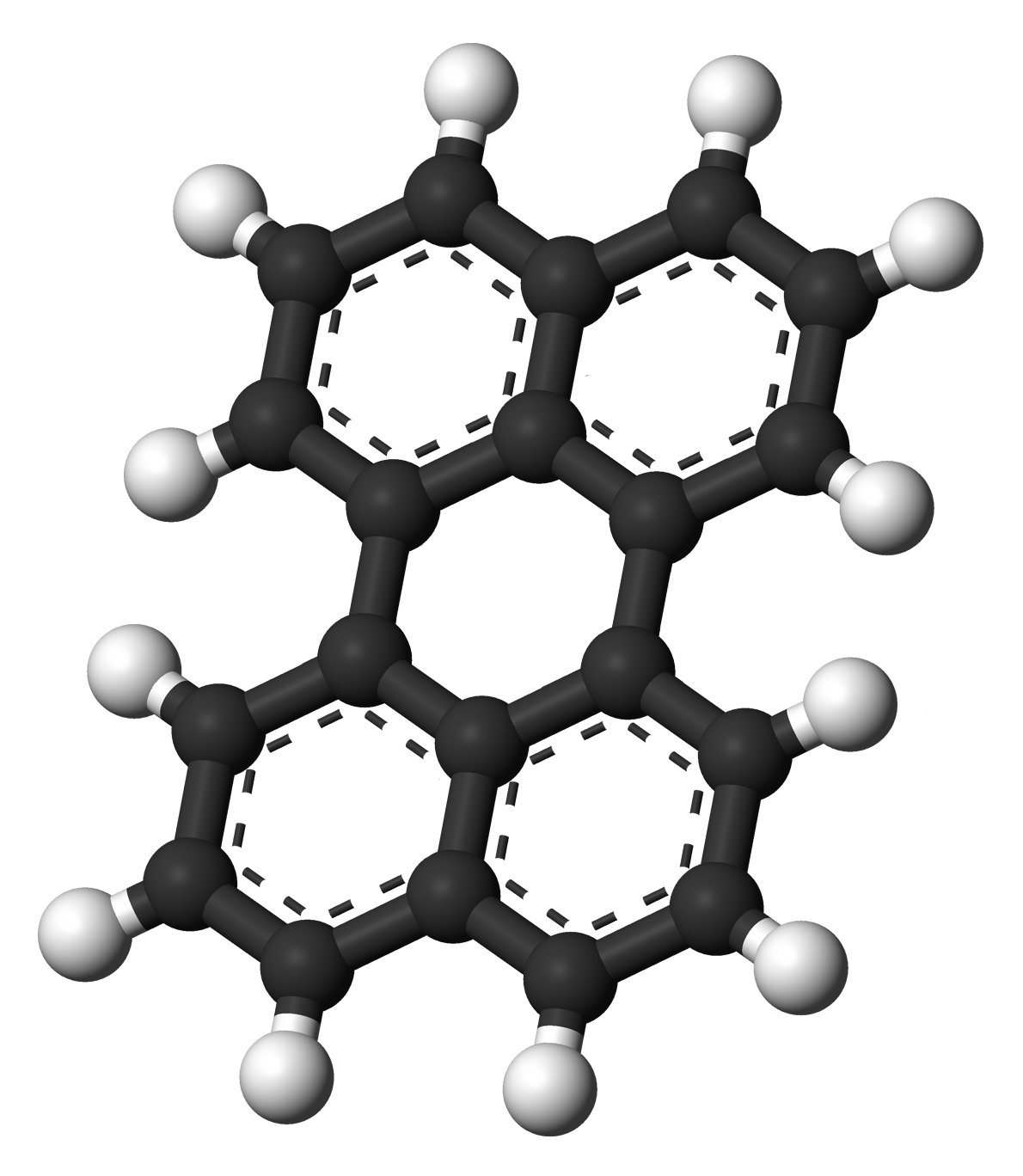

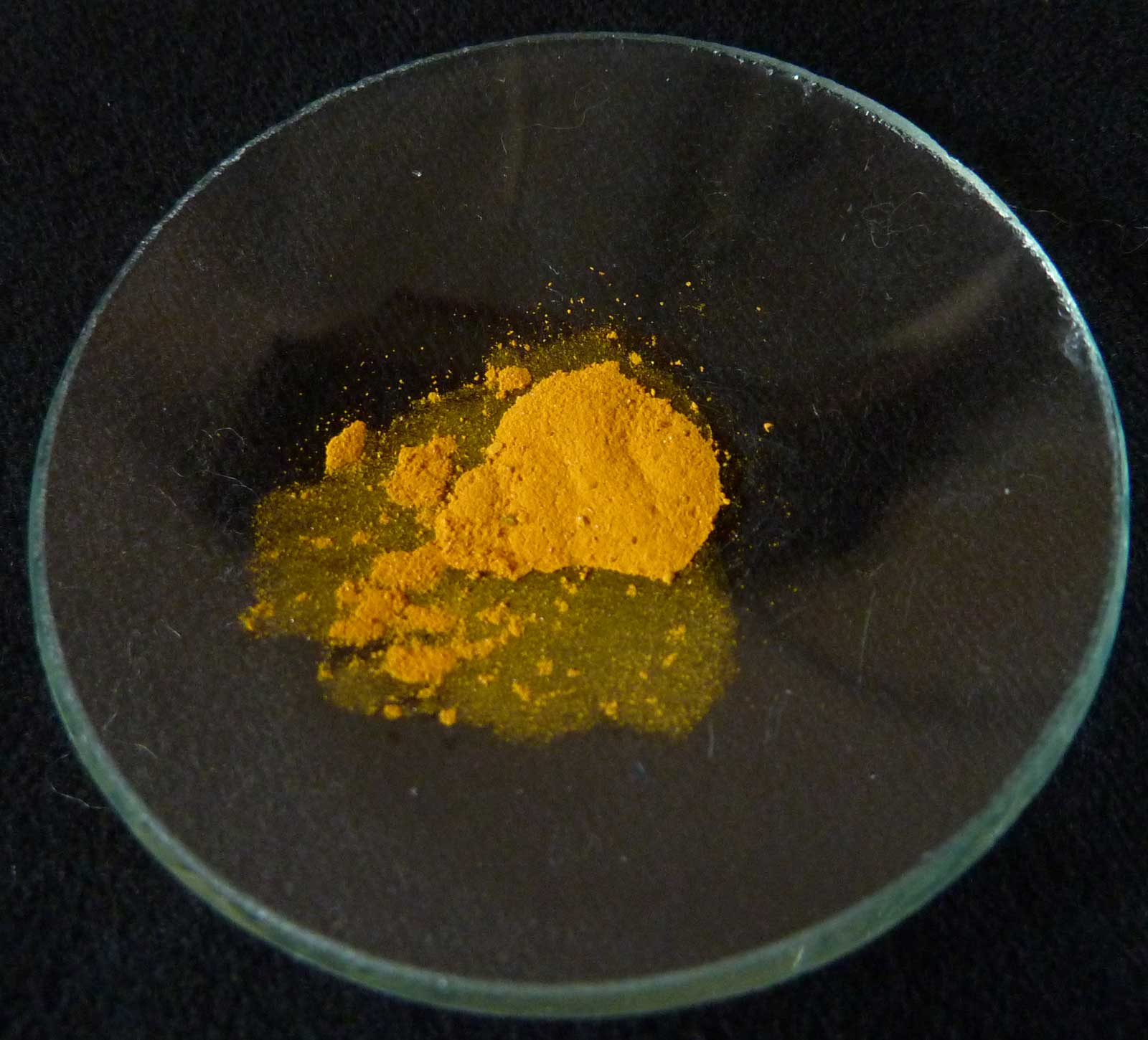

Names
- Preferred IUPAC name Perylene
- Other names peri-Dinaphthalene; Perilene; Dibenz[de,kl]anthracene

Identifiers
CAS Number	198-55-0
3D model (JSmol)	Interactive image
Beilstein Reference	1911335
ChEBI	CHEBI:29861
ChEMBL	ChEMBL4296691
ChemSpider	8788
ECHA InfoCard	100.005.365
EC Number	205-900-9
Gmelin Reference	104944
KEGG	C19497
PubChem CID	9142
RTECS number	SE3794000
UNII	5QD5427UN7
CompTox Dashboard (EPA)	DTXSID4047753
- InChI: InChI=1S/C20H12/c1-5-13-6-2-11-17-18-12-4-8-14-7-3-10-16(20(14)18)15(9-1)19(13)17/h1-12H Key: CSHWQDPOILHKBI-UHFFFAOYSA-N
- SMILES: c1ccc5cccc4c5c1c2cccc3cccc4c23

Properties
Chemical formula	C_{20}H_{12}
Molar mass	252.316 g·mol^{−1}
Appearance	Brown solid
Melting point	276 to 279 °C (529 to 534 °F; 549 to 552 K)
Magnetic susceptibility (χ)	−166.8·10^{−6} cm^{3}/mol
- Except where otherwise noted, data are given for materials in their standard state (at 25 °C [77 °F], 100 kPa). verify (what is ?) Infobox references

Perylene or perilene is a polycyclic aromatic hydrocarbon with the chemical formula C_{20}H_{12}, occurring as a brown solid. It or its derivatives may be carcinogenic, and it is considered to be a hazardous pollutant. In cell membrane cytochemistry, perylene is used as a fluorescent lipid probe. It is the parent compound of a class of rylene dyes.

== Reactions ==
Like other polycyclic aromatic compounds, perylene is reduced by alkali metals to give a deeply colored radical anion and a dianion. The diglyme solvates of these salts have been characterized by X-ray crystallography.

== Emission ==
Perylene displays blue fluorescence. It is used as a blue-emitting dopant material in OLEDs, either pure or substituted. Perylene can also be used as an organic photoconductor. It has an absorption maximum at 434 nm, and as with all polycyclic aromatic compounds, low water solubility (1.2×10^{−5} mmol/L). Perylene has a molar absorptivity of 38,500 M^{−1} cm^{−1} at 435.7 nm.

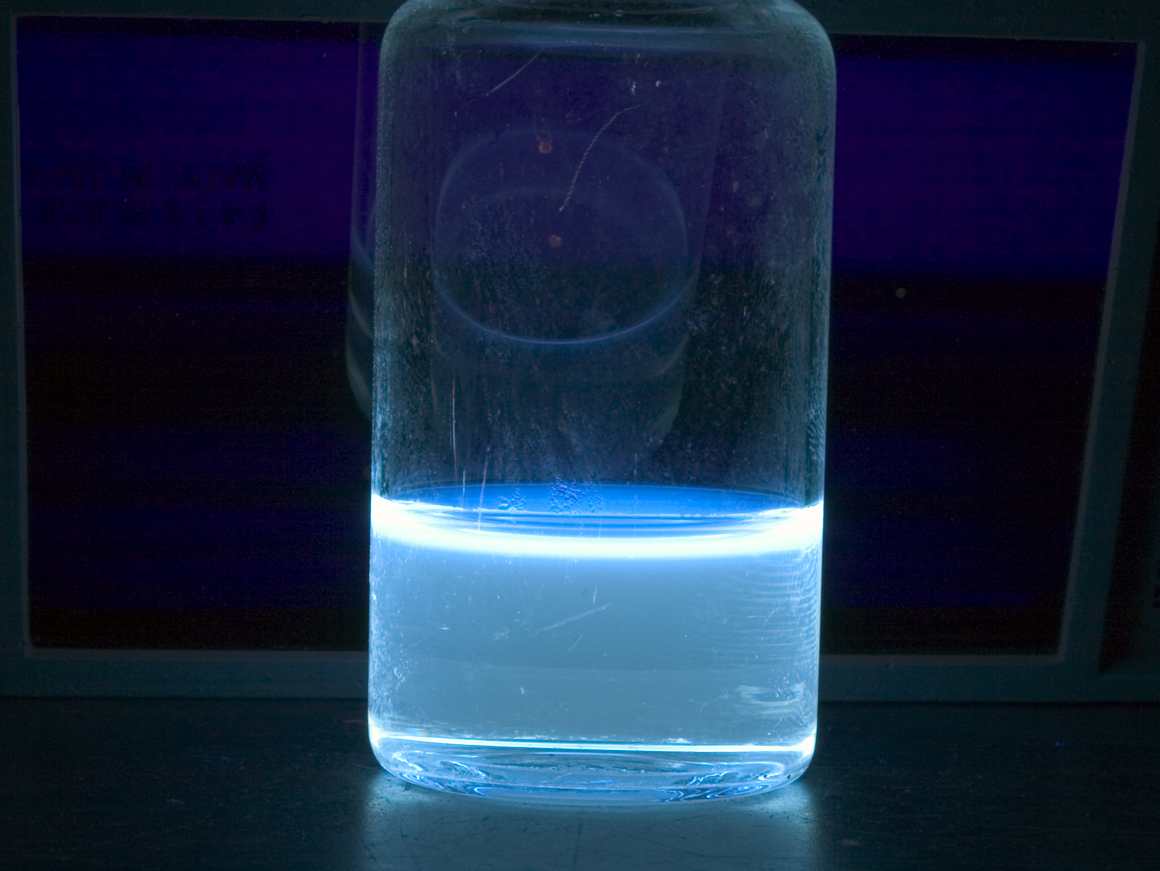
Perylene dissolved in dichloromethane exposed to Long Wave UV radiation

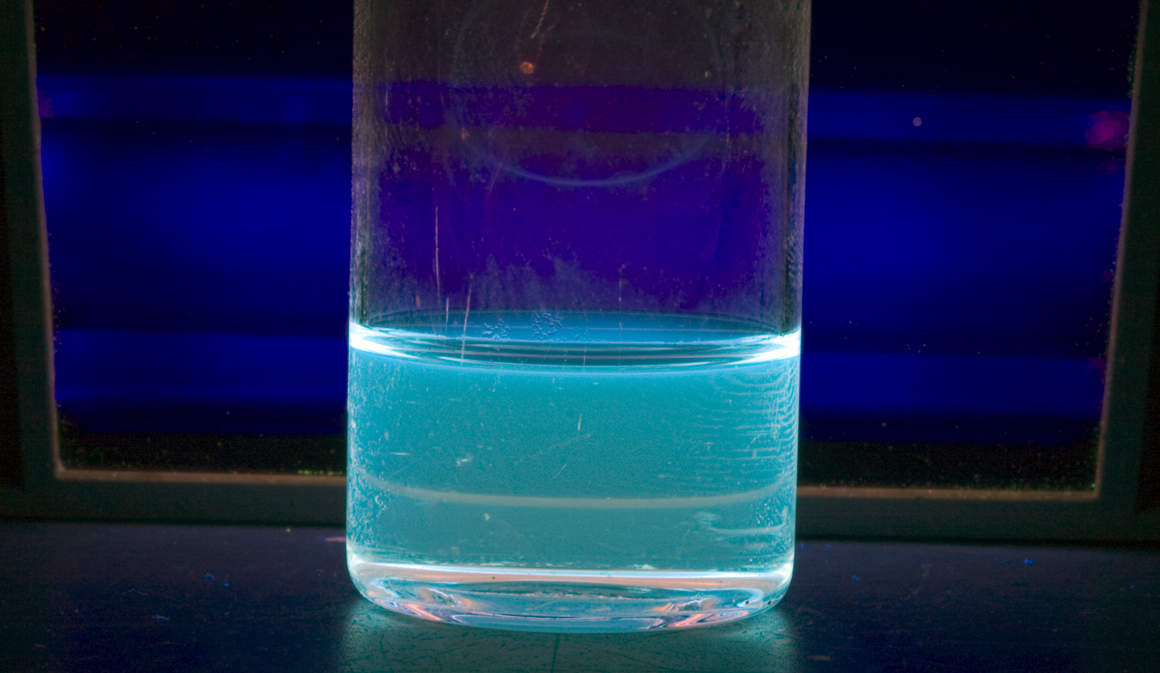
Perylene dissolved in dichloromethane exposed to Short Wave UV radiation

== Structure ==
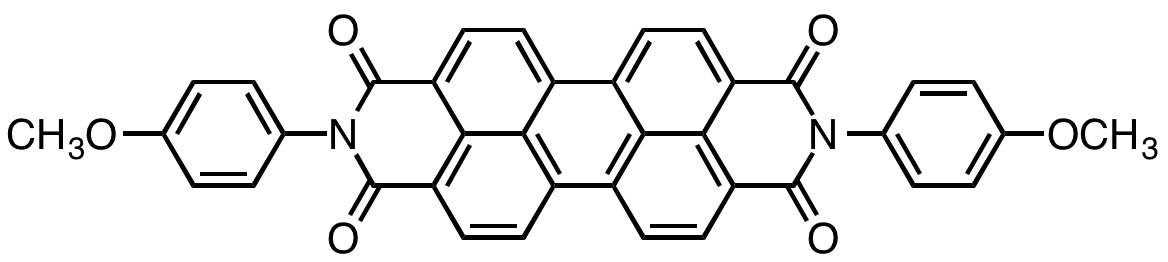
Vat Red 29 typical example of a structure with a perylene core

The perylene molecule consists of two naphthalene molecules connected by a carbon-carbon bond at the 1 and 8 positions on both molecules. All of the carbon atoms in perylene are sp^{2} hybridized. The structure of perylene has been extensively studied by X-ray crystallography.

== Biology ==
Naturally occurring perylene quinones have been identified in lichens Laurera sanguinaria and Graphis haematites. See also blue amber.
