= Benzo(c)fluorene =

Chemical compound

Benzo[c]fluorene
- 7H-Benzo[c]fluorene

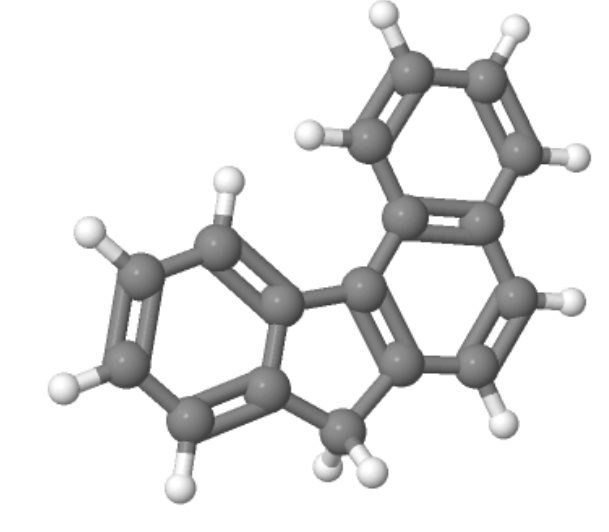

Names
- Preferred IUPAC name 7H-Benzo[c]fluorene
- Other names Tetracyclo[8.7.0.0^{2,7}.0^{12,17}]heptadeca-1,3,5,7,9,12,14,16-octaene

Identifiers
CAS Number	205-12-9
3D model (JSmol)	Interactive image
ChEBI	CHEBI:82403
ChemSpider	8796
ECHA InfoCard	100.005.372
EC Number	205-908-2
KEGG	C19344
PubChem CID	9150
UNII	PX3702DW3A
CompTox Dashboard (EPA)	DTXSID30874039
- InChI: InChI=1S/C17H12/c1-3-7-15-12(5-1)9-10-14-11-13-6-2-4-8-16(13)17(14)15/h1-10H,11H2 Key: FRIJWEQBTIZQMD-UHFFFAOYSA-N
- SMILES: C1C2=C(C3=CC=CC=C31)C4=CC=CC=C4C=C2

Properties
Chemical formula	C_{17}H_{12}
Molar mass	216.283 g·mol^{−1}
Density	1.185 g/cm^{3}
Melting point	125–127 °C (257–261 °F; 398–400 K) predicted
Boiling point	398 °C (748 °F; 671 K) predicted

Hazards
- GHS labelling
Pictograms	(GHS07: Exclamation mark)
Signal word	Warning
Hazard statements	H410
Precautionary statements	P273, P391, P501
- Except where otherwise noted, data are given for materials in their standard state (at 25 °C [77 °F], 100 kPa). verify (what is ?) Infobox references

Benzo[c]fluorene is a polycyclic aromatic hydrocarbon (PAH) with mutagenic activity. It is a component of coal tar, cigarette smoke and smog and thought to be a major contributor to its carcinogenic properties. The mutagenicity of benzo[c]fluorene is mainly attributed to formation of metabolites that are reactive and capable of forming DNA adducts. According to the KEGG it is a group 3 carcinogen (not classifiable as to its carcinogenicity to humans). Other names for benzo[c]fluorene are 7H-benzo[c]fluorene, 3,4-benzofluorene, and NSC 89264.

== Structure and reactivity ==
The structure of benzo[c]fluorene is depicted in the infobox on the right. It is an aromatic fluorene-derived molecule with an extra benzene ring. This benzene ring is attached to carbon 3 and 4 of the fluorene-derived molecule. The 3D structure of benzo[c]fluorene is depicted in the infobox on the right as well. It is mostly flat, because it consists of 3 aromatic rings. Only the 2 hydrogen atoms on the 5 ring are oriented into the 3D plane.

== Synthesis ==
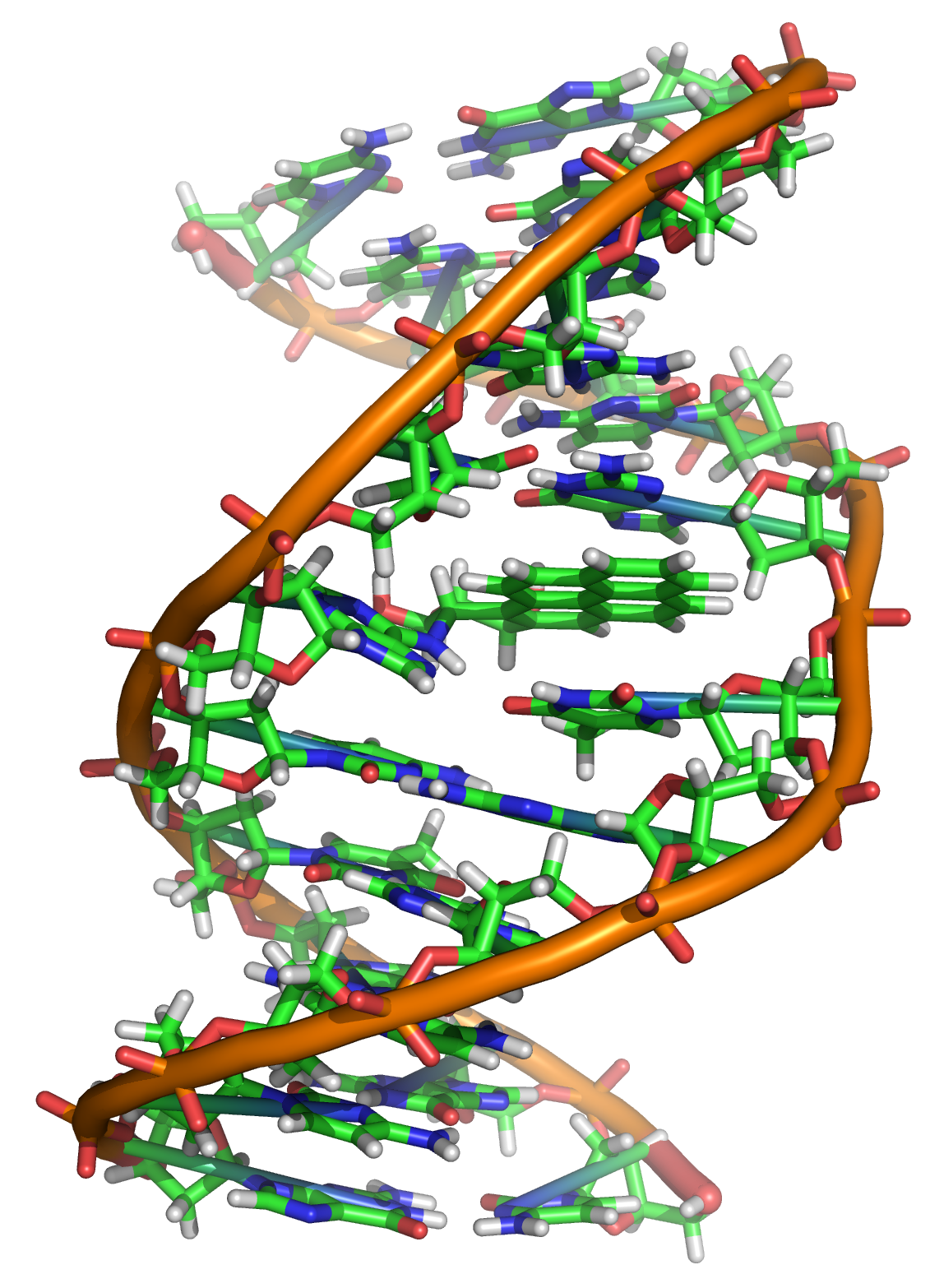
An example of a DNA adduct (at center), in this case the metabolite of benzo[a]pyrene, another PAH.

Benzo[c]fluorene occurs naturally in tar, but can also be manually synthesized in a four step process, which is depicted in the picture below. The starting product is 1-indanone (1). This is brominated in a substitution reaction to 3-bromoindanone (2) using the reagent N-bromosuccinimide. This substance is dehydrobrominated to 2H-inden-1-one (3) using the reagent triethylamine. Benzo[c]fluorenone-9 (4) is generated by self-condensation of 2H-inden-1-one, when heated. The final step is reduction of this compound with hydrazine hydrate, generating benzo[c]fluorene (5).

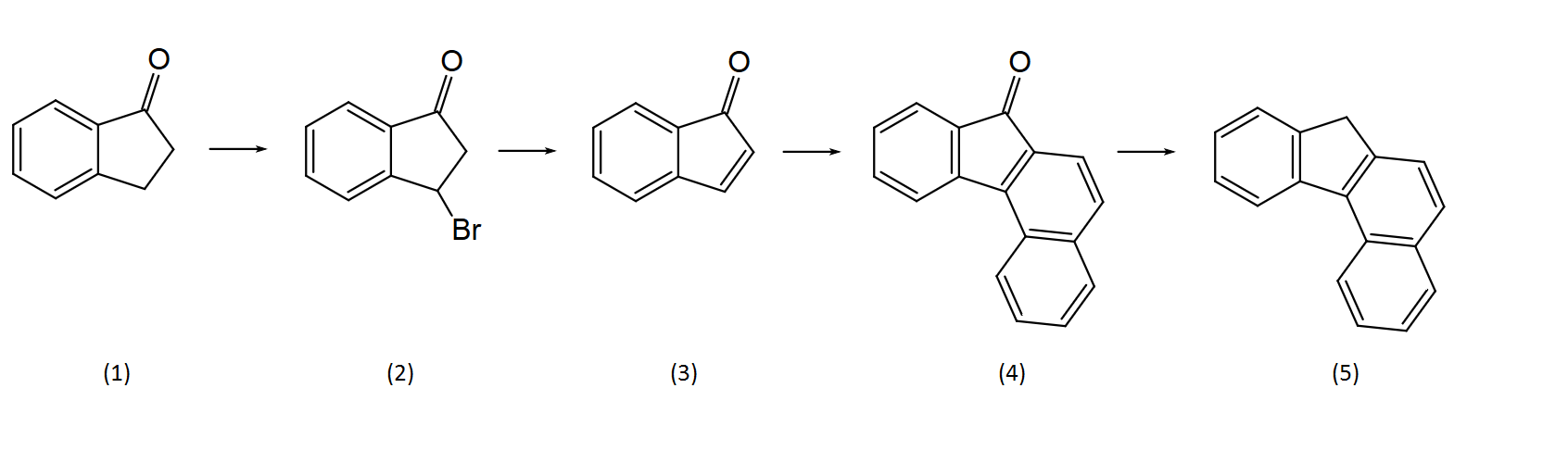
Synthesis of benzo[c]fluorene

== Metabolism ==
In general PAH carcinogenesis involves activation by the enzyme P-450 to diol epoxide metabolites with an epoxide ring in the bay or fjord region. These diol epoxide metabolites are reactive and capable of forming DNA adducts (see the adjacent image). While benzo[c]fluorene does not have a bay or fjord region it does undergo a similar transformation with a pseudo-bay region that reacts instead. The type of cytochrome P 450 involved is thought to be CYP1A1.

The biotransformation is depicted in the image below. First benzo[c]fluorene (1) is transformed into trans-3,4-dihydrodiol (2). This substance is transformed by CYP1A1 into the highly carcinogenic metabolites anti-diolepoxide (3) and syn-diolepoxide (4).

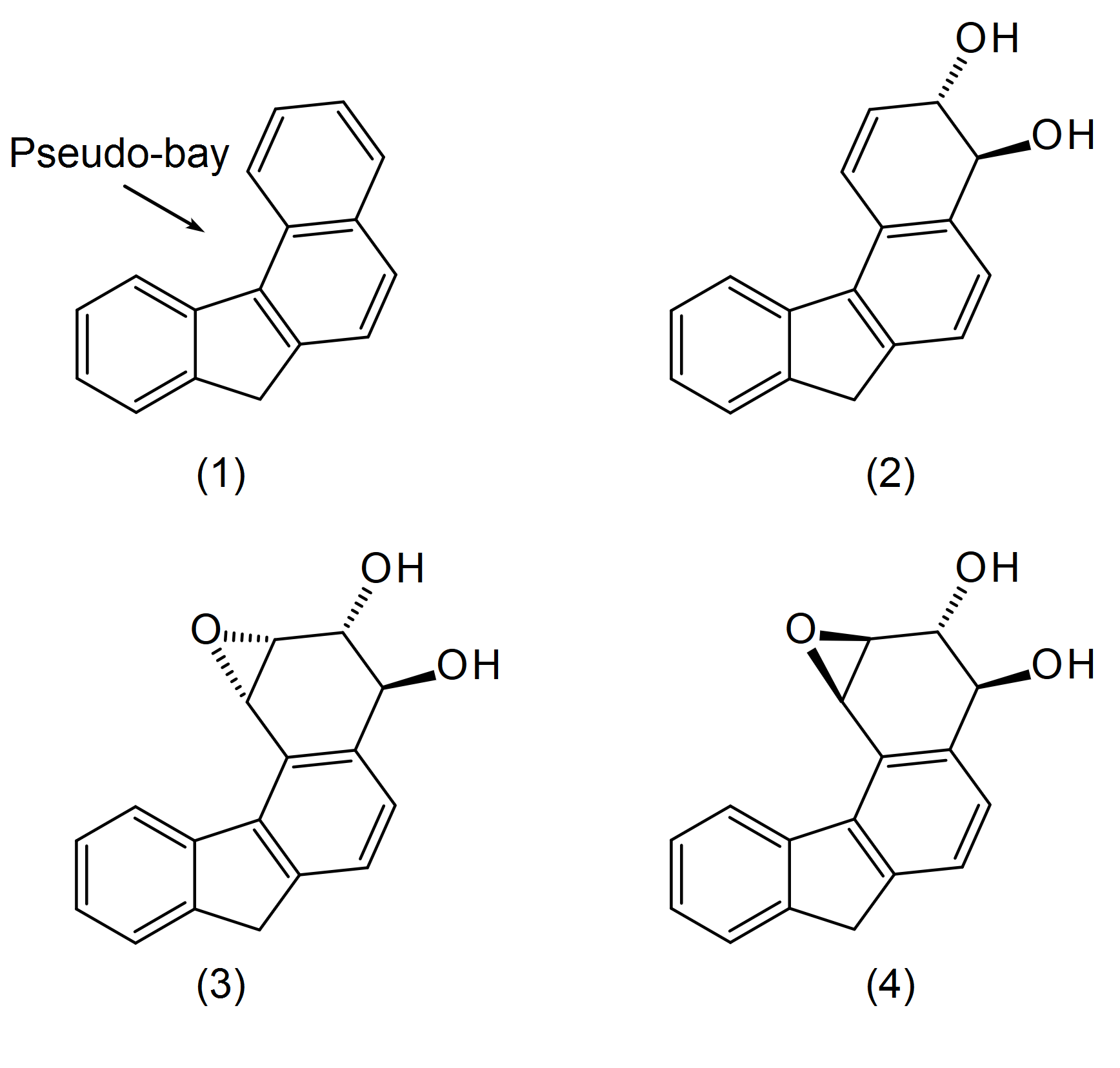
Metabolism of benzo[c]fluorene

=== ADME of benzo[c]fluorene and PAHs in general ===
==== Absorption ====
Benzo[c]fluorene and PAHs in general are mostly absorbed via ingestion, inhalation, and dermal contact. Also, depending on the vehicle (transport medium) in which the PAHs are located, the percentages of absorption can differ. Ingestion of benzo[c]fluorene makes it a very potent lung tumorigen In particular, benzo[c]fluorene is better absorbed in the lungs.

==== Distribution ====
Once it is absorbed, benzo[c]fluorene enters the lymph, circulates in the blood and is metabolized. The distribution of PAHs depends on their lipophilicity and probably benzo[c]fluorene can easily cross the cell membrane, because of this lipophilicity. This has been proven for similar substances like fluorene and fluoranthene, but has yet to be investigated for benzo[c]fluorene.

==== Metabolism and excretion ====
Benzo[c]fluorene is mainly metabolized by the CYP enzymes in the liver. There is also evidence that a larger number of metabolites are formed in the lungs, which might explain why benzo[c]fluorene is such a potent lung tumorigen. It is possible that benzo[c]fluorene may have a unique (and still unknown) mechanism of activation or transportation, which explains why the lungs are targeted. The initial steps of the metabolism, the phase I biotransformation, are described above.

For many PAHs it has been proven that they are conjugated, in phase II, with either glucuronide, sulfate or glutathione. More research on this topic is necessary for benzo[c]fluorene. Glucuronide and sulfate conjugates of PAH metabolites are generally excreted in the bile and urine. Glutathione conjugates are further metabolized to mercapturic acids in the kidney and are excreted in the urine. The hydroxylated metabolites of the PAHs are excreted in human urine both as free hydroxylated metabolites and as hydroxylated metabolites conjugated to glucuronic acid and sulfate.

== Mechanism of action ==
The carcinogenic metabolites of benzo[c]fluorene bind to DNA which involves the opening of the epoxide ring in benzo[c]fluorene anti- and syn-diolepoxide. The benzo[c]fluorene metabolites bind in a yet unknown fashion to the DNA.

When a DNA adduct forms at a site critical to the regulation of cell differentiation or growth it can cause cancer. If an aberration in the DNA is not well repaired by the NER, a mutation will occur during cell replication. In addition, it is known that the cells affected most appear to be those with rapid replication, such as bone marrow, skin, and lung tissue, whereas tissues with slower turnover rate like the liver are less susceptible.

Exposure to benzo[c]fluorene in vivo leads to the induction of mainly lung tumors where it acts as a DNA adductor. Lung tumors arise after topical application in mice with coal tar, but also when it is ingested. Next to its involvement in lung tumors, benzo[c]fluorene and its metabolites are expected to be involved in the formation of different tumors. The formation of DNA adducts in human breast tumors, hepatoma and colon adenocarcinoma by these metabolites has been shown in vitro. These adducts and the ones that were observed in lung tumors of mice were similar, which strengthens the hypothesis that human cells are capable of forming the mutagenic metabolites.

== Environmental exposure ==
Benzo[c]fluorene belongs to a group of compounds called polycyclic aromatic hydrocarbons (PAHs). PAHs and their derivatives are ubiquitous in the environment and they are produced in several industrial and combustion processes.

Workers in industries or trades using or producing coal, crude oil or coal products are at highest risk for PAH exposure. In general, the PAHs are formed during these industrial processes by incomplete combustion or pyrolysis of organic matter. The higher the temperature the more PAHs are formed.

Some of these PAHs, such as benzo[c]fluorene, are carcinogens and mutagens and act as possible endocrine disruptors. To estimate the health effects that arise from exposure to PAHs and benzo[c]fluorene it is necessary to determine the concentration of these compounds in the atmosphere. This was done in a study by Morisaki et al. 2016. They compared the concentrations of different PAHs including benzo[c]fluorene in Beijing and Kanazawa in winter and summer.

Concentrations of benzo[c]fluorene and some other PAHs in air in Beijing and Kanazawa and the relative potency of these PAHs.
	RPF	Beijing				Kanazawa			
	RPF	winter		summer		winter		summer	
	RPF	pg/m^{3}	BaPeq	pg/m^{3}	BaPeq	pg/m^{3}	BaPeq	pg/m^{3}	BaPeq
Fluorene	0.08	46000±28000	3.7	550±140	0.04	160±72	0.013	57±22	0.005
B[a]P	1	27000±20000	26.9	960±320	0.96	93±49	0.093	99±18	0.099
B[c]F	20	11000±6100	215.5	40±12	0.79	13±5	0.254	2.7±0.52	0.053
...									
Total		360000±23000	292.8	8500±2100	3.05	1600±710	0.58	890±170	0.29

The researchers corrected for the relative mutagenicity of compounds compared to benzo[a]pyrene. The results of this are presented as BaPeq, which equals the concentration of the compound, times the potency of the compound compared to benzo[a]pyrene (RPF). Although the concentrations measured of benzo[c]fluorene are quite low, when corrected for mutagenicity, benzo[c]fluorene is the most important PAH of those that were measured in terms of possible health risks.

== Safety ==
=== Carcinogenity ===
In one study, the Ames test was performed on benzo[c]fluorene. Two different strains were used, TA100 and TA98. One group of each strain had a rat liver fraction and one group did not. The difference between the TA100 and the TA98 strain is that the TA98 strain has a frameshift mutation, and the TA100 has a base substitution mutation. When the amount of benzo[c]fluorene is increased in TA 100 yeast strain, the amount of revertants per plate does not increase. Only in the TA98 strain plate, which contained a fraction of a rat liver, a higher dose of benzo[c]fluorene seems to correspond with a larger amount of revertants. This indicates that benzo[c]fluorene is metabolized by enzymes in the rat liver into more potent mutagenic compounds. These compounds only affected the TA98 strain. This indicates that the adducts formed by benzo[c]fluorene metabolites cause frameshift mutations, and not point mutations.

Dose response curve of benzo[c]fluorene was applied to the skin of mice. Data derived from	Ames test of benzo[c]fluorene. Data derived from

=== Effects on animals ===
In one animal study, mice that were fed coal tar developed lung tumors. DNA adducts in these mice were analyzed and could be traced back to benzo[c]fluorene. This and another similar study suggest a contribution of benzo[c]fluorene to the carcinogenic potency of coal tar when administered orally.

Another study found that benzo[c]fluorene is also carcinogenic in mice when applied topically, inducing lung and skin cancer. Of the results of this study a dose-response curve has been made, see the image above.

This figure shows the DNA adduct level after a certain dose of benzo[c]fluorene was applied to the skin of mice. This level is similar in the lungs and in the skin implying that benzo[c]fluorene is a systemic mutagen.

The effects of exposure to benzo[c]fluorene were also researched on rats. In one of these studies the liver was established to be the main place of disposition of benzo[c]fluorene after a single oral dose regardless of the size of the dose. It was found that 55-69% of the labelled benzo[c]fluorene was excreted via the feces while 8–10% was found to be eliminated via urine. While the benzo[c]fluorene found in the feces was not biotransformed, the urine samples mainly showed polar metabolites of benzo[c]fluorene.

== See also ==
- Benzo[a]fluorene
