= Mycobacterium pyrenivorans =

Scientific classification
- Domain: Bacteria
- Kingdom: Bacillati
- Phylum: Actinomycetota
- Class: Actinomycetia
- Order: Mycobacteriales
- Family: Mycobacteriaceae
- Genus: Mycobacterium
- Species: M. pyrenivorans

Binomial name
- Mycobacterium pyrenivorans Derz et al. 2004, DSM 44605

Species of bacterium

Mycobacterium pyrenivorans is a scotochromogenic, rapidly growing mycobacterium, first isolated from an enrichment culture obtained from soil that was highly contaminated with polycyclic aromatic hydrocarbons (PAHs). The soil sample was collected on the site of a former coking plant at Ubach-Palenberg, Germany. Etymology: pyrenivorans; digesting pyrene.

== Description ==
Microscopy

- Gram-positive, acid-fast rods.

Colony characteristics

- The rough colonies show a scotochromogenic yellow colour, which intensifies after exposure to light.

Physiology

- A rapidly growing mycobacterium, growth appears within 7 days at 35 C
- Cells grow well between 24 and 37 C but not at 42 C.
- In liquid media, the cells clump together or show biofilm formation on glass.
- Catalase-positive. Nitrate reduction test shows a weak reaction.
- Does not hydrolyse Tween 80 within 10 days.
- Mineralizes phenanthrene, fluoranthene, and pyrene, but not anthracene or benzo[a]pyrene.

Differential characteristics

- The mycolic acid HPLC elution profile is unique and can be used for differentiation from the closely related species M. aurum, M. austroafricanum, M. vaccae and M. vanbaalenii and all other mycobacteria.

== Pathogenesis ==
- Isolated from an environmental source, not known to be pathogenic.

== Type strain ==
- The type strain was isolated from soil of a former coking plant at Ubach-Palenberg, Germany.
- Strain 17A3 = DSM 44605 = NRRL B-24349.
