= Benzopyrene =

Class of chemical compounds

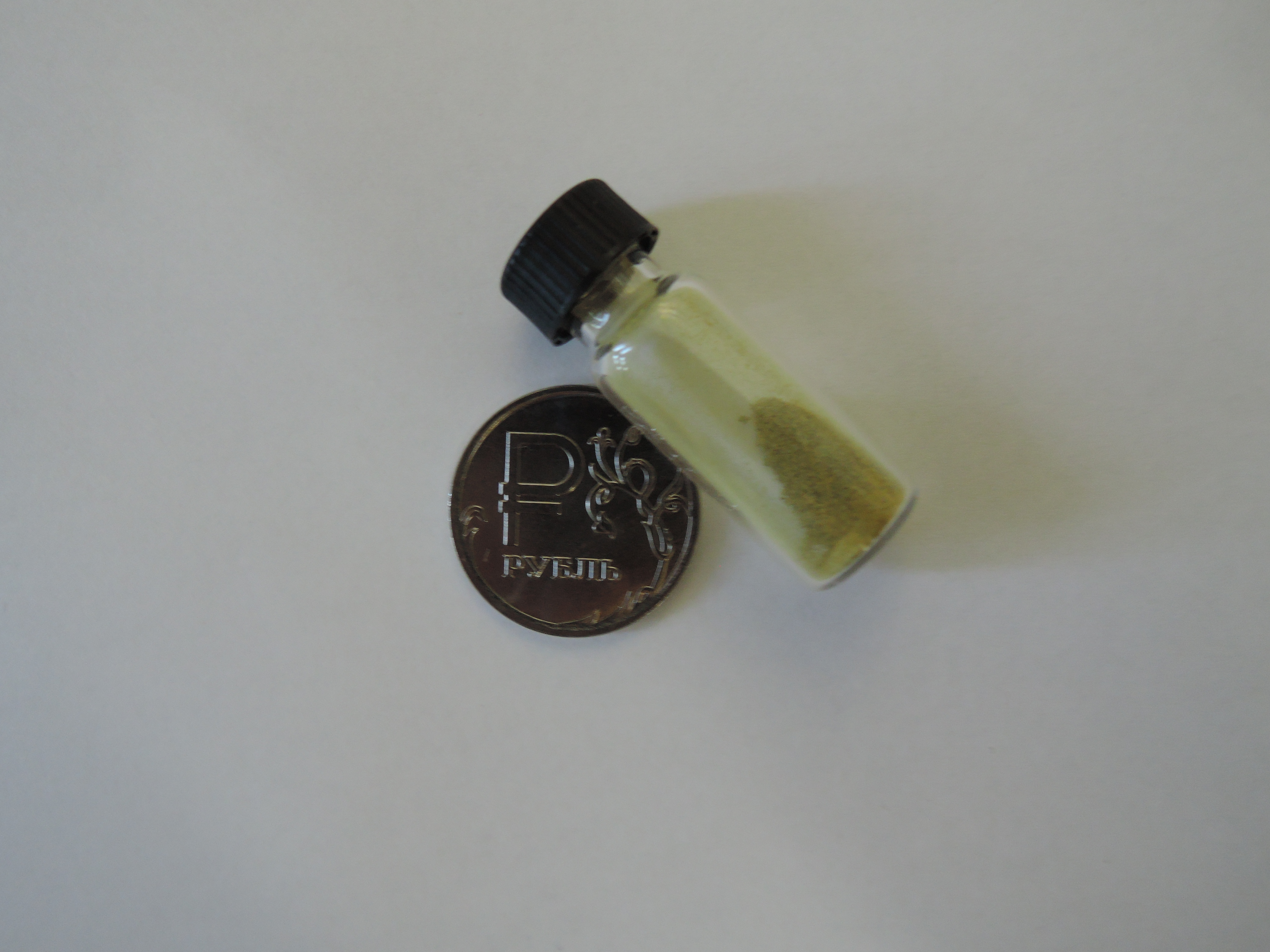
Benzopyrene with a purity of over 98%, with a Russian ruble for scale

Chemical structure of benzo[a]pyrene

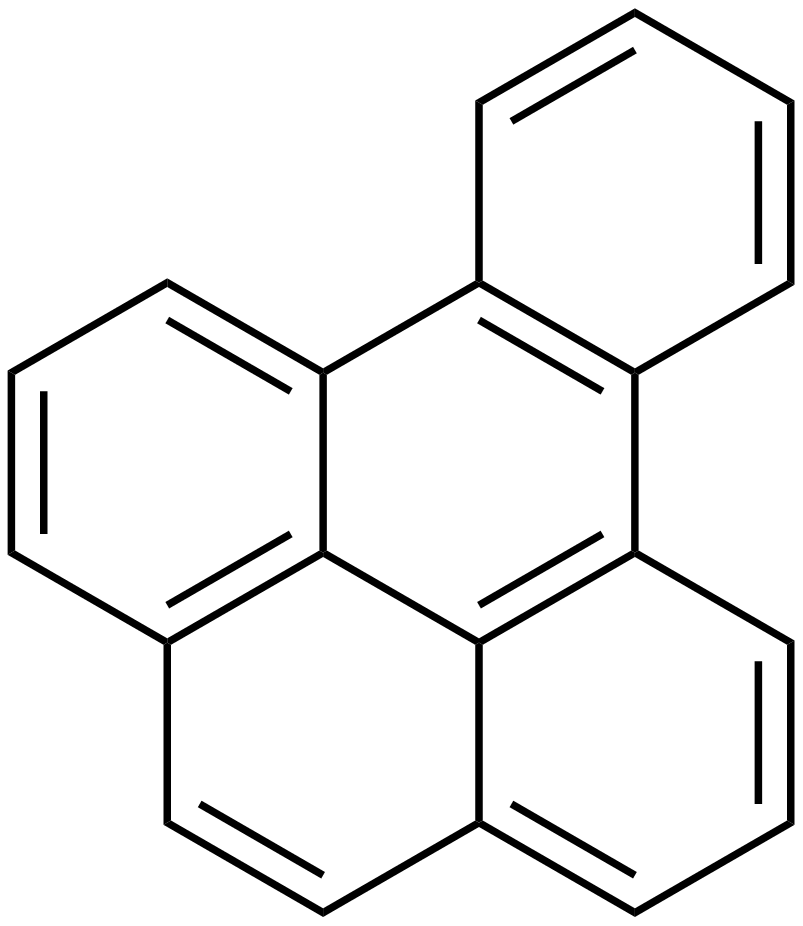
Chemical structure of benzo[e]pyrene

A benzopyrene is an organic compound with the formula C_{20}H_{12}. Structurally speaking, the colorless isomers of benzopyrene are pentacyclic hydrocarbons and are fusion products of pyrene and a phenylene group. Two isomeric species of benzopyrene are benzo[a]pyrene and the less common benzo[e]pyrene. They belong to the chemical class of polycyclic aromatic hydrocarbons.

== Overview ==
Related compounds include cyclopentapyrenes, dibenzopyrenes, indenopyrenes and naphthopyrenes. Benzopyrene is a component of pitch and occurs together with other related pentacyclic aromatic species such as picene, benzofluoranthenes, and perylene. It is naturally emitted by forest fires and volcanic eruptions and can also be found in coal tar, cigarette smoke, wood smoke, and burnt foods such as coffee. Fumes that develop from fat dripping on blistering charcoal are rich in benzopyrene, which can condense on grilled goods.

Benzopyrenes are harmful because they form carcinogenic and mutagenic metabolites (such as (+)-benzo[a]pyrene-7,8-dihydrodiol-9,10-epoxide from benzo[a]pyrene) which intercalate into DNA, interfering with transcription. They are considered pollutants and carcinogens. The mechanism of action of benzo[a]pyrene-related DNA modification has been investigated extensively and relates to the activity of cytochrome P450 subclass 1A1 (CYP1A1). Seemingly, the high activity of CYP1A1 in the intestinal mucosa prevents major amounts of ingested benzo[a]pyrene from entering portal blood and systemic circulation. The intestinal (but not hepatic) detoxification mechanism seems to depend on receptors that recognize bacterial surface components (TLR2).

Evidence exists to link benzo[a]pyrene to the formation of lung cancer.

In February 2014, NASA announced a greatly upgraded database for tracking polycyclic aromatic hydrocarbons (PAHs), including benzopyrene, in the universe. According to scientists, more than 20% of the carbon in the universe may be associated with PAHs, possible starting materials for the formation of life. PAHs seem to have been formed several billion years after the Big Bang, are widespread throughout the universe, and are associated with new stars and exoplanets.

== See also ==
- Benzo[a]pyrene
- Benzo[e]pyrene
