= C20H14O3 =

The molecular formula C_{20}H_{14}O_{3} (molar mass: 302.329 g/mol) may refer to:

- (+)-Benzo[a]pyrene-7,8-dihydrodiol-9,10-epoxide
- Florantyrone
