= Benzo(e)pyrene =

Chemical compound

Benzo[e]pyrene
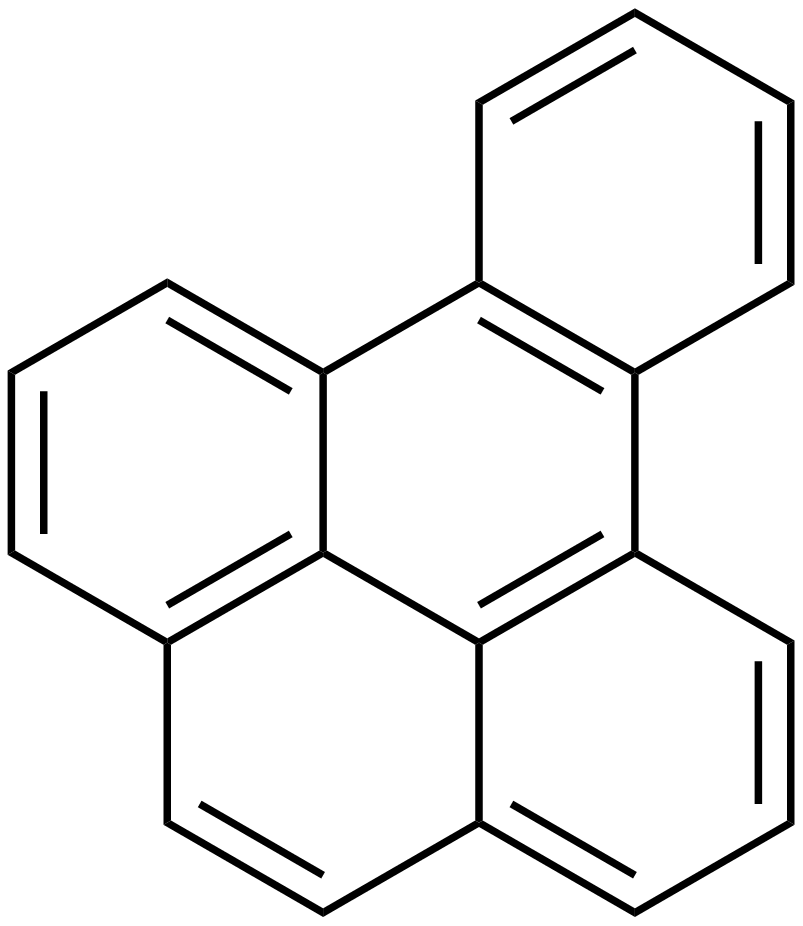
- Benzo[e]pyrene

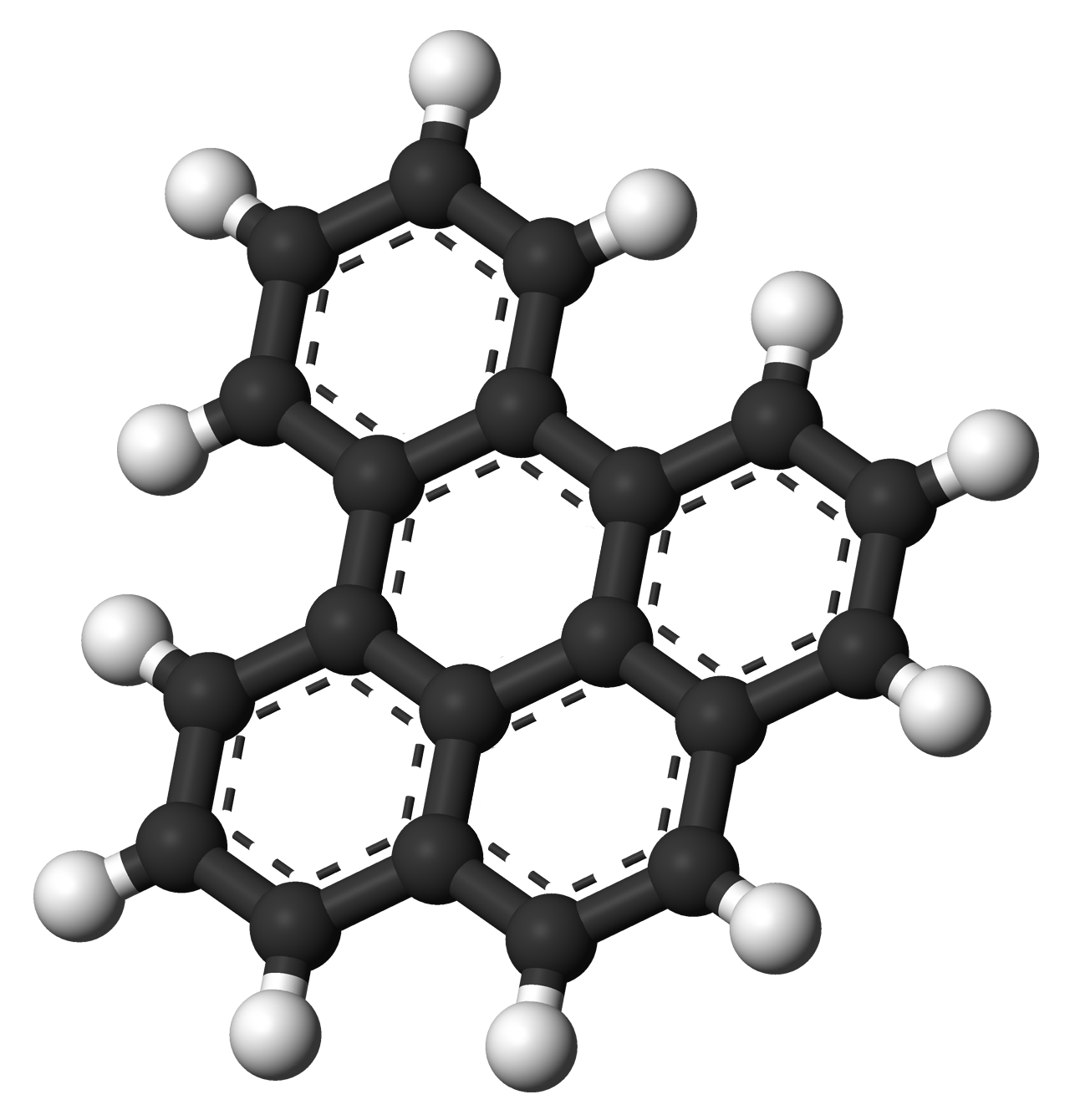

Names
- Preferred IUPAC name Benzo[e]pyrene
- Other names Pentacyclo[10.6.2.0^{2,7}.0^{8,20}.0^{15,19}]icosa-1,3,5,7,9,11,13,15,17,19-decaene

Identifiers
CAS Number	192-97-2
3D model (JSmol)	Interactive image
ChEBI	CHEBI:34567
ChEMBL	ChEMBL1371125
ChemSpider	8774
ECHA InfoCard	100.005.358
EC Number	205-892-7
KEGG	C14435
PubChem CID	9128
RTECS number	DJ4200000
UNII	63APT6398R
UN number	3077
CompTox Dashboard (EPA)	DTXSID3023764
- InChI: InChI=1S/C20H12/c1-2-8-16-15(7-1)17-9-3-5-13-11-12-14-6-4-10-18(16)20(14)19(13)17/h1-12H Key: TXVHTIQJNYSSKO-UHFFFAOYSA-N; InChI=1/C20H12/c1-2-8-16-15(7-1)17-9-3-5-13-11-12-14-6-4-10-18(16)20(14)19(13)17/h1-12H Key: TXVHTIQJNYSSKO-UHFFFAOYAC
- SMILES: c3ccc2ccc1cccc4c1c2c3c5c4cccc5

Properties
Chemical formula	C_{20}H_{12}
Molar mass	252.316 g·mol^{−1}
Density	1.286 g/cm^{3}

Hazards
- GHS labelling
Pictograms	(GHS08: Health hazard) (GHS09: Environmental hazard)
Signal word	Danger
Hazard statements	H350, H410
Precautionary statements	P201, P202, P273, P281, P308+P313, P391, P405, P501
Flash point	228.6 °C (443.5 °F; 501.8 K)
- Except where otherwise noted, data are given for materials in their standard state (at 25 °C [77 °F], 100 kPa). verify (what is ?) Infobox references

Benzo[e]pyrene (BeP) is a polycyclic aromatic hydrocarbon with the chemical formula C_{20}H_{12}. It is listed as a Group 3 carcinogen by the IARC.

== See also ==
- Benzopyrene
- Benzo[a]pyrene
- Benzene
- Pyrene, a four-ring analogue
