= Mycobacterium fluoranthenivorans =

Scientific classification
- Domain: Bacteria
- Kingdom: Bacillati
- Phylum: Actinomycetota
- Class: Actinomycetes
- Order: Mycobacteriales
- Family: Mycobacteriaceae
- Genus: Mycobacterium
- Species: M. fluoranthenivorans

Binomial name
- Mycobacterium fluoranthenivorans Hormisch et al. 2006, DSM 44556

Species of bacterium

Mycobacterium fluoranthenivorans is a species of the phylum Actinomycetota (gram-positive bacteria with high guanine and cytosine content, one of the dominant phyla of all bacteria), belonging to the genus Mycobacterium.

Etymology: fluoranthenivorans, digesting fluoranthene.

== Type strain ==
First isolated from contaminated soil of a former coal gas plant. Strain FA4 = DSM 44556 = CIP 108203.
