= Benzofluorene =

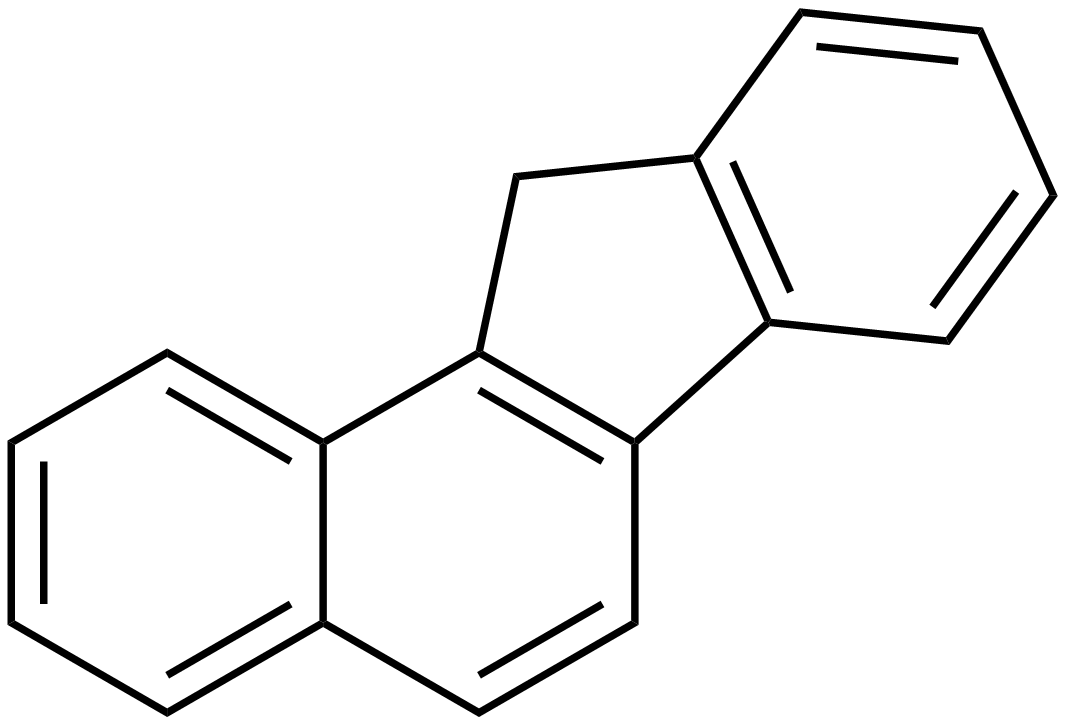
Chemical structure of Benzo[a]fluorene

Benzofluorene or the molecular formula C_{17}H_{12} may refer to:

- Benzo[a]fluorene, a polycyclic aromatic hydrocarbon (PAH)
- Benzo[b]fluorene
- Benzo[c]fluorene, a polycyclic aromatic hydrocarbon (PAH) with mutagenic activity
