= 1-Hydroxypyrene =

Names
- Preferred IUPAC name Pyren-1-ol

Identifiers
CAS Number	5315-79-7
3D model (JSmol)	Interactive image
ChEBI	CHEBI:34093
ChemSpider	20100
ECHA InfoCard	100.152.834
KEGG	C14519
PubChem CID	21387
UNII	N2H6O5V707
CompTox Dashboard (EPA)	DTXSID1038298
- InChI: InChI=1S/C16H10O/c17-14-9-7-12-5-4-10-2-1-3-11-6-8-13(14)16(12)15(10)11/h1-9,17H Key: BIJNHUAPTJVVNQ-UHFFFAOYSA-N; InChI=1/C16H10O/c17-14-9-7-12-5-4-10-2-1-3-11-6-8-13(14)16(12)15(10)11/h1-9,17H Key: BIJNHUAPTJVVNQ-UHFFFAOYAT
- SMILES: C1=CC2=C3C(=C1)C=CC4=C(C=CC(=C43)C=C2)O

Properties
Chemical formula	C_{16}H_{10}O
Molar mass	218.255 g·mol^{−1}
- Except where otherwise noted, data are given for materials in their standard state (at 25 °C [77 °F], 100 kPa). Infobox references

1-Hydroxypyrene is a human metabolite. It can be found in urine of outdoor workers exposed to air pollution.

== Biochemistry ==
Experiments in pigs show that urinary 1-hydroxypyrene is a metabolite of pyrene, when given orally.

A Mycobacterium sp. strain isolated from mangrove sediments produced 1-hydroxypyrene during the degradation of pyrene.

== Relationship with smoking ==
Highly significant differences and dose-response relationships with regard to cigarettes smoked per day were found for 2-, 3- and 4-hydroxyphenanthrene and 1-hydroxypyrene, but not for 1-hydroxyphenanthrene.
