= Perhydropyrene =

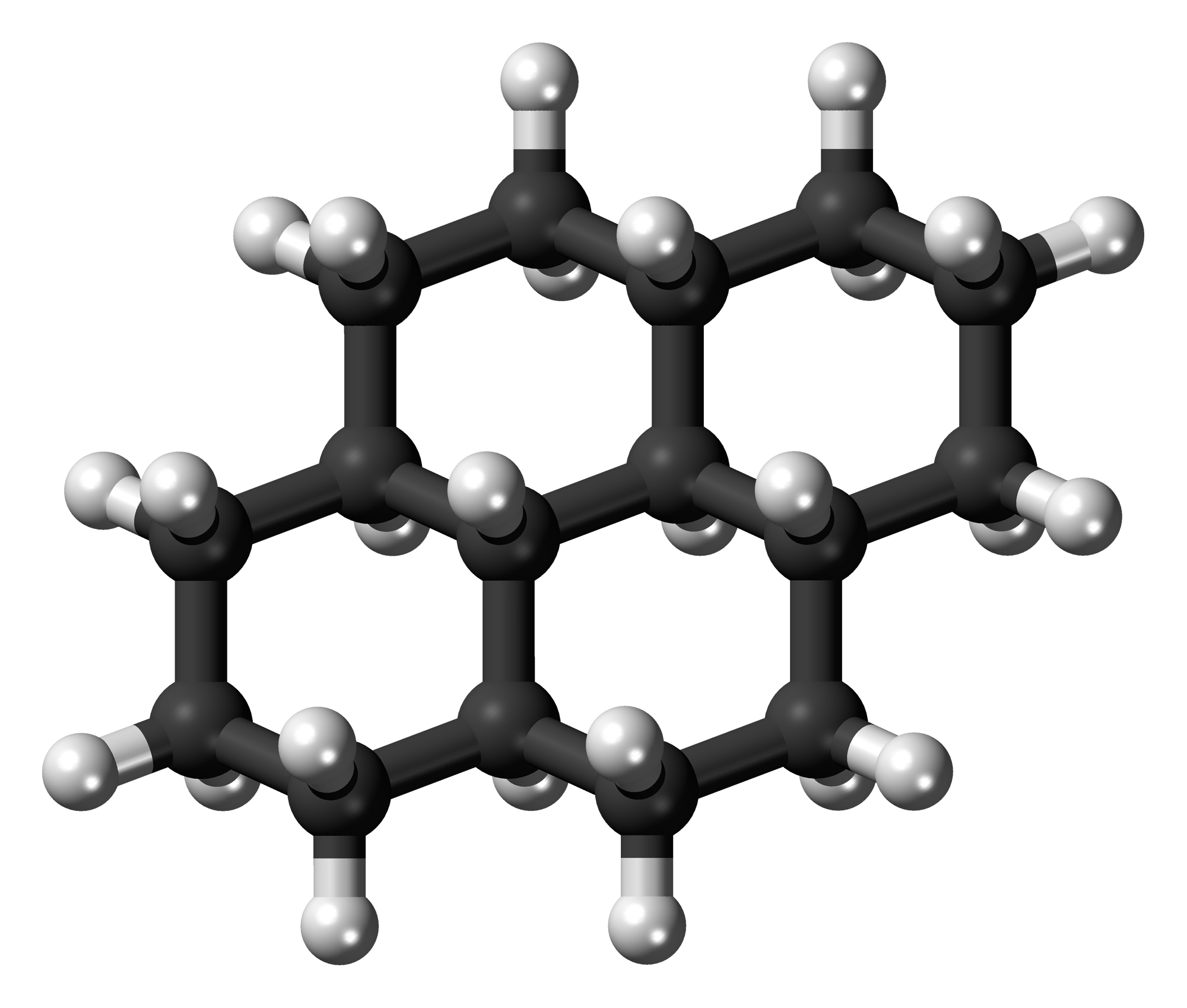

Names
- Preferred IUPAC name Hexadecahydropyrene

Identifiers
CAS Number	2435-85-0
3D model (JSmol)	Interactive image
ChemSpider	68050
ECHA InfoCard	100.017.663
PubChem CID	75524
UNII	K5UZS47HQS
CompTox Dashboard (EPA)	DTXSID70873304
- InChI: InChI=1S/C16H26/c1-3-11-7-9-13-5-2-6-14-10-8-12(4-1)15(11)16(13)14/h11-16H,1-10H2 Key: BYBPEZLZCGOWIS-UHFFFAOYSA-N; InChI=1S/C16H26/c1-3-11-7-9-13-5-2-6-14-10-8-12(4-1)15(11)16(13)14/h11-16H,1-10H2
- SMILES: C2CCC3CCC1C4C(CCC1)CCC2C34

Properties
Chemical formula	C_{16}H_{26}
Molar mass	218.384 g·mol^{−1}
Density	0.962 g/mL
- Except where otherwise noted, data are given for materials in their standard state (at 25 °C [77 °F], 100 kPa). verify (what is ?) Infobox references

Perhydropyrene is a hydrocarbon similar to pyrene. Single bonds with hydrogen replace the double bonds in the benzene rings.
