= Benzo(a)pyrene =

Carcinogenic compound found in smoke and soot

Benzo[a]pyrene
- Benzo[a]pyrene Skeletal formula

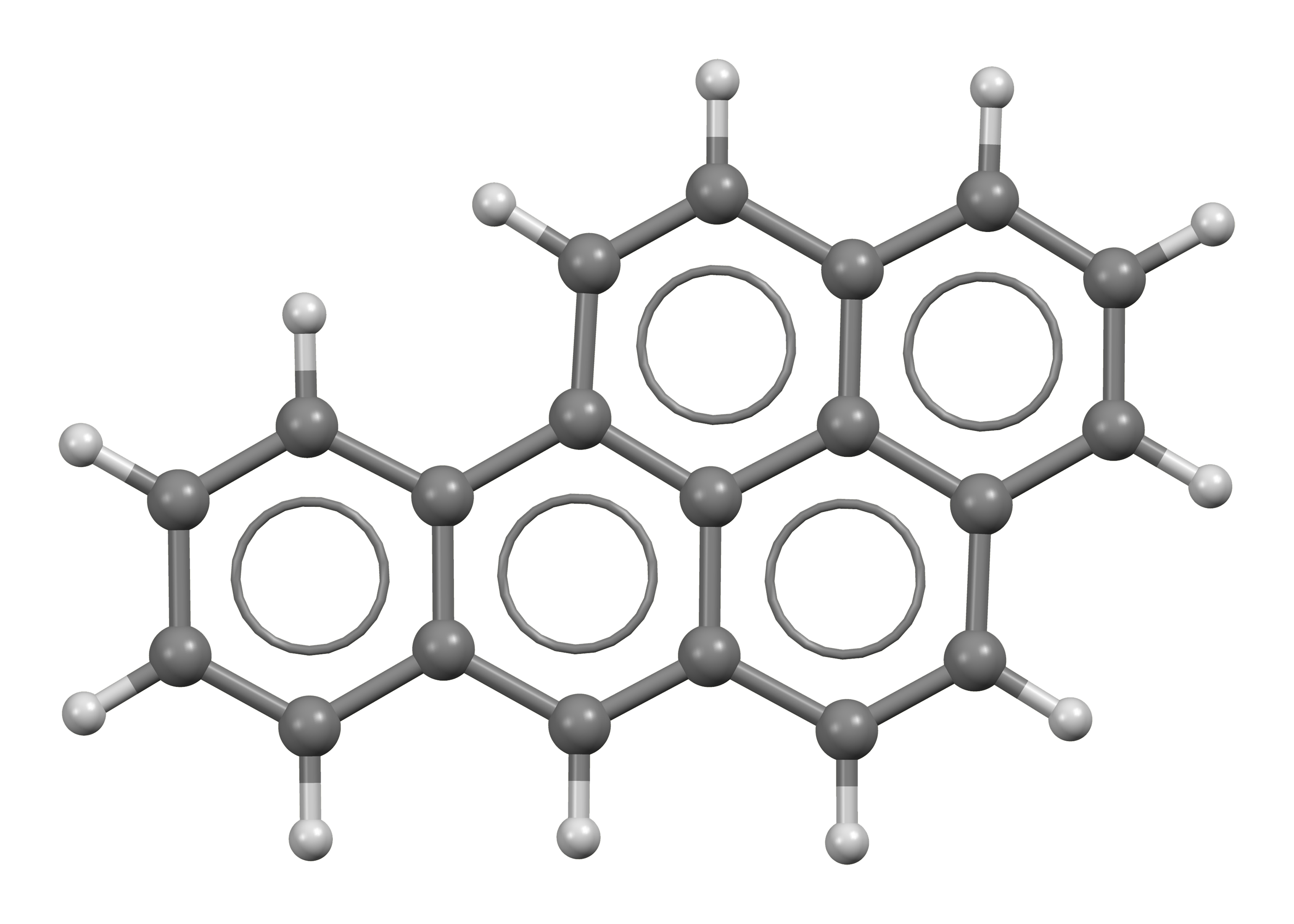
- Ball-and-stick model

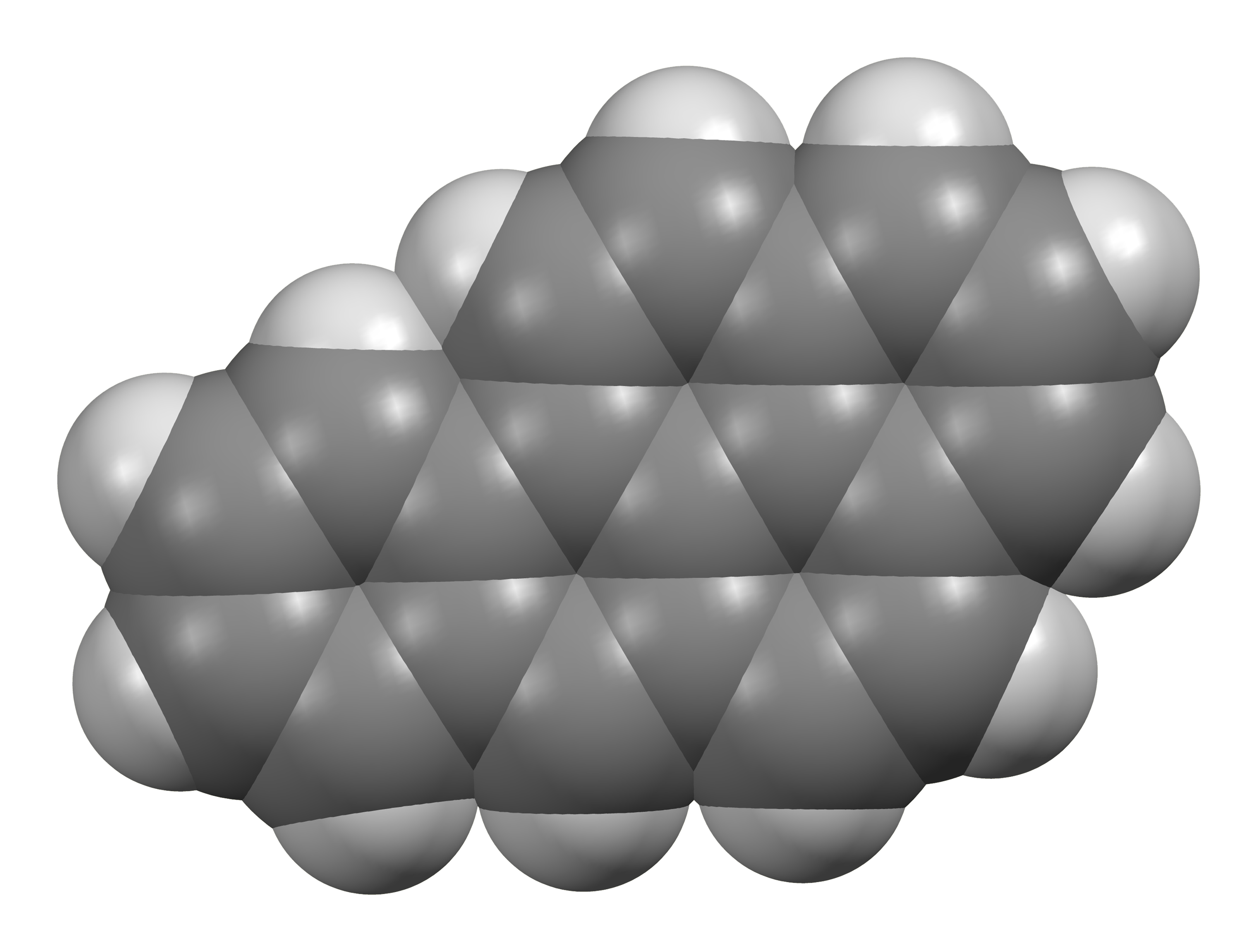
- Space-filling model

Names
- Preferred IUPAC name Benzo[pqr]tetraphene
- Other names: Benz[a]pyrene; Benzo[a]pyrene; 3,4-Benzpyrene; 3,4-Benzopyrene; 3,4-Benz[a]pyrene; 3,4-Benzo[a]pyrene; Pentacyclo[10.6.2.0^{2,7}.0^{9,19}.0^{16,20}]icosa-1,3,5,7,9,11,13,15,17,19-decaene

Identifiers
CAS Number	50-32-8
3D model (JSmol)	Interactive image
ChEBI	CHEBI:29865
ChEMBL	ChEMBL31184
ChemSpider	2246
ECHA InfoCard	100.000.026
EC Number	200-028-5
KEGG	C07535
PubChem CID	2336
RTECS number	DJ3675000
UNII	3417WMA06D
UN number	3077, 3082
CompTox Dashboard (EPA)	DTXSID2020139
- InChI: InChI=1S/C20H12/c1-2-7-17-15(4-1)12-16-9-8-13-5-3-6-14-10-11-18(17)20(16)19(13)14/h1-12H Key: FMMWHPNWAFZXNH-UHFFFAOYSA-N; InChI=1/C20H12/c1-2-7-17-15(4-1)12-16-9-8-13-5-3-6-14-10-11-18(17)20(16)19(13)14/h1-12H Key: FMMWHPNWAFZXNH-UHFFFAOYAQ
- SMILES: c1ccc2c(c1)cc3ccc4cccc5c4c3c2cc5

Properties
Chemical formula	C_{20}H_{12}
Molar mass	252.316 g·mol^{−1}
Density	1.24 g/cm^{3} (25 °C)
Melting point	179 °C (354 °F; 452 K)
Boiling point	495 °C (923 °F; 768 K)
Solubility in water	0.2 to 6.2 μg/L
Magnetic susceptibility (χ)	−135.7·10^{−6} cm^{3}/mol

Hazards
- GHS labelling
Pictograms	(GHS07: Exclamation mark) (GHS08: Health hazard) (GHS09: Environmental hazard)
Signal word	Danger
Hazard statements	H317, H340, H350, H360, H410
Precautionary statements	P201, P202, P261, P272, P273, P280, P281, P302+P352, P308+P313, P321, P333+P313, P363, P391, P405, P501
- Except where otherwise noted, data are given for materials in their standard state (at 25 °C [77 °F], 100 kPa). verify (what is ?) Infobox references

Benzo[a]pyrene (BaP or B[a]P) is a polycyclic aromatic hydrocarbon (PAH) and the result of incomplete combustion of organic matter at temperatures between 300 and 600 °C (572 and 1,112 °F). The ubiquitous compound can be found in coal tar, tobacco smoke and many foods, especially grilled meats. The substance with the formula C_{20}H_{12} is one of the benzopyrenes, formed by a benzene ring fused to pyrene. Its diol epoxide metabolites, more commonly known as BPDE, react with and bind to DNA, resulting in mutations and eventually cancer. It is listed as a Group 1 carcinogen by the IARC. In the 18th century a scrotal cancer of chimney sweepers, the chimney sweeps' carcinoma, was already known to be connected to soot.

A sample of 3,4-Benzpyrene

== Description ==
Benzo[a]pyrene (BaP) is a polycyclic aromatic hydrocarbon found in coal tar with the formula C_{20}H_{12}. The compound is one of the benzopyrenes, formed by a benzene ring fused to pyrene, and is the result of incomplete combustion at temperatures between 300 °C (572 °F) and 600 °C (1,112 °F).

== Sources ==
The main source of atmospheric BaP is residential wood burning. It is also found in coal tar, in automobile exhaust fumes (especially from diesel engines), in all smoke resulting from the combustion of organic material (including cigarette smoke), and in charbroiled food. Data collected in 2024 by the European Environment Agency from all, except Portugal, EU-27 Member States as well as from Norway and Switzerland showed that the highest concentrations of BaP were found in eastern Europe and Italy, mainly associated with residential heating using coal, wood or derivatives. Methods of identifying BaP in foods have advanced over the years but difficulties remain in balancing speed with accuracy. Established methods include gas chromatography–mass spectrometry and high-performance liquid chromatography with fluorescence detection. A 2001 National Cancer Institute study found levels of BaP to be significantly higher in foods that were cooked well-done on the barbecue, particularly steaks, chicken with skin, and hamburgers: Cooked meat products have been shown to contain up to 4 ng/g of BaP, and up to 5.5 ng/g in fried chicken and 62.6 ng/g in overcooked charcoal barbecued beef. In 2008 the European Food Safety Authority stated that BaP was the only PAH that was regulated in food at the time. However, they stated it was not a suitable standalone indicator for the occurrence of PAHs in food and recommended using the sum of either four or eight PAHs as more suitable indicators for that matter. Since 2023 the European Commission Regulation 2023/915 states that processing contaminants of food though PAHs are not allowed to exceed a sum of 4 PAHs for BaP in order to protect public health.

BaP is discharged in wastewater by industries such as smelters, particularly iron and steel mills and aluminium smelters.

== History ==
In the 18th century, young British chimney sweeps who climbed into chimneys suffered from chimney sweeps' carcinoma, a scrotal cancer peculiar to their profession, and this was connected to the effects of soot in 1775, in the first work of occupational cancer epidemiology and also the first connection of any chemical mixture to cancer formation. Frequent skin cancers were noted among fuel industry workers in the 19th century. In 1933, BaP was determined to be the compound responsible for these cases, and its carcinogenicity was demonstrated when skin tumors occurred in laboratory animals repeatedly painted with coal tar. BaP has since been identified as a prime carcinogen in cigarette smoke. Public health authorities distinguish between the addictive effects of nicotine and the carcinogenic substances present in cigarette smoke, such as BaP.

== Toxicity ==
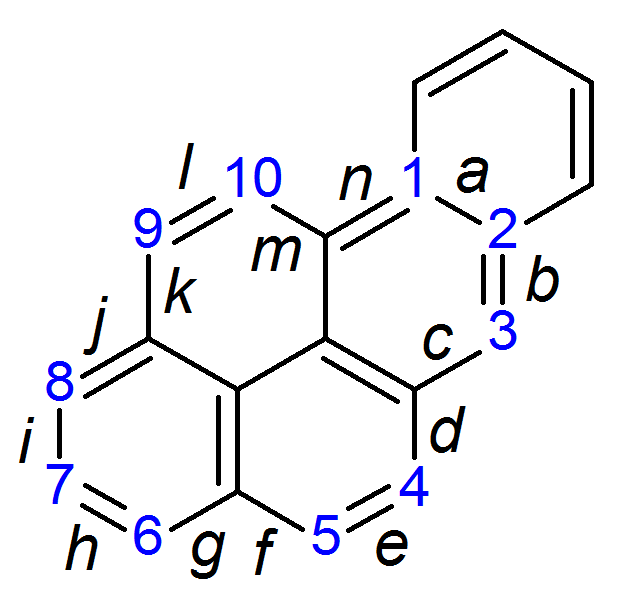
Benzo[a]pyrene, showing the base pyrene ring and numbering and ring fusion locations according to IUPAC nomenclature of organic chemistry.

A 2021 World Health Organization (WHO) report on PAHs as ambient air pollutants stated that it was not possible to establish if the current WHO guidelines for BaP provided sufficient protection against diseases other than cancer.

=== Carcinogenicity ===
The National Toxicology Program from the Department of Health and Human Services published the Fifteenth Edition Report on Carcinogens, which stated that BaP caused tumors in 8 species, including nonhuman primates.

=== Nervous system ===
Prenatal exposure of BaP in rats is known to affect learning and memory in rodent models. Pregnant rats eating BaP were shown to negatively affect the brain function in the late life of their offspring. At a time when synapses are first formed and adjusted in strength by activity, BaP diminished NMDA receptor-dependent nerve cell activity measured as mRNA expression of the NMDA NR2B receptor subunit.

=== Immune system ===
BaP has an effect on the number of white blood cells, inhibiting some of them from differentiating into macrophages, the body's first line of defense to fight infections. In 2016, the molecular mechanism was uncovered as damage to the macrophage membrane's lipid raft integrity by decreasing membrane cholesterol at 25%. This means less immunoreceptors CD32 (a member of the Fc family of immunoreceptors) could bind to IgG and turn the white blood cell into a macrophage. Therefore, macrophage membranes become susceptible to bacterial infections.

=== Reproductive system ===
In experiments with male rats, subchronic exposure to inhaled BaP has been shown to generally reduce the function of testicles and epididymis with lower sex steroid/testosterone production and sperm production.

=== Carcinogenicity ===
BaP's metabolites are mutagenic and highly carcinogenic, and it is listed as a Group 1 carcinogen by the IARC. Chemical agents and related occupations, Volume 10, A review of Human Carcinogens, IARC Monographs, Lyon France 2009

In June 2016, BaP was added as benzo[def]chrysene to the REACH Candidate List of Substances of very high concern for Authorisation.

Numerous studies since the 1970s have documented links between BaP and cancers. It has been more difficult to link cancers to specific BaP sources, especially in humans, and difficult to quantify risks posed by various methods of exposure (inhalation or ingestion). A link between vitamin A deficiency and emphysema in smokers was described in 2005 to be due to BaP, which induces vitamin A deficiency in rats.

A 1996 study provided molecular evidence linking components in tobacco smoke to lung cancer. BaP was shown to cause genetic damage in lung cells that was identical to the damage observed in the DNA of most malignant lung tumours.

Regular consumption of cooked meats has been epidemiologically associated with increased levels of colon cancer (although this in itself does not prove carcinogenicity), A 2005 NCI study found an increased risk of colorectal adenomas was associated with BaP intake, and more strongly with BaP intake from all foods.

The detoxification enzymes cytochrome P450 1A1 (CYP1A1) and cytochrome P450 1B1 (CYP1B1) are both protective and necessary for benzo[a]pyrene toxicity. Experiments with strains of mice engineered to remove (knockout) CYP1A1 and CYP1B1 reveal that CYP1A1 primarily acts to protect mammals from low doses of BaP, and that removing this protection accumulates large concentrations of BaP. Unless CYP1B1 is also knocked out, toxicity results from the bioactivation of BaP to benzo[a]pyrene -7,8-dihydrodiol-9,10-epoxide, the ultimate toxic compound.

=== Interaction with DNA ===
Metabolism of benzo[a]pyrene yielding the carcinogenic benzo[a]pyren-7,8-dihydrodiol-9,10-epoxide.

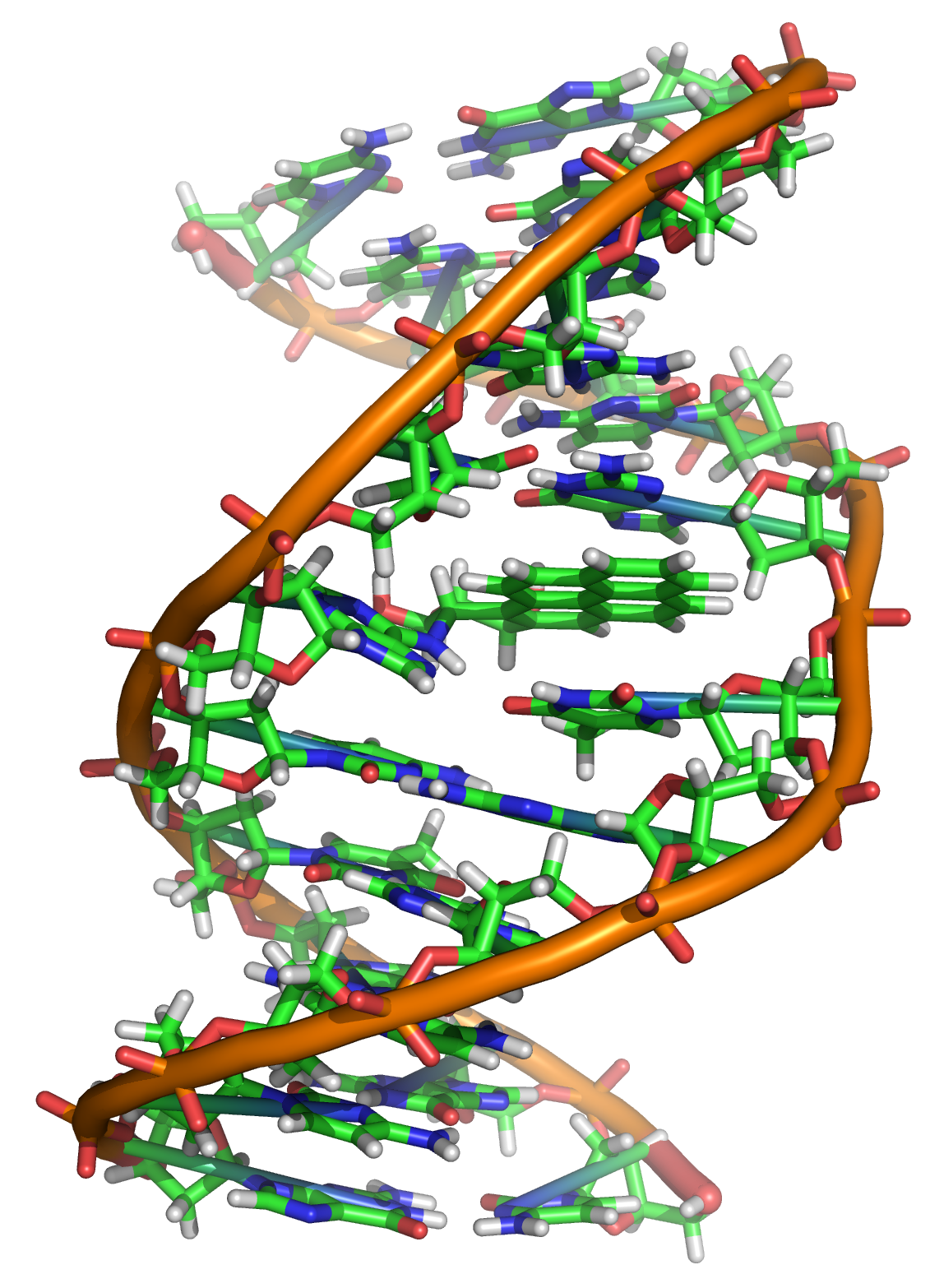
A DNA adduct (at center) of benzo[a]pyrene, the major mutagen in tobacco smoke.

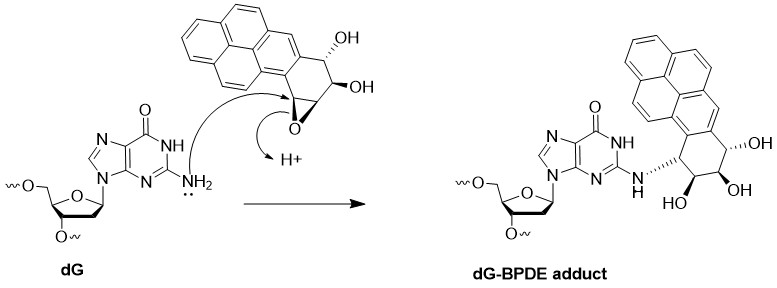
Properly speaking, BaP is a procarcinogen, meaning that its mechanism of carcinogenesis depends on its enzymatic metabolism to BaP diol epoxide It intercalates in DNA, and the electrophilic epoxide is attacked by nucleophilic guanine bases, forming a bulky guanine adduct.

X-ray crystallographic and nuclear magnetic resonance structure studies have shown how this binding distorts the DNA by perturbing the double-helical DNA structure. This disrupts the normal process of copying DNA and induces mutations, which explains the occurrence of cancer after exposure. This mechanism of action is similar to that of aflatoxin which binds to the N7 position of guanine.

There are indications that benzo[a]pyrene diol epoxide specifically targets the protective p53 gene. This gene is a transcription factor that regulates the cell cycle and hence functions as a tumor suppressor. By inducing G (guanine) to T (thymidine) transversions in transversion hotspots within p53, there is a probability that benzo[a]pyrene diol epoxide inactivates the tumor suppression ability in certain cells, leading to cancer.

Benzo[a]pyrene-7,8-dihydrodiol-9,10-epoxide is the carcinogenic product of three enzymatic reactions:

1. Benzo[a]pyrene is first oxidized by cytochrome P450 1A1 to form a variety of products, including (+)-benzo[a]pyrene-7,8-epoxide.
2. This product is metabolized by epoxide hydrolase, opening up the epoxide ring to yield (−)-benzo[a]pyrene-7,8-dihydrodiol.
3. The ultimate carcinogen is formed after another reaction with cytochrome P450 1A1 to yield the (+)-benzo[a]pyrene-7,8-dihydrodiol-9,10-epoxide. It is this diol epoxide that covalently binds to DNA.

BaP induces cytochrome P450 1A1 (CYP1A1) by binding to the AHR (aryl hydrocarbon receptor) in the cytosol. Upon binding the transformed receptor translocates to the nucleus where it dimerises with ARNT (aryl hydrocarbon receptor nuclear translocator) and then binds xenobiotic response elements (XREs) in DNA located upstream of certain genes. This process increases transcription of certain genes, notably CYP1A1, followed by increased CYP1A1 protein production. This process is similar to induction of CYP1A1 by certain polychlorinated biphenyls and dioxins. Seemingly, CYP1A1 activity in the intestinal mucosa prevents major amounts of ingested benzo[a]pyrene to enter portal blood and systemic circulation. Intestinal, but not hepatic, expression of CYP1A1 depends on TOLL-like receptor 2 (TLR2), which is a eukaryotic receptor for bacterial surface structures such as lipoteichoic acid.

Moreover, BaP has been found to activate a transposon, LINE1, in humans.

== Nucleotide excision repair ==
As illustrated above, (+)-benzo[a]pyrene-7,8-dihydrodiol-9,10-epoxide (BPDE) forms bulky covalent DNA adducts with guanines. Most of these adducts can be efficiently eliminated from DNA by the process of nucleotide excision repair. Those adducts that are not removed can cause errors during DNA replication leading to carcinogenic mutations.

== See also ==
- Benzopyrene
- Benzo[e]pyrene
- Pyrene, a four-ring analogue
- Toxification
