= Benzo(a)fluorene =

Chemical compound

Benzo[a]fluorene
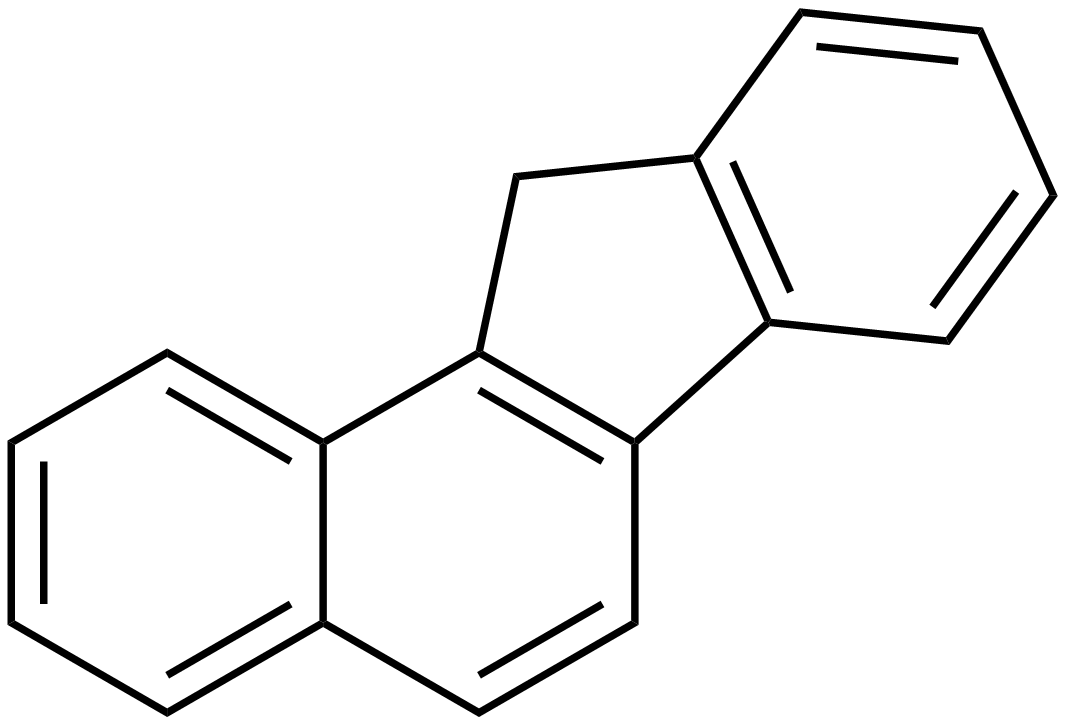

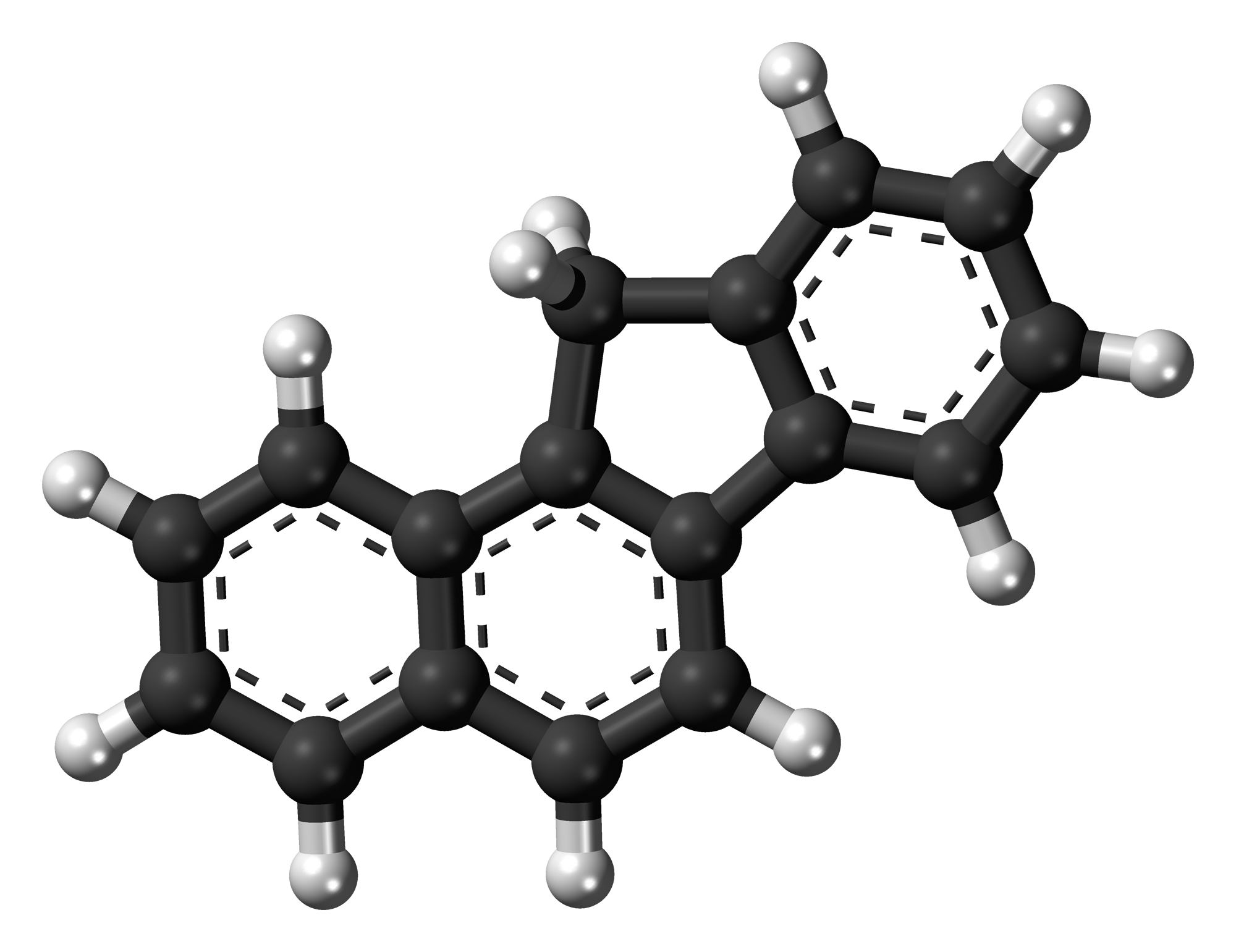

Names
- Preferred IUPAC name 11H-Benzo[a]fluorene
- Other names 2,3-Benzopyrene; Tetracyclo[8.7.0.0^{2,7}.0^{11,16}]heptadeca-1,3,5,7,9,11,13,15-octaene

Identifiers
CAS Number	238-84-6
3D model (JSmol)	Interactive image
ChemSpider	8840
ECHA InfoCard	100.005.405
EC Number	205-944-9
KEGG	C19343
PubChem CID	9195
RTECS number	DF6382000
UNII	65EP6ZT62K
CompTox Dashboard (EPA)	DTXSID3075204
- InChI: InChI=1S/C17H12/c1-3-7-14-12(5-1)9-10-16-15-8-4-2-6-13(15)11-17(14)16/h1-10H,11H2 Key: HKMTVMBEALTRRR-UHFFFAOYSA-N; InChI=1/C17H12/c1-3-7-14-12(5-1)9-10-16-15-8-4-2-6-13(15)11-17(14)16/h1-10H,11H2 Key: HKMTVMBEALTRRR-UHFFFAOYAQ
- SMILES: c4ccc3c2c(c1c(cccc1)C2)ccc3c4

Properties
Chemical formula	C_{17}H_{12}
Molar mass	216.277 g/mol
Density	0.819 g/cm^{3}
Melting point	189.5 °C (373.1 °F; 462.6 K)
Boiling point	405 °C (761 °F; 678 K)
Solubility in water	0.000045 g/L
Solubility	soluble in diethyl ether, benzene, chloroform
- Except where otherwise noted, data are given for materials in their standard state (at 25 °C [77 °F], 100 kPa). verify (what is ?) Infobox references

Benzo[a]fluorene (IUPAC name, 11H-benzo[a]fluorene) is a polycyclic aromatic hydrocarbon (PAH). It is currently listed as a Group 3 carcinogen by the IARC.

== See also ==
- Benzo[c]fluorene
- Benzofluorene
