= 1-Hydroxyphenanthrene =

Names
- Preferred IUPAC name Phenanthren-1-ol
- Other names 1-Phenanthrenol; 1-Phenanthrol; 1-hydroxy-phenanthrene

Identifiers
CAS Number	2433-56-9
3D model (JSmol)	Interactive image
Beilstein Reference	1869717
ChEBI	CHEBI:27528
ChemSpider	88945
KEGG	C11432
PubChem CID	98490
UNII	Y1FTF7MUY7
CompTox Dashboard (EPA)	DTXSID90872758
- InChI: InChI=1S/C14H10O/c15-14-7-3-6-12-11-5-2-1-4-10(11)8-9-13(12)14/h1-9,15H Key: GTBXZWADMKOZQJ-UHFFFAOYSA-N
- SMILES: C1=CC=C2C(=C1)C=CC3=C2C=CC=C3O

Properties
Chemical formula	C_{14}H_{10}O
Molar mass	194.233 g·mol^{−1}
- Except where otherwise noted, data are given for materials in their standard state (at 25 °C [77 °F], 100 kPa). Infobox references

1-Hydroxyphenanthrene is a phenanthrol and a human metabolite of phenanthrene that can be detected in urine of persons exposed to PAHs.

It can also be used as a marker for PAH pollution measured in marine fish bile.

The model fungus Cunninghamella elegans produces, in the case of the biodegradation of phenanthrene, a glucoside conjugate of 1-hydroxyphenanthrene (phenanthrene 1-O-beta-glucose).

== Relationship with smoking ==
Highly significant differences and dose-response relationships with regard to cigarettes smoked per day were found for 2-, 3- and 4-hydroxyphenanthrene and 1-hydroxypyrene, but not for 1-hydroxyphenanthrene.
