= Florantyrone =

Chemical compound

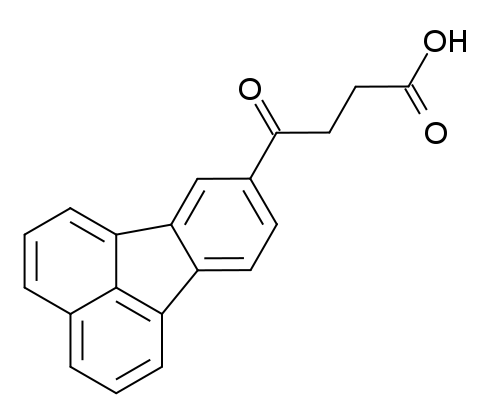

Clinical data
- ATC code: none

Identifiers
- IUPAC name: 4-fluoranthen-8-yl-4-oxobutanoic acid
- CAS Number: 519-95-9
- PubChem CID: 10617
- DrugBank: DB08975
- ChemSpider: 10172
- UNII: UZ5LMI200P
- ChEMBL: ChEMBL2106357
- CompTox Dashboard (EPA): DTXSID3023055
- ECHA InfoCard: 100.007.528

Chemical and physical data
- Formula: C_{20}H_{14}O_{3}
- Molar mass: 302.329 g·mol^{−1}
- 3D model (JSmol): Interactive image
- Melting point: 195 °C (383 °F)
- Solubility in water: soluble in methanol, ethanol, sodium carbonate mg/mL (20 °C)
- SMILES: C1=CC2=C3C(=C1)C4=C(C3=CC=C2)C=C(C=C4)C(=O)CCC(=O)O
- InChI: InChI=1S/C20H14O3/c21-18(9-10-19(22)23)13-7-8-14-15-5-1-3-12-4-2-6-16(20(12)15)17(14)11-13/h1-8,11H,9-10H2,(H,22,23); Key:QOBAOSCOLAGPKI-UHFFFAOYSA-N

Florantyrone (INN; also known as fluorantyrone) is a drug used in the treatment of biliary dyskinesia. It is also known as a cholagogue and choleretic.

It is manufactured from fluoranthene and succinic anhydride in the presence of aluminum chloride in a nitrobenzene solution. (US PATENT 2,560,425 (1951 To Miles Lab)).
