= (+)-Benzo(a)pyrene-7,8-dihydrodiol-9,10-epoxide =

Cancer-causing agent derived from tobacco smoke

(+)-Benzo[a]pyrene-7,8-dihydrodiol-9,10-epoxide
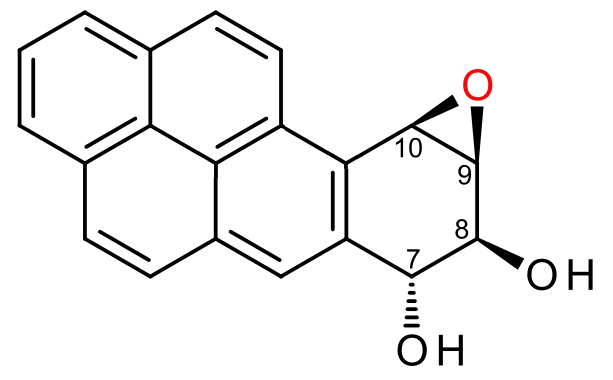
- (+)-Benzo[a]pyrene-7,8-dihydrodiol-9,10-epoxide

Names
- Preferred IUPAC name (7R,8S,8aS,9aR)-7,8,8a,9a-Tetrahydrobenzo[1,12]tetrapheno[10,11-b]oxirene-7,8-diol
- Other names (+)-Benzo[a]pyrene-7,8-dihydrodiol-9,10-epoxide (+)-7,8,9,10-Tetrahydrobenzo[a]pyrene-7,8-diol-9,10-epoxide (7R,8S,8aR,9aS)-7,8,8a,9a-Tetrahydrobenzo[1,12]tetrapheno[10,11-b]oxirene-7,8-diol; 7,8,8a,9a-Tetrahydro-(7R,8S,8aR,9aS)-benzo[10,11]chryseno[3,4-b]oxirene-7,8-diol

Identifiers
CAS Number	58917-91-2
3D model (JSmol)	Interactive image
ChemSpider	40465
PubChem CID	42879
UNII	8942B964DU
- InChI: InChI=1S/C20H14O3/c21-17-13-8-11-5-4-9-2-1-3-10-6-7-12(15(11)14(9)10)16(13)19-20(23-19)18(17)22/h1-8,17-22H/t17-,18+,19+,20-/m1/s1 Key: DQEPMTIXHXSFOR-FUMNGEBKSA-N
- SMILES: O[C@@H]3c1cc4ccc5cccc6ccc(c1[C@H]2O[C@H]2[C@H]3O)c4c56

Properties
Chemical formula	C_{20}H_{14}O_{3}
Molar mass	302.329 g·mol^{−1}
Density	1.6 ± 0.1 g cm^{−3}
Boiling point	594.2 ± 50.0 °C at 760 mmHg
Solubility	Soluble in dimethyl sulfoxide, dichloromethane, methanol
- Except where otherwise noted, data are given for materials in their standard state (at 25 °C [77 °F], 100 kPa). Infobox references

(+)-Benzo[a]pyrene-7,8-dihydrodiol-9,10-epoxide is an organic compound with molecular formula C_{20}H_{14}O_{3}. It is a metabolite and derivative of benzo[a]pyrene (found in tobacco smoke) as a result of oxidation to include hydroxyl and epoxide functionalities. (+)-Benzo[a]pyrene-7,8-dihydrodiol-9,10-epoxide binds to the N2 atom of a guanine nucleobase in DNA, distorting the double helix structure by intercalation of the pyrene moiety between base pairs through π-stacking. The carcinogenic properties of tobacco smoking are attributed in part to this compound binding and inactivating the tumor suppression ability of certain genes, leading to genetic mutations and potentially to cancer.

== Structure ==
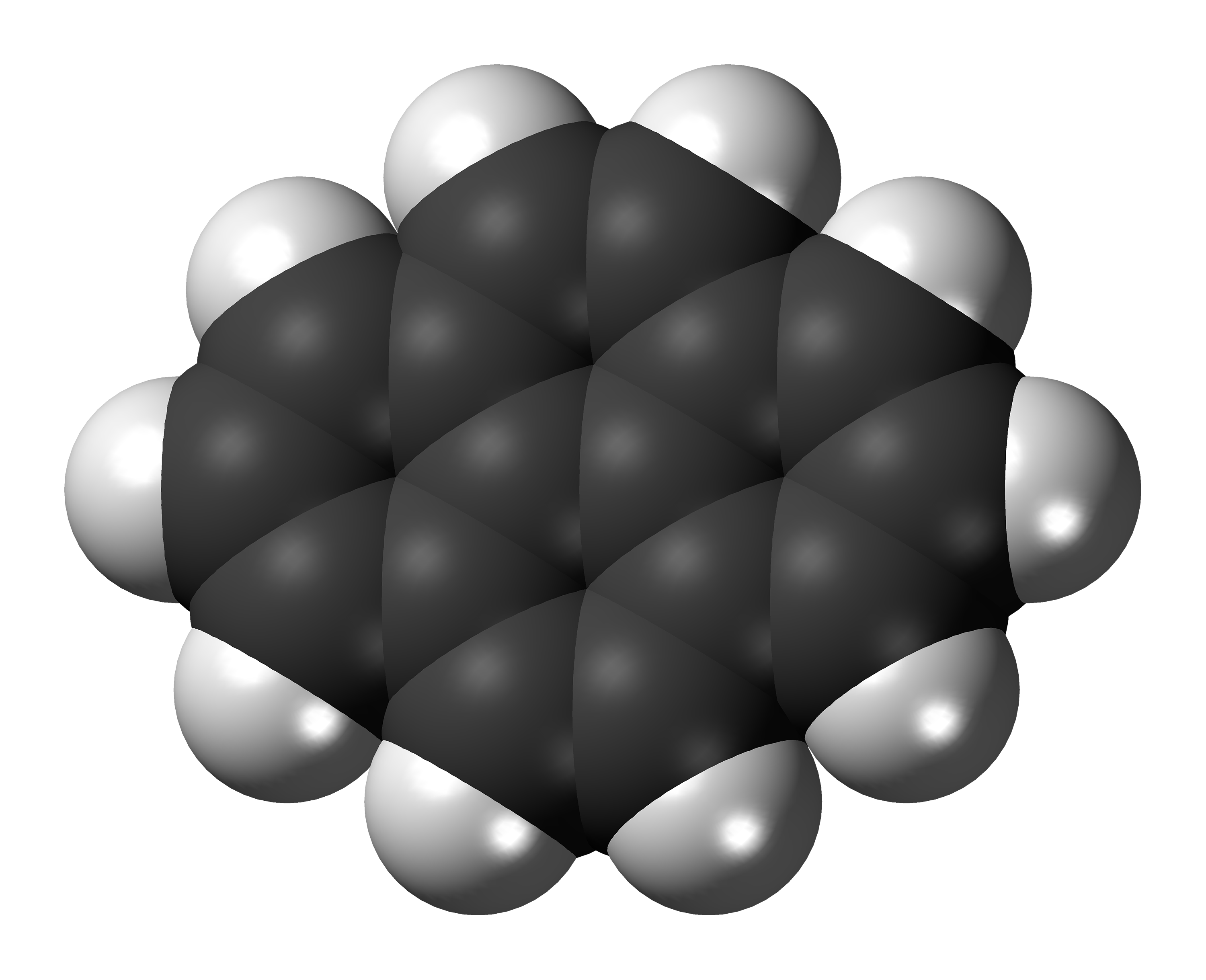
Space-filling model of pyrene showing the planar structure

Pyrene is a polycyclic aromatic hydrocarbon consisting of four benzene rings fused together in a planar aromatic arrangement which approximates a rhombus in shape. Benzo[a]pyrene is a derivative in which a fifth benzene ring has been fused to the pyrene system, and is a component of tobacco smoke which is a procarcinogen partly responsible for the carcinogenic and mutagenic effects of smoking. Benzo[a]pyrene-7,8-dihydrodiol-9,10-epoxide is a metabolite of benzo[a]pyrene formed by the introduction of vicinal hydroxyl and epoxide functional groups to the fifth benzene ring. These oxidations are stereoselective, producing the pair of enantiomers with the hydroxyl groups on opposite sides of the pyrene plane and with the epoxide on the same side as its adjacent hydroxyl group. (+)-Benzo[a]pyrene-7,8-dihydrodiol-9,10-epoxide is specifically the (7R,8S,8aR,9aS) stereoisomer.

=== Biosynthesis ===
The metabolism of the tobacco smoke procarcinogen benzo[a]pyrene involves three distinct steps – the introduction of an epoxide group in the 7,8-position, its hydration to a vicinal diol and the introduction of an epoxide in the 9,10-position. In the first step, a cytochrome P450 1A1 (CYP1A1) catalysed oxidation produces several products including (+)-benzo[a]pyrene-7,8-epoxide. The enzyme epoxide hydrolase, then hydrates the epoxide ring to yield the vicinal diol (−)-benzo[a]pyrene-7,8-dihydrodiol, which is then oxidised by cytochrome P450 oxidase again forming the mutagen and carcinogen (+)-benzo[a]pyrene-7,8-dihydrodiol-9,10-epoxide. This diol epoxide covalently binds to DNA by a ring-opening to alkylate the nucleobase forming a distorted structure, as shown at right, with intercalation of a pyrene polycyclic aromatic hydrocarbon moiety between the base pairs favouring π-stacking; these distortions have been confirmed by X-ray crystallographic and nuclear magnetic resonance structure studies. Aflatoxin has a similar mechanism of action, though its binding is through the N7, rather than the N2, position of guanine. Multiple stereochemical outcomes are possible from these transformations. The anti stereoisomer (shown here) and its enantiomer are the ultimate carcinogens from benzo[a]pyrene, but the syn isomers are also produced.

== Biochemistry ==
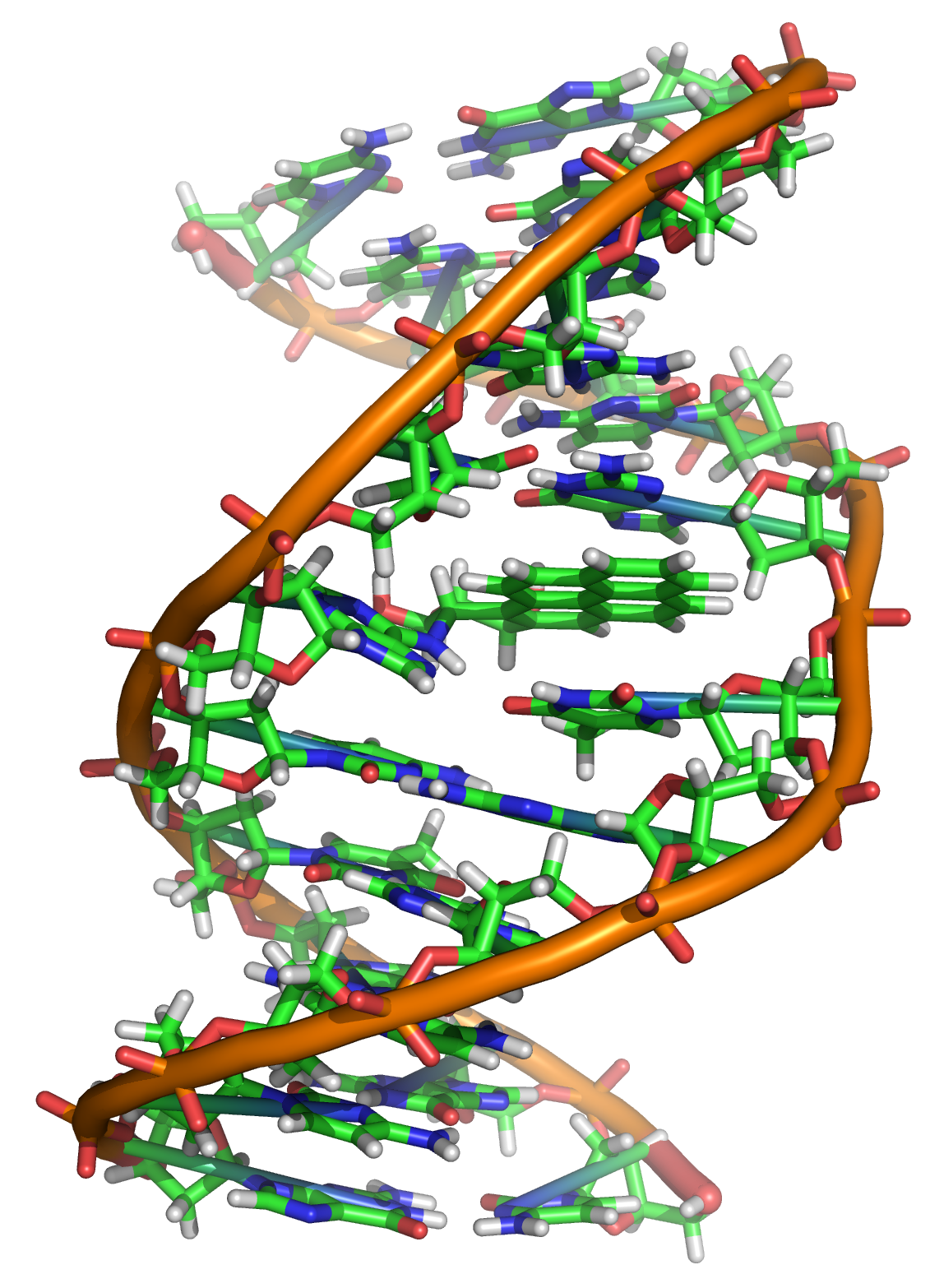
A DNA adduct (at center) of a metabolite of benzo[a]pyrene.

(+)-Benzo[a]pyrene-7,8-dihydrodiol-9,10-epoxide has been shown to bind to an N2 atom of a guanine nucleobase in DNA, distorting the double helix structure by intercalation of the pyrene moiety between base pairs through π-stacking.

There are indications that (+)-benzo[a]pyrene-7,8-dihydrodiol-9,10-epoxide specifically targets the protective p53 gene; More than 50 percent of human tumors contain a mutation or deletion of the p53 gene. This gene is a transcription factor that regulates the cell cycle and hence functions as a tumor suppressor. The anti-benzo[a]pyrene diol epoxides induce guanine to thymine transversions in related areas of p53, thereby inactivating its tumor suppression ability in certain cells, leading to genetic mutations and potentially to cancer.

Induction of CYP1A1 by benzo[a]pyrene occurs via binding to the aryl hydrocarbon receptor in the cytosol, leading the transformed receptor to translocate to the nucleus where it dimerises with aryl hydrocarbon receptor nuclear translocator and then binds xenobiotic response elements in DNA located upstream of certain genes. This process increases transcription of genes including CYP1A1, resulting in increased CYP1A1 protein production. This process is similar to induction of CYP1A1 by certain polychlorinated biphenyls and dioxins. Seemingly, CYP1A1 activity in the intestinal mucosa prevents major amounts of ingested benzo[a]pyrene to enter portal blood and systemic circulation. Intestinal, but not hepatic, expression of CYP1A1 depends on TOLL-like receptor 2 (TLR2), which is a eucaryotic receptor for bacterial surface structures such as lipoteichoic acid. Moreover, benzo[a]pyrene has been found to activate a transposon, LINE1, in humans.
