= Pyrene =

Chemical compound

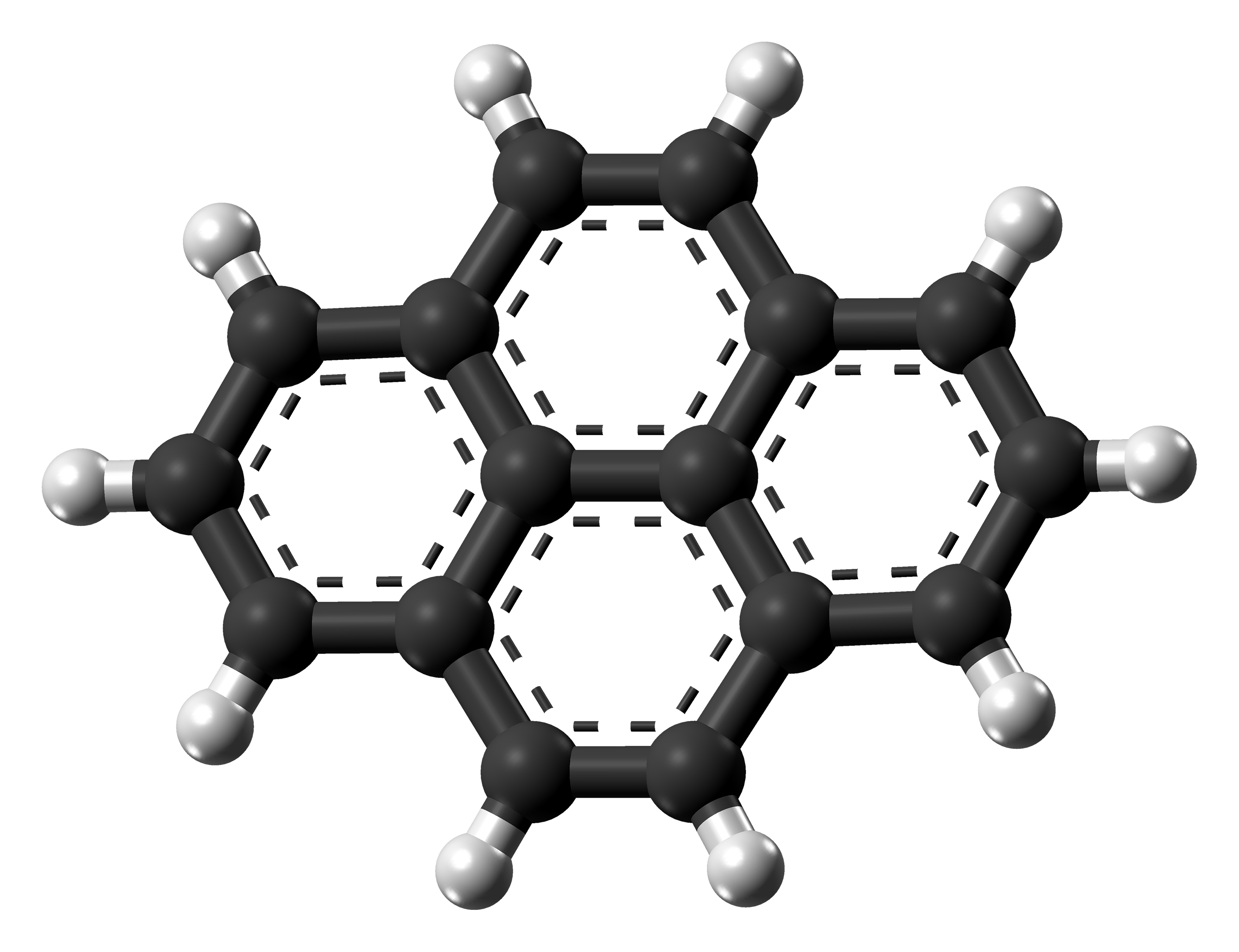

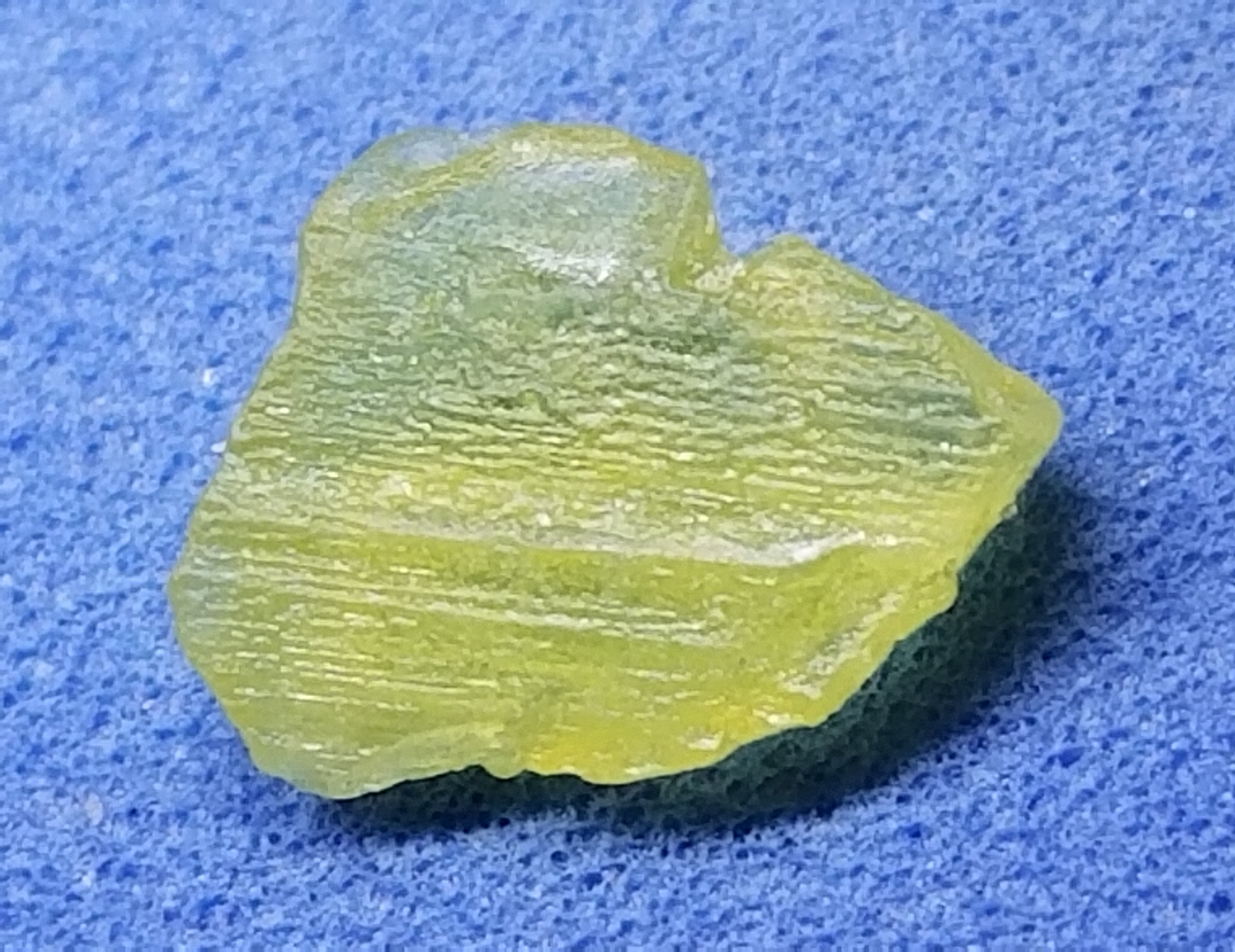

Names
- Preferred IUPAC name Pyrene
- Other names Benzo[def]phenanthrene

Identifiers
CAS Number	129-00-0
3D model (JSmol)	Interactive image
Beilstein Reference	1307225
ChEBI	CHEBI:39106
ChEMBL	ChEMBL279564
ChemSpider	29153
ECHA InfoCard	100.004.481
Gmelin Reference	84203
KEGG	C14335
PubChem CID	31423
RTECS number	UR2450000
UNII	9E0T7WFW93
CompTox Dashboard (EPA)	DTXSID3024289
- InChI: InChI=1S/C16H10/c1-3-11-7-9-13-5-2-6-14-10-8-12(4-1)15(11)16(13)14/h1-10H Key: BBEAQIROQSPTKN-UHFFFAOYSA-N; InChI=1/C16H10/c1-3-11-7-9-13-5-2-6-14-10-8-12(4-1)15(11)16(13)14/h1-10H Key: BBEAQIROQSPTKN-UHFFFAOYAB
- SMILES: c1cc2cccc3c2c4c1cccc4cc3

Properties
Chemical formula	C_{16}H_{10}
Molar mass	202.256 g·mol^{−1}
Appearance	colorless solid (yellow impurities are often found at trace levels in many samples).
Density	1.271 g/cm^{3}
Melting point	150.62 °C (303.12 °F; 423.77 K)
Boiling point	394 °C (741 °F; 667 K)
Solubility in water	0.049 mg/L (0 °C); 0.139 mg/L (25 °C); 2.31 mg/L (75 °C)
log P	5.08
Band gap	2.02 eV
Magnetic susceptibility (χ)	−147·10^{−6} cm^{3}/mol

Structure
Crystal structure	Monoclinic
Space group	P2_{1}/a
Lattice constant	a = 13.64 Å, b = 9.25 Å, c = 8.47 Å α = 90°, β = 100.28°, γ = 90°
Formula units (Z)	4

Thermochemistry
Heat capacity (C)	229.7 J/(K·mol)
Std molar entropy (S^{⦵}_{298})	224.9 J·mol^{−1}·K^{−1}
Std enthalpy of formation (Δ_{f}H^{⦵}_{298})	125.5 kJ·mol^{−1}
Enthalpy of fusion (Δ_{f}H^{⦵}_{fus})	17.36 kJ·mol^{−1}

Hazards
- Occupational safety and health (OHS/OSH)
Main hazards	irritant
- GHS labelling
Pictograms	(GHS07: Exclamation mark) (GHS09: Environmental hazard)
Signal word	Warning
Hazard statements	H315, H319, H335, H410
Precautionary statements	P261, P264, P271, P273, P280, P302+P352, P304+P340, P305+P351+P338, P312, P321, P332+P313, P337+P313, P362, P391, P403+P233, P405, P501
NFPA 704 (fire diamond)	2 1 0
Flash point	non-flammable

Related compounds
Related PAHs	benzopyrene
- Except where otherwise noted, data are given for materials in their standard state (at 25 °C [77 °F], 100 kPa). verify (what is ?) Infobox references

Pyrene is a polycyclic aromatic hydrocarbon (PAH) with the formula C_{16}H_{10}. Consisting of four fused benzene rings, it in a flat aromatic compound. This colorless compound is the smallest peri-fused PAH (one where the rings are fused through more than one face). Pyrene forms during incomplete combustion of organic compounds.

== Occurrence and properties ==
Pyrene was first isolated from coal tar, where it occurs up to 2% by weight. As a peri-fused PAH, pyrene is much more resonance-stabilized than its five-member-ring containing isomer fluoranthene. Therefore, it is produced in a wide range of combustion conditions. For example, automobiles produce about 1 μg/km.

=== Reactions ===
Pyrene contains two kinds of ring subunits: two a-rings with three CH bonds and two b-rings with two CH bonds. The a-rings are more susceptible to reactions with electrophiles and oxidants. The b-rings can be partially hydrogenated to give tetrahydropyrene. Similarly the b-rings can be oxygenated to give the quinone-like derivative C_{16}H_{8}O_{2}

Oxidation with chromate affords perinaphthenone and then naphthalene-1,4,5,8-tetracarboxylic acid. Pyrene undergoes a series of hydrogenation reactions and is susceptible to halogenation, Diels-Alder additions, and nitration, all with varying degrees of selectivity. Bromination occurs at one of the 1-positions.

Reduction with sodium affords the radical anion. From this anion, a variety of pi-arene complexes can be prepared.

Pyrene and its derivatives are used commercially to make dyes and dye precursors, for example pyranine and naphthalene-1,4,5,8-tetracarboxylic acid.

== Photophysics ==
Pyrene has been described as "one of the most studied organic molecules in terms of its photophysical properties ..., by far, the most frequently applied dye in fluorescence labeled polymers". It is an electron donor in some donor-acceptor systems. Its potential as a photocatalyst has also been heavily investigated.

Pyrene was the first molecule for which excimer behavior was discovered. Such excimer appears around 450 nm. Theodor Förster reported this in 1954.

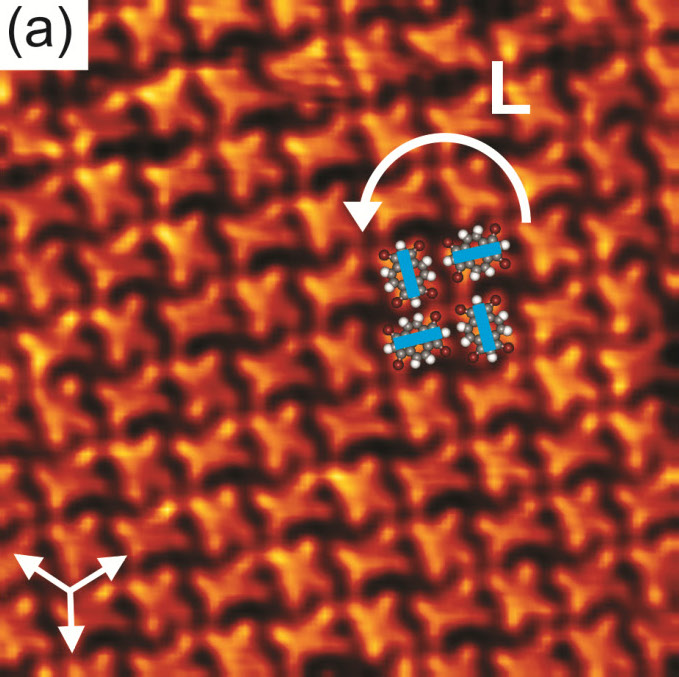

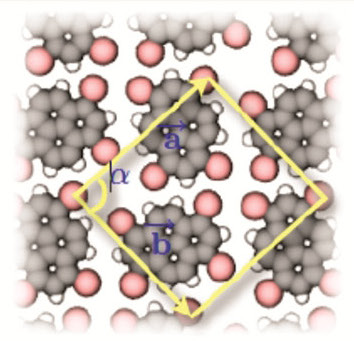
STM image of self-assembled Br_{4}Py molecules on Au(111) surface (top) and its model (bottom; pink spheres are Br atoms).

Pyrene's fluorescence emission spectrum is very sensitive to solvent polarity.

Diagram showing the numbering and ring fusion locations of pyrene according to IUPAC nomenclature of organic chemistry.

== Safety and environmental factors ==
Although it is not as problematic as benzopyrene, animal studies have shown pyrene is toxic to the kidneys and liver. It is now known that pyrene affects several living functions in fish and algae.

Its biodegradation has been heavily examined. The process commences with dihydroxylation at each of two kinds of CH=CH linkages. Experiments in pigs show that urinary 1-hydroxypyrene is a metabolite of pyrene, when given orally.

== See also ==
- List of interstellar and circumstellar molecules
- Perhydropyrene
- Fluoranthene, an isomeric PAH

== Cited sources ==
- Haynes, William M., ed. (2016). CRC Handbook of Chemistry and Physics (97th ed.). CRC Press. ISBN 978-1-4987-5429-3.
