= Fluoranthene =

- Chemical structure of fluoranthene

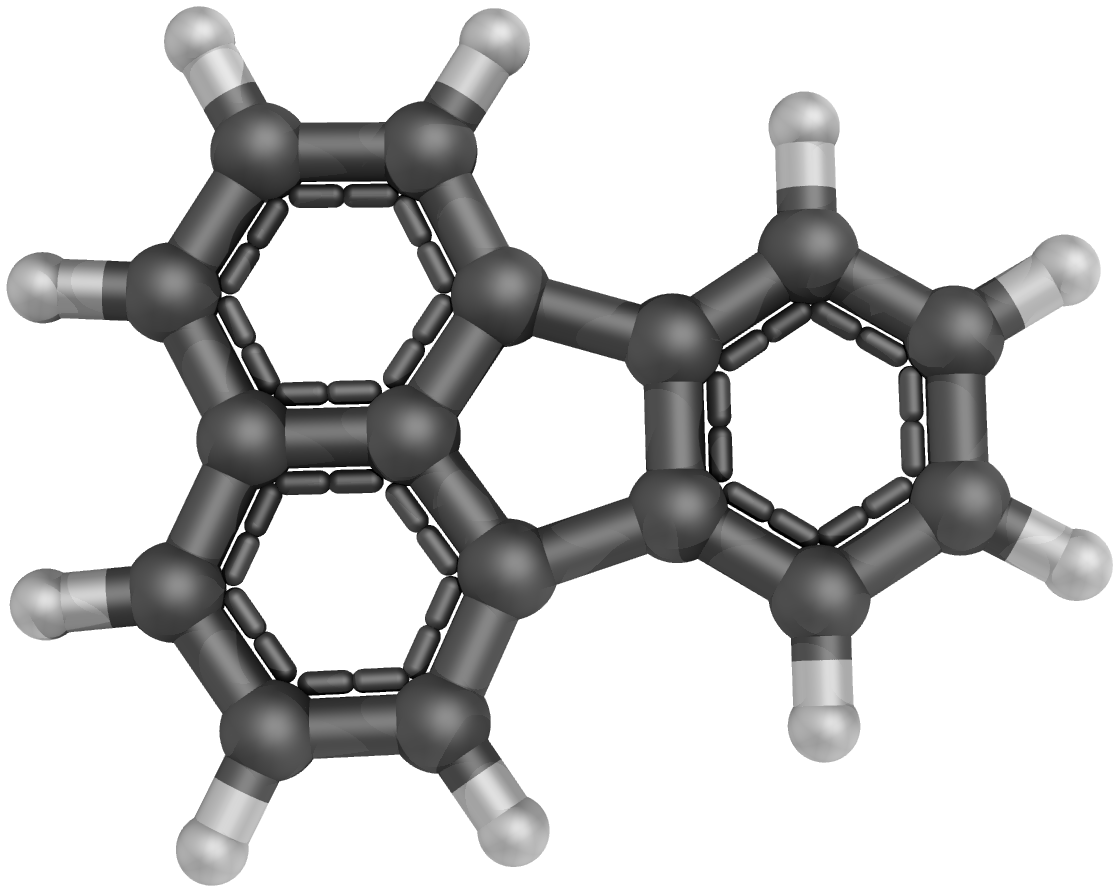
- Ball-and-stick model of fluoranthene

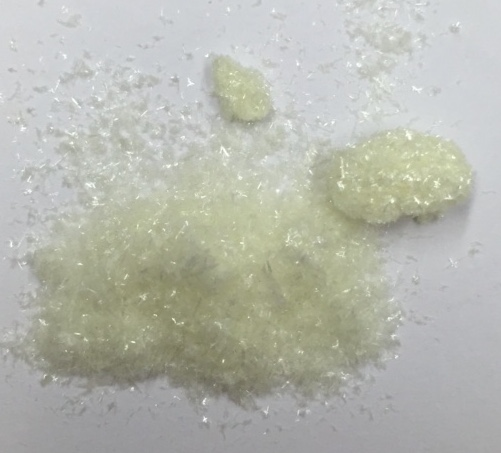

Names
- Preferred IUPAC name Fluoranthene
- Other names Benzo[jk]fluorene; Tetracyclo[7.6.1.0^{5,16}.0^{10,15}]hexadeca-1,3,5,7,9(16),10,12,14-octaene

Identifiers
| CAS Number | 206-44-0 |
| 3D model (JSmol) | Interactive image |
| Beilstein Reference | 1907918 |
| ChEBI | CHEBI:33083 |
| ChEMBL | ChEMBL355014 |
| ChemSpider | 8800 |
| ECHA InfoCard | 100.005.376 |
| EC Number | 205-912-4 |
| Gmelin Reference | 262216 |
| KEGG | C19425 |
| PubChem CID | 9154 |
| UNII | 360UOL779Z |
| UN number | 1325, 3082 |
| CompTox Dashboard (EPA) | DTXSID3024104 |
- InChI: InChI=1S/C16H10/c1-2-8-13-12(7-1)14-9-3-5-11-6-4-10-15(13)16(11)14/h1-10H Key: GVEPBJHOBDJJJI-UHFFFAOYSA-N; InChI=1/C16H10/c1-2-8-13-12(7-1)14-9-3-5-11-6-4-10-15(13)16(11)14/h1-10H Key: GVEPBJHOBDJJJI-UHFFFAOYAL
- SMILES: c1ccc-2c(c1)-c3cccc4c3c2ccc4

Properties
| Chemical formula | C_{16}H_{10} |
| Molar mass | 202.256 g·mol^{−1} |
| Appearance | Yellow to green needles |
| Density | 1.252 g/cm^{3} (0 °C), solid |
| Melting point | 110.8 °C (231.4 °F; 383.9 K) |
| Boiling point | 375 °C (707 °F; 648 K) |
| Solubility in water | 265 μg/L (25 °C) |
| Magnetic susceptibility (χ) | −138.0×10^{−6} cm^{3}/mol |
| Viscosity | 0.652 cP at 20 °C |

Structure
| Molecular shape | Planar |
| Dipole moment | 0.34 D |

Hazards
- GHS labelling
| Pictograms | (GHS07: Exclamation mark) (GHS09: Environmental hazard) |
| Signal word | Warning |
| Hazard statements | H302, H410 |
| Precautionary statements | P273, P501 |
| Flash point | 210 °C (410 °F; 483 K) |

Related compounds
- Except where otherwise noted, data are given for materials in their standard state (at 25 °C [77 °F], 100 kPa). verify (what is ?) Infobox references

Fluoranthene is a polycyclic aromatic hydrocarbon (PAH). The molecule can be viewed as the fusion of naphthalene and benzene unit connected by a five-membered ring. The chemical formula is C_{16}H_{10}. Although samples are often pale yellow, the compound is colorless. It is soluble in nonpolar organic solvents. It is a member of the class of PAHs known as non-alternant PAHs because it has rings other than those with six carbon atoms. It is a structural isomer of the alternant PAH pyrene. It is not as thermodynamically stable as pyrene. Its name is derived from its fluorescence under UV light.

== Occurrence ==
Traces of fluoranthene is found in many combustion products, along with other PAHs. It results from incomplete combustion. Fluoranthene was originally isolated from coal tar pitch. It is still obtained from the high boiling fraction of coal tar, representing a few percent by weight.

=== Pollutant ===
Fluoranthene is one of the U.S. Environmental Protection Agency's 16 priority pollutant PAHs. Fluoranthene has been classified by the International Agency for Research on Cancer as a group 3 carcinogen, "not classifiable as to its carcinogenicity to humans", however it was found to possess carcinogenic properties in case of newborn mice according to short-term lung tumor assay (Busby et al., 1984). In 2019, fluoranthene was added to the Candidate List of Substances of Very High Concern (SVHCs) due to its persistent, bioaccumulative and toxic (PBT) and very persistent and very bioaccumulative (vPvB) properties. Its occurrence in food has been assessed.

Its biodegradation has been elucidated. The process commences with dihydroxylation at each of two kinds of CH=CH linkages.

== Applications ==
- Rmi-9563 [63908-14-5]
- Florantyrone
- DEAP fluoranthene [27086-86-8]
- RMI 11645DA [64296-50-0]
