= Glossary of dyeing terms =

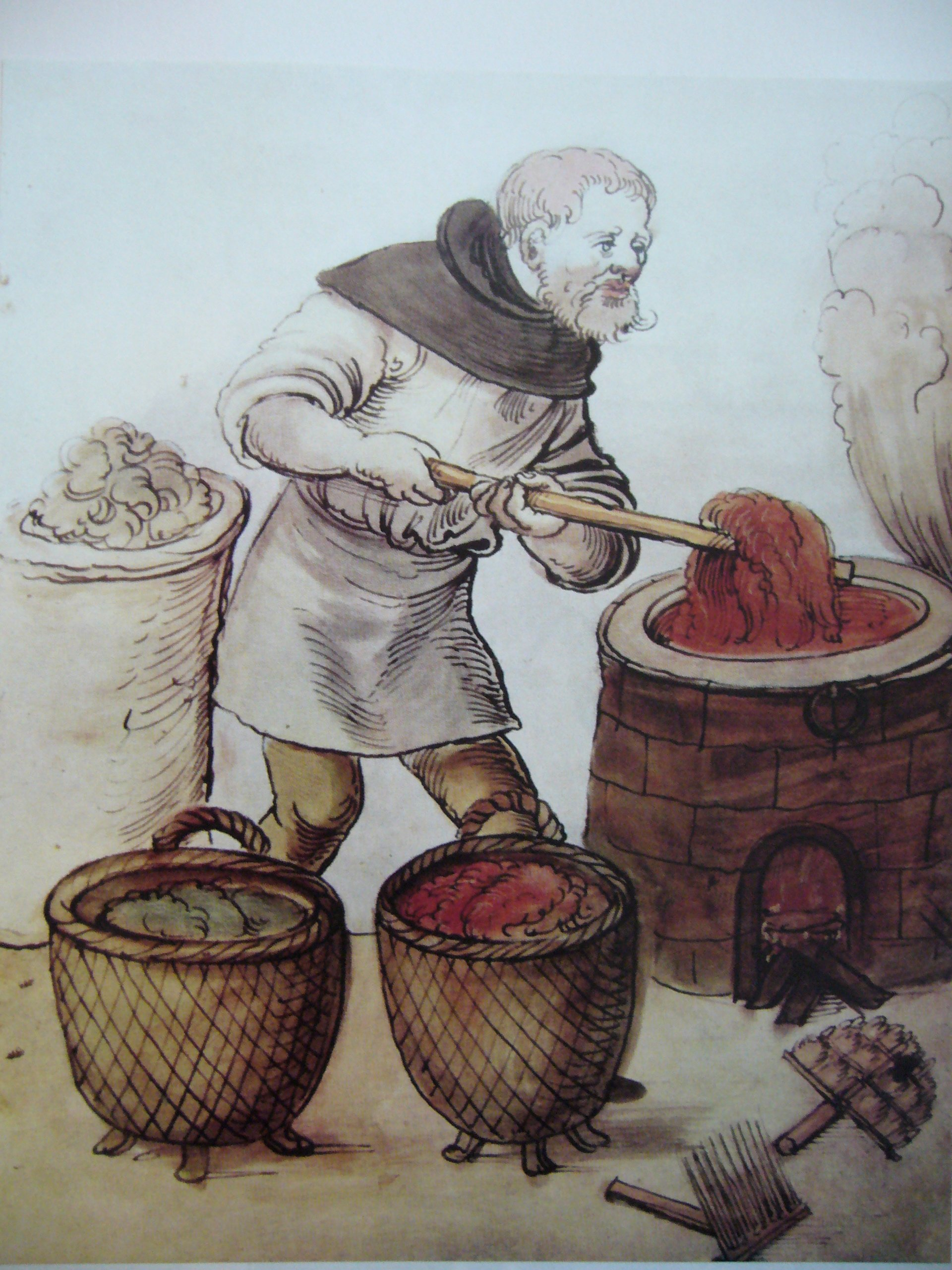
Dyeing in the Middle Ages.

This glossary contains terms specific to dyeing. For terms used in the creation or manufacturing of textiles, including spinning, knitting, weaving, and individual fabrics and finishing processes, see Glossary of textile manufacturing. For terms used in sewing and tailoring, see Glossary of sewing terms. For biological and medical applications of dyeing, see Staining and Biological Stain Commission.

Dyeing is the craft of imparting colors to textiles in loose fiber, yarn, cloth or garment form by treatment with a dye. Archaeologists have found evidence of textile dyeing with natural dyes dating back to the Neolithic period. In China, dyeing with plants, barks and insects has been traced back more than 5,000 years. Natural insect dyes such as Tyrian purple and kermes and plant-based dyes such as woad, indigo and madder were important elements of the economies of Asia and Europe until the discovery of man-made synthetic dyes in the mid-19th century. Synthetic dyes quickly superseded natural dyes for the large-scale commercial textile production enabled by the Industrial Revolution, but natural dyes remained in use by traditional cultures around the world.

== A ==
aal
Aal or Indian mulberry (Morinda tinctoria) is the source of the morindone dye sold under the trade name "Suranji". It is extensively cultivated in India for the dyeing of cotton, silk and wool in shades of red, chocolate or purple, dependent on the mordant used.
adjective
Adjective dyes are those dyes that require use of a mordant to bind the color to the fiber.
alkanet
Alkanet or dyer's bugloss (Alkanna tinctoria) is a traditional plant source of red dye.
alum
Alum (aluminum sulfate) is a naturally occurring basic mordant widely used in the ancient world.
añil
Añil (Indigofera suffruticosa) is an indigo dye-bearing plant of Central and South America.
aniline
Aniline dyes or basic dyes are a class of synthetic dyes derived from coal tar, first discovered in the 19th century. These dyes produce brilliant colors that work well with animal fibers, especially silk. Because of poor colorfastness, aniline dyes are seldom used with textiles today.
archil
Archil is a dye produced from the lichen Roccella tinctoria which also produces cudbear and litmus.

== B ==
bloodroot
Bloodroot (Sanguinaria canadensis) is a flowering plant native to eastern North America; its root is the source for a red dye used by Native Americans.
brazilwood
Brazilwood is a red-brown dye from either of two related trees. The original brazilwood, sappan wood (Caesalpinia sappan), is native to India and was exported to China by 900 BCE and to Europe via the Muslim world by the Early Middle Ages. Portuguese explorers discovered a similar tree growing in the New World and named the surrounding country Brazil. This tree is the Brazilwood (Caesalpinia echinata) used by contemporary craft dyers.
black walnut
Black walnut (Juglans nigra) is a North American tree used to produce a deep brown dye approaching black.

== C ==
carmine
Carmine is a crimson-colored dye derived from cochineal (Dactylopius coccus), a scale insect of Central and North America.
cochineal
Cochineal (Dactylopius coccus) is a scale insect of Central and North America from which the crimson-coloured dye carmine is derived.
colorfast
Colorfast dyes are dyes resistant to shifts in hue, fading, or bleeding (transfer of dye) when wet.
copperas
Copperas is the dyer's name for ferrous sulfate, an iron mordant used to sadden or reduce the saturation of colors.
crimson
Crimson is a deep red dye or color derived from the word kermes.
crottle
Crottle is a traditional Scottish dye derived from lichens of the genus Parmelia, Parmelia saxatilis and Parmelia omphalodes, which give deep red- or purple-brown and rusty orange respectively. These lichens are the origin of the distinctive scent of naturally dyed Harris Tweed.
cudbear
Cudbear is a purple dye from the lichen Roccella tinctoria which also produces archil and litmus. Cudbear is one of the few natural dyes to be credited to a named individual, Dr Cuthbert Gordon of Scotland, who patented the process of its production in 1758.
cutch
Cutch is an ancient brown dye from the wood of acacia trees, particularly Acacia catechu, used in India for dyeing cotton. Cutch gives gray-browns with an iron mordant and olive-browns with copper.

== D ==
direct dye
Same as substantive.
dye
Dyes are color-bearing organic compounds that can be dissolved in water or another liquid so that they will penetrate fibers.
dyebath
A dyebath is a solution of dye and water or other liquid in which textiles are dyed.
dyed in the wool
Dyed in the wool or dyed in the fleece refers to fibers that are dyed prior to spinning. Compare to dyed in the hank or yarn-dyed; piece-dyed (dyed after weaving); and garment-dyed, dyed after sewing or knitting.
dyer's broom
Dyer's broom (Genista tinctoria), also known as dyer's greenweed or dyer's greenwood, is a garden plant used to produce yellow dyes.
dyer's bugloss
Dyer's bugloss (Alkanna tinctoria) is the source of the red dye alkanet.
dyer's knotweed
Dyer's knotweed (Polygonum tinctorum) is an indigo-bearing dye plant native to Japan and the coasts of China.
dyer's mulberry tree
Dyer's mulberry tree (Maclura tinctoria) is a New World tree from which the dye old fustic is derived.
dyer's rocket
Same as weld.
dyestuff
Dyestuff is any raw material that releases a dye.
dyeworks
A dyeworks, dye-works, or dye works is a workshop for dyeing fiber, yarn, or cloth.

== F ==
fast
Same as colorfast
fugitive
Fugitive colors are prone to fading when exposed to sunlight (fugitive to light) or washing, as opposed to colorfast.
fustic
Fustic or old fustic is a brilliant yellow dye derived from the inner bark of the dyer's mulberry tree Maclura tinctoria of the West Indies and Mexico.

== G ==
gall nut
Gall nuts, nutgalls or oak apples are a tannin-rich growth on oak trees produced by an infection of the insect Cynips gallae tinctoriae, used as a dye and a mordant. Commercial gall nuts are harvested from the Gall Oak (Quercus lusitanica), also called Lusitanian Oak or Dyer's Oak, native to Morocco, Portugal, and Spain.
garment-dyed
Dyed after sewing or knitting.
grain
Grain was the Medieval word for the red insect dye kermes. Dyed in the grain refers to dyed with kermes, or kermes in combination with another dye, producing colors such as crimson in grain, violet in grain.

== I ==
Indian madder
Indian madder or munjeet (Rubia cordifolia) is native to the Himalayas and other mountains of Asia and Japan. Munjeet was an important dye for the Asian cotton industry and is still used by craft dyers in Nepal.
indigo
Indigo is a deep blue derived from any of the indigo dye-bearing plants, primarily those in the genus Indigofera, especially true indigo (Indigofera tinctoria, also known as Indigofera sumatrana).

== K ==
Kendal green
Kendal green is a coarse gray-green woolen cloth created by mordanting wool in alum, dyeing it yellow with dyer's broom, and then overdyeing the cloth blue with woad (or later, indigo). It is named for Kendal, Cumbria (formerly part of Westmorland) where the cloth was made from the Middle Ages.
kermes
Kermes is a natural dye derived from the dried unlaid eggs of the females of a scale insect in the genus Kermes, primarily Kermes vermilio, distantly related to the cochineal insect, and found on species of oak (especially Kermes oak) near the Mediterranean.

== L ==
Lincoln green
Lincoln green is a warm olive green dye produced in Lincoln in the Middle Ages, made by dyeing wool blue with woad, then overdyeing it yellow with weld or dyers' broom.
logwood
Logwood (Haematoxylum campechianum) is a dyewood native to Mexico and Central America which produces a fast black in combination with a ferrous sulfate (copperas) mordant. Despite changing fashions in color, logwood was the most widely used dye by the 19th century, providing the sober blacks of formal and mourning clothes.

== M ==
madder
Madder (rubia tinctoria) and related plants of the Rubia family are a source of good red dyes containing alizarin and purpurin. Madder was a dye of commercial importance in Europe, being cultivated in the Netherlands and France until the market collapsed following the development of synthetic alizarin dye in 1869.
mauveine
Mauveine or aniline purple was the first synthetic organic chemical dye.
mignonette
Same as weld.
mordant
A mordant is a chemical used in combination with dye to "fix" the color in the textile fibers. By using different mordants, dyers can often obtain a variety of colors and shades from the same dye.
munjeet
Same as Indian madder.

== N ==
natal indigo
Natal indigo (Indigofera arrecta) is an indigo dye-bearing plant of Africa, but chiefly cultivated in India.
natural dye
Natural dyes are dyes derived from animals, plants, minerals, fungi and lichens.
nutgall
Same as gall nut.

== O ==
oak gall
Same as gall nut.
ochre
Ochre is an iron oxide pigment from clay that can be used to dye textiles a ruddy or reddish-brown color. Evidence of textile dyeing with ochre has been dated to the Neolithic.

== P ==
Phoenician red
Phoenician red is a red dye related to Tyrian purple or royal purple, extracted from several genera of sea snails, primarily Murex brandaris the spiny dye-murex (currently known as Bolinus brandaris).
pigment
Pigments are insoluble color particles that may be attached to the surface of cloth using a binding agent. Solutions of binders and pigments are called pigment dyes.
Polish cochineal
Polish cochineal or Polish grains is a crimson dye colloquially known as "Saint John's blood", produced in Eastern Europe during the Middle Ages from the scale insect Porphyrophora polonica.
potash
Potash (potassium carbonate) is a common mordant made by leaching wood ashes and evaporating the solution.
prepared for dyeing
A fabric or garment which is prepared for dyeing, abbreviated PFD, is specially made to be dyed. PFD fabrics have been desized, scoured, and fully bleached, but have been processed without optical brighteners or softeners which can interfere with dye uptake.
puccoon
Same as bloodroot.

== Q ==
quercitron
Quercitron is a mustard yellow natural dye obtained from the bark of the Eastern Black Oak (Quercus velutina), a forest tree indigenous in North America.

== R ==
reactive dye
Reactive dyes are a class of synthetic dyes that first appeared commercially in 1956, after their invention in 1954 by Rattee and Stephens at the Imperial Chemical Industries Dyestuffs Division site in the United Kingdom. Reactive dyes are used primarily to dye natural fibers and cellulose fibers such as rayon.
resist dyeing
Resist dyeing and the related resist printing are terms for a number of traditional methods of dyeing textiles with patterns. Methods are used to "resist" or prevent the dye from reaching all the cloth, thereby creating a pattern and ground. The most common forms use wax, some type of paste, or a mechanical resist that manipulates the cloth such as tying or stitching. Resist techniques include screen printing, tie-dye, ikat, and batik.
royal purple
Tyrian purple or royal purple is a purple-red dye which is extracted from several genera of sea snails, primarily Murex brandaris the spiny dye-murex (currently known as Bolinus brandaris). Murex dye was greatly prized in antiquity because it did not fade, rather it became brighter and more intense with weathering and sunlight.
rubia
Rubia is a genus of plants that are sources of the red dye madder.

== S ==
safflower
Safflower (Carthamus tinctorius) is a flowering plant native to Asia that produces a substantive yellow dye for natural fibers. Dried safflower blossoms can be used to produce yellow, mustard, khaki, olive green and red colors. Cotton tape dyed red with safflower was formerly used to tie up government papers in Britain, giving rise to the term red tape.
saffron
Saffron is a spice derived from the flower of the saffron crocus (Crocus sativus) that produces a golden-yellow carotenoid dye called crocin.
Saint John's Blood
Saint John's Blood is a colloquial name for Polish cochineal.
Saxon blue
Saxon blue or Saxony blue is an 18th century dye made from a solution of indigo in concentrated sulfuric acid.
Saxon green
Saxon green or Saxony green is a bright green dye of the 18th century produced using indigo and fustic.
substantive
Substantive dyes are dyes that produce color without the use of a mordant. Examples include indigo dye and archil.
sumac(h)
Various species of sumac or sumach, especially Elm-Leaved Sumach (Rhus coriaria) or Tanner's Sumach of southern Europe and Staghorn Sumac (Rhus typhina) of eastern North America, are rich sources of tannins and are used as dyes and mordants.

== T ==
tannin
Tannin from oak bark or gall nuts is used as a mordant.
tin
Stannous chloride, a metallic salt of tin, is used as a mordant to brighten colors.
Turkey red
Turkey red was a strong, very fast red dye for cotton obtained from madder root via a complicated multistep process involving "sumac and oak galls, calf's blood, sheep's dung, oil, soda, alum, and a solution of tin." Turkey red was developed in India and spread to Turkey. Greek workers familiar with the methods of its production were brought to France in 1747, and Dutch and English spies soon discovered the secret. A sanitized version of Turkey red was being produced in Manchester by 1784.
Tyrian purple
Tyrian purple or royal purple is a purple-red dye which is extracted from several genera of sea snails, primarily Murex brandaris the spiny dye-murex (currently known as Bolinus brandaris). Murex dye was greatly prized in antiquity because it did not fade, rather it became brighter and more intense with weathering and sunlight.

== W ==
weld
Weld (Reseda luteola), also called mignonette or dyer's rocket, was an important yellow dye of the ancient Mediterranean and Europe.
woad
Woad (Isatis tinctoria) is an indigo dye-bearing indigenous plant of Assyria and the Levant which has been grown in Northern Europe over 2,000 years as a source of blue dye. Woad was carried to New England in the 17th century and used extensively in America until native stands of indigo were discovered in Florida and the Carolinas.

== Y ==
young fustic
Young fustic is a yellow dye derived from the wood of the Eurasian smoketree (Cotinus coggygria).

== See also ==
- List of dyes
