= Cold pad batch =

Method of dyeing

Cold pad batch (CPB) is a method of dyeing textiles, typically cellulosic fibers such as cotton, in which the textile is impregnated with dye in a cold state, rather than being heated. High dye fixation and no thermal energy are the advantages of the CPB process. CPB-dyed fabrics are less expensive, have a softer hand feel, and have a cleaner surface than exhaust dyed materials. The process may take up to 12 hours in the batching process, depending on the depth of the shade. The disadvantage is that batching is a time-consuming and lengthy process. The process was developed in 1960.

During the dyeing process, the dye must become close and even with the material in order to produce a uniform color that is fast to moisture, heat, and light. Due to their superior fastness properties and simple application, reactive dyes are currently the most common type of dye for cotton dyeing. The CPB technique uses less water and energy. This approach eliminates the typical salt used to exhaust reactive dyes and provides good dye fixation.

== Pad dyeing ==
Fabrics are typically dyed after being manufactured through a process known as piece-dyeing, the technique involves immersion of the fabric in a dye bath. However, pad-dyeing was invented to accelerate the dyeing process without necessarily lowering costs. This process involves feeding the fabric to be dyed through a machine equipped with dye baths and rubber rollers. The fabric passes over rollers, immerses into a dye bath, and then proceeds through rollers that remove excess dye, allowing it to return to the dye container. The difference between piece-dyeing in a vat and using a pad-dyeing machine is that in the latter, the fabric is continuously moved through one or more dye baths, rather than being stationary in a vat until it is fully saturated.

== CPB process ==
The method exploits the properties of reactive dyes, which are also applicable at room temperature. Cotton can be dyed with a variety of dyes, although reactive dye is the most prevalent. Active groups in these dyes form covalent bonds with cotton's hydroxy groups through substitution and/or addition. The CPB method doesn't use salt or energy to dye, which makes it easier to use, less expensive, and more environmentally friendly than alternative methods.

CPB is a semi-continuous process that uses a padding mangle to pad the fabric with dye liquor and a suitable alkali [for reaction and fixing]. After the roll is padded, it is immediately wound and wrapped. It is then batched or rotated continuously for 6–24 hours. This process is known as "pad-batch." The material is then washed to remove the unfixed dye, which is possible to do with a continuous washing line or a batch dyeing machine.

=== Prerequisites and equipment ===
1. RFD (ready-to-dye) fabric and the recipe for desired color pH of pad liquor 11–12.
2. Padding mangle.
3. Batching Stations.
4. Washing arrangement.

==== Precaution ====
Dyes selection is important in CPB, dyes should be compatible with pad bath (alkali) stability, moderately reactive, and less substantive.

== Comparison with exhaust dyeing ==
The textile industry is a water-intensive industry that significantly strains the world's water supply. In exhaust dyeing, the ratio of textile to liquor has the most effect on how much water is used. If the liquor ratio is changed from 1:10 to 1:8, 20% less water is used and 15% less money is spent on processing. Low-liquor ratio dyeing machines not only use less water to dye textiles, but they also use less salt and alkali because they add these things in grammes per liter of the total liquor. Lowering the amount of liquor also aids dye absorption. Compared to exhaust dyeing, padding methods give the lowest liquor-to-fiber ratio in the dyebath, lesser volumes of leftover dyebath solution, faster dye application, easier control over dye levelness on the cloth, and no electrolyte is required.

=== Savings ===
Padding-based dyeing methods for cotton fabrics are the most preferred coloring technique from a sustainability perspective. The cold pad batch method conserves water. The cold-pad batch method uses half the amount of water needed to dye cotton with reactive dye. Higher energy costs are an indirect effect of excessive water consumption in dyeing and finishing, as more energy is required to heat larger quantities of water to the dyeing temperature. About 24.9% of all the thermal energy used in a dyeing plant is lost in the wastewater.

== Sustainability ==
The bleaching, dyeing, printing, and finishing stages of the textile industry are mostly to blame because they use water as their main medium to put dyes and chemicals on textiles. In the last few decades, it has become an increasingly important part of a dyer's job to think about how dyes and processes affect the environment. A huge amount of fresh water is used and polluted by the textile wet processing industry. Consumers are becoming more aware of environmental issues, environmental laws are getting stricter about effluents from the textile industry, and there is not enough water in some parts of the world. All of these things have forced the textile industry to look at how much water it uses and how dangerous its effluents are. Two very promising ways to save water are to use supercritical carbon dioxide (SC-CO_{2}) to dye without water and low liquor ratio machines in textile wet processing. Both options have challenges, including cost and the modification of traditional dye factories.

The industry has predominantly used reactive dyes to color knitted cotton goods. The treatment of salt-laden, colored effluent generated by the dyeing process is one of the industry's primary concerns.

The cold pad batch process is economical as well as ecologically sustainable. There is no use of salt, which is an inevitability in other exhaust applications of reactive dyes. The three other parameters represent significant savings, i.e., water, energy, and dyes and chemicals.

=== Study ===
While identifying the "best available techniques," or the best type of process technology, the researchers examine how process technologies for textile dyeing might be evaluated from the perspective of preventive environmental protection. They looked at how the latest generation of textile dyeing technologies compared to the previous generation in terms of the preventive environmental protection goals of reducing the amount of resources used and the amount of waste and emissions made.

The study, "Comparative Assessment of Textile Dyeing Technologies from a Preventive Environmental Protection Point of View," found that the padding process, with the recent technology, could be used to meet both goals more effectively in five of the seven situations studied.

== See also ==
- Winch dyeing machine
- Mangle (machine)
