= Ring dyeing =

Type of fault in fiber dyeing

Ring dyeing is a type of dyeing fault in which dyes are partially diffused to the interior of fibre. Most dyes are stained on to the fibre surface that form layer of dyes on to fibre surface. Thus around the fibre a ring-like appearance of the dye can be viewed cross-sectionally. This ring-like dye layer opposes further dye diffusion. This problem leads to poor wash fastness and rubbing fastness of dyed fabric, as well as other staining-related fastness properties.

The dye particles are not penetrated uniformly throughout the fibre structure due to several reasons, like poor pre-treatment of yarn before dyeing, channeling of dye liquor circulation due to faulty loading of carriers with yarn wound packages, high density of packages (especially in cheese/cone dyeing), and many more.

Ring dyeing can happen by accident, but sometimes it is a desired effect sought out by dyers. One example of this is blue jeans (dyed with indigo) that are intentionally dyed so that the blue color will fade more quickly.
