= M. tinctoria =

M. tinctoria may refer to:

- Maclura tinctoria, the old fustic, a medium to large tree species found from Mexico to Argentina
- Morinda tinctoria, the aal or Indian mulberry, a plant species

== See also ==
- Tinctoria
