= Winch dyeing machine =

Type of dyeing machine

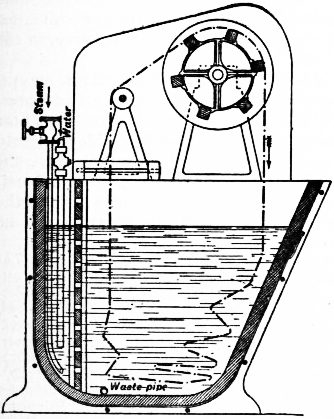
Winch dyeing machine

A winch dyeing machine, or a winch machine, is a type of dyeing machine suitable for piece dyeing. A winch is a simple machine. It is equipped with a winch to guide the fabric from the vat. It has a straight front and a curved back. Long lengths are pulled over the winch and sewn together to form an endless rope. The winch dyeing machine allows fabric ropes pulled from the front and dropping back into the dye liquor. The winch or beck dyeing machine is one of the oldest forms.

== Principle and parameters ==
A winch machine is a high liquor dyeing machine operating at 1:20 (MLR) and a maximum temperature of 98 degrees Celsius. In a winch dyeing, the fabric remains in movement while the dye liquor stays stationary similar to a jigger but with lesser stress on the materials. Hence, suitable for delicate textures and fabric types such as knitted fabrics. Chemicals and dyes dosed in the front portion that travels and get mixed in the entire vat. According to the size of the machine many numbers of ropes are dyed together by playing several cycles in the dye liquor.

== See also ==
- Batch dyeing
- Color of clothing
- Cold pad batch
