= Morindin =

Names
- IUPAC name 1,5-Dihydroxy-2-methyl-6-[β-D-xylopyranosyl-(1→6)-β-D-glucopyranosyloxy]anthracene-9,10-dione
- Systematic IUPAC name 1,5-Dihydroxy-2-methyl-6-{[(2S,3R,4S,5S,6R)-3,4,5-trihydroxy-6-({[(2S,3R,4S,5R)-3,4,5-trihydroxyoxan-2-yl]oxy}methyl)oxan-2-yl]oxy}anthracene-9,10-dione
- Other names Morindone 6-beta-primeveroside

Identifiers
CAS Number	60450-21-7
3D model (JSmol)	Interactive image
ChemSpider	133633
PubChem CID	151621
UNII	D56N4L816F
CompTox Dashboard (EPA)	DTXSID60209193
- InChI: InChI=1S/C26H28O14/c1-8-2-3-9-14(16(8)28)17(29)10-4-5-12(20(32)15(10)18(9)30)39-26-24(36)22(34)21(33)13(40-26)7-38-25-23(35)19(31)11(27)6-37-25/h2-5,11,13,19,21-28,31-36H,6-7H2,1H3/t11-,13-,19+,21-,22+,23-,24-,25+,26-/m1/s1 Key: UVLAQGRQOILFBG-UHCLWRNRSA-N
- SMILES: CC1=C(C2=C(C=C1)C(=O)C3=C(C2=O)C=CC(=C3O)OC4C(C(C(C(O4)COC5C(C(C(CO5)O)O)O)O)O)O)O

Properties
Chemical formula	C_{26}H_{28}O_{14}
Molar mass	564.5 g·mol^{−1}
- Except where otherwise noted, data are given for materials in their standard state (at 25 °C [77 °F], 100 kPa). Infobox references

Morindin is an anthraquinone glycoside present in several Morinda species, especially M. tinctoria (the Indian mulberry tree) and M. citrifolia (noni). Chemical or enzymatic hydrolysis of morindin yields its bright red aglycone, morindone.

The structure and formula of morindin were first elucidated by Thomas Edward Thorpe and T. H. Greenall in 1887.
