= Morindone =

- Skeletal formula of morindone

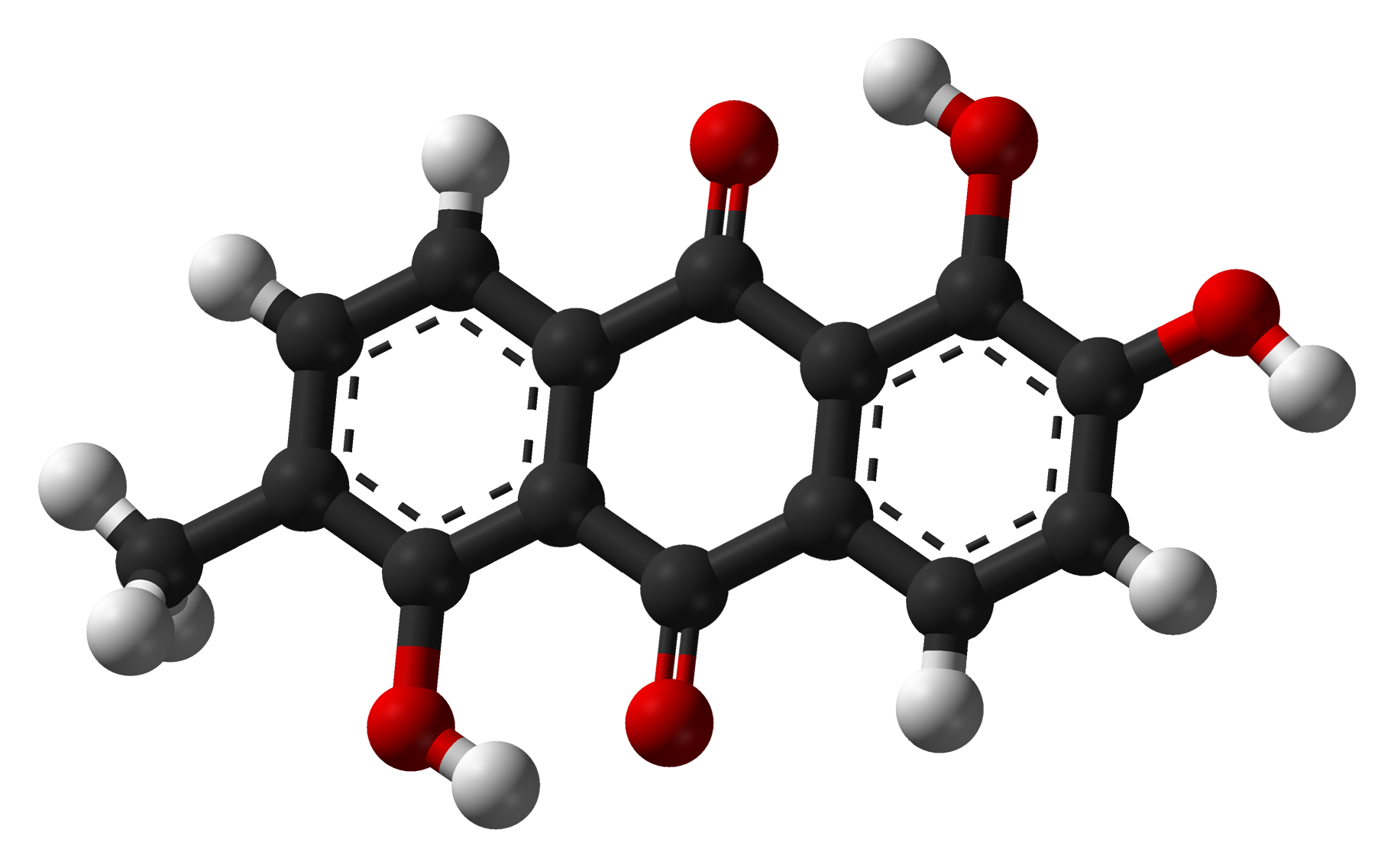
- Ball-and-stick model of morindone

Names
- Preferred IUPAC name 1,2,5-Trihydroxy-6-methylanthracene-9,10-dione
- Other names Morindone

Identifiers
CAS Number	478-29-5
3D model (JSmol)	Interactive image
ChemSpider	391097
ECHA InfoCard	100.107.333
PubChem CID	442756
UNII	PB6GBU5T6V
CompTox Dashboard (EPA)	DTXSID80197280
- InChI: InChI=1S/C15H10O5/c1-6-2-3-7-10(12(6)17)13(18)8-4-5-9(16)15(20)11(8)14(7)19/h2-5,16-17,20H,1H3 Key: BATFHSIVMJJJAF-UHFFFAOYSA-N; InChI=1/C15H10O5/c1-6-2-3-7-10(12(6)17)13(18)8-4-5-9(16)15(20)11(8)14(7)19/h2-5,16-17,20H,1H3 Key: BATFHSIVMJJJAF-UHFFFAOYAG
- SMILES: O=C2c1c(ccc(c1O)C)C(=O)c3c2ccc(O)c3O

Properties
Chemical formula	C_{15}H_{10}O_{5}
Molar mass	270.2369 g/mol
Appearance	red needle-like crystals
- Except where otherwise noted, data are given for materials in their standard state (at 25 °C [77 °F], 100 kPa). verify (what is ?) Infobox references

Morindone is an anthraquinone compound obtained from various Morinda species, especially M. tinctoria, but also M. citrifolia. Its principal use is as a dye, but it has also been investigated for anticancer and microbial uses.

== Preparation ==
Morindone is obtained from the root bark of M. tinctoria or related species in two stages. In the first step, small roots of immature plants are boiled in alcohol to obtain morindin, a yellowish substance which can also be used in dyeing. Further heating brings about hydrolysis of two glucose monomers through sublimation, leaving intensely red crystals.

M. tinctoria is extensively grown in India for commercial production. Moridin content in the roots peaks in two to three years and drops off considerably after that; some attempts have been made to speed up production using tissue cultures.

== Use as a dye ==
Morindone requires a mordant, and the color obtained varies depending on the substance used. Aluminum mordants give a red color, while iron and chromium produce duskier shades. The traditional mordant used in Java, jirak bark (Symplocos fasciculata), is rich in aluminum salts.

Compared to modern dyestuffs, morindone is not as fast or as stable. Since it can be readily cultivated, however, interest in it remains high. Recent research has examined cell culture as a means of increasing yields.
