= Medley cloth =

Woollen cloth made with mixed dyed fleece in two or more colors

Medley cloth or Medleys or Medley Spanish cloth was a woollen cloth made with mixed dyed fleece in two or more colors. The process comprises the mixing of wool of two or several colors in different proportions before spinning. It was practiced in the 17th century in England. Since the wool was imported from Spain, Medleys were also called Spanish cloth. The known production cities were Westbury, Wiltshire and Trowbridge.

== Properties ==
Medley was a newer cloth of that time, and it was relatively a lighter woolen variety.
