= Batch dyeing =

Textile dyeing method

Batch dyeing (exhaust dyeing) is a method of dyeing a textile material. The method involves the gradual transfer of dye from a dye bath to the textile material in the same piece of equipment. The various methods of batch dyeing result from the type of machine used in the dyeing process. Common machinery used in the batch dyeing process include the jigger dyeing machine, winch dyeing machine, jet dyeing machine and beam dyeing machine.

== Principles ==
The principle of batch dyeing is the migration of dye molecules from the dye solution into the piece of fabric. This is done until the fabric reaches full exhaustion, all within the same 'batch'. The time taken as well as the depth of colour achieved in the batch dyeing process is dependent upon the different control factors of the process. These influencing factors are typically the temperature of the dye liquor, the specific liquor ratio and the method of agitation used. The specific liquor ratio is the ratio between the weight of the fabric being dyed and the volume of the dye solution. The method of agitation depends on the batch dyeing machine that is being used. There are three different forms of agitation used in batch dyeing. Method one is circulation of the fabric only. Method two is the circulation of the dye solution, but the piece of fabric remains stationary. Finally, method three involves both the fabric and the dye solution being circulated simultaneously to create agitation.

== Machines ==
=== Jigger dyeing machine ===
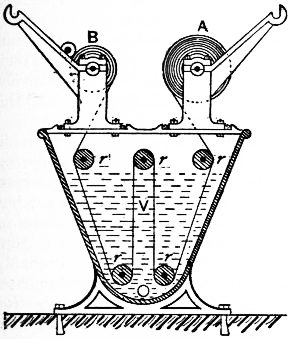
Diagram of a Jigger Dyeing Machine

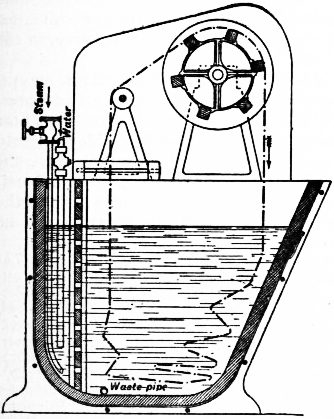
Diagram of a Winch Dyeing Machine

The jigger dyeing machine is a large closed dye vat with two main rollers located in the top half of the machine. The fabric is wound onto one roller and then fed onto the other. The dye liquor is located at the bottom of the dye vat below the two main rollers, it is specially designed to require a low liquor ratio. A number of smaller rollers are located through the dye liquor to guide the fabric through the solution. These are referred to as guide rollers. A steam heating coil is located at the base of the dye vat and is used to control the heating of the dye liquor. Having the dye vat closed also controls the temperature of the dye solution, keeping it a constant temperature at the top and bottom of the vat as no heat is lost to the outside atmosphere. To prevent the dripping of condensation created from the trapped steam, there are special steam coils located at the hood of the machine.

=== Winch dyeing machine ===
The winch dyeing machine is a large dye vat that has a winch reel and a jockey roller located above the dye liquor in the top of the machine. The reel and roller aid in the movement of the fabric loop through the dye liquor. The winch reel controls how fast the fabric moves through the solution. This aids in the circulation of the fabric loop through the dye liquor by hauling it out of the solution and over the roller. The jockey roller acts as a guide for the fabric, helping it move through the width of the solution. To achieve this stimulation, the jockey roller is free moving. The winch machine also has a front compartment, that is separate from the main dye vat. The front compartment is separated by a perforated partition and is the location where the dyestuff and dye auxiliaries are added to the dyeing process. To control the heat of dye liquor during this method, heating coils are positioned along the side of the front compartment.

=== Jet dyeing machine ===
The jet dyeing machine is a large vat that has a closed tubular system called a venturi. Unlike the jigger and winch dyeing methods which use a reel system, the venturi guides the fabric. The venturi is where the jets pulsate the dye. The jet dyeing machine consists of a large dye tank that is connected to a heat chamber through pumps that filter and control the temperature of the dye solution. Another pressurised pump moves the dye from the heat chamber to the venturi. The fabric is then formed into a loop and moves through the dye chamber into the venturi. Next the fabric is moved around the venturi and the dye chamber by the pressurised dye solution. This movement is aided by a reel that helps guide the fabric into the venturi, however the jet system remains the dominant form of movement.

=== Beam dyeing machine ===
The beam dyeing machine is a large dye vat that consists of a perforated beam that an open width of fabric is wound around. The perforated beam sits within the dye beam carrier. The machine consists of a number of high pressure pumps that transfer the dye liquor in and out of the machine. The dye liquor moves through the perforated holes in the beam into the high pressure beam carrier and then out through pumps located on the edge of the beam carrier.

== Processes ==
=== Jigger dyeing process ===
The jigger dyeing machine is optimally used for the dyeing of woven fabrics. The jigger dyeing process involves the movement of fabric, while the dye liquor remains stationary. The dye bath is heated to boiling temperature through the steam heating coil with an atmospheric temperature of 98 degrees Celsius. The jigger dye machine has a short specific liquor ratio due to its step less speed and tension monitoring that allows optimal exhaustion with less dye solution. Around four to five meters of fabric are wound onto a roller during the process. Fabric pieces can be sewn together 'head to tail' to reach this length. The fabric piece is then moved down from the wound roller, through the dye solution and back onto the other roll. The rollers can be reversed so that the process of unwinding and winding can be done multiple times until the dyeing process is complete. Once the process has finished the dye bath is cooled and the fabric is taken out and dried.

=== Winch dyeing process ===
The winch dyeing machine is optimally used for the dyeing of woolen fabrics. The winch dyeing process involves the movement of fabric, while the dye liquor remains stationary. The dye bath is heated through the heating coils within the front compartment to a maximum temperature of 95-98 degrees Celsius. The winch dyeing process has a high specific liquor ratio of around 1:20 to 1:40. Once the dye liquor has been made in the front compartment, the dye solution will gradually move from the front compartment into the main dye vat. The fabric is made into a number of loops by sewing the ends together. These loops are equal in length. The fabric is looped over the two wheels that are located at the top of the dye vat. The fabric has very little tension and most of the loop is immersed in the dye solution. The loop of fabric is rotated through the solution by the pull of the winch roller. The winch roller controls the rate of transport of the fabric loop through the solution. The jockey roller is free moving and acts as a guide to move the fabric loop around the entire dye vat. The fabric continues to rotate through the dye solution until the full exhaustion has been achieved. As a result, the winch dyeing process can be lengthy in time. Once the process is finished the dye bath is cooled and the fabric is taken out and dried.

=== Jet dyeing process ===
The jet dyeing machine is optimally used for the dyeing of knit fabrics. The jet dyeing process involves the movement of fabric, as well as the movement of dye liquid. The dye bath is heated to extremely high temperatures with its maximum ranging around 135 to 140 degrees Celsius. The jet dyeing machine uses a low specific liquor ratio ranging from 1:5 to 1:15. The process involves making the fabric into a loop. This is done by sewing the ends together. The fabric is then moved slowly through the autoclave located inside the dye vat. The fabric is immersed in the dye solution which fills the vat. It is then lifted out of the vat by a free moving reel which guides the fabric into a jet that moves it through the venturi. The jet pushes the fabric back through the tube systems and into the other end of the dye vat where the process begins again. The jet creates turbulence within the dye liquor which helps with the exhaustion process. The fabric is exposed to a high concentration of dye liquor when it runs through the venturi tube systems. Therefore, the main dye vat is usually only partially filled. The fabric repeats this loop until the fabric reaches full exhaustion and the colour is achieved, the speed of each circulation is around one to two minutes and the entire process will continue for around twenty to thirty minutes. Once the process has been completed the dye solution is cooled and the fabric is taken out and dried.

=== Beam dyeing process ===
The beam dyeing machine is optimally used for the dyeing of knit and woven fabrics. The beam dyeing process involves the movement of the dye solution, while the fabric remains stationary. The dye liquor is created using a low specific liquor ratio ranging around 1:5. The process requires a high temperature for the dye solution. The dye solution is heated to a maximum of 140 degrees Celsius. An open width of fabric is first rolled onto the perforated beam. While the fabric is wound onto the perforated beam, a controlled tension is upheld to ensure that the fabric is not creased during the dyeing process. The perforated beams come in different sizes to accommodate different widths in the fabric. The beams range from 300mm to 1100mm. Once the fabric has been wound onto the beam, the beam is then loaded into the dye beam carrier. The dye beam carrier is then closed and the machine is pressurised. The dye solution is loaded and heated in the closed expansion tank. The dye liquor then travels through the pressurised pumps into the perforated beam. The pressurised pumps push the dye liquor through the perforated holes in the beam and the wound up fabric and into the dye beam carrier. The agitation on the dye liquor as it is pushed through the fabric ensures that the fabric absorbs the dye colour. Pumps located on the edge of the dye beam carrier work to pump the dye liquor out of the dye beam carrier and back around into the perforated beam. This then allows for the process to begin again. Once the process has been completed the dye solution is cooled and the fabric is taken out and dried.
