= Dyeing =

Process of adding color to textile products

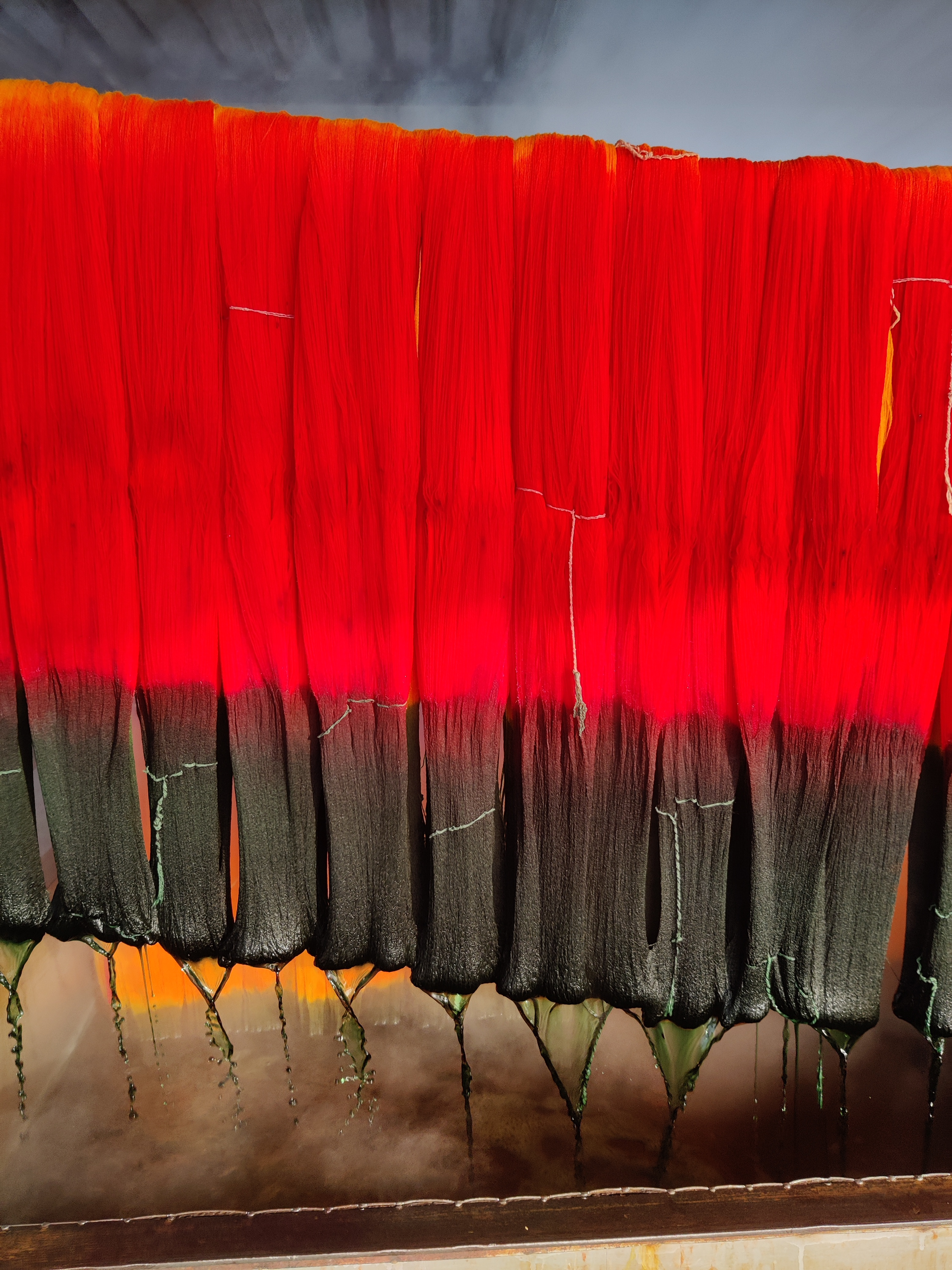
Space dyeing

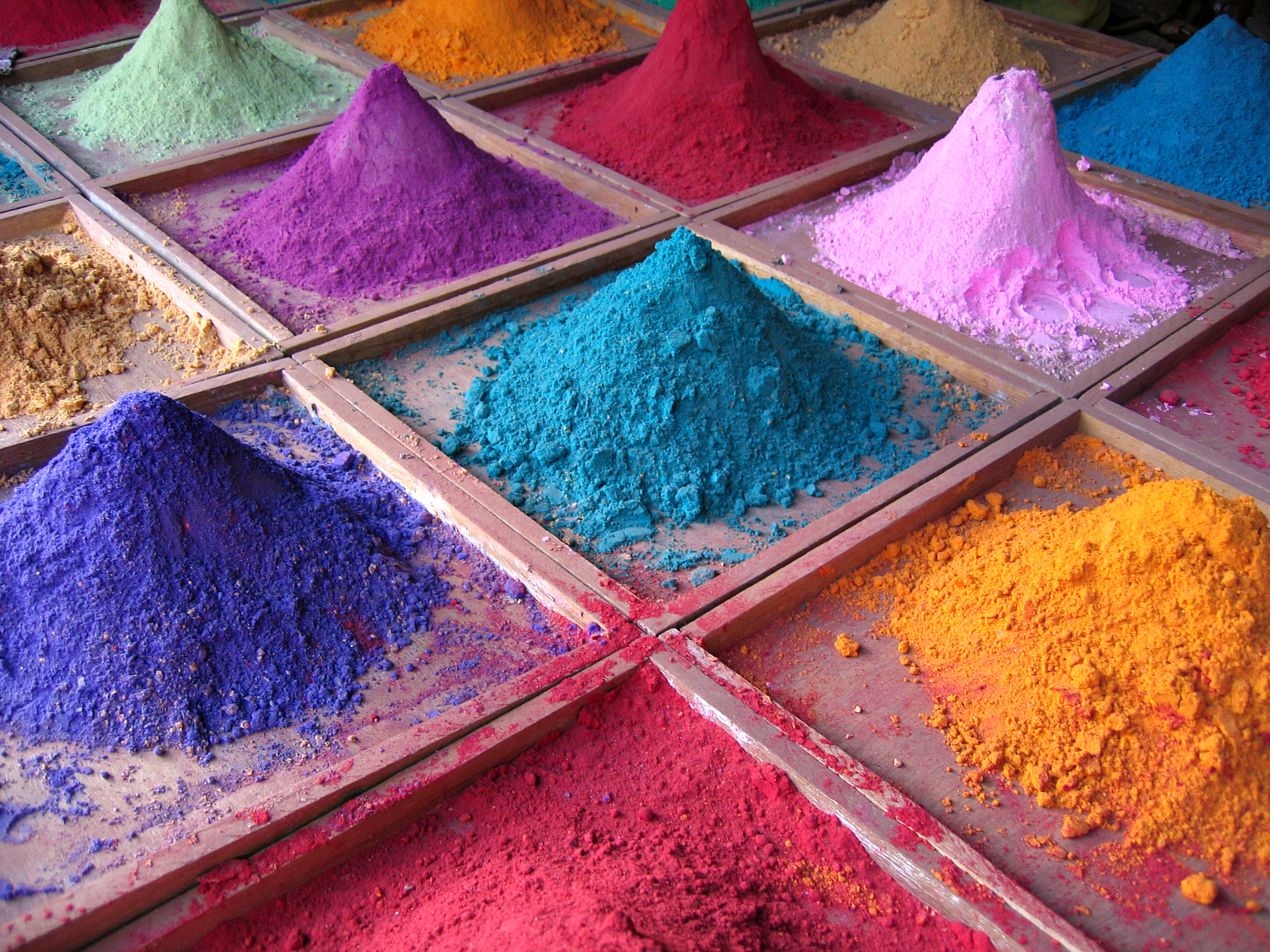
Pigments for sale at a market in Goa, India

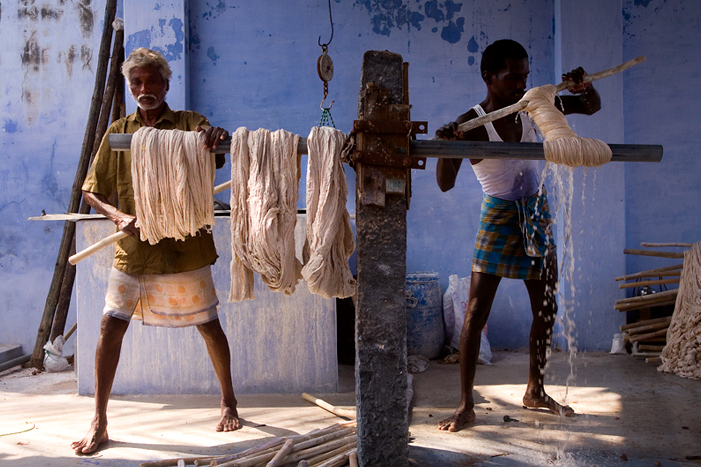
Cotton being dyed manually in contemporary India

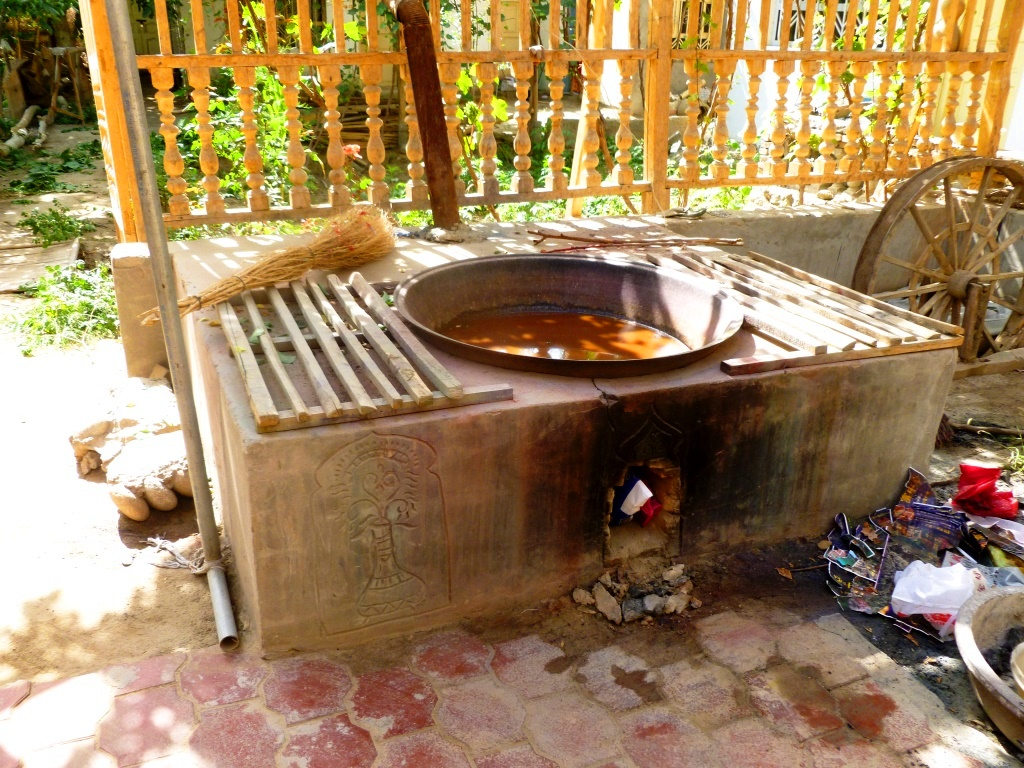
Silk dye in pan on stove, Khotan

Dyeing is the application of dyes or pigments on textile materials such as fibers, yarns, and fabrics with the goal of achieving color with desired color fastness. Dyeing is normally done in a special solution containing dyes and particular chemical material. Dye molecules are fixed to the fiber by absorption, diffusion, or bonding with temperature and time being key controlling factors. The bond between the dye molecule and fiber may be strong or weak, depending on the dye used.

The primary source of dye, historically, has been nature, with the dyes being extracted from plants or animals. Since the mid-19th century, however, humans have produced artificial dyes to achieve a broader range of colors and to render the dyes more stable for washing and general use. Different classes of dyes are used for different types of fiber and at different stages of the textile production process, from loose fibers through yarn and cloth to complete garments.

Acrylic fibers are dyed with basic dyes, while nylon and protein fibers such as wool and silk are dyed with acid dyes, and polyester yarn is dyed with dispersed dyes. Cotton is dyed with a range of dye types, including vat dyes, and modern synthetic reactive and direct dyes.

== Etymology ==
The word 'dye' (/ˈdaɪ/, DIE) comes from the Middle English deie, and from the Old English dēag and dēah. The first known use of the word 'dye' was before the 12th century.

== History ==
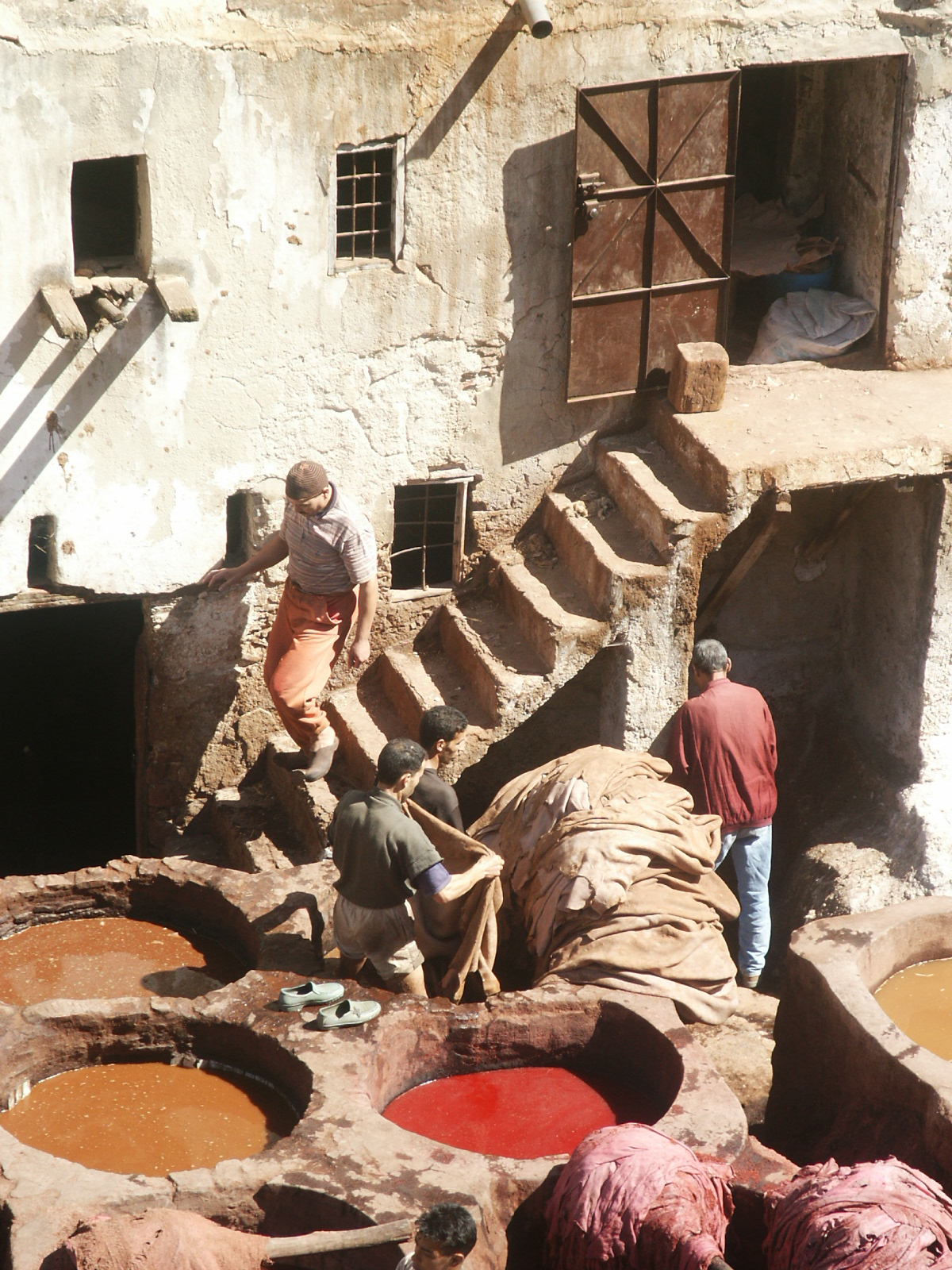
Dyeing in Fes, Morocco

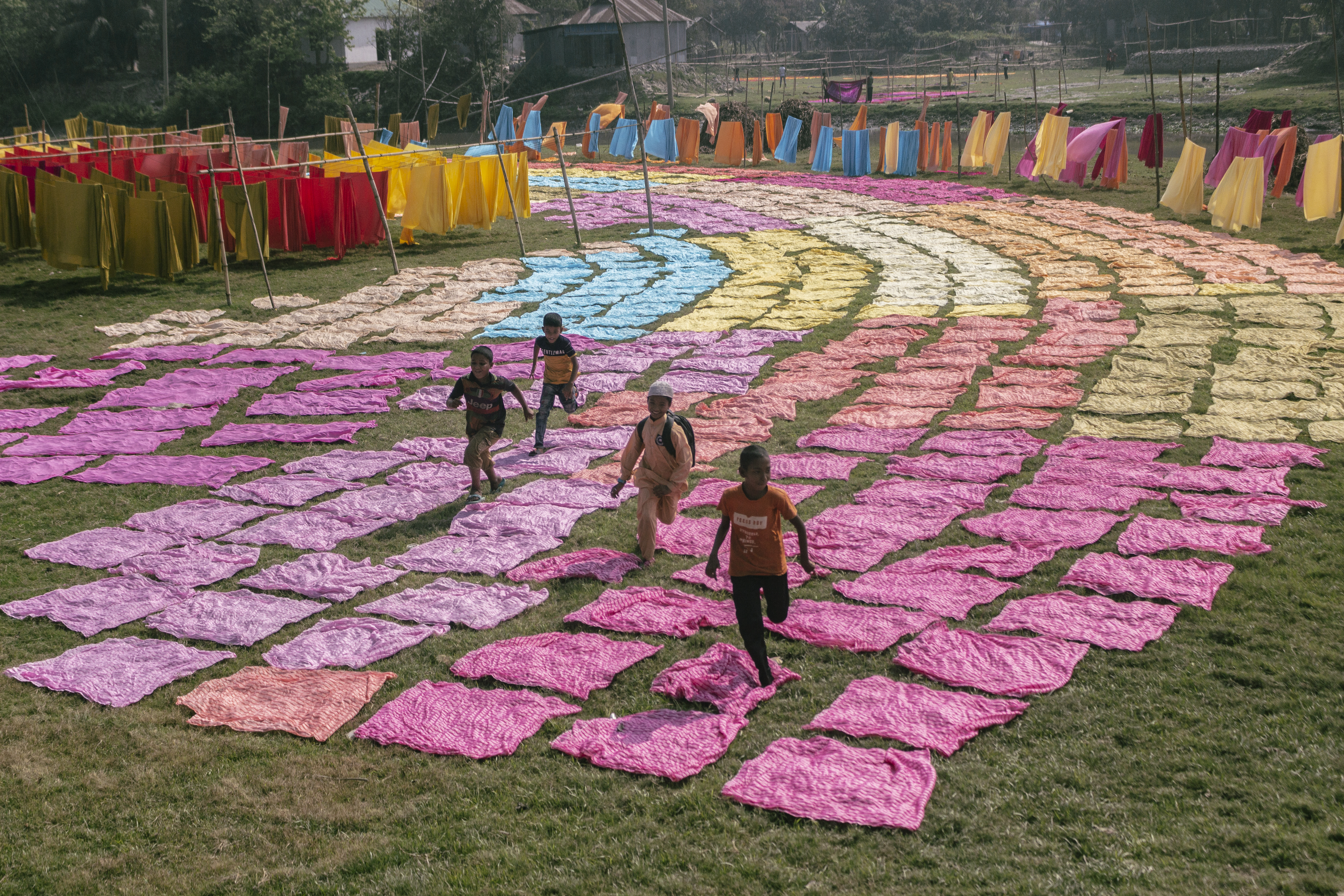
Children playing amongst drying colored cloth in Bangladesh

The earliest dyed flax fibers have been found in a prehistoric cave in Georgia and dates back to 34,000 BC. More evidence of textile dyeing dates back to the Neolithic period at the large Neolithic settlement at Çatalhöyük in southern Anatolia, where traces of red dyes, possibly from ocher, an iron oxide pigment derived from clay, were found. In China, dyeing with plants, barks, and insects has been traced back more than 5,000 years. Early evidence of dyeing comes from Sindh province in Ancient India modern day Pakistan, where a piece of cotton dyed with a vegetable dye was recovered from the archaeological site at Mohenjo-daro (3rd millennium BCE). The dye used in this case was madder, which, along with other dyes such as indigo, was introduced to other regions through trade. Natural insect dyes such as Cochineal and kermes and plant-based dyes such as woad, indigo and madder were important elements of the economies of Asia and Europe until the discovery of man-made synthetic dyes in the mid-19th century. The first synthetic dye was William Perkin's mauveine in 1856, derived from coal tar. Alizarin, the red dye present in madder, was the first natural pigment to be duplicated synthetically in 1869, a development which led to the collapse of the market for naturally grown madder. The development of new, strongly colored synthetic dyes followed quickly, and by the 1870s commercial dyeing with natural dyestuffs was disappearing. An important characteristic was light-fastness - resistance to fading when exposed to sunlight using industrial techniques such as those developed by James Morton.

== Methods ==
Dyeing can be applied at various stages within the textile manufacturing process; for example, fibers may be dyed before being spun into yarns, and yarns may be dyed before being woven into fabrics. Fabrics and sometimes finished garments themselves may also be dyed. The stage at which a product is dyed varies depending on its intended end use, the cost to the manufacturer, its desired appearance, and the resources available, amongst other reasons. There are specific terms to describe these dyeing methods, such as:

- Dope dyeing: In dope dyeing, pigments are added to the polymer solution itself before extruding the fibers. The process provides the dyed fibers with excellent fastness properties. The dope dyeing applies to synthetic fiber only. This method of dyeing is also known as solution dyeing and 'mass coloration' or 'mass colored'. It has limited color options.
- Fiber dyeing: In fiber dyeing, the dyeing takes place at the fiber stage before they are spun into yarn. It is also called stock dyeing. Examples are melanges and medleys.
- Yarn dyeing: In yarn dyeing, the yarns are dyed first before the fabric manufacturing stage. The yarn dyeing happens in hanks or in package dyeing. Package dyeing is a method where yarns are wound on perforated cones placed in a dye vessel. The dye solution is then alternatively pushed inside out and vice versa. Examples are many stripes, patterned (checks) and jacquard designed fabrics.
- Piece dyeing: In piece dyeing, the dyeing takes place after producing fabrics with undyed yarns. Most of the solid dyed fabrics are dyed with the piece dyeing method, and the materials are also called piece dyed.
- Garment dyeing: In garment dyeing, the garments are constructed of undyed, but ready-for-dyeing, fabrics.

=== Terms for different dyed materials ===
There are various terms used in the manufacturing and marketing industries depending on the method used to dye the substrate. For example, "stock dyed" refers to dyeing the fibers before making the yarn, "yarn dyed" refers to dyeing the yarns before producing fabrics, and "piece dyed" or "fabric dyed" refers to dyeing the yarns after they are converted into fabric. The fastness of fiber- and yarn-dyed materials is superior to that of fabrics.

=== Objective ===
The primary objective of the dyeing process is to achieve uniform color application in accordance with a predetermined color matching standard or reference on the substrate, which may be a fiber, yarn, or fabric, while meeting specified colour fastness requirements. Tie-dye and printing are the methods where the color is applied in a localized manner.

=== Application ===
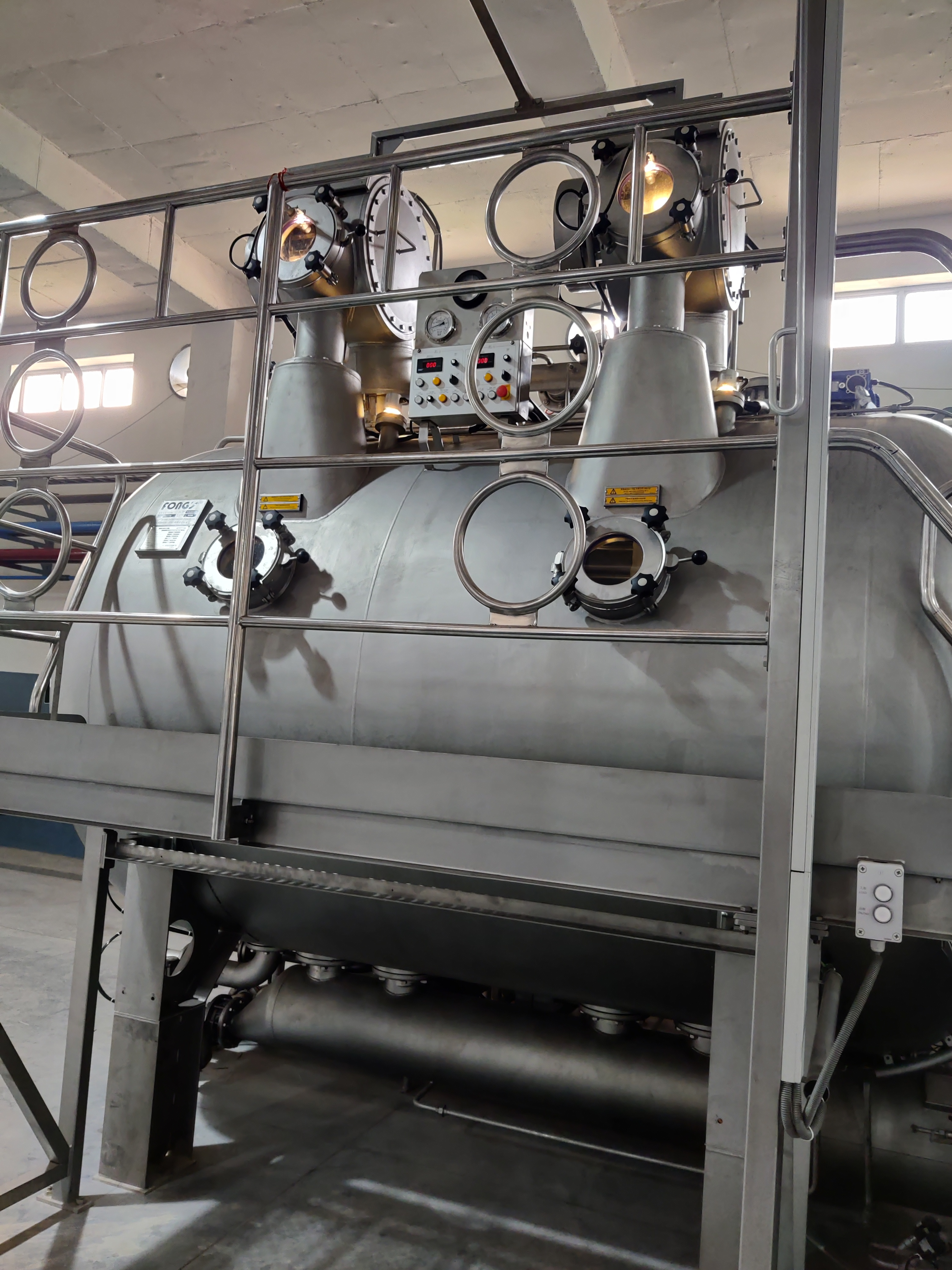
Exhaust dyeing vessel

==== Exhaust method ====
In the exhaust method, the dye is transported to the substrate by the dye liquor's motion. The dye is adsorbed onto the fibre surface and ideally diffuses into the whole of the fibre. Water consumption in exhaust application is higher than the continuous dyeing method. There are three corresponding ways of dyeing with the exhaust method.

1. Liquor circulating: loose stock, sliver, tow, yarn or fabric, is packed into canisters, wound onto cones or perforated beams and placed inside the dyeing vessel. In this way the liquor is pumped and revolves through the material which is stationary.
2. Material circulating: Fabric winch dyeing and jiggers are the few forms in which material remains in motion and liquor stationary. In this the material moves through the stationary liquor.
3. Liquor and material both in motion: Jet dyeing and softflow dyeing application methods where material and liquor both remain in motion.

==== Continuous method ====
In continuous method dye is transported to the substrate by passing it through the different stages but continuously. The continuous method is an innovative method where many discrete dyeing stages are combined, such as applying color, fixation and, washing off of unfixed dyes. Types of continuous dyeing are as follows

- Pad-steam
- Pad dry
- Thermosol

Cold pad batch method is a semi-continuous dyeing process.

==== Waterless dyeing method ====
Waterless dyeing, also known as dry dyeing, is the newly developed and more sustainable dyeing method in which the dyes are applied to the substrate with the help of carbon dioxide or solutions that need less or no water compared to their counterparts.

=== Selection of dyes ===
The selection of the appropriate dyes is most important because any given dye does not apply to every type of fiber. Dyes are classified according to many parameters, such as chemical structure, affinity, application method, desired colour fastness i.e. resistance to washing, rubbing, and light. The properties may vary with different dyes. The selection of dye depends on the objective in dyeing and affinity (to which material is to be dyed). Fastness of color largely depends upon the molecular size of the dyes and the solubility. Larger molecular size serves better washing fastness results.

Indigo dyes have a poor wash and rubbing fastness on denim (cotton), so they are used to produce washed-down effects on fabrics. In contrast, vat or reactive dyes are applied to cotton to achieve excellent washing fastness.

The next important criterion for selecting dyes is the assessment of hazards to human health and the environment. There are many dyes especially disperse dyes that may cause allergic reactions to some individuals, and the negative impact on the environment. There are national and international standards and regulations which need to comply.

=== Direct application ===
Chemical structure of Vat Green 1, a type of vat dye

The term "direct dye application" stems from some dyestuff having to be either fermented as in the case of some natural dye or chemically reduced as in the case of synthetic vat and sulfur dyes before being applied. This renders the dye soluble so that it can be absorbed by the fiber since the insoluble dye has very little substantivity to the fiber. Direct dyes, a class of dyes largely for dyeing cotton, are water-soluble and can be applied directly to the fiber from an aqueous solution. Most other classes of synthetic dye, other than vat and surface dyes, are also applied in this way.

The term may also be applied to dyeing without the use of mordants to fix the dye once it is applied. Mordants were often required to alter the hue and intensity of natural dyes and improve color fastness. Until recently, Chromium salts were extensively used in dyeing wool with synthetic mordant dyes. These were used for economical high color fastness dark shades such as black and navy. Environmental concerns have now restricted their use, and they have been replaced with reactive and metal complex dyes that do not require mordant.

=== Yarn dyeing ===
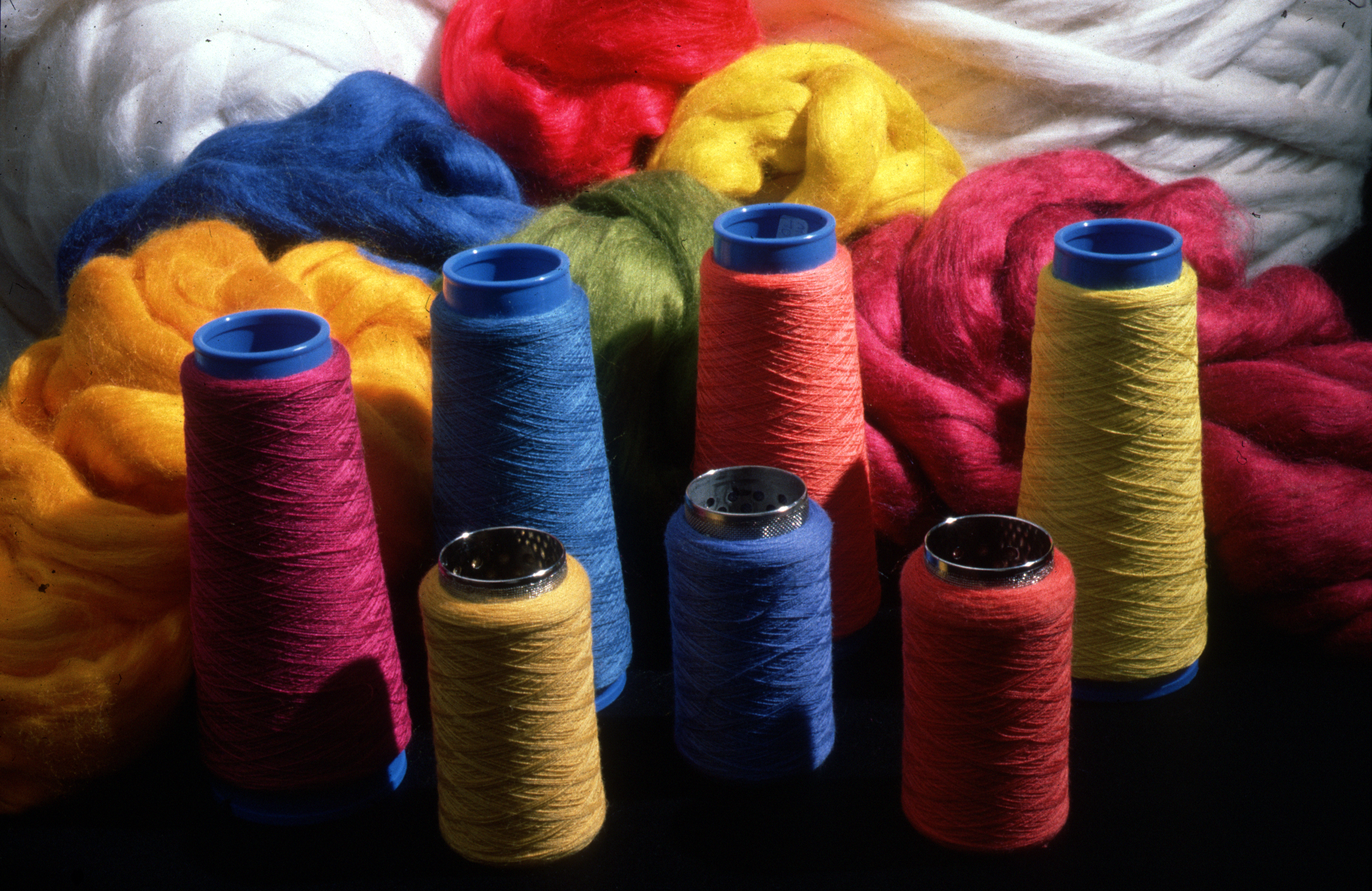
Dyed wool reels (CSIRO)

There are many forms of yarn dyeing. Common forms are the package form and the hanks form. Cotton yarns are mostly dyed at package form, and acrylic or wool yarn are dyed at hank form. In the continuous filament industry, polyester or polyamide yarns are always dyed at package form, while viscose rayon yarns are partly dyed at hank form because of technology.

The common dyeing process of cotton yarn with reactive dyes at package form is as follows:

1. The raw yarn is wound on a spring tube to achieve a package suitable for dye penetration.
2. These softened packages are loaded on a dyeing carrier's spindle one on another.
3. The packages are pressed up to a desired height to achieve suitable density of packing.
4. The carrier is loaded on the dyeing machine and the yarn is dyed.
5. After dyeing, the packages are unloaded from the carrier into a trolley.
6. Now the trolley is taken to hydro extractor where water is removed.
7. The packages are hydro extracted to remove the maximum amount of water leaving the desired color into raw yarn.
8. The packages are then dried to achieve the final dyed package.

After this process, the dyed yarn packages are packed and delivered.

==== Space dyeing ====
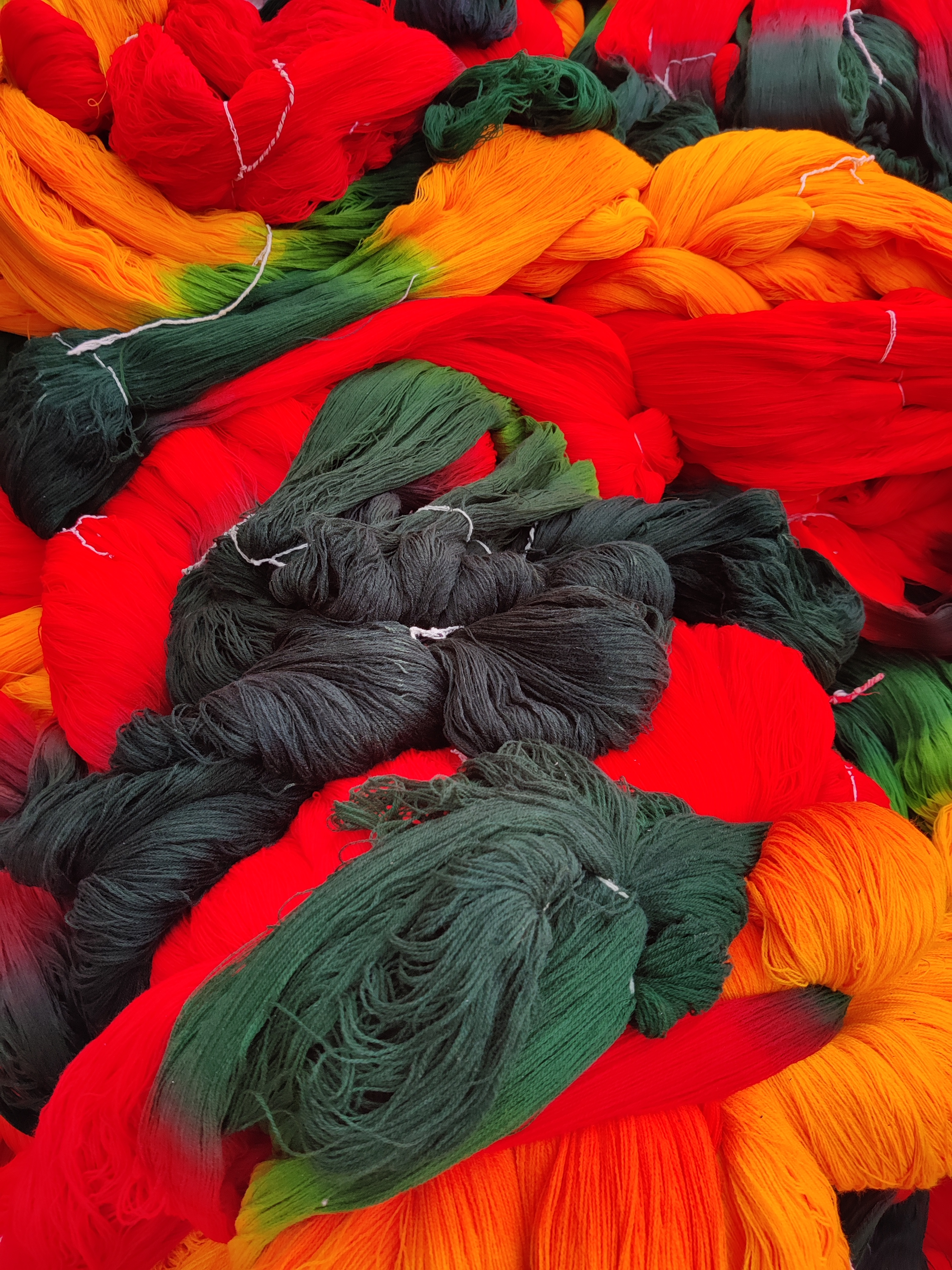
Space dyed yarn

Space dyeing is a technique of localized color application that produces a unique multicolored effect.

== Related terms ==
There are several terms associated with the process of dyeing:

=== Affinity ===
Affinity refers to the chemical attraction between two elements or substances, leading to their inclination to unite or combine, as observed between fiber and dyestuff.

=== Bleeding ===
Materials that exhibit bleeding tendencies may lead to the staining of white or light-colored fabrics in contact with them while in a wet state. The phenomenon of color fading from a fabric or yarn upon immersion in water, solvent, or a comparable liquid medium, arises due to inadequate dyeing or the utilization of inferior quality dyes.

==== Staining ====
Fabric can experience undesired color absorption, resulting in staining, when exposed to water, dry-cleaning solvent, or similar liquids containing unintended dyestuffs or coloring materials. Additionally, direct contact with other dyed materials may cause color transfer through bleeding or sublimation.

=== Stripping ===
Stripping is a method used to partially or entirely remove color from dyed textile materials. It can also be utilized as a reprocessing technique to correct imperfect dyeing.

== See also ==
- Glossary of dyeing terms
- Natural dye
- Tie-dye
- Vat dye
- Resist dyeing
- Wet processing engineering
