= Colour fastness =

Colour's resistance to fading or running

Colour fastness is a term—used in the dyeing of textile materials—that characterizes a material's colour's resistance to fading or running. Colour fastness is the property of dyes and it is directly proportional to the binding force between photochromic dye and the fibre. The colour fastness may also be affected by processing techniques and choice of chemicals and auxiliaries.

The term is usually used in the context of clothes. In general, clothing should be tested for colour fastness before using bleach or other cleaning products. It can also apply to upholstery fabrics.

Lightfastness, wash fastness, and rub fastness are the main forms of colour fastness that are standardized. The light fastness of textile dye is categorized from one to eight and the wash fastness from one to five, with a higher number indicating better fastness.

== Washing fastness ==
The term washing fastness of textiles pertains to the capacity of textile materials, such as fabrics or garments, to maintain their original colour and appearance after undergoing multiple washing and laundering processes. It signifies the textile's ability to endure repeated washing without experiencing fading, bleeding, or other undesirable alterations. The washing fastness of the dyed material is determined by factors such as the solubility and rate of dye desorption from the textile material into soap, detergent, or different alkaline conditions.

== Light fastness ==
Lightfastness is a characteristic of a colourant, such as dye or pigment, which denotes its ability to resist fading when subjected to light exposure.

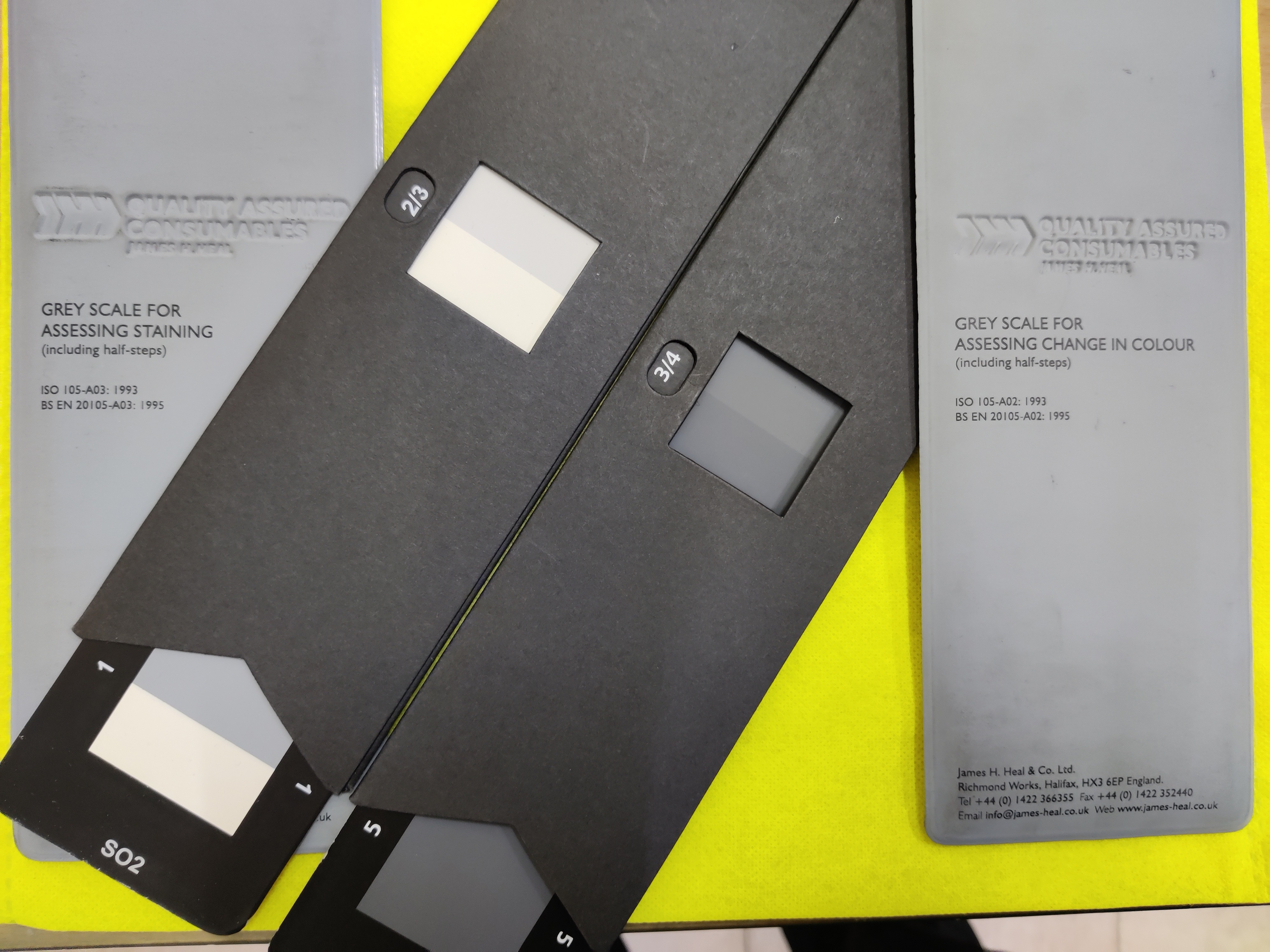
Grey scales for assessing the grades of colour fastness

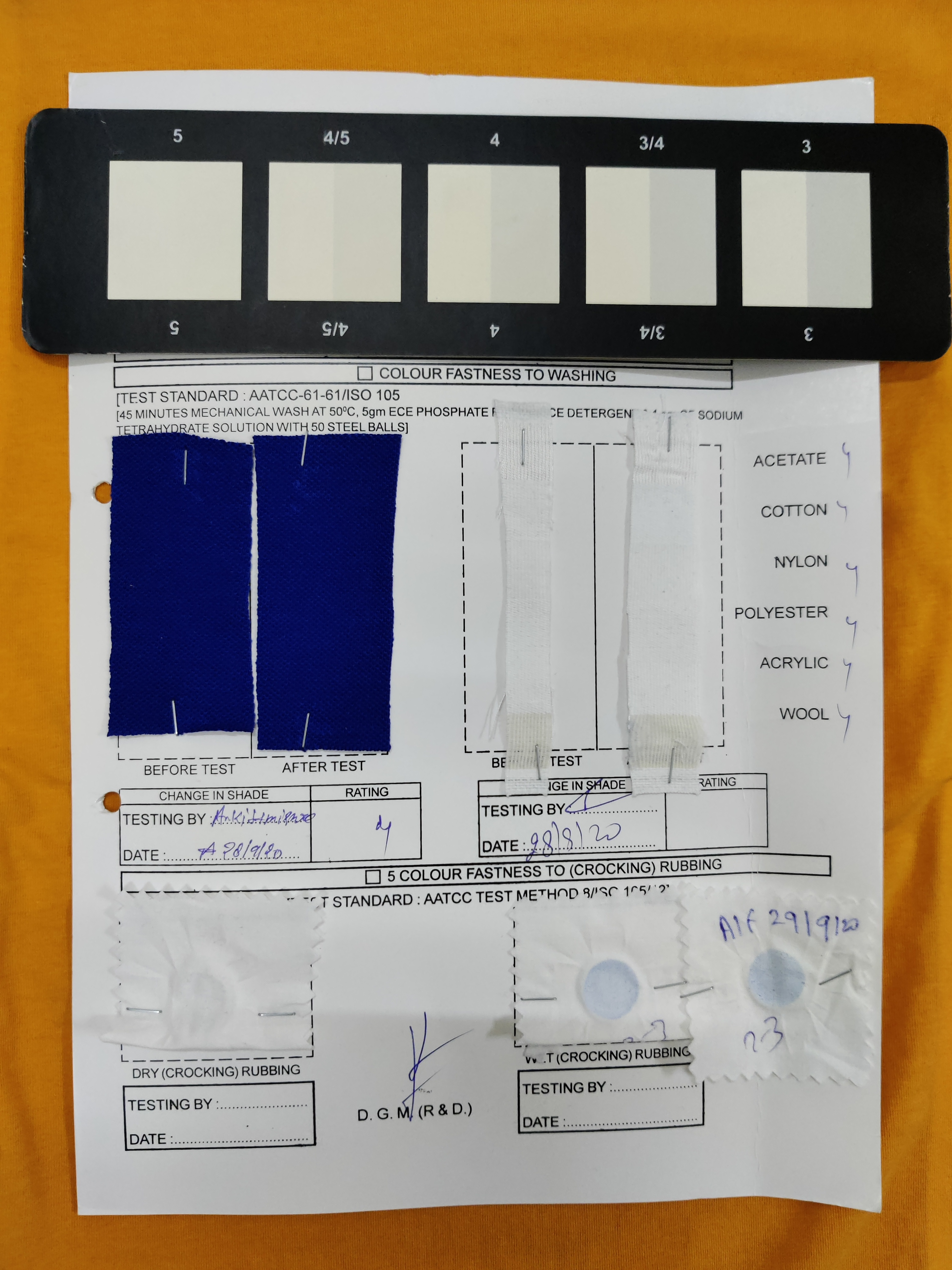
Colour fastness test report with grading for demonstration purpose

== Dye and the binding forces ==
A dye is a coloured substance that chemically bonds to the substrate to which it is being applied. Dyes are classified according to their solubility and chemical properties. Dyes are selected according to affinity; any given dye does not apply to every type of fiber. Different binding forces act between the dye and substrate, such as Van der Waals forces including attraction and repulsions between atoms, molecules, and surfaces, as well as other intermolecular forces. Direct dye application to cotton results in poor fastness properties when washing. The bond differs from covalent bonding in reactive dyes when applied to cotton, which may result far better fastness than direct dyes. Covalent bond is a stronger bond, caused by correlations in the fluctuating polarizations of nearby particles (a consequence of quantum dynamics). The use of mordants with dyes is the standard procedure to obtain color fastness.

Pigments as an exception do not bind chemically with textile materials.

== Importance of colour fastness ==
Colour is an influential element of fashion and clothing aesthetics; it has great value for both the user and the brand. Colour is one of the most significant features in attracting customers to buy a product or garment, and retaining the original colour is one of the important quality parameters of coloured textiles. Colour fastness is rated poor if the item does not comply with tests exposing it to washing, light, rubbing and other agents such as perspiration.

== Test methods for colour fastness ==
Standardized testing for colour fastness and other parameters was established in the 20th century by industrialized economies such as the US, the UK, Japan, and Europe. The American Association of Textile Chemists and Colorists (AATCC), International Organization for Standardization (ISO) and Society of Dyers and Colourists played vital roles in establishing the test methods.

There are various tests and testing methods according to the physical and functional requirements of the product. For example, fastness to saliva may be important for childrenswear and perspiration and light are important for a golf shirt. European and US retailers use ISO and AATCC standards respectively.
