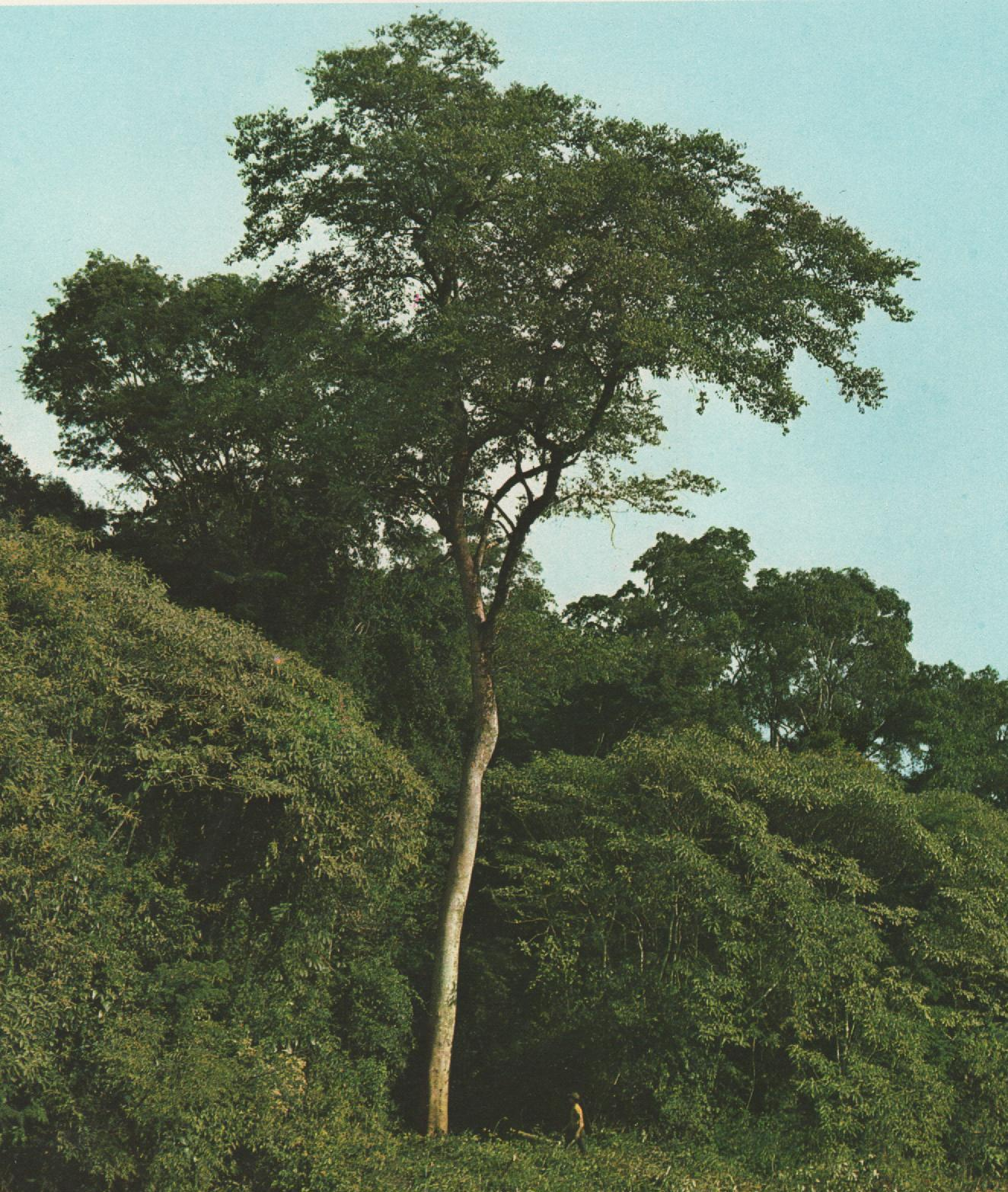
- In Argentina

Conservation status
- Least Concern (IUCN 3.1)

Scientific classification
- Kingdom: Plantae
- Clade: Tracheophytes
- Clade: Angiosperms
- Clade: Eudicots
- Clade: Rosids
- Order: Rosales
- Family: Moraceae
- Genus: Maclura
- Species: M. tinctoria

Binomial name
- Maclura tinctoria (L.) Steud.

Synonyms
- Synonymy: Broussonetia tinctoria (L.) Dum.Cours.; Broussonetia plumeri Spreng.; Broussonetia zanthoxylon (L.) Mart.; Chlorophora mora (Griseb.) Lillo; Chlorophora tinctoria (L.) Benth. & Hook.f.; Chlorophora tinctoria var. acuminatissima Huber; Chlorophora tinctoria var. affinis (Miq.) Hassl.; Chlorophora tinctoria var. chlorocarpa (Liebm.) Hemsl.; Chlorophora tinctoria subsp. eutinctoria Hassl., not validly publ.; Chlorophora tinctoria f. glabrescens Huber; Chlorophora tinctoria f. miqueliana Hassl.; Chlorophora tinctoria var. mora (Griseb.) Lillo; Chlorophora tinctoria subsp. mora (Griseb.) Hassl.; Chlorophora tinctoria var. ovata (Bureau) Chodat; Chlorophora tinctoria f. ovata (Bureau) Hassl.; Chlorophora tinctoria f. polyneura (Miq.) Hassl.; Chlorophora tinctoria var. subintegerrima (Miq.) Hemsl.; Chlorophora tinctoria f. tataiiba (Vell.) Hassl.; Chlorophora tinctoria subsp. zanthoxylon (L.) Hassl.; Chlorophora tinctoria var. zanthoxylon (L.) Hemsl.; Fusticus glabra Raf.; Fusticus tataiba (L.) Raf.; Fusticus tinctoria (L.) Raf.; Fusticus vera Raf.; Fusticus zanthoxylon (L.) Raf.; Ioxylon mora Kuntze; Maclura affinis Miq.; Maclura chlorocarpa Liebm.; Maclura mora Griseb.; Maclura plumiera G.Don; Maclura polyneura Miq.; Maclura sempervirens Ten.; Maclura sieberi Blume; Maclura subintegerrima Miq.; Maclura tinctoria var. affinis (Miq.) Bureau; Maclura tinctoria var. chlorocarpa (Liebm.) Bureau; Maclura tinctoria subvar. lobata Bureau; Maclura tinctoria subsp. mora (Griseb.) Vázq.Avila; Maclura tinctoria var. ovata Bureau; Maclura tinctoria var. polyneura (Miq.) Bureau; Maclura tinctoria subvar. quercina Bureau; Maclura tinctoria subvar. sinuata Bureau; Maclura tinctoria var. subcuneata Bureau; Maclura tinctoria var. subintegerrima (Miq.) Bureau; Maclura tinctoria var. zanthoxylon (L.) Bureau; Maclura trilobata Rojas; Maclura velutina Blume; Maclura zanthoxylon (L.) Endl.; Morus brasiliensis Pohl ex Bureau, not validly publ.; Morus dioica Crantz; Morus plumiera Steud., not validly publ.; Morus spinosa Gaudich.; Morus tataiba Vell.; Morus tatayiba D.Parodi; Morus tinctoria L.; Morus zanthoxylon L.; Procris sieberi Steud., not validly publ.

= Maclura tinctoria =

Species of tree

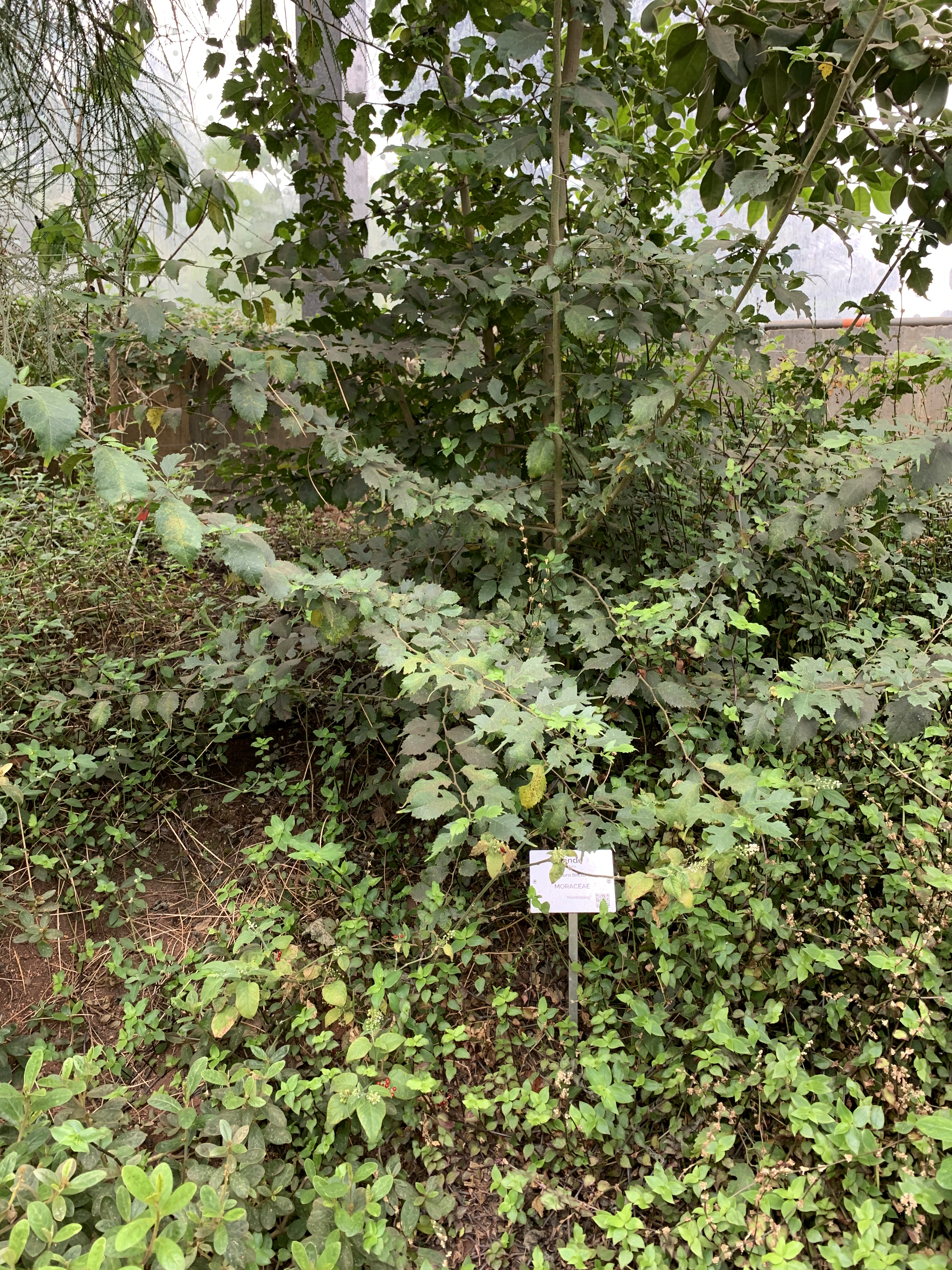
In Colombia

Maclura tinctoria, known as old fustic and dyer's mulberry, is a medium to large tree of the Neotropics, from Mexico to Argentina. It produces a yellow dye called fustic primarily known for coloring khaki fabric for U.S. military apparel during World War I. This dye contains the flavonoid morin. It is dioecious, so both male and female plants are needed to set seed.

The leaves can be used to feed silk worms.

Old fustic is not to be confused with young fustic (Rhus cotinus) from southern Europe and Asia, which provides a more fugitive colour.

== Dyeing ==
Fustic is a bright yellow dye that is very color-fast when used with mordants. It is frequently combined with other dyestuffs and various mordants to produce a range of yellow and greenish colors:

- With woad or indigo: bright or Saxon greens
- With bichromate of potash: old gold
- With logwood and bichromate of potash: greenish yellows
- With copper(II) sulfate: olive greens
- With ferrous sulfate: dark greens
