= Morinda pubescens =

Scientific classification
- Kingdom: Plantae
- Clade: Tracheophytes
- Clade: Angiosperms
- Clade: Eudicots
- Clade: Asterids
- Order: Gentianales
- Family: Rubiaceae
- Genus: Morinda
- Species: M. pubescens

Binomial name
- Morinda pubescens Sm.

Synonyms
- Morinda aspera Wight & Arn.; Morinda coreia Buch.-Ham.; Morinda coreia var. aspera (Wight & Arn.) Deb & M.Gangop.; Morinda exserta Roxb.; Morinda pubescens var. aspera (Wight & Arn.) M.Gangop.; Morinda tinctoria Roxb.

Species of plants

Morinda pubescens is an Asian species of plants in the family Rubiaceae; it is a shrub or small tree and has been recorded from India, Sri Lanka, Indochina and Java, according to Plants of the World Online.
