= EHEC =

EHEC may mean:

- Enterohemorrhagic Escherichia coli, strain of bacteria
- Ethyl hydroxyethyl cellulose, a chemical compound
