= E number =

Codes for food additives

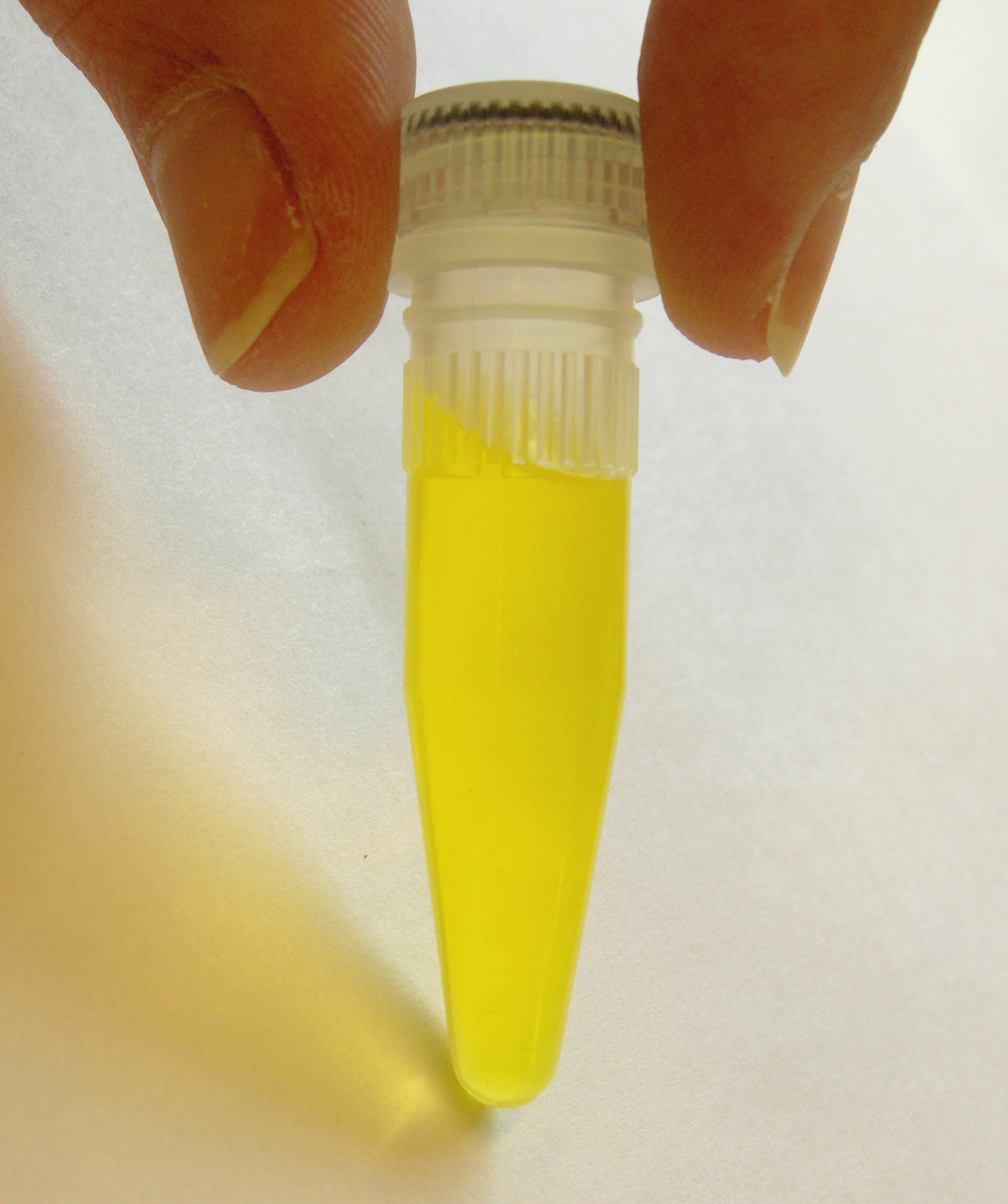
A solution of E101 riboflavin (also known as vitamin B_{2})

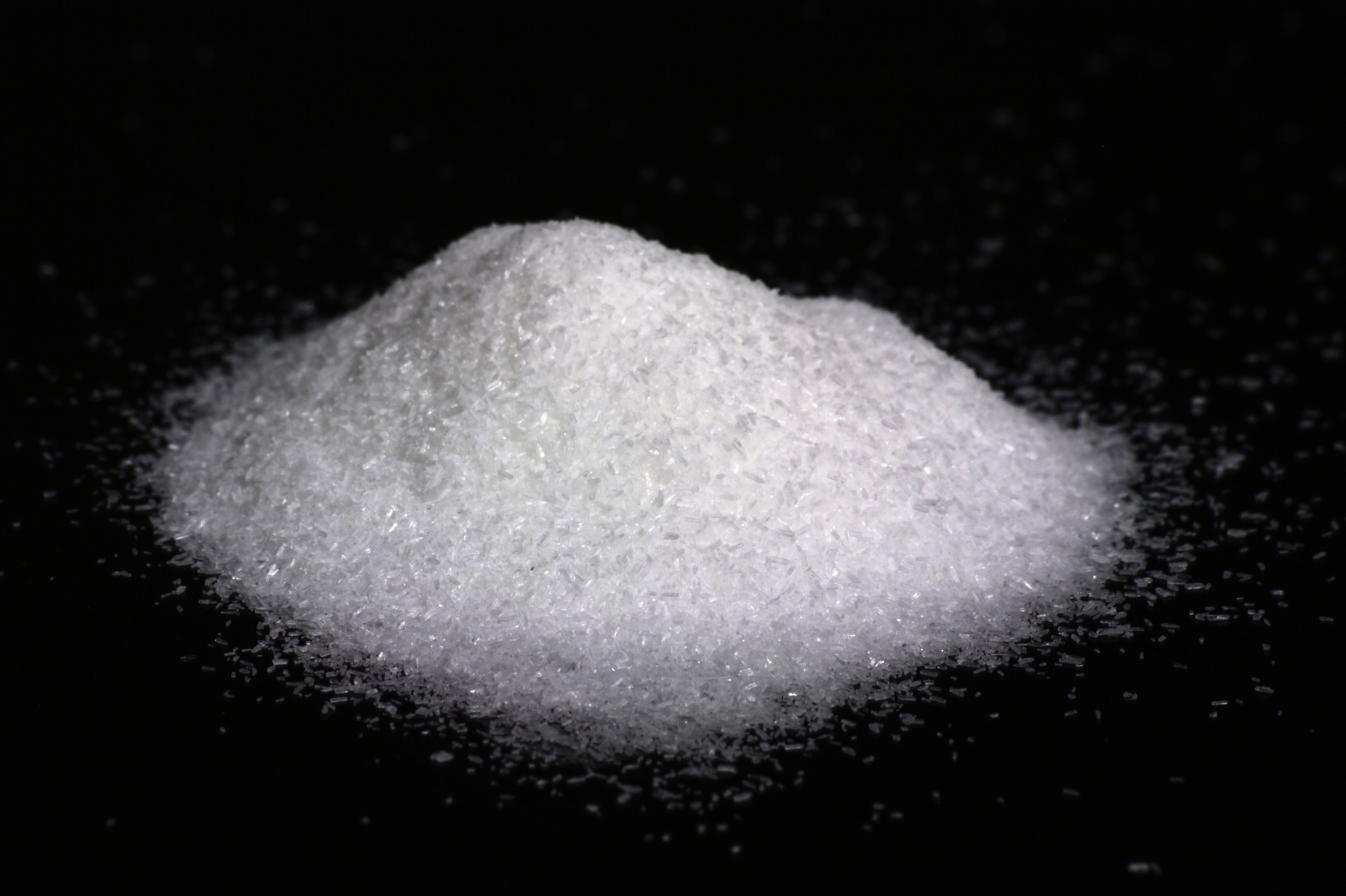
Crystals of E621 monosodium glutamate (MSG), a flavour enhancer

E numbers, short for Europe numbers, are codes for substances used as food additives, including those found naturally in many foods, such as vitamin C, for use within the European Union (EU) and European Free Trade Association (EFTA). Commonly found on food labels, their safety assessment and approval are the responsibility of the European Food Safety Authority (EFSA). Originally, animal feed additives were also assigned E numbers, but the European Commision is moving away from using the E number code, and rather assigning a new identification number. The fact that an additive has an E number implies that its use was at one time permitted in products for sale in the European Single Market; some of these additives are no longer allowed today.

The definition of 'food additive' provided by the European commision is any substance not normally consumed as a food, not normally used as an ingredient in a food, whether or not it has nutritional value, the intentional addition of the additive to food for a technological purpose in the manufacture, processing, preparation, treatment, packaging, transport or storage of such food results, or may be reasonably expected to result, in it or its byproducts becoming a component of the food.

Having a single unified list for food additives was first agreed upon in 1962 with food colouring. In 1964, the directives for preservatives were added; In 1970 antioxidants were added; In 1974 emulsifiers, stabilisers, thickeners and gelling agents were added as well.

== Numbering schemes ==
The numbering scheme follows that of the International Numbering System (INS) as determined by the Codex Alimentarius committee, though only a subset of the INS additives are approved for use in the European Union as food additives. Outside the European continent plus Russia, E numbers are also encountered on food labelling in other jurisdictions, including the Gulf Cooperation Council, South Africa, Australia, New Zealand, Malaysia, Hong Kong, and India.

== Colloquial use ==
In some European countries, the "E number" is used informally as a derogatory term for artificial food additives. For example, in the UK, food companies are required to include the "E number(s)" in the ingredients that are added as part of the manufacturing process. Many components of naturally occurring healthy foods and vitamins have assigned E numbers (and the number is a synonym for the chemical component), e.g. vitamin C (E300) and lycopene (E160d), found in carrots. At the same time, "E number" is sometimes misunderstood to imply approval for safe consumption. This is not necessarily the case, e.g. Avoparcin (E715) is an antibiotic once used in animal feed, but is no longer permitted in the EU, and has never been permitted for human consumption. Sodium nitrite (E250) is toxic. Sulfuric acid (E513) is harmful to organic tissues.

== Classification by numeric range ==
E number range	Subranges	Description
1-99 Trace elements	1-99	Trace elements
100–199 (full list) Colours	100–107	yellows
100–199 (full list) Colours	110–111	oranges
100–199 (full list) Colours	120–129	reds
100–199 (full list) Colours	130–139	blues and violets
100–199 (full list) Colours	140–149	greens
100–199 (full list) Colours	150–159	browns and blacks
100–199 (full list) Colours	160–199	gold and others
200–299 (full list) Preservatives	200–209	sorbates
200–299 (full list) Preservatives	210–219	benzoates
200–299 (full list) Preservatives	220–229	sulfites
200–299 (full list) Preservatives	230–239	phenols and formates (methanoates)
200–299 (full list) Preservatives	240–259	nitrates
200–299 (full list) Preservatives	260–269	acetates (ethanoates)
200–299 (full list) Preservatives	270–279	lactates
200–299 (full list) Preservatives	280–289	propionates (propanoates)
200–299 (full list) Preservatives	290–299	others
300–399 (full list) Antioxidants and acidity regulators	300–305	ascorbates (vitamin C)
300–399 (full list) Antioxidants and acidity regulators	306–309	Tocopherol (vitamin E)
300–399 (full list) Antioxidants and acidity regulators	310–319	gallates and erythorbates
300–399 (full list) Antioxidants and acidity regulators	320–329	lactates
300–399 (full list) Antioxidants and acidity regulators	330–337	citrates and tartrates
300–399 (full list) Antioxidants and acidity regulators	338–343	phosphates
300–399 (full list) Antioxidants and acidity regulators	344–345	citrates
300–399 (full list) Antioxidants and acidity regulators	349–359	malates and adipates
300–399 (full list) Antioxidants and acidity regulators	360–369	succinates and fumarates
300–399 (full list) Antioxidants and acidity regulators	370–399	others
400–499 (full list) Thickeners, stabilisers and emulsifiers	400–409	alginates
400–499 (full list) Thickeners, stabilisers and emulsifiers	410–419	natural gums
400–499 (full list) Thickeners, stabilisers and emulsifiers	420–429	other natural agents
400–499 (full list) Thickeners, stabilisers and emulsifiers	430–439	polyoxyethene compounds
400–499 (full list) Thickeners, stabilisers and emulsifiers	440–449	natural emulsifiers
400–499 (full list) Thickeners, stabilisers and emulsifiers	450–459	phosphates
400–499 (full list) Thickeners, stabilisers and emulsifiers	460–469	cellulose compounds
400–499 (full list) Thickeners, stabilisers and emulsifiers	470–489	fatty acids and compounds
400–499 (full list) Thickeners, stabilisers and emulsifiers	490–499	others
500–599 (full list) pH regulators and anti-caking agents	500–509	mineral acids and bases
500–599 (full list) pH regulators and anti-caking agents	510–519	chlorides and sulfates
500–599 (full list) pH regulators and anti-caking agents	520–529	sulfates and hydroxides
500–599 (full list) pH regulators and anti-caking agents	530–549	alkali metal compounds
500–599 (full list) pH regulators and anti-caking agents	550–559	silicates
500–599 (full list) pH regulators and anti-caking agents	570–579	stearates and gluconates
500–599 (full list) pH regulators and anti-caking agents	580–599	others
600–650 (full list) Flavour enhancers	620–629	glutamates and guanylates
600–650 (full list) Flavour enhancers	630–639	inosinates
600–650 (full list) Flavour enhancers	640–649	others
651-699 Vitamins, provitamins and chemically well-defined substances having similar effect (for animal feed)	651-699	Vitamins
700–799 (full list) Antibiotics, coccidiostats and other medicinal substances (for animal feed)	700–749	antibiotics
700–799 (full list) Antibiotics, coccidiostats and other medicinal substances (for animal feed)	750-799	coccidiostats
850-899 Growth promoters (for animal feed)	850-899	growth promoters
900–999 (full list) Glazing agents, gases and sweeteners	900–909	waxes
900–999 (full list) Glazing agents, gases and sweeteners	910–919	synthetic glazes
900–999 (full list) Glazing agents, gases and sweeteners	920–929	improving agents
900–999 (full list) Glazing agents, gases and sweeteners	930–949	packaging gases
900–999 (full list) Glazing agents, gases and sweeteners	950–969	sweeteners
900–999 (full list) Glazing agents, gases and sweeteners	990–999	foaming agents
1000–1599 (full list) Additional additives	1100–1599	New chemicals that do not fall into standard classification schemes
1600-1699 Enzymes (for animal feed)	1600-1699	Enzymes
1700-1799 Micro-organisms (for animal feed)	1700-1799	Micro-organisms

Not all examples of a class fall into the given numeric range; moreover, certain chemicals (particularly in the E400–499 range) have a variety of purposes.

== Full list ==
The list shows all components that have an E-number assigned, even those no longer allowed in the EU.

=== E1-E99 (trace elements) ===
Used in animal feed.

Code	Name(s)	Purpose	Status
E1	Iron — Fe: Ferrous carbonate Ferrous chloride, tetrahydrate Ferric chloride, hexahydrate Ferrous citrate, hexahydrate Ferrous fumarate Ferrous lactate, trihydrate Ferric oxide Ferrous sulphate, monohydrate Ferrous sulphate, heptahydrate Ferrous chelate of amino acids, hydrate		
E2	Iodine — I: Calcium iodate, hexahydrate Calcium iodate,anhydrous Sodium iodide Potassium iodide		
E3	Cobalt — Co: Cobaltous acetate, tetrahydrate Basic cobaltous carbonate, monohydrate Cobaltous chloride, hexahydrate Cobaltous sulphate, heptahydrate Cobaltous sulphate,monohydrate Cobaltous nitrate, hexahydrate		
E4	Copper — Cu: Cupric acetate, monohydrate Basic cupric carbonate, monohydrate Cupric chloride, dihydrate Cupric methionate Cupric oxide Cupric sulphate, pentahydrate Cupric sulphate, monohydrate Cupric chelate of amino acids hydrate Copper-lysine sulphate		
E5	Manganese — Mn: Manganous carbonate Manganous chloride, tetrahydrate Manganous hydrogen phosphate, trihydrate Manganous oxide Manganic oxide Manganous sulphate, tetrahydrate Manganous sulphate, monohydrate Manganese chelate of amino acids hydrate Manganomanganic oxide		
E6	Zinc — Zn: Zinc lactate, trihydrate Zinc acetate, dihydrate Zinc carbonate Zinc chloride, monohydrate Zinc oxide Zinc sulphate, heptahydrate Zinc sulphate, monohydrate Zinc chelate of amino acids hydrate		
E7	Molybdenum– Mo: Ammonium molybdate Sodium molybdate		Withdrawn in EU from animal feed in 2021, except sheep.
E8	Selenium — Se: Sodium selenite Sodium selenate		

=== E100–E199 (colours) ===
Code	Name(s)	Colour	Status
E100	Curcumin (from turmeric)	Yellow-orange	Approved in the EU with conditions. Approved in the UK. Approved in the US.
E101	(i) Riboflavin (Vitamin B_{2}), formerly called lactoflavin (ii) Riboflavin-5'-Phosphate	Yellow-orange	Approved in the EU with conditions. Approved in the UK. Approved in the US.
E102	Tartrazine (FD&C Yellow 5)	Yellow	Approved in the EU with conditions. Approved in the UK. Approved in the US.Products in the EU and UK require warnings and its use is being phased out.
E103	Alkannin or Chrysoine S	Red-brown	Not approved in the EU, UK or US. Banned in the EU from 1978.
E104	Quinoline Yellow WS	Dull or greenish yellow	Approved in the EU with conditions. Approved in the UK. Products in the EU and UK require warnings and its use is being phased out. Not approved in the US.
E105	Fast Yellow AB	Yellow	Forbidden in the EU, UK and US. Banned in the EU from 1978.
E106	Riboflavin-5-Sodium Phosphate	Yellow	Closely related to E101a, no individual record.
E107	Yellow 2G	Yellow	Not approved in the EU, UK or US.
E110	Sunset Yellow FCF (Orange Yellow S, FD&C Yellow 6)	Orange	Approved in the EU with conditions. Approved in the UK. Banned in Norway. Products in the EU and UK require warnings and its use is being phased out. Approved in the US.
E111	Orange GGN	Orange	Forbidden in EU, UK and US. Banned in the EU from 1978.
E120	Cochineal, Carminic acid, Carmine (Natural Red 4)	Red	Approved in the EU with conditions. Approved in the UK. Approved in the US.
E121	Citrus Red 2	Orange to pink	Approved in the United States only for use in colouring the skin of oranges. Not approved in the EU and UK.
E122	Carmoisine (azorubine)	Red to maroon	Approved in the EU with conditions. Approved in the UK. Products in the EU and UK require warnings and its use is being phased out. Currently banned in Canada, Japan, Norway, USA
E123	Amaranth (FD&C Red 2)	Red-brown	Approved in the EU with conditions. Approved in the UK. Banned in the United States.
E124	Ponceau 4R (Cochineal Red A, Brilliant Scarlet 4R)	Red	Approved in the EU with conditions. Approved in the UK. Products in the EU and UK require warnings and its use is being phased out. Not approved in the US.
E125	Ponceau SX, Scarlet GN	Red	Only permitted for externally applied drugs and cosmetics in the US. Not approved in the EU and UK. Banned in the EU from 1978.
E126	Ponceau 6R	Red	Not approved in the EU and UK. Banned in the EU from 1978.
E127	Erythrosine (FD&C Red 3)	Red	Approved in the UK. Approved in the EU for cocktail, candied and bigareaux cherries only. Banned in the US.
E128	Red 2G	Red or pink	Not approved in the EU, UK or US.Banned in the EU in 2007 due to its metabolite, aniline, being deemed as carcinogenic.
E129	Allura Red AC (FD&C Red 40)	Red	Approved in the EU with conditions, but banned by individual EU member states: Austria, Belgium, Denmark, France, Germany, and Sweden. Also banned by non-EU countries Norway and Switzerland. Approved in the UK. Products in the EU and UK require warnings and its use is being phased out. Approved in the US.
E130	Indanthrene blue RS	Blue	Not approved in the EU, UK or US. Banned in the EU from 1978.
E131	Patent Blue V	Sky blue	Approved in the EU for preserves of red fruit only. Approved in the UK. Banned in the US and Australia.
E132	Indigo carmine (indigotine, FD&C Blue 2)	Indigo	Approved in the EU and UK. Approved in the US.
E133	Brilliant blue FCF (FD&C Blue 1)	Red-blue to blue	Approved in the EU with conditions. Approved in the UK. Approved in the US.
E134	Spirulina extract		Not approved in the EU and UK. Approved in the US.
E140	(i) Chlorophylls (magnesium chlorophyll) (ii) Chlorophyllins (sodium/potassium chlorophyllin)	(i) Green (ii) Green to blue/black	Approved in the EU with conditions. Approved in the UK. Approved in the US.
E141	(i) Copper complexes of chlorophylls (copper chlorophyll) (ii) Copper complexes of chlorophyllins (sodium/potassium copper chlorophyllin)	(i) Green (ii) Green to blue/black	Approved in the EU with conditions. Approved in the UK. Approved in the US for citrus-based dry beverage mixes.
E142	Green S (FD&C green 4)	Blue to green	Approved in the EU with conditions. Approved in the UK. Not approved in the US.
E143	Fast Green FCF (FD&C Green 3)	Turquoise	Approved in the US. Not approved in the EU and UK.
E150a	Plain caramel	Brown to black	Approved in the EU with only in seaweed based fish roe analogues and only E150a made from honey for a specific type of mead. Approved in the UK. Approved in the US.
E150b	Caustic sulfite caramel	Brown to black	Approved in the EU with conditions. Approved in the UK. Approved in the US.
E150c	Ammonia caramel	Brown to black	Approved in the EU only for breakfast cereals and beer and malt beverages with conditions. Approved in the UK. Approved in the US.
E150d	Sulfite ammonia caramel	Brown to black	Approved in the EU with conditions. Approved in the UK. Approved in the US.
E151	Black PN, Brilliant Black BN	Black-bluish	Approved in the EU only in processed seafood with conditions. Approved in the UK. Banned in the US.
E152	Carbon black, Black 7984 (hydrocarbon)	Black	Not approved in the EU, UK or US. Banned in the EU from 1978.
E153	Vegetable carbon (charcoal)	Black	Approved in the EU with conditions. Approved in the UK. Banned in the US.
E154	Brown FK (kipper brown)	Brown	Previously approved in the EU for dyeing kippers only: approval withdrawn due to deficient toxicology data in November 2011. Not approved in the UK or US.
E155	Brown HT (chocolate brown HT)	Reddish- brown	Approved in the EU in precooked crustacean and in fresh meat only for the purpose of health marking. Approved in the UK. Not approved in the US.
E160a	Carotenes: (i) Beta-carotene (ii) Plant carotenes (iii) Beta-carotene from Blakeslea trispora (iv) Algal carotenes	(i) Red to brown (iii) Red, brown, purple	Approved in the EU with conditions. Approved in the UK. Only beta-carotene is approved in the US
E160b	(i) Annatto bixin (ii) Annatto norbixin	Red-brown to red-purple	Approved in the EU with conditions. Approved in the UK. Approved in the US.
E160c	Paprika extract, capsanthin, capsorubin	Red	Approved in the EU with conditions. Approved in the UK. Approved in the US.
E160d	Lycopene (i) Synthetic lycopene (ii) Lycopene from red tomatoes (iii) Lycopene from Blakeslea trispora	Red	Approved in the EU with conditions. Approved in the UK.Approved in the US.
E160e	Beta-apo-8'-carotenal (C 30)	Violet	Approved in the EU with conditions. Approved in the UK. Approved in the US.
E160f	Ethyl ester of beta-apo-8'-carotenic acid (C 30)	Orange-red to yellow	Not approved in the EU, UK or US.Removed in the EU in 2011 due to no longer being manufactured.
E161a	Flavoxanthin	Golden-yellow and brownish	Not approved in the EU, UK or US.
E161b	Lutein	Yellow-brown	Approved in the EU with conditions. Approved in the UK.Approved in the US for chicken feed only.
E161c	Cryptoxanthin	Orange-red	Not approved in the EU, UK or US.
E161d	Rubixanthin	Orange-red	Not approved in the EU, UK or US.
E161e	Violaxanthin	Orange	Not approved in the EU, UK or US.
E161f	Rhodoxanthin	Purple	Not approved in the EU, UK or US.
E161g	Canthaxanthin	Violet	Approved in the EU for medicinal products only. Approved in the UK. Approved in the US.
E161h	Zeaxanthin	Orange-red	Not approved in the EU, UK or US.Approved in the EU in animal feed in combination with lutein, until 2031.
E161i	Citranaxanthin	Deep violet	Not approved in the EU, UK or US.Approved in the EU in animal feed.
E161j	Astaxanthin	Red	Not approved in the EU and UK. Approved in the US for salmonid fish feed only.
E162	Beetroot Red, Betanin	Red	Approved in the EU with conditions. Approved in the UK. Approved in the US.
E163	Anthocyanins:... (iii) Blackcurrant extract	pH dependent purple-red	Approved in the EU with conditions. Approved in the UK. Grape extract anthocyanin is approved in the US for beverages only.
E164	Saffron	Orange-red^{[colour?]}	Not approved in the EU and UK. Approved in the US.
E165	Gardenia (Genipin) Blue	Blue	Not approved in the EU, UK or US.
E170	Calcium carbonates (Chalk): (i) Calcium carbonate (ii) Calcium hydrogen carbonate	White	Approved in the EU with conditions. Approved in the UK.Approved in the US for dietary supplements, candies and chewing gum only.
E171	Titanium dioxide	White	No longer approved in the EU as of June 2022 for food products, due to the identification of potential carcinogenic effects. Approved in the EU for medicinal products only. Approved in the UK, except Northern Ireland. Approved in the US for specific foods.
E172	Iron oxides and iron hydroxides	yellow, red, brown or black	Approved in the EU with conditions. Approved in the UK. Approved in the US for sausage casings, dietary supplements, candies and chewing gum.
E173	Aluminium	Silver to grey	Approved in the EU only for external coatings of sugar confectionary. Approved in the UK. Not approved in the US.
E174	Silver	Silver	Approved in the EU only for external coatings of confectionary, decoration ofchocolates and liqueurs. Approved in the UK. Not approved in the US.
E175	Gold	Gold	Approved in the EU only for external coatings of confectionary, decoration ofchocolates and liqueurs. Approved in the UK. Not approved in the US.
E180	Pigment Rubine, Lithol Rubine BK	Red	Approved in the EU only in edible cheese rind with conditions. Approved in the UK. Not approved in the US.
E181	Tannin, burnt umber	Brown	Not approved in the EU and UK. Approved in the US. Banned in the EU from 1978.
E182	Orcein, Orchil	Purple	Not approved in the EU, UK or US.Banned in the EU from 1978.
E183	Jagua (genipin-glycine) blue (Jagua blue)	Blue	Not approved in the EU, UK or US.

=== E200–E299 (preservatives) ===
Code	Name(s)	Purpose	Status
E200	Sorbic acid	preservative	Approved in the EU with conditions. Approved in the UK.Approved in the US.
E201	Sodium sorbate	preservative	Not approved in the EU and UK. Approved in the US for food packaging as an antimicrobial agent.
E202	Potassium sorbate	preservative	Approved in the EU with conditions. Approved in the UK.Approved in the US.
E203	Calcium sorbate	preservative	Not aproved in the EU and UK from 2018. Approved in the US.
E209	Heptylparaben (Heptyl p-hydroxybenzoate)	preservative	Not approved in the EU and UK. Approved in the US for certain beverages.
E210	Benzoic acid	preservative	Approved in the EU with conditions. Approved in the UK.Approved in the US.
E211	Sodium benzoate	preservative	Approved in the EU with conditions. Approved in the UK.Approved in the US.
E212	Potassium benzoate	preservative	Approved in the EU with conditions. Approved in the UK.Approved in the US for food packaging as an antimicrobial agent.
E213	Calcium benzoate	preservative	Approved in the EU with conditions. Approved in the UK.Approved in the US for food packaging as an antimicrobial agent.
E214	Ethylparaben (ethyl para-hydroxybenzoate)	preservative	Approved in the EU with conditions. Approved in the UK.Approved in the US.
E215	Sodium ethyl para-hydroxybenzoate	preservative	Approved in the EU with conditions. Approved in the UK. Not approved in the US.
E216	Propylparaben (propyl para-hydroxybenzoate)	preservative	Not approved in the EU and UK. Approved in the US. Removed in the EU in 2006 due to adverse effects on sex hormones in rats.
E217	Sodium propyl para-hydroxybenzoate	preservative	Not approved in the EU, UK or US.Removed in the EU in 2006 due to adverse effects on sex hormones in rats.
E218	Methylparaben (methyl para-hydroxybenzoate)	preservative	Approved in the EU with conditions. Approved in the UK.Approved in the US.
E219	Sodium methyl para-hydroxybenzoate	preservative	Approved in the EU with conditions. Approved in the UK. Not approved in the US.
E220	Sulfur dioxide	preservative	Approved in the EU with conditions. Approved in the UK. Approved in the US except in meats, fresh fruit and vegetables or food sources of vitamin B1.
E221	Sodium sulfite	preservative	Approved in the EU with conditions. Approved in the UK. Approved in the US except in meats, fresh fruit and vegetables or food sources of vitamin B1.
E222	Sodium bisulfite (sodium hydrogen sulfite)	preservative	Approved in the EU with conditions. Approved in the UK. Approved in the US except in meats, fresh fruit and vegetables or food sources of vitamin B1.
E223	Sodium metabisulfite (Sodium pyrosulfite/disulfite)	preservative	Approved in the EU with conditions. Approved in the UK. Approved in the US except in meats, fresh fruit and vegetables or food sources of vitamin B1.
E224	Potassium metabisulfite (Potassium pyrosulfite/disulfite)	preservative	Approved in the EU with conditions. Approved in the UK. Approved in the US except in meats, fresh fruit and vegetables or food sources of vitamin B1.
E225	Calcium metabisulphite (calcium pyrosulfite/disulfite)	preservative	Not approved in the EU and UK. Not approved in the US. Removed in EU in 1971 due to little industrial use.
E226	Calcium sulfite	preservative	Approved in the EU with conditions. Approved in the UK. Approved in the US with conditions.
E227	Calcium bisufite (calcium hydrogen sulfite)	firming agent	Approved in the EU with conditions. Approved in the UK. Not approved in the US.
E228	Potassium bisuflite (potassium hydrogen sulfite)	preservative	Approved in the EU with conditions. Approved in the UK. Approved in the US except in meats, fresh fruit and vegetables or food sources of vitamin B1.
E230	Biphenyl, diphenyl	preservative	Not approved in the EU and UK. Approved in the US in food packaging as an antimicrobial agent. Removed in the EU in 2004, and recategorised as a plant protection product.
E231	Orthophenyl phenol	preservative	Not approved in the EU and UK. Approved in the US in food packaging and food contact products as an antimicrobial agent. Removed in the EU in 2004, as recategorised as a plant protection product.
E232	Sodium orthophenyl phenol	preservative	Not approved in the EU, UK or US.Removed in the EU in 2004, as recategorised as a plant protection product.
E233	Thiabendazole	preservative	Not approved in the EU, UK or US.
E234	Nisin	preservative	Approved in the EU in certain cheese, egg and dessert products. Approved in the UK. Approved in the US in cheese products.
E235	Natamycin, Pimaracin	preservative	Approved in the EU in cheese and dried cured sausages. Approved in the UK. Approved in the US in cheese products.
E236	Formic acid	preservative	Not approved in the EU and UK. Approved in the US.
E237	Sodium formate	preservative	Not approved in the EU and UK. Approved in the US in food packaging as a processing aid.
E238	Calcium formate	preservative	Not approved in the EU, UK or US.
E239	Hexamine (hexamethylene tetramine)	preservative	Approved in the EU only in Provolone cheese. Approved in the UK. Not approved in the US.
E240	Formaldehyde	preservative	Not approved in the EU and UK. Approved in the US in food packaging and food contact products as fumigant.
E242	Dimethyl dicarbonate	preservative	Approved in the EU in some alcoholic beverages and flavoured drinks. Approved in the UK. Approved in the US in certain beverages as an antimicrobial agent.
E243	Ethyl lauroyl arginate	preservative	Approved in the EU in certain heat-treated meat products. Approved in the UK. Not approved in the US.
E246	Glycolipids	preservative	Approved in the EU in some alcoholic beverages and flavoured drinks. Not approved in the UK. Approved in the US in certain beverages as an antimicrobial agent.
E249	Potassium nitrite	preservative	Approved in the EU in certain meat products. In April 2023 the French Court of Appeals of Limoges confirmed that food-watch NGO Yuka was legally legitimate in describing Potassium Nitrite "and other nitrates" E249 to E252 as a "cancer risk", and thus rejected an appeal by the French charcuterie industry against the organisation.Approved in the UK. Approved in the US in certain meat products.
E250	Sodium nitrite	preservative	Approved in the EU in certain meat products. Approved in the UK. Approved in the US in certain meat products.
E251	Sodium nitrate (Chile saltpetre)	preservative	Approved in the EU with conditions. Approved in the UK. Approved in the US in certain meat products.
E252	Potassium nitrate (Saltpetre)	preservative	Approved in the EU with conditions. Approved in the UK. Approved in the US in certain meat products.
E260	Acetic acid (preservative)	acidity regulator	Approved in the EU with conditions. Approved in the UK. Approved in the US.
E261	Potassium acetates (i) Potassium acetate (i) Potassium diacetate	acidity regulator	Approved in the EU with conditions from 2013. Approved in the UK. Approved in the US.
E262	Sodium acetates (i) Sodium acetate (ii) Sodium diacetate (sodium hydrogen acetate)	preservative, acidity regulator	Approved in the EU with conditions. Approved in the UK. Approved in the US with conditions.
E263	Calcium acetate	acidity regulator, preservative	Approved in the EU with conditions. Approved in the UK. Approved in the US with conditions.
E264	Ammonium acetate	preservative	Not approved in the EU and UK. Listed as a food additive in the US but not approved. Approved in Australia and New Zealand
E265	Dehydroacetic acid	preservative	Not approved in the EU and UK. Approved in the US for cut or peeled squash only.
E266	Sodium dehydroacetate	preservative	Not approved in the EU and UK. Approved in the US for cut or peeled squash only.
E267	Buffered vinegar	preservative	Approved in the EU with conditions. Not approved in the UK. Approved in the US.
E270	Lactic acid	antioxidant, preservative	Approved in the EU with conditions. Approved in the UK. Approved in the US.
E280	Propionic acid	preservative	Approved in the EU with conditions. Approved in the UK. Approved in the US.
E281	Sodium propionate	preservative	Approved in the EU with conditions. Approved in the UK. Approved in the US.
E282	Calcium propionate	preservative	Approved in the EU with conditions. Approved in the UK. Approved in the US.
E283	Potassium propionate	preservative	Approved in the EU with conditions. Approved in the UK. Not approved in the US.
E284	Boric acid	preservative	Approved in the EU only in Sturgeons' eggs (caviar). Approved in the UK. Approved in the US for food packaging.
E285	Sodium tetraborate (borax)	preservative	Approved in the EU only in Sturgeons' eggs (caviar). Approved in the UK. Not approved in the US.
E290	Carbon dioxide	acidity regulator	Approved in the EU and UK. Approved in the US.
E295	Ammonium formate		Not approved in the EU, UK or US for food. Originally and currently approved in the EU in animal feed until 2032, under a new identification number.
E296	Malic acid (acid)	acidity regulator	Approved in the EU with conditions. Approved in the UK. Approved in the US with conditions.
E297	Fumaric acid	acidity regulator	Approved in the EU with conditions. Approved in the UK. Approved in the US.

=== E300–E399 (antioxidants, acidity regulators) ===
Code	Name(s)	Purpose	Status
E300	Ascorbic acid (vitamin C), L-ascorbic acid	antioxidant	Approved in the EU with conditions. Approved in the UK. Approved in the US.
E301	Sodium ascorbate	antioxidant	Approved in the EU with conditions. Approved in the UK. Approved in the US.
E302	Calcium ascorbate	antioxidant	Approved in the EU with conditions. Approved in the UK. Approved in the US.
E303	Ascorbyl diacetate	antioxidant	Not approved in the EU, UK or US.Removed in EU in 1981.
E304	Fatty acid esters of ascorbic acid: (i) L-Ascorbyl palmitate (ii) Ascorbyl stearate	antioxidant	Approved in the EU with conditions. Approved in the UK. Approved in the US.
E305	Ascorbyl stearate	antioxidant	Approved under E304 in EU. Approved in the US.
E306	Tocopherol-rich extracts (Vitamin E, natural)	antioxidant	Approved in the EU for certain fats and oils, and foods for infants/young children. Approved in the UK. Approved in the US.
E307	Alpha-Tocopherol (synthetic)	antioxidant	Approved in the EU for certain fats and oils, and foods for infants/young children. Approved in the UK. Approved in the US for inhibition of nitrosamine formation and in pump-cured bacon.
E308	Gamma-Tocopherol (synthetic)	antioxidant	Approved in the EU for certain fats and oils, and foods for infants/young children. Approved in the UK. Approved in the US for inhibition of nitrosamine formation and in pump-cured bacon.
E309	Delta-Tocopherol (synthetic)	antioxidant	Approved in the EU for certain fats and oils, and foods for infants/young children. Approved in the UK. Approved in the US for inhibition of nitrosamine formation and in pump-cured bacon.
E310	Propyl gallate	antioxidant	Approved in the EU with conditions. Approved in the UK. Approved in the US.
E311	Octyl gallate	antioxidant	Not approved in the EU (removed in 2018) and UK. Approved in the US.
E312	Dodecyl gallate	antioxidant	Not approved in the EU (removed in 2018) and UK. Approved in the US.
E313	Ethyl gallate	antioxidant	Not approved in the EU, UK or US.
E314	Guaiac resin	antioxidant	Not approved in the EU and UK. Approved in the US.
E315	Erythorbic acid	antioxidant	Approved in the EU in certain fish and meat products. Approved in the UK. Approved in the US.
E316	Sodium erythorbate	antioxidant	Approved in the EU in certain fish and meat products. Approved in the UK. Approved in the US.
E317	Erythorbin acid	antioxidant	Not approved in the EU, UK or US.
E318	Calcium erythorbin	antioxidant	Not approved in the EU, UK or US.
E319	tertiary-Butylhydroquinone (TBHQ)	antioxidant	Approved in the EU with conditions. Approved in the UK. Approved in the US.
E320	Butylated hydroxyanisole (BHA)	antioxidant	Approved in the EU with conditions. Approved in the UK. Approved in the US with conditons.
E321	Butylated hydroxytoluene (BHT)	antioxidant	Approved in the EU with conditions. Approved in the UK. Approved in the US with conditions.
E322	Lecithins (Phospholipids)	emulsifier	Approved in the EU with conditions. Approved in the UK. Approved in the US with conditions.
E322a	Oat lecithin	emulsifier	Approved in the EU in cocoa products. Not explicitly approved in the UK. Not explicitly approved in the US with conditions.
E323	Anoxomer	antioxidant	Not approved in the EU and UK. Approved in the US.
E324	Ethoxyquin	antioxidant	Not approved in the EU and UK. Approved in the US for chili powder, paprika and in animal feed with conditions.
E325	Sodium lactate	acidity regulator	Approved in the EU with conditions. Approved in the UK. Approved in the US with conditions.
E326	Potassium lactate (antioxidant)	acidity regulator	Approved in the EU with conditions. Approved in the UK. Approved in the US with conditions.
E327	Calcium lactate	acidity regulator	Approved in the EU with conditions. Approved in the UK. Approved in the US with conditions.
E328	Ammonium lactate	acidity regulator	Not approved in the EU, UK or US.
E329	Magnesium DL-lactate	acidity regulator	Not approved in the EU, UK or US.
E330	Citric acid	acid, acidity regulator	Approved in the EU with conditions. Approved in the UK. Approved in the US.
E331	Sodium citrates (i) Monosodium citrate (ii) Disodium citrate (iii) Sodium citrate (trisodium citrate)	acidity regulator	Approved in the EU with conditions. Approved in the UK. Approved in the US.
E332	Potassium citrates (i) Monopotassium citrate (ii) Potassium citrate (tripotassium citrate)	acidity regulator	Approved in the EU with conditions. Approved in the UK. Approved in the US.
E333	Calcium citrates (i) Monocalcium citrate (ii) Dicalcium citrate (iii) Calcium citrate (tricalcium citrate)	acidity regulator, firming agent, sequestrant	Approved in the EU with conditions. Approved in the UK. Approved in the US.
E334	Tartaric acid (L(+)-)	acid	Approved in the EU with conditions. Approved in the UK. Approved in the US.
E335	Sodium tartrates (i) Monosodium tartrate (ii) Disodium tartrate	acidity regulator	Approved in the EU for canned fruit/vegetables, biscuits, rusks and baby foods. Approved in the UK. Approved in the US.
E336	Potassium tartrates (i) Monopotassium tartrate (cream of tartar) (ii) Dipotassium tartrate	acidity regulator	Approved in the EU for sweeteners, canned fruit/vegetables, biscuits, rusks and baby foods. Approved in the UK. Approved in the US with conditions.
E337	Potassium sodium tartrate (Rochelle salt)	acidity regulator	Approved in the EU canned fruit/vegetables only. Approved in the UK. Approved in the US for jams and cheese.
E338	Phosphoric acid	acid	Approved in the EU with conditions. Approved in the UK. Approved in the US.
E339	Sodium phosphates (i) Monosodium phosphate (ii) Disodium phosphate (iii) Trisodium phosphate	antioxidant	Approved in the EU with conditions. Approved in the UK. Approved in the US.
E340	Potassium phosphates (i) Monopotassium phosphate (ii) Dipotassium phosphate (iii) Tripotassium phosphate	antioxidant	Approved in the EU with conditions. Approved in the UK. Approved in the US.
E341	Calcium phosphates (i) Monocalcium phosphate (ii) Dicalcium phosphate (iii) Tricalcium phosphate	anti-caking agent, firming agent	Approved in the EU with conditions. Approved in the UK. Approved in the US.
E342	Ammonium phosphates: (i) monoammonium phosphate (Ammonium dihydrogen phosphate) (ii) diammonium phosphate (Diammonium hydrogen phosphate)	acidity regulator	Not approved in the EU and UK in food. Originally used for animal feed (dogs and cats), removed by 2024. Approved in the US in food.
E343	Magnesium phosphates (i) monomagnesium phosphate (ii) Dimagnesium phosphate	anti-caking agent	Approved in the EU with conditions. Approved in the UK. Approved in the US. This additive is under discussion and may be included in a future amendment to the Directive on miscellaneous additives.
E344	Lecithin citrate	acidity regulator	Not approved in the EU, UK or US.
E345	(i) Trimagnesium dicitrate	acidity regulator	Approved in the EU for supplements. Not approved in the UK or US.
E349	Ammonium malate	acidity regulator	Not approved in the EU, UK or US.
E350	Sodium malates (i) Sodium malate (ii) Sodium hydrogen malate	acidity regulator	Approved in the EU for jams and jellies only. Approved in the UK. Not approved in the US.
E351	Potassium malate	acidity regulator	Approved in the EU and UK. Not approved in the US.
E352	Calcium malates (i) Calcium malate (ii) Calcium hydrogen malate	acidity regulator	Approved in the EU and UK. Not approved in the US.
E353	Metatartaric acid	emulsifier	Approved in the EU for certain wines only. Approved in the UK. Not approved in the US.
E354	Calcium tartrate	emulsifier	Approved in the EU with conditions. Approved in the UK. Not approved in the US.
E355	Adipic acid	acidity regulator	Approved in the EU with conditions. Approved in the UK. Approved in the US with conditions.
E356	Sodium adipate	acidity regulator	Approved in the EU with conditions. Approved in the UK. Not approved in the US.
E357	Potassium adipate	acidity regulator	Approved in the EU with conditions. Approved in the UK. Not approved in the US.
E359	Ammonium adipate	acidity regulator	Not approved in the EU, UK or US.
E363	Succinic acid	acidity regulator	Approved in the EU with conditions. Approved in the UK. Approved in the US in condiments, relishes and meat products.
E365	Sodium fumarate	acidity regulator	Not approved in the EU and UK. Approved in the US.
E366	Potassium fumarate	acidity regulator	Not approved in the EU and UK. Approved in the US.
E367	Calcium fumarate	acidity regulator	Not approved in the EU and UK. Approved in the US.
E368	Ammonium fumarate	acidity regulator	Not approved in the EU, UK or US.
E370	1,4-Heptonolactone	acidity regulator	Not approved in the EU, UK or US.
E372c	Citric acid ester of mono and di-glycerides of food fatty acids (citroglycerides)		Not approved in the EU and UK. Approved in the US as emlusifier.
E375	Niacin	acidity regulator	Not approved in the EU and UK. Approved in the US.
E380	Triammonium citrate	acidity regulator	Approved in the EU in edible caseinates. Approved in the UK. Approved in the US in condiments, relishes and meat products.
E381	Ammonium ferric citrate	acidity regulator	Not approved in the EU and UK. Approved in the US.
E383	Calcium glycerylphosphate	acidity regulator	Not approved in the EU and UK. Approved in the US as a nutrient supplement or in gelatins, puddings, and fillings.
E384	Isopropyl citrate	acidity regulator	Not approved in the EU and UK. Approved in the US in fats, oils, margarine and non-alcoholic beverages.
E385	Calcium disodium ethylene diamine tetraacetate, (Calcium disodium EDTA)	sequestrant	Approved in the EU with conditions. Approved in the UK. Approved in the US with conditions.
E386	Disodium ethylene diamine tetraacetate (Disodium EDTA)	sequestrant	Not approved in the EU and UK. Approved in the US with conditions.
E387	Oxystearin	stabiliser	Not approved in the EU and UK. Approved in the US in vegetable oils.
E388	Thiodipropionic acid		Not approved in the EU and UK. Approved in the US.
E389	Dilauryl thiodipropionate		Not approved in the EU and UK. Approved in the US.
E390	Distearyl thiodipropionate		Not approved in the EU, UK or US.
E391	Phytic acid		Not approved in the EU, UK or US.
E392	Extracts of rosemary (Carnosic acid)		Approved in the EU with conditions. Approved in the UK. Approved in the US.
E399	Calcium lactobionate	Firming agent	Not approved in the EU and UK. Approved in the US in dry pudding mixes.

=== E400–E499 (thickeners, stabilisers, emulsifiers) ===
Code	Name(s)	Purpose	Status
E400	Alginic acid	emulsifier, thickener, stabiliser	Approved in the EU for jams/jellies, desserts and puddings. Approved in the UK. Approved in the US in soups and soup mixes.
E401	Sodium alginate	emulsifier, thickener, stabiliser	Approved in the EU with conditions. Approved in the UK. Approved in the US.
E402	Potassium alginate	emulsifier, thickener, stabiliser	Approved in the EU with conditions. Approved in the UK. Approved in the US.
E403	Ammonium alginate	emulsifier, thickener, stabiliser	Approved in the EU with conditions. Approved in the UK. Approved in the US.
E404	Calcium alginate	emulsifier, thickener, stabiliser	Approved in the EU for jams/jellies, meat preparations, desserts and puddings. Approved in the UK. Approved in the US.
E405	Propane-1,2-diol alginate (Propylene glycol alginate)	emulsifier, thickener, stabiliser	Approved in the EU with conditions. Approved in the UK. Approved in the US with conditions.
E406	Agar (Gelose)	thickener, stabiliser	Approved in the EU for jams/jellies, tablets and fermented creams. Approved in the UK. Approved in the US.
E407	Carrageenan (Irish moss)	emulsifier, thickener, stabiliser	Approved in the EU with conditions. Approved in the UK. Approved in the US.
E407a	Processed eucheuma seaweed (PES)	emulsifier, thickener, stabiliser	Approved in the EU for meat preparations only. Approved in the UK. Approved in the US.
E408	Baker's yeast glycan	emulsifier	Not approved in the EU and UK. Approved in the US in salad dressing, frozen yogurt, sour cream, cheese spread and their analogs.
E409	Arabinogalactan		Not approved in the EU and UK. Approved in the US.
E410	Locust bean gum (Carob/Algaroba gum)	emulsifier, thickener, stabiliser	Approved in the EU with conditions. Approved in the UK. Approved in the US.
E411	Tamarind seed flour	stabiliser	Not approved in the EU and UK in food.Originally approved in animal feed in EU, removed in 2024. Not approved in the US.
E412	Guar gum	stabiliser, thickener	Approved in the EU with conditions. Approved in the UK. Approved in the US.
E413	Tragacanth (thickener) (stabiliser)	emulsifier, thickener, stabiliser	Approved in the EU in sweeteners and meat preparations. Approved in the UK. Approved in the US.
E414	Acacia gum (gum arabic)	emulsifier, thickener, stabiliser	Approved in the EU with conditions. Approved in the UK. Approved in the US with conditions.
E415	Xanthan gum	thickener, stabiliser	Approved in the EU with conditions. Approved in the UK. Approved in the US.
E416	Karaya gum (Katilo, Kadaya)	emulsifier, thickener, stabiliser	Approved in the EU with conditions. Approved in the UK. Approved in the US.
E417	Tara gum	thickener, stabiliser	Approved in the EU and UK. Not approved in the US.
E418	Gellan gum	emulsifier, thickener, stabiliser	Approved in the EU in jams, jellies and sweeteners. Approved in the UK. Approved in the US.
E419	Gum ghatti (thickener) (stabiliser)	emulsifier	Not approved in the EU and UK. Approved in the US.
E420	Sorbitols (gluticol): (i) Sorbitol (ii) Sorbitol syrup	humectant,emulsifier, sweetener	Approved in the EU with conditions. Approved in the UK. Approved in the US with conditions.
E421	Mannitol	sweetener, anti-caking agent	Approved in the EU with conditions. Approved in the UK. Approved in the US with conditions.
E422	Glycerol (glycerin)	emulsifier	Approved in the EU in sweeteners and cocoa products. Approved in the UK. Approved in the US.
E423	Octenyl succinic acid modified gum arabic	emulsifier	Approved in the EU in icing, sauces and certain flavoured drinks. Approved in the UK. Approved in the US.
E424	Curdlan	gelling agent	Approved in the EU with conditions. Not approved in the UK. Approved in the US.
E425	Konjac: (i) Konjac gum (ii) Konjac glucomannan	emulsifier	Approved in the EU with conditions. Approved in the UK. Not approved in the US.
E426	Soybean hemicellulose		Approved in the EU in jelly, frozen egg products and liquid food supplements. Not approved in the UK. Soybean is approved in the US - hemicellulose does not have a specific record in the FDA database.
E427	Cassia gum		Approved in the EU with conditions. Approved in the UK. Not approved in the US.
E428	Gelatin		Not listed in the UK and EU as it is not considered an additive. Approved in the US.
E429	Peptones		Not approved in the EU and UK. Approved in the US.
E430	Polyoxyethylene (8) stearate (emulsifier)	stabiliser	Not approved in the EU, UK or US.
E431	Polyoxyethylene (40) stearate	emulsifier	Approved in the EU. Not approved in the UK. Approved in the US.
E432	Polyoxyethylene sorbitan monolaurate (polysorbate 20)	emulsifier	Approved in the EU with conditions. Approved in the UK. Approved in the US with conditions.
E433	Polyoxyethylene sorbitan mono-oleate (polysorbate 80)	emulsifier	Approved in the EU with conditions. Approved in the UK. Approved in the US with conditions.
E434	Polyoxyethylene sorbitan monopalmitate (polysorbate 40)	emulsifier	Approved in the EU with conditions. Approved in the UK. Approved in the US with conditions.
E435	Polyoxyethylene sorbitan monostearate (polysorbate 60)	emulsifier	Approved in the EU with conditions. Approved in the UK. Approved in the US with conditions.
E436	Polyoxyethylene sorbitan tristearate (polysorbate 65)	emulsifier	Approved in the EU with conditions. Approved in the UK. Approved in the US.
E440	Pectins: (i) pectin (ii) amidated pectin	emulsifier	Approved in the EU with conditions. Approved in the UK. Approved in the US.
E441	Gelatine (emulsifier)	gelling agent	Not listed in the UK and EU as it is not considered an additive. Approved in the US.
E442	Ammonium phosphatides	emulsifier	Approved in the EU in cocoa and chocolate products only. Approved in the UK. Not approved in the US.
E443	Brominated vegetable oil	emulsifier	Not approved in the EU, UK or US.
E444	Sucrose acetate isobutyrate (SAIB)	emulsifier	Approved in the EU for certain cloudy beverages. Approved in the UK. Approved in the US for non-alcoholic beverages.
E445	Glycerol esters of wood rosin (GEWR, Ester gum)	emulsifier	Approved in the EU for certain cloudy beverages and surface treatment of citrus fruit. Approved in the UK. Approved in the US for certain beverages.
E446	Succistearin		Not approved in the EU and UK. Approved in the US for cakes, pastries, filling and toppings.
E450	Diphosphates: (i) Disodium diphosphate (ii) Trisodium diphosphate (iii) Tetrasodium diphosphate (iv) Dipotassium diphosphate (v) Tetrapotassium diphosphate (vi) Dicalcium diphosphate (vii) Calcium dihydrogen diphosphate... (ix) Magnesium dihydrogen diphosphate	emulsifier	Approved in the EU with conditions, except iv. Approved in the UK. Approved in the US for i, iii, iv, v and vi.
E451	Triphosphates: (i) Pentasodium triphosphate (ii) Pentapotassium triphosphate	emulsifier	Approved in the EU in certain fish products. Approved in the UK. Approved in the US.
E452	Polyphosphates: (i) Sodium polyphosphate (ii) Potassium polyphosphate (Kurrol salt) (iii) Sodium calcium polyphosphate (iv) Calcium polyphosphate (v) Ammonium polyphosphate	emulsifier	Approved in the EU in certain fish products (except E452v). Approved in the UK (except E452v). Approved in the US for i and ii.
E455	Yeast mannoproteins		Not approved in the EU, UK or US.
E456	Potassium polyaspartate	emulsifier	Approved in the EU. Not approved in the UK. Not approved in the US.
E457	Alpha-cyclodextrin		Not approved in the EU, UK or US.
E458	Gamma-cyclodextrin		Not approved in the EU, UK or US.
E459	Beta-cyclodextrin	emulsifier	Approved in the EU for flavoured powdered instant drinks and foods in tablet form. Approved in the UK. Approved in the US.
E460	Cellulose: (i) Microcrystalline cellulose, cellulose gel (ii) Powdered cellulose	emulsifier	Approved in the EU with conditions. Approved in the UK. Approved in the US.
E461	Methyl cellulose	emulsifier	Approved in the EU in sweeteners. Approved in the UK. Approved in the US.
E462	Ethyl cellulose	emulsifier	Approved in the EU. Approved in the UK. Approved in the US.
E463	Hydroxypropyl cellulose	emulsifier	Approved in the EU in sweeteners. Approved in the UK. Approved in the US.
E463a	Low-substituted hydroxypropyl cellulose (L-HPC)	emulsifier	Approved in the EU. Approved in the UK. Not approved in the US.
E464	Hypromellose (hydroxypropyl methylcellulose)	emulsifier	Approved in the EU in sweeteners, citrus fruit, melons and pomegranates. Approved in the UK. Approved in the US.
E465	Ethyl methyl cellulose	emulsifier	Approved in the EU in sweeteners. Approved in the UK. Not approved in the US.
E466	Carboxymethyl cellulose, Sodium carboxymethyl cellulose, Cellulose gum (Sodium CMC)	emulsifier	Approved in the EU with conditions. Approved in the UK. Not approved in the US.
E467	Ethyl hydroxyethyl cellulose		Not approved in the EU, UK or US.
E468	Crosslinked sodium carboxymethyl cellulose (Croscarmellose)	emulsifier	Approved in the EU for sweeteners and supplements. This additive is under discussion and may be included in a future amendment to the Directive on miscellaneous additives. Approved in the UK. Not approved in the US.
E469	Enzymatically hydrolysed carboxymethylcellulose	emulsifier	Approved in the EU. Approved in the UK. Not approved in the US.
E470a	Sodium, potassium and calcium salts of fatty acids	emulsifier,anti-caking agent	Approved in the EU for sweeteners and dried herbs/spices. Approved in the UK. Approved in the US.
E470b	Magnesium salts of fatty acids	emulsifier,anti-caking agent	Approved in the EU for sweeteners. Approved in the UK. Approved in the US.
E471	Mono- and diglycerides of fatty acids	emulsifier	Approved in the EU for certain foods. Approved in the UK. Approved in the US.
E472a	Acetic acid esters of mono- and diglycerides of fatty acids	emulsifier	Approved in the EU for certain foods. Approved in the UK. Approved in the US.
E472b	Lactic acid esters of mono- and diglycerides of fatty acids	emulsifier	Approved in the EU for biscuits and rusks, cereal-based foods and baby foods. Approved in the UK. Approved in the US.
E472c	Citric acid esters of mono- and diglycerides of fatty acids	emulsifier	Approved in the EU for certain foods. Approved in the UK. Approved in the US.
E472d	Tartaric acid esters of mono- and diglycerides of fatty acids	emulsifier	Approved in the EU for bread. Approved in the UK. Not approved in the US.
E472e	Mono- and diacetyl tartaric acid esters of mono- and diglycerides of fatty acids (DATEM)	emulsifier	Approved in the EU for bread. Approved in the UK. Not approved in the US.
E472f	Mixed acetic and tartaric acid esters of mono- and diglycerides of fatty acids	emulsifier	Approved in the EU for bread. Approved in the UK. Not approved in the US.
E472g	Succinylated monoglycerides	emulsifier	Not approved in the EU and UK. Approved in the US in bread.
E473	Sucrose esters of fatty acids (Sugar esters)	emulsifier	Approved in the EU for certain foods. Approved in the UK. Approved in the US for certain foods.
E474	Sucroglycerides	emulsifier	Approved in the EU for certain foods. Approved in the UK. Not approved in the US.
E475	Polyglycerol esters of fatty acids	emulsifier	Approved in the EU for certain foods. Approved in the UK. Approved in the US.
E476	Polyglycerol polyricinoleate	emulsifier	Approved in the EU for certain foods. Approved in the UK. Not approved in the US.
E477	Propane-1,2-diol esters of fatty acids, propylene glycol esters of fatty acids	emulsifier	Approved in the EU for certain foods. Approved in the UK. Approved in the US.
E478	Lactylated fatty acid esters of glycerol and propane-1	emulsifier	Not approved in the EU and UK. Approved in the US.
E479b	Thermally oxidized soya bean oil interacted with mono- and diglycerides of fatty acids (TOSOM)	emulsifier	Approved in the EU for fat emulsions only. Approved in the UK. Not approved in the US.
E480	Dioctyl sodium sulfosuccinate	emulsifier	Not approved in the EU and UK. Approved in the US.
E481	Sodium stearoyl-2-lactylate	emulsifier	Approved in the EU for certain foods. Approved in the UK. Approved in the US for certain foods.
E482	Calcium stearoyl-2-lactylate	emulsifier	Approved in the EU for certain foods. Approved in the UK. Approved in the US for certain foods.
E483	Stearyl tartrate	emulsifier	Removed in the EU in 2023 due to lack of toxicology data.However, it is currently approved in animal feed. Approved in the UK. Not approved in the US.
E484	Stearyl citrate	emulsifier	Not approved in the EU and UK. Approved in the US for certain foods.
E485	Sodium stearoyl fumarate	emulsifier	Not approved in the EU, UK or US.
E486	Calcium stearoyl fumarate	emulsifier	Not approved in the EU, UK or US.
E487	Polyethyleneglycol ester of fatty acids from soya oil	emulsifier	Not approved in the EU and UK. Not approved in the US. Originally and currently approved in the EU in animal feed.
E488	Ethoxylated mono- and diglycerides (polyglycerate 60)	emulsifier	Not approved in the EU and UK. Approved in the US for certain foods.
E489	Methyl glucoside-coconut oil ester	emulsifier	Not approved in the EU and UK. Approved in the US for molasses and dextrose/sucrose.
E490	Propane-1,2-diol (propylene glycol)		Approved in EU under E1520. Approved in the US for certain foods.
E491	Sorbitan monostearate	emulsifier	Approved in the EU for certain foods. Approved in the UK. Approved in the US.
E492	Sorbitan tristearate	emulsifier	Approved in the EU for certain foods. Approved in the UK. Not approved in the US.
E493	Sorbitan monolaurate	emulsifier	Approved in the EU for certain foods. Approved in the UK. Not approved in the US.
E494	Sorbitan monooleate	emulsifier	Approved in the EU for certain foods. Approved in the UK. Approved in the US.
E495	Sorbitan monopalmitate	emulsifier	Approved in the EU for certain foods. Approved in the UK. Not approved in the US.
E496	Sorbitan trioleate	emulsifier	Not approved in the EU, UK or US.
E497	Polyoxypropylene-polyoxyethylene polymers		Not approved in the EU and UK. Approved in the US.
E498	Partial polyglycerol esters of polycondensed fatty acids of castor oil		Not approved in the EU, UK or US.
E499	Stigmasterol-rich plant sterols		Approved in the EU for ready-to-freeze alcoholic cocktails. Approved in the UK. Not approved in the US.

=== E500–E599 (acidity regulators, anti-caking agents) ===
Code	Name(s)	Purpose	Status
E500	Sodium carbonates: (i) Sodium carbonate (Soda ash) (ii) Sodium bicarbonate (Baking soda, Sodium hydrogen carbonate) (iii) Sodium sesquicarbonate	raising agent, acidity regulator	Approved in the EU for certain foods. Approved in the UK. Approved in the US.
E501	Potassium carbonates: (i) Potassium carbonate (ii) Potassium bicarbonate (Potassium hydrogen carbonate)	acidity regulator	Approved in the EU for certain foods. Approved in the UK. Approved in the US.
E503	Ammonium carbonates: (i) Ammonium carbonate (ii) Ammonium bicarbonate (Ammonium hydrogen carbonate)	acidity regulator	Approved in the EU for certain foods. Approved in the UK. Approved in the US.
E504	Magnesium carbonates: (i) Magnesium carbonate (hydromagnesite) (ii) Magnesium bicarbonate Magnesium hydrogen carbonate	acidity regulator, anti-caking agent	Approved in the EU for certain foods. Approved in the UK. Approved in the US.
E505	Ferrous carbonate	acidity regulator	Not approved in the EU, UK or US.
E507	Hydrochloric acid	acid	Approved in the EU as a rising agent and pH adjusment for certain foods. Approved in the UK. Approved in the US.
E508	Potassium chloride (Sylvine)	seasoning, thickener	Approved in the EU. Approved in the UK. Approved in the US.
E509	Calcium chloride	firming agent, sequestrant	Approved in the EU for certain foods. Approved in the UK. Approved in the US for certain foods.
E510	Ammonium chloride	improving agent, acidity regulator	Not considered to be a food additive by the legislation definition in 2008 (EU, UK). Approved in the US.
E511	Magnesium chloride	firming agent	Approved in the EU for sea salt only. Approved in the UK. Approved in the US.
E512	Stannous chloride (Tin chloride)	antioxidant	Approved in the EU for canned white asparagus only. Approved in the UK. Approved in the US.
E513	Sulfuric acid (oil of vitriol)	acid	Approved in the EU. Approved in the UK. Approved in the US for alcoholic beverages and cheese.
E514	Sodium sulfates: (i) Sodium sulfate (ii) sodium bisulfate (sodium hydrogen sulfate, Nitre cake)	acid	Approved in the EU. Approved in the UK. Approved in the US for food packaging.
E515	Potassium sulfates: (i) potassium sulfate (ii) potassium bisulfate (potassium hydrogen sulfate)		Approved in the EU. Approved in the UK. Approved in the US nonalcoholic beverages.
E516	Calcium sulfate (Gypsum, selenite, anhydrite)		Approved in the EU. Approved in the UK. Approved in the US for certain foods.
E517	Ammonium sulfate	acidity regulator	Approved in the EU. Approved in the UK. Approved in the US for baked goods, gelatins and puddings.
E518	Magnesium sulfate (Epsom salts), (acidity regulator)	firming agent	Not approved in the EU and UK. Approved in the US.
E519	Copper(II) sulfate	preservative	Not approved in the EU and UK. Approved in the US.
E520	Aluminium sulfate (Alum)	firming agent	Approved in the EU for confectionary and egg whites. Approved in the UK. Approved in the US.
E521	Aluminium sodium sulfate	firming agent	Approved in the EU for confectionary. Approved in the UK. Approved in the US.
E522	Aluminium potassium sulfate (Potash alum)	acidity regulator	Approved in the EU for confectionary and egg whites. Approved in the UK. Approved in the US.
E523	Aluminium ammonium sulfate	acidity regulator	Approved in the EU for confectionary and egg whites. Approved in the UK. Approved in the US.
E524	Sodium hydroxide (caustic soda, lye)	acidity regulator	Approved in the EU for certain foods. Approved in the UK. Approved in the US.
E525	Potassium hydroxide (caustic potash)	acidity regulator	Approved in the EU for certain foods. Approved in the UK. Approved in the US.
E526	Calcium hydroxide (slaked lime, hydrated lime)	firming agent, acidity regulator	Approved in the EU for certain foods. Approved in the UK. Approved in the US.
E527	Ammonium hydroxide (ammonia solution)	acidity regulator	Approved in the EU for certain foods. Approved in the UK. Approved in the US.
E528	Magnesium hydroxide	acidity regulator	Approved in the EU for certain foods. Approved in the UK. Approved in the US.
E529	Calcium oxide (burnt lime)	improving agent, acidity regulator	Approved in the EU. Approved in the UK. Approved in the US.
E530	Magnesium oxide	anti-caking agent, acidity regulator	Approved in the EU for cocoa products and salt. Approved in the UK. Approved in the US.
E534	Iron (III) meso-Tartrate	anti-caking agent	Approved in the EU for salt. Not approved in the UK. Not approved in the US.
E535	Sodium ferrocyanide (yellow prussiate of soda)	anti-caking agent, acidity regulator	Approved in the EU for salt. Approved in the UK. Approved in the US for salt.
E536	Potassium ferrocyanide (yellow prussiate of potash)	anti-caking agent	Approved in the EU for salt. Approved in the UK. Not approved in the US.
E537	Ferrous hexacyanomanganate	anti-caking agent	Not approved in the EU, UK or US.
E538	Calcium ferrocyanide (yellow prussiate of lime)	anti-caking agent	Approved in the EU for salt. Approved in the UK. Not approved in the US.
E539	Sodium thiosulfate	antioxidant	Not approved in the EU and UK. Approved in the US for alcoholic beverages and salt.
E540	Dicalcium ferrocyanide	emulsifier, acidity regulator	Not approved in the EU, UK or US.
E541	Sodium aluminium phosphate, Acidic (SALP)	emulsifier	Approved in the EU for certain baked goods. Approved in the UK. Approved in the US.
E542	Bone phosphate (Tricalcium Phosphate)	anti-caking agent	Approved in the EU and UK under E341(iii). Approved in the US.
E543	Calcium sodium polyphosphate	emulsifier	Not approved in the EU, UK or US.
E544	Calcium polyphosphate	emulsifier	Not approved in the EU, UK or US.
E545	Ammonium polyphosphate	emulsifier	Not approved in the EU, UK or US.
E550	Sodium Silicates (i) Sodium silicate (ii) Sodium metasilicate	anti-caking agent	Not approved in the EU and UK. Approved in the US for food packaging.
E551	Silicon dioxide (Silica)	anti-caking agent	Approved in the EU for certain foods. Approved in the UK. Approved in the US with conditions.
E552	Calcium silicate	anti-caking agent	Approved in the EU for certain foods. Approved in the UK. Approved in the US for salt and baking powder.
E553a	(i) Magnesium silicate (ii) Magnesium trisilicate	anti-caking agent	Approved in the EU for certain foods. Approved in the UK. Approved in the US for salt.
E553b	Talc (talcum)	anti-caking agent	Approved in the EU for certain foods. Approved in the UK. Approved in the US for food packaging and drugs.
E554	Sodium aluminosilicate (sodium aluminium silicate)	anti-caking agent	Approved in the EU for salt. Approved in the UK. Approved in the US.
E555	Potassium aluminium silicate (potassium aluminosilicate)	anti-caking agent	Approved in the EU. Approved in the UK. Not approved in the US.
E556	Calcium aluminosilicate (calcium aluminium silicate)	anti-caking agent	Not authorised in the EU from 31st of January 2014. Approved in the US in salt.
E557	Zinc silicate	anti-caking agent	Not approved in the EU, UK or US.
E558	Bentonite	anti-caking agent	Removed in the EU in 2012 due to no longer being manufactured. Not approved in the UK. Approved in the US.
E559	Aluminium silicate (Kaolin)	anti-caking agent	Not authorised in the EU and UK from 31st of January 2014 in food. Not approved in the US in food. Approved in the EU in animal feed.
E560	Natural mixtures of steatites and chlorite	anti-caking agent	Not approved in the EU, UK or US for food.Originally and currently approved for animal feed in the EU.
E561	Vermiculite	anti-caking agent	Not approved in the EU, UK or US as a food additive.Originally approved in animal feed in the EU, re-authorised under new identification number until 2036.
E562	Sepiolite	anti-caking agent	Not approved in the EU, UK or US in food.Originally approved in animal feed in the EU, re-authorised under new identification number until 2035.
E563	Sepiolitic clay	anti-caking agent	Not approved in the EU, UK or US in food.Originally approved in animal feed in the EU, re-authorised under new identification number until 2033.
E565	Lignosulfonates	anti-caking agent	Not approved in the EU and UK in food.Originally approved in animal feed in the EU, re-authorised under new identification number until 2034. Approved in the US as a pesticide for bananas.
E566	Natrolite-phonolite	anti-caking agent	Not approved in the EU, UK or US for food.Originally and currently approved for animal feed in the EU.
E567	Clinoptilolite of volcanic origin	anti-caking agent	Not approved in the EU, UK or US for food.Originally approved for animal feed in the EU, currently approved under new identification number for poultry and pig feed until 2036.
E570	Fatty acids (C_{8}-C_{18:1}; caprylic acid, lauric acid, capric acid, myristic acid, palmitic acid, stearic acid, oleic acid)	anti-caking agent	Approved in the EU. Approved in the UK. Approved in the US.
E572	Magnesium stearate, calcium stearate (emulsifier)	anti-caking agent	Not approved in the EU and UK. Approved in the US.
E574	Gluconic acid (dextronic acid)	acidity regulator	Approved in the EU. Approved in the UK. Approved in the US as a nutrient supplement.
E575	Glucono delta-lactone (gluconolactone)	sequestrant, acidity regulator	Approved in the EU in certain foods. Approved in the UK. Approved in the US.
E576	Sodium gluconate	sequestrant	Approved in the EU in sweeteners. Approved in the UK. Approved in the US.
E577	Potassium gluconate	sequestrant	Approved in the EU in sweeteners. Approved in the UK. Approved in the US.
E578	Calcium gluconate	firming agent	Approved in the EU in sweeteners. Approved in the UK. Approved in the US for certain foods.
E579	Ferrous gluconate	food colouring	Approved in the EU for fruits/vegetables in canned or pickled form. Approved in the UK. Approved in the US.
E580	Magnesium gluconate		Not approved in the EU and UK. Approved in the US.
E585	Ferrous lactate (iron lactate)	food colouring	Approved in the EU in certain Swedish foods. Approved in the UK. Approved in the US for olives.
E586	4-Hexylresorcinol	antioxidant	Approved in the EU for crustaceans. Approved in the UK. Not approved in the US.
E598	Synthetic calcium aluminates		Not approved in the EU, UK or US.
E599	Perlite		Not approved in the EU, UK or US for foodfood. Used for animal feed, withdrawn in 2023 in the EU but re-authorised in 2026 under a new identification number.

=== E600–E699 (flavour enhancers) ===
Code	Name(s)	Purpose	Status
E620	Glutamic acid	flavour enhancer	Approved in the EU for salt and seasonings. Approved in the UK. Approved in the US for salt.
E621	Monosodium glutamate (MSG)	flavour enhancer	Approved in the EU for salt and seasonings. Approved in the UK. Approved in the US.
E622	Monopotassium glutamate (MPG)	flavour enhancer	Approved in the EU for salt and seasonings. Approved in the UK. Approved in the US.
E623	Calcium diglutamate (calcium glutamate)	flavour enhancer	Approved in the EU for salt and seasonings. Approved in the UK. Not approved in the US, but listed.
E624	Monoammonium glutamate (ammonium glutamate)	flavour enhancer	Approved in the EU for salt and seasonings. Approved in the UK. Approved in the US.
E625	Magnesium diglutamate (magnesium glutamate)	flavour enhancer	Approved in the EU for salt and seasonings. Approved in the UK. Approved in the US.
E626	Guanylic acid	flavour enhancer	Approved in the EU for salt and seasonings. Approved in the UK. Not approved in the US.
E627	Disodium guanylate (sodium guanylate)	flavour enhancer	Approved in the EU for salt and seasonings. Approved in the UK. Approved in the US.
E628	Dipotassium guanylate (potassium guanylate)	flavour enhancer	Approved in the EU for salt and seasonings. Approved in the UK. Not approved in the US.
E629	Calcium guanylate	flavour enhancer	Approved in the EU for salt and seasonings. Approved in the UK. Not approved in the US.
E630	Inosinic acid	flavour enhancer	Approved in the EU for salt and seasonings. Approved in the UK. Not approved in the US.
E631	Disodium inosinate (sodium inosinate)	flavour enhancer	Approved in the EU for salt and seasonings. Approved in the UK. Approved in the US.
E632	Dipotassium inosinate (potassium inosinate)	flavour enhancer	Approved in the EU for salt and seasonings. Approved in the UK. Not approved in the US.
E633	Calcium inosinate	flavour enhancer	Approved in the EU for salt and seasonings. Approved in the UK. Not approved in the US.
E634	Calcium 5'-ribonucleotides	flavour enhancer	Approved in the EU for salt and seasonings. Approved in the UK. Not approved in the US.
E635	Disodium 5'-ribonucleotides (sodium 5'-ribonucleotide)	flavour enhancer	Approved in the EU for salt and seasonings. Approved in the UK. Not approved in the US.
E636	Maltol	flavour enhancer	Not approved in the EU and UK. Approved in the US.
E637	Ethyl maltol	flavour enhancer	Not approved in the EU and UK. Approved in the US.
E640	Glycine and its sodium salt (aminoacetic acid, glycocoll)	flavour enhancer	Approved in the EU for sweeteners. Approved in the UK. Glycine is approved in the US.
E641	L-leucine	flavour enhancer	Approved in the EU for sweeteners. Approved in the UK. Approved in the US.
E650	Zinc acetate	flavour enhancer	Approved in the EU for chewing gum. Approved in the UK. Approved in the US for food packaging.

=== E651–E699 (vitamins, provitamins) ===
Used in animal feed.

Code	Name(s)	Purpose	Status
E670	Vitamin D2 a. 25-hydroxycholecalciferol	vitamin	Approved in the EU in animal feed.
E671	Vitamin D3	vitamin	
E672	Vitamin A		

=== E700–E749 (antibiotics) ===
Originally approved for animal feed. Many of these have been reassigned an identification number to move away from the E number.

Code	Name(s)	Purpose	Status
E700	Bacitracin zinc	antibiotic	
E701	Tetracyclines	antibiotic	
E702	Chlortetracycline	antibiotic	
E703	Oxytetracycline	antibiotic	
E704	Oleandomycin	antibiotic	
E705	Penicillin G potassium	antibiotic	
E706	Penicillin G sodium	antibiotic	
E707	Penicillin G procaine	antibiotic	
E708	Penicillin G benzathine	antibiotic	
E709	Penicillin -G (sodium, procaine)- streptomycin	antibiotic	
E710	Spiramycins	antibiotic	
E711	Virginiamycins	antibiotic	
E712	Flavophospholipol: Flavomycin 40, flavomycin 80	antibiotic	
E713	Tylosin phosphpate	antibiotic	
E714	Monensin A	antibiotic	
E715	Avoparcin	antibiotic	
E716	Salinomycin (Salocin 120 micro Granulate)	antibiotic	
E717	Avilamycin 100/200 (Maxus G100, Maxus G200)	antibiotic	

=== E750 - E799 (Coccidiostats and other medicinal substances) ===
Used in animal feed.

Code	Name(s)	Purpose	Status
E750	Amprolium	coccidiostat	
E751	Amprolium / ethopabate mixture	coccidiostat	
E752	Dinitolmide (DOT)	coccidiostat	
E753	Buquinolate	coccidiostat	
E754	Dimetridazole	coccidiostat	
E755	Meticlorpindol	coccidiostat	
E756	Decoquinate	coccidiostat	
E757	Monensin sodium (Elancoban)	coccidiostat	Approved in the EU in turkey and chicken feed.
E758	Robenidine (Cycostat 66 G)		
E759	Ronidazole		
E760	Ipronidazole		
E761	Meticlorpindol / methylbenzoquate mixture		
E762	Arprinocid		
E763	Lasalocid A sodium (Avatec 15 % cc)		
E764	Halofuginone (Stenorol)		
E765	Narasin (Monteban)	coccidiostat	Approved in chicken feed under a new identification number, until 2036.
E766	Salinomycin sodium (Sacox 120)	coccidiostat	
E768	Nicarbazin		
E769	Nifursol		
E770	Maduramicin (Cygro 1 %)		
E771	Diclazuril (Clinacox 0.5% or 0.2% Premix)		
E772	Narasin - Nicarbazin (Maxiban G160)	coccidiostat	Re-approved in 2026, assigned new identification number.
E773	Semduramicin		Repealed in 2024, approved under a new identification number until 2034.

=== E850-E899 (growth promoters) ===
Used in animal feed originally, although many have been removed since.

Code	Name(s)	Purpose	Status
E850	Carbadox		
E851	Olaquindox		

=== E900–E999 (glazing agents, gases and sweeteners) ===
Code	Name(s)	Purpose	Status
E900	Dimethyl polysiloxane (silicone oil)	anti-caking agent, anti-foaming agent	Approved in the EU for certain foods. Approved in the UK. Approved in the US for food packaging.
E901	Beeswax, white and yellow	glazing agent	Approved in the EU for certain foods. Approved in the UK. Approved in the US.
E902	Candelilla wax	glazing agent	Approved in the EU for certain foods. Approved in the UK. Approved in the US for chewing gum and hard candy.
E903	Carnauba wax	glazing agent	Approved in the EU for certain foods. Approved in the UK. Approved in the US for certain foods.
E904	Shellac	glazing agent	Approved in the EU for certain foods. Approved in the UK. Approved in the US.
E905	Microcrystalline wax (petroleum or hydrocarbon wax, synthetic wax, synthetic paraffin)		Approved in the EU for certain foods. Approved in the UK. Approved in the US.
E905b	Petrolatum		Not approved in the EU and UK. Approved in the US for certain foods.
E905c	Petroleum wax (i)Microcrystalline wax (ii) Paraffin wax	glazing agent	Approved in the EU and UK under E905. Approved in the US for certain foods (petroleum and paraffin).
E905d	High viscosity mineral oils	anti-foaming agent	Not approved in the EU. Not approved in the UK. Approved in the US.
E905e	Medium viscosity mineral oil	anti-foaming agent	Not approved in the EU. Not approved in the UK. Approved in the US.
E906	Gum benzoic	flavour enhancer	Not approved in the EU, UK or US.
E907	Hydrogenated poly-1-decene	glazing agent	Approved in the EU for certain foods. Approved in the UK. Not approved in the US.
E908	Rice bran wax	glazing agent	Not approved in the EU and UK. Approved in the US for chewing gum, candy and fresh fruit/vegetables.
E909	Spermaceti wax	glazing agent	Not approved in the EU, UK or US.
E910	Wax esters	glazing agent	Not approved in the EU, UK or US.
E911	Methyl esters of fatty acids	glazing agent	Not approved in the EU and UK. Approved in the US for raisin making.
E912	Montanic acid esters, Montan acid esters	glazing agent	Removed from the EU in 2014 due to lack o toxicology data. Approved in the US as coating for citrus fruit.
E913	Lanolin, sheep wool grease	glazing agent	Not approved in the EU and UK. Approved in the US for food packaging only.
E914	Oxidized polyethylene wax, oxidized polyethylene	glazing agent	Approved in the EU as coating for certain fruits only. Approved in the UK. Approved in the US as coating for certain fruit.
E915	Esters of colophony	glazing agent	Not approved in the EU and UK. Colophony is approved in the US for food packaging only.
E916	Calcium iodate		Not approved in the EU and UK. Approved in the US for bread.
E917	Potassium iodate		Not approved in the EU and UK. Approved in the US for bread.
E918	Nitrogen oxides		Not approved in the EU and UK. Approved in the US as a propellant.
E919	Nitrosyl chloride		Not approved in the EU, UK or US.
E920	L-cysteine	improving agent	Approved in the EU for biscuits and flour. Approved in the UK. Approved in the US for dough and baked goods.
E921	L-cystine	improving agent	Not approved in the EU and UK. Approved in the US as a nutrient.
E922	Potassium persulfate	improving agent	Not approved in the EU and UK. Approved in the US as coating on citrus fruit and food packaging only.
E923	Ammonium persulfate	improving agent	Not approved in the EU and UK. Approved in the US.
E924	Potassium bromate	improving agent	Not approved in the EU and UK due to being a potential carcinogen. Approved in the US for malting of barley.
E924b	Calcium bromate	improving agent	Not approved in the EU and UK. Approved in the US.
E925	Chlorine	preservative, bleach, improving agent	Not approved in the EU and UK. Approved in the US.
E926	Chlorine dioxide (preservative)	bleach	Not approved in the EU. Not approved in the UK. Approved in the US for treating water.
E927a	Azodicarbonamide	improving agent	Identified as a Substance of Very High Concern in EU.Not approved inthe UK. Approved in the US for flour and bread.
E927b	Carbamide (urea)	improving agent	Approved in the EU for chewing gum. Not approved in the UK. Approved in the US for baked goods, alcohol and gelatin products.
E928	Benzoyl peroxide	bleach, improving agent	Not approved in the EU and UK. Approved in the US for certain foods.
E929	Acetone peroxide		Not approved in the EU and UK. Approved in the US in flour and bread.
E930	Calcium peroxide (improving agent)	bleach	Not approved in the EU and UK. Approved in the US.
E938	Argon	packaging gas	Approved in the EU. Approved in the UK. Not approved in the US.
E939	Helium	packaging gas	Approved in the EU. Approved in the UK. Approved in the US as a processing aid.
E940	Dichlorodifluoromethane	packaging gas	Banned in all countries, in compliance with the Montreal Protocol. Listed by the FDA as a substance added to food (US).
E941	Nitrogen (packaging gas)	propellant	Approved in the EU. Approved in the UK. Approved in the US.
E942	Nitrous oxide	propellant	Approved in the EU. Approved in the UK. Approved in the US in dairy.
E943a	Butane	propellant	Approved in the EU for vegetable oil pan spray. Approved in the UK. Approved in the US.
E943b	Isobutane (2-methyl propane)	propellant	Approved in the EU for vegetable oil pan spray. Approved in the UK. Approved in the US.
E944	Propane	propellant	Approved in the EU for vegetable oil pan spray. Approved in the UK. Approved in the US.
E945	Chloropentafluoroethane	propellant	Banned in all countries, in compliance with the Montreal Protocol. Listed by the FDA as a substance added to food (US).
E946	Octafluorocyclobutane	propellant	Banned in all countries, in compliance with the Montreal Protocol. Listed by the FDA as a substance added to food (US).
E948	Oxygen	packaging gas	Approved in the EU. Approved in the UK. Not listed by the FDA.
E949	Hydrogen	packaging gas	Approved in the EU. Approved in the UK. Not listed by the FDA.
E950	Acesulfame potassium (Acesulfame-K)	sweetener	Approved in the EU for certain foods. Approved in the UK. Approved in the US.
E951	Aspartame (aspartyl phenylalanine methyl ester)	sweetener	Approved in the EU for certain foods. Approved in the UK. Approved in the US.
E952	Cyclamic acid and its sodium and calcium salts (Cyclamate, Cyclohexyslulfamic acid)	sweetener	Approved in the EU for certain foods. Approved in the UK. Prohibited in the US from 1969.
E953	Isomalt	sweetener	Approved in the EU for certain foods. Approved in the UK. Not approved in the US.
E954	Saccharin and its sodium, potassium and calcium salts	sweetener	Approved in the EU for certain foods. Approved in the UK. Approved in the US.
E955	Sucralose (Trichlorogalactosucrose)	sweetener	Approved in the EU for certain foods. Approved in the UK. Approved in the US.
E956	Alitame	sweetener	Not approved in the EU, UK or US.
E957	Thaumatin	flavour enhancer, sweetener	Approved in the EU for certain foods. Approved in the UK. Approved in the US.
E958	Glycyrrhizin	flavour enhancer, sweetener	Not approved in the EU and UK. Approved in the US.
E959	Neohesperidine dihydrochalcone (NHDC, Neohesperidin DC)	flavour enhancer, sweetener	Approved in the EU for certain foods. Approved in the UK. Approved in the US.
E960a	Steviol glycosides from Stevia	sweetener	Approved in the EU for certain foods. Approved in the UK. Not approved in the US.
E960b	Steviol glycosides from fermentation (i) Rebaudioside M produced by Yarrowia lipolytica	sweetener	Approved in the EU for certain foods. Approved in the UK. Not approved in the US.
E960c	Enzymatically produced steviol glycosides: (i) Rebaudioside M by enzyme modification of steviol glycodides (ii) Rebaudioside M by enzymatic conversion of highly purified Rebaudioside A Stevia leaf extracts (iii) Rebaudioside D by enzymatic conversion of highly purified Rebaudioside A Stevia leaf extracts (iv) Rebaudioside AM by enzymatic conversion of highly purified stevioside Stevia leaf extracts	sweetener	Approved in the EU for certain foods. Approved in the UK. Not approved in the US.
E960d	Glucosylated steviol glycosides	sweetener	Approved in the EU for certain foods. Not approved in the UK, approved in Northern Ireland. Not approved in the US.
E961	Neotame	sweetener	Approved in the EU for certain foods. Approved in the UK. Approved in the US.
E962	Aspartame-acesulfame salt (sweetener)	stabiliser	Approved in the EU for certain foods. Approved in the UK. Not approved in the US.
E963	D-Tagatose		Not approved in the EU, UK or US.
E964	Polyglycitol syrup	sweetener	Approved in the EU for certain foods. Approved in the UK. Not approved in the US.
E965	Maltitol: (i) Maltitol (ii) Maltitol syrup (Hydrogenated maltose)	humectant, sweetener, stabiliser	Approved in the EU for certain foods. Approved in the UK. Not approved in the US.
E966	Lactitol	sweetener	Approved in the EU for certain foods. Approved in the UK. Not approved in the US.
E967	Xylitol	sweetener	Approved in the EU for certain foods. Approved in the UK. Approved in the US.
E968	Erythritol (Tetrahydroxybutane)	sweetener	Approved in the EU for certain foods. Approved in the UK. Not approved in the US.
E969	Advantame	sweetener	Approved in the EU for certain foods. Approved in the UK. Approved in the US.
E999	Quillaia extract (Soapbark, Murilla bark)	foaming agent	Approved in the EU for cider, perry, flavoured drinks and food supplements. Approved in the UK. Approved in the US.

=== E1000–E1599 (additional additives) ===
Code	Name(s)	Purpose	Status
E1000	Cholic acid	emulsifier	Not approved in the EU and UK. Approved in the US as a pH control agent.
E1001	Choline salts	emulsifier	Not approved in the EU and UK. Choline chloride approved in the US.
E1100	Amylase	stabiliser, flavour enhancer, enzyme	Not approved in the EU and UK. Approved in the US.
E1101	Proteases: (i) Protease (ii) Papain (iii) Bromelain (iv)Ficin	stabiliser, flavour enhancer, enzyme	Not approved in the EU and UK. Approved in the US.
E1102	Glucose oxidase	antioxidant	Not approved in the EU and UK. Approved in the US.
E1103	Invertase	stabiliser	Approved in the EU. Approved in the UK. Approved in the US.
E1104	Lipases	enzyme	Not approved in the EU and UK. Approved in the US.
E1105	Lysozyme hydrochloride	preservative	Approved in the EU for alcohol and cheese. Approved in the UK. Approved in the US.
E1200	Polydextrose	stabiliser, thickening agent, humectant, carrier	Approved in the EU for certain foods. Approved in the UK. Approved in the US.
E1201	Polyvinylpyrrolidone (PVP, povidone)	stabiliser	Approved in the EU for sweeteners and tablets. Approved in the UK. Approved in the US.
E1202	Polyvinylpolypyrrolidone (crosspovidone, cross-linked polyvidone)	stabiliser, carrier	Approved in the EU for sweeteners and supplements. Approved in the UK. Approved in the US in beverages and vinegar.
E1203	Polyvinyl alcohol (PVA, PVOH)		Approved in the EU for supplements. Approved in the UK. Approved in the US as a solvent.
E1204	Pullulan		Approved in the EU for micro sweets and supplements. Approved in the UK. Approved in the US.
E1205	Basic methacrylate copolymer (BMC)		Approved in the EU for supplements. Approved in the UK. Approved in the US.
E1206	Neutral methacrylate copolymer		Approved in the EU for supplements. Approved in the UK. Approved in the US.
E1207	Anionic methacrylate copolymer		Approved in the EU for supplements. Approved in the UK. Approved in the US.
E1208	Polyvinylpyrrolidone-vinyl acetate copolymer (copolyvidon, copovidone)		Approved in the EU for supplements. Approved in the UK. Not explicitly approved in the US.
E1209	Polyvinyl alcohol-polyethylene glycol-graft- co-polymer		Approved in the EU for supplements. Approved in the UK. Not explicitly approved in the US.
E1210	Carbomer (Polyacrylic acid, PAA)		Approved in the EU for supplements. Not approved in the UK. Not approved in the US.
E1400	Dextrin (Dextrins, roasted starch white and yellow) (stabiliser)	thickening agent	Not considered to be a food additive by the legislation definition in 2008 (EU, UK). Approved in the US.
E1401	Modified starch ((Acid-treated starch) stabiliser)	thickening agent	Not considered to be a food additive by the legislation definition in 2008 (EU, UK). Approved in the US.
E1402	Alkaline modified starch (stabiliser)	thickening agent	Not considered to be a food additive by the legislation definition in 2008 (EU, UK). Not explicitly approved in the US.
E1403	Bleached starch (stabiliser)	thickening agent	Not considered to be a food additive by the legislation definition in 2008 (EU, UK). Approved in the US.
E1404	Oxidized starch (treated with sodium hypochlorite)	thickening agent, emulsifier	Approved in the EU for unflavoured cream, cereals, and milk products for children. Approved in the UK. Approved in the US.
E1405	Enzyme treated starch		Not considered to be a food additive by the legislation definition in 2008 (EU, UK). Approved in the US.
E1410	Monostarch phosphate	thickening agent, stabiliser	Approved in the EU for unflavoured cream, cereals, and milk products for children. Approved in the UK. Approved in the US.
E1411	Distarch glycerol	emulsifier, thickener	Not approved in the EU and UK. Approved in the US.
E1412	Distarch phosphate	thickening agent, stabiliser	Approved in the EU for unflavoured cream, cereals, and milk products for children. Approved in the UK. Approved in the US.
E1413	Phosphated distarch phosphate	thickening agent, stabiliser	Approved in the EU for unflavoured cream, cereals, and milk products for children. Approved in the UK. Approved in the US.
E1414	Acetylated distarch phosphate	thickening agent,emulsifier	Approved in the EU for unflavoured cream, meat preparations, cereals, and milk products for children. Approved in the UK. Approved in the US.
E1420	Acetylated starch (starch acetate)	thickening agent, stabiliser	Approved in the EU for unflavoured cream, cereals, and milk products for children. Approved in the UK. Approved in the US.
E1421	Starch acetate esterified with vinyl acetate	thickening agent, stabiliser	Not approved in the EU, UK or US.
E1422	Acetylated distarch adipate	thickening agent, stabiliser	Approved in the EU for unflavoured cream, cereals, and milk products for children. Approved in the UK. Approved in the US.
E1423	Acetylated distarch glycerol	thickening agent	Not approved in the EU and UK. Approved in the US.
E1430	Distarch glycerol	thickening agent, stabiliser	Not approved in the EU and UK. Approved in the US.
E1440	Hydroxy propyl starch	thickening agent, emulsifier	Approved in the EU for unflavoured live cream products. Approved in the UK. Approved in the US.
E1441	Hydroxy propyl distarch glycerol	thickening agent, stabiliser	Not approved in the EU and UK. Approved in the US.
E1442	Hydroxy propyl distarch phosphate	thickening agent, stabiliser	Approved in the EU for unflavoured live cream and meat preparations. Approved in the UK. Approved in the US.
E1450	Starch sodium octenyl succinate (SSOS)	thickening agent, stabiliser, emulsifier	Approved in the EU for certain foods. Approved in the UK. Approved in the US.
E1451	Acetylated oxidised starch	thickening agent, emulsifier	Approved in the EU for unflavoured live cream and cereals. Approved in the UK. Not explicitly approved in the US.
E1452	Starch aluminium octenyl succinate		Approved in the EU. Approved in the UK. Approved in the US.
E1501	Benzylated hydrocarbons		Not approved in the EU, UK or US.
E1502	Butane-1, 3-diol		Not approved in the EU and UK. Approved in the US.
E1503	Castor oil	resolving agent	Not approved in the EU and UK. Approved in the US.
E1504	(i) Cylcotetraglucose (ii) Cyclotetraglucose syrup	flavour solvent	Not approved in the EU, UK or US.
E1505	Triethyl citrate (ethyl citrate)	foam stabiliser	Approved in the EU in egg whites and supplements. Approved in the UK. Approved in the US.
E1510	Ethanol		Not approved in the EU and UK. Approved in the US in pizza crusts.
E1516	Glyceryl monoacetate	flavour solvent	Not approved in the EU, UK or US.
E1517	Glyceryl diacetate (diacetin)	flavour solvent	Approved in the EU. Approved in the UK. Not approved in the US.
E1518	Glyceryl triacetate (triacetin)	humectant and flavour solvent	Approved in the EU in chewing gum. Approved in the UK. Approved in the US.
E1519	Benzyl alcohol (Phenylcarbinol)		Approved in the EU. Approved in the UK. Approved in the US.
E1520	Propylene glycol (Propane-1,2-diol)	humectant, flavour solvent	Approved in the EU. Approved in the UK. Approved in the US.
E1521	Polyethylene glycol (PEG, Macrogol)		Approved in the EU in sweeteners and supplements. Approved in the UK. Approved in the US.
E1522	Calcium lignosulfonate (40-65)		Not approved in the EU and UK. Approved in the US for food packaging.
E1525	Hydroxyethyl cellulose	thickening agent	Not approved in the EU, UK or US.

=== E1600-E1699 (Enzymes) ===
Used in animal feed, being assigned new identification numbers.

Code	Name(s)	Purpose	Status
E1603	Endo-1,3(4)-beta-glucanase (EC 3.2.1.6) produced by Aspergillus aculeatus (CBS 589.94)		
E1604 (also E1601)	Endo-1,3(4)-betaglucanase and Endo-1,4-betaxylanase		
E1607	Preparation of endo-1,4-beta-xylanase produced by Aspergillus oryzae (DSM 10287)		
E1613	Endo-1,4-beta-xylanase (EC 3.2.1.8 ) produced by Trichoderma longibrachiatum		
E1615	Endo-1,3(4)-betaglucanase (EC 3.2.1.6)	enzyme	
E1616	Endo-1,4-betaglucanase (EC 3.2.1.4)	enzyme	
E1617	Endo-1,4-betaxylanase (EC 3.2.1.8)	enzyme	Repeated as E1625 in other publications.
E1625	Endo-1,4-beta-xylanase	enzyme	
E1639 (also 1600)	3-phytase (EC 3.1.3.8)	enzyme	

=== E1700-E1799 (Micro-organisms) ===
Used in animal feed, being assigned new identification numbers.

Code	Name(s)	Purpose	Status
E1700	Bacillus licheniformis (DSM 5749) and Bacillus subtilis (DSM 5750)		
E1701	Bacillus cereus var. toyoi (NCIMB 40112/ CNCM I – 1012)		
E1702	Saccharomyces cerevisiae (NCYC Sc 47)		
E1706	Enterococcus faecium (DSM 7134) and Lactobacillus rhamnosus (DSM 7133)		
E1707	Enterococcus faecium (DSM 10663)		

== See also ==
- Food Chemicals Codex
- List of food additives
- International Numbering System for Food Additives
- Clean label
