= C24H44O6 =

The molecular formula C_{24}H_{44}O_{6} (molar mass: 428.60 g/mol, exact mass: 428.3138 u) may refer to:

- Sorbitan monooleate
- Triheptanoin (Dojolvi)
