= E105 =

E105 or E-105 may be:

- Fast Yellow AB or E105, a food dye now forbidden in Europe and the United States
- European route E105, a north-south European route connecting Kirkenes in Norway to Yalta in Ukraine
