= Calcium erythorbate =

- Calcium erythorbate

Names
- Preferred IUPAC name Calcium bis{(2R)-2-[(1R)-1,2-dihydroxyethyl]-4-hydroxy-5-oxo-2,5-dihydrofuran-3-olate}
- Other names Erythorbic acid, calcium salt; E318

Identifiers
CAS Number	99552-34-8
3D model (JSmol)	Interactive image
ChemSpider	57566561
EC Number	227-261-5
E number	E318 (antioxidants, ...)
PubChem CID	54737445
CompTox Dashboard (EPA)	DTXSID40726651
- InChI: InChI=1S/2C6H8O6.Ca/c2*7-1-2(8)5-3(9)4(10)6(11)12-5;/h2*2,5,7-10H,1H2;/q;;+2/p-2 Key: BLORRZQTHNGFTI-UHFFFAOYSA-L
- SMILES: OC1=C([O-])[C@]([C@H](O)CO)([H])OC1=O.OC1=C([O-])[C@]([C@H](O)CO)([H])OC1=O.[Ca+2]

Properties
Chemical formula	Ca(C_{6}H_{7}O_{6})_{2}
Molar mass	390.31 g/mol
- Except where otherwise noted, data are given for materials in their standard state (at 25 °C [77 °F], 100 kPa). verify (what is ?) Infobox references

Calcium erythorbate is a food additive. Chemically, it is the calcium salt of erythorbic acid, with the chemical formula Ca(C_{6}H_{7}O_{6})_{2}. As an antioxidant structurally related to vitamin C, it helps improve flavor stability and prevents the formation of carcinogenic nitrosamines.
