= Sodium methylparaben =

Chemical compound

Names
- Preferred IUPAC name Sodium 4-(methoxycarbonyl)phenoxide
- Other names: Sodium methyl p-hydroxybenzoate; Methylparaben sodium salt; E219

Identifiers
CAS Number	5026-62-0
3D model (JSmol)	Interactive image
ChEMBL	ChEMBL2106903
ChemSpider	19863
ECHA InfoCard	100.023.377
EC Number	225-714-1
E number	E219 (preservatives)
KEGG	D02458
PubChem CID	23663626
UNII	CR6K9C2NHK
CompTox Dashboard (EPA)	DTXSID1042156
- InChI: InChI=1S/C8H8O3.Na/c1-11-8(10)6-2-4-7(9)5-3-6;/h2-5,9H,1H3;/q;+1/p-1 Key: PESXGULMKCKJCC-UHFFFAOYSA-M
- SMILES: O=C([O-])C1=CC=C(O)C=C1.[Na+]

Properties
Chemical formula	C_{8}H_{7}NaO_{3}
Molar mass	174.131 g·mol^{−1}

Hazards
- GHS labelling
Pictograms	(GHS05: Corrosive) (GHS07: Exclamation mark)
Signal word	Danger
Hazard statements	H302, H315, H318, H412
Precautionary statements	P264, P270, P273, P280, P301+P312, P302+P352, P305+P351+P338, P310, P321, P330, P332+P313, P362, P501
- Except where otherwise noted, data are given for materials in their standard state (at 25 °C [77 °F], 100 kPa). verify (what is ?) Infobox references

Sodium methylparaben (sodium methyl para-hydroxybenzoate) is the sodium salt of methylparaben with formula Na(CH_{3}(C_{6}H_{4}COO)O).

It is a food additive with E number E219. It is a widely used preservative in the food, pharmaceutical, and cosmetic industries. It serves as an antimicrobial agent that helps extend the shelf life of various products.
