= Stearyl palmityl tartrate =

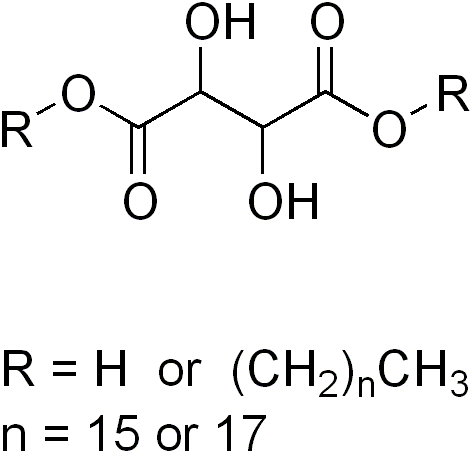

Names
- Other names: Stearyl tartrate; E 483

Identifiers
CAS Number	18,18: 17977-66-1
3D model (JSmol)	16,18: Interactive image; 16,16: Interactive image; 18,18: Interactive image
ChemSpider	16,18: 57500257; 16,16: 64883048; 18,18: 13185066
E number	E483 (thickeners, ...)
PubChem CID	16,18: 74934414; 16,16: 78411268; 18,18: 18000620
- InChI: 16,18: InChI=1S/C38H74O6/c1-3-5-7-9-11-13-15-17-19-20-22-24-26-28-30-32-34-44-38(42)36(40)35(39)37(41)43-33-31-29-27-25-23-21-18-16-14-12-10-8-6-4-2/h35-36,39-40H,3-34H2,1-2H3 Key: NYXFVOZKEYOALB-UHFFFAOYSA-N; 16,16: InChI=1S/C36H70O6/c1-3-5-7-9-11-13-15-17-19-21-23-25-27-29-31-41-35(39)33(37)34(38)36(40)42-32-30-28-26-24-22-20-18-16-14-12-10-8-6-4-2/h33-34,37-38H,3-32H2,1-2H3 Key: XBFGJARWBHKWFU-UHFFFAOYSA-N; 18,18: InChI=1S/C40H78O6/c1-3-5-7-9-11-13-15-17-19-21-23-25-27-29-31-33-35-45-39(43)37(41)38(42)40(44)46-36-34-32-30-28-26-24-22-20-18-16-14-12-10-8-6-4-2/h37-38,41-42H,3-36H2,1-2H3 Key: RYGCHSSZXHQCEJ-UHFFFAOYSA-N
- SMILES: 16,18: CCCCCCCCCCCCCCCCOC(=O)C(O)C(O)C(=O)OCCCCCCCCCCCCCCCCCC; 16,16: CCCCCCCCCCCCCCCCOC(=O)C(O)C(O)C(=O)OCCCCCCCCCCCCCCCC; 18,18: CCCCCCCCCCCCCCCCCCOC(=O)C(O)C(O)C(=O)OCCCCCCCCCCCCCCCCCC

Properties
Chemical formula	C_{40}H_{74}O_{6} to C_{38}H_{78}O_{6}
Molar mass	627 to 655 g/mol
- Except where otherwise noted, data are given for materials in their standard state (at 25 °C [77 °F], 100 kPa). verify (what is ?) Infobox references

Stearyl palmityl tartrate is a derivative of tartaric acid used as an emulsifier. It is produced by esterification of tartaric acid with commercial grade stearyl alcohol, which generally consists of a mixture of the fatty alcohols stearyl and palmityl alcohol. Stearyl palmityl tartrate consists mainly of diesters, with minor amounts of monoester and of unchanged starting materials.

== Use ==
Stearyl palmityl tartrate is used as emulsifier under the E number E 483. The Food and Agriculture Organization of the United Nations sets limits of use at 4 g/kg for bakery wares and 5 g/kg for dessert products.

== Law ==
Use of stearyl palmityl tartrate is prohibited in Australia.
