= Polyethylene wax =

Type of wax

Polyethylene wax can be used as a dispersant, slip agent, resin additive, and mold release agent. As an oxidised product, OPEW is authorized in the EU as E number reference E914 only for the surface treatment of some fruits.

There are a variety of methods for producing Polyethylene wax. Polyethylene wax can be made by direct polymerization of ethylene under special conditions that control molecular weight and chain branching of the final polymer. Another method involves thermal and/or mechanical decomposition of high molecular weight polyethylene resin to create lower molecular weight fractions. A third method involves separation of the low molecular weight fraction from a production stream of high molecular weight polymer. These last two methods produce very low molecular weight fractions that should be removed to avoid a product with low flash point that can result in flammability, migration, equipment build up, fouling and other safety and processing issues. Volatiles in these un refined waxes can also account for significant yield loss during processing

Polyethylene wax may be used as lubricant additive to PVC pipes. It can also be used as a coating for moulded fibre or paper-based products.

Molecular structure of polyethylene wax. The structure is the same as normal polyethylene, although the polymer chains (n) are generally much lower for polyethylene wax compared to normal polyethylene
