= Starch sodium octenyl succinate =

Modified starch

Starch sodium octenyl succinate, E1450 in the E number scheme of food additives, is a modified starch. These are not absorbed intact by the gut, but are significantly hydrolysed by intestinal enzymes and then fermented by intestinal microbiota.
