= Dipotassium guanylate =

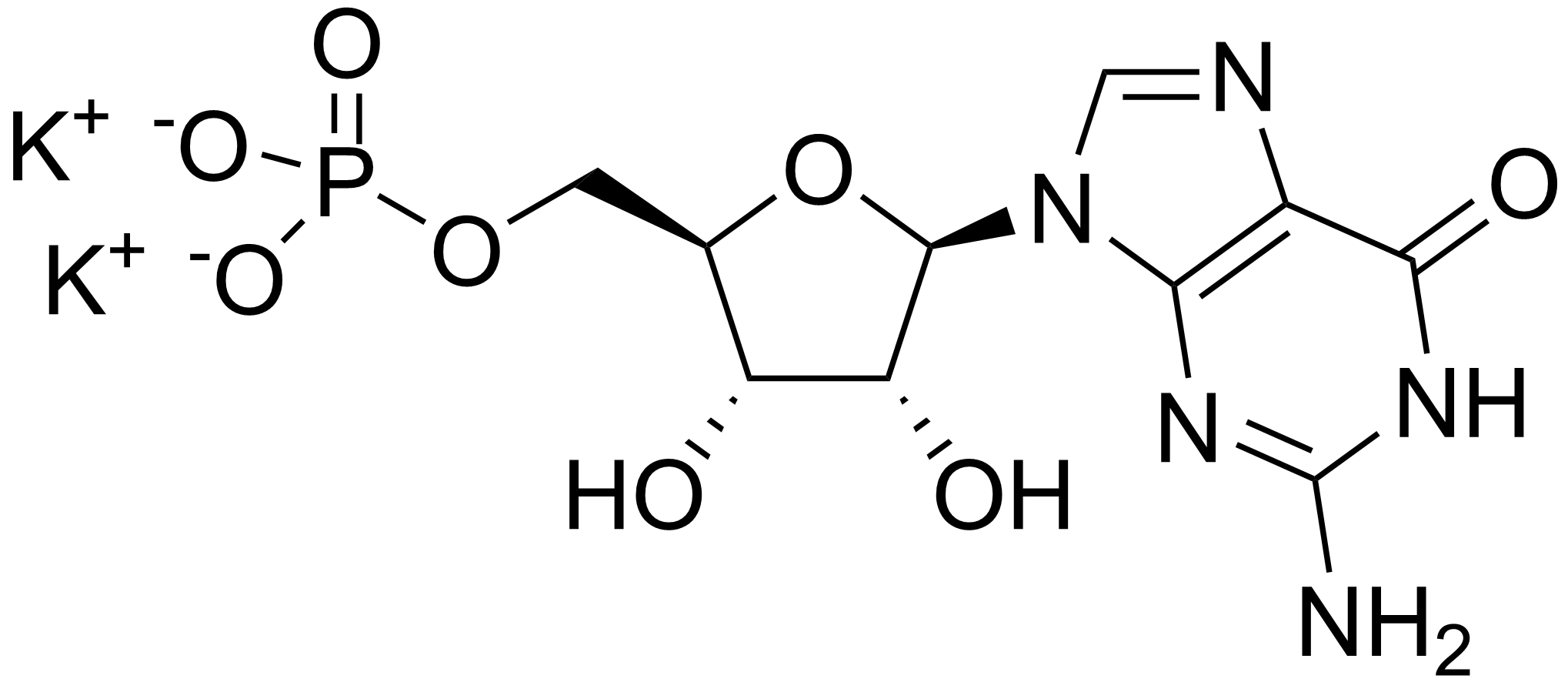

Names
- IUPAC name Dipotassium 5′-guanylate
- Systematic IUPAC name Dipotassium [(2R,3S,4R,5R)-5-(2-amino-6-oxo-1,6-dihydro-9H-purin-9-yl)-3,4-dihydroxyoxolan-2-yl]methyl phosphate
- Other names: 5′-Guanosine monophosphate dipotassium salt; 5′-Guanylic acid dipotassium salt; E628

Identifiers
CAS Number	3254-39-5
3D model (JSmol)	Interactive image
ChemSpider	18598953
ECHA InfoCard	100.019.863
EC Number	221-849-5
E number	E628 (flavour enhancer)
PubChem CID	22841446
UNII	R87C8160YV
CompTox Dashboard (EPA)	DTXSID80954279
- InChI: InChI=1S/C10H14N5O8P.2K/c11-10-13-7-4(8(18)14-10)12-2-15(7)9-6(17)5(16)3(23-9)1-22-24(19,20)21;;/h2-3,5-6,9,16-17H,1H2,(H2,19,20,21)(H3,11,13,14,18);;/q;2*+1/p-2/t3-,5-,6-,9-;;/m1../s1 Key: BCQFRUIIFOQGFI-LGVAUZIVSA-L; InChI=1/C10H14N5O8P.2K/c11-10-13-7-4(8(18)14-10)12-2-15(7)9-6(17)5(16)3(23-9)1-22-24(19,20)21;;/h2-3,5-6,9,16-17H,1H2,(H2,19,20,21)(H3,11,13,14,18);;/q;2*+1/p-2/t3-,5-,6-,9-;;/m1../s1 Key: BCQFRUIIFOQGFI-QZORJYQDBD
- SMILES: O[C@H]1[C@@H](O)[C@H](N2C=NC3=C2NC(N)=NC3=O)O[C@@H]1COP([O-])([O-])=O.[K+].[K+]

Properties
Chemical formula	C_{10}H_{12}K_{2}N_{5}O_{8}P
Molar mass	439.403 g·mol^{−1}
- Except where otherwise noted, data are given for materials in their standard state (at 25 °C [77 °F], 100 kPa). verify (what is ?) Infobox references

Dipotassium guanylate is a compound with formula K_{2}(C_{10}H_{12}O_{4}N_{5}PO_{4}). It is a potassium salt of guanylic acid.

As a food additive, it is used as a flavor enhancer and has the E number E628.
