= Acetylated distarch phosphate =

Names
- Other names: Starch, hydrogen phosphate acetate

Identifiers
CAS Number	68130-14-3
E number	E1414 (additional chemicals)
CompTox Dashboard (EPA)	DTXSID7096836

Properties
Appearance	White powder
- Except where otherwise noted, data are given for materials in their standard state (at 25 °C [77 °F], 100 kPa). Infobox references

Acetylated distarch phosphate, E1414 in the E number scheme of food additives, is a modified starch. These are not absorbed intact by the gut, but are significantly hydrolysed by intestinal enzymes and then fermented by intestinal microbiota.
