= Calcium glycerylphosphate =

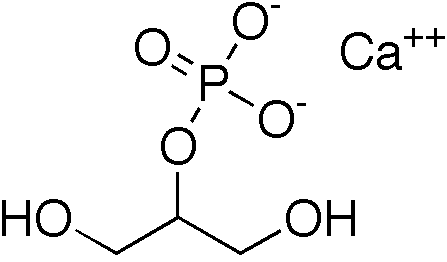

Names
- Preferred IUPAC name Calcium 1,3-dihydroxypropan-2-yl phosphate

Identifiers
CAS Number	27214-00-2
3D model (JSmol)	Interactive image
ChEBI	CHEBI:31336
ChEMBL	ChEMBL3707206
ChemSpider	56554
DrugBank	DB11264
ECHA InfoCard	100.055.654
EC Number	261-240-1
E number	E383 (antioxidants, ...)
KEGG	C12935
PubChem CID	62820
UNII	XWV9Z12C1C
CompTox Dashboard (EPA)	DTXSID1048962
- InChI: InChI=1S/C3H9O6P.Ca/c4-1-3(2-5)9-10(6,7)8;/h3-5H,1-2H2,(H2,6,7,8);/q;+2/p-2 Key: UHHRFSOMMCWGSO-UHFFFAOYSA-L; InChI=1/C3H9O6P.Ca/c4-1-3(2-5)9-10(6,7)8;/h3-5H,1-2H2,(H2,6,7,8);/q;+2/p-2 Key: UHHRFSOMMCWGSO-NUQVWONBAR
- SMILES: [Ca+2].[O-]P([O-])(=O)OC(CO)CO

Properties
Chemical formula	C_{3}H_{7}CaO_{6}P
Molar mass	210.135 g·mol^{−1}
Solubility in water	54.3 g/L

Pharmacology
ATC code	A12AA08 (WHO)

Hazards
- GHS labelling
Pictograms	(GHS07: Exclamation mark)
Signal word	Warning
Hazard statements	H315, H319, H335
Precautionary statements	P261, P264, P271, P280, P302+P352, P304+P340, P305+P351+P338, P312, P321, P332+P313, P337+P313, P362, P403+P233, P405, P501
- Except where otherwise noted, data are given for materials in their standard state (at 25 °C [77 °F], 100 kPa). verify (what is ?) Infobox references

Calcium glycerylphosphate (or calcium glycerophosphate) is a mineral supplement. Formerly it was sold as a nerve tonic. It is added to some kinds of toothpaste.
