= Lecithin citrate =

Food additive

Lecithin citrate is a food additive used as a preservative. Its E number is 344. It is not approved for use in the UK.
