= Calcium fumarate =

- Skeletal formula of calcium fumarate

Identifiers
CAS Number	19855-56-2
3D model (JSmol)	Interactive image
ChemSpider	4952853
ECHA InfoCard	100.039.418
EC Number	243-376-3
E number	E367 (antioxidants, ...)
MeSH	calcium+fumarate
PubChem CID	6433512
UNII	VD906S8V0I
- InChI: InChI=1S/C4H4O4.Ca/c5-3(6)1-2-4(7)8;/h1-2H,(H,5,6)(H,7,8);/q;+2/p-2/b2-1-; Key: HDRTWMBOUSPQON-ODZAUARKSA-L
- SMILES: O=C1O[Ca]OC(=O)\C=C\1

Properties
Chemical formula	CaC_{4}H_{2}O_{4}
Molar mass	154.134 g mol^{−1}

Hazards
- GHS labelling
Pictograms	(GHS07: Exclamation mark)
Signal word	Warning
Hazard statements	H319
Precautionary statements	P264, P280, P305+P351+P338, P337+P313
- Except where otherwise noted, data are given for materials in their standard state (at 25 °C [77 °F], 100 kPa). verify (what is ?) Infobox references

Calcium fumarate is a compound with formula Ca(C_{2}H_{2}(COO)_{2}) or (OOC-CH=CH-COO)Ca. It is a calcium salt of fumaric acid, and has been used to enrich foods to boost calcium absorption.

It has E number "E367".
