= Calcium ferrocyanide =

Chemical compound

Names
- Other names: Dicalcium hexakis(cyano-κC)ferrate(4-)

Identifiers
| CAS Number | 13821-08-4 |
| 3D model (JSmol) | Interactive image |
| ChemSpider | 146050 |
| ECHA InfoCard | 100.034.085 |
| EC Number | 237-508-9 |
| E number | E538 (acidity regulators, ...) |
| PubChem CID | 166920 |
| UNII | 906D36VLZG |
| CompTox Dashboard (EPA) | DTXSID80930018 |
- InChI: InChI=1S/6CN.2Ca.Fe/c6*1-2;;;/q6*-1;3*+2 Key: BAZQCHGUTMBXBU-UHFFFAOYSA-N
- SMILES: [C-]#N.[C-]#N.[C-]#N.[C-]#N.[C-]#N.[C-]#N.[Ca+2].[Ca+2].[Fe+2]

Properties
| Chemical formula | C_{6}Ca_{2}FeN_{6} |
| Molar mass | 292.109 g·mol^{−1} |

Hazards
- GHS labelling
| Pictograms | (GHS07: Exclamation mark) |
| Signal word | Warning |
| Hazard statements | H302, H312, H315, H319, H332, H335 |
| Precautionary statements | P261, P280, P301+P312, P302+P352, P304+P340, P305+P351+P338, P332+P313 |
| NFPA 704 (fire diamond) | 0 0 |
- Except where otherwise noted, data are given for materials in their standard state (at 25 °C [77 °F], 100 kPa). Infobox references

Calcium ferrocyanide is an inorganic compound with the formula Ca_{2}[Fe(CN)_{6}]. It is the Ca^{2+} salt of [Fe(CN)_{6}]^{4-}, ferrocyanide complex ion. It is insoluble in water, acids, and organic solvents. A yellow solid, it is used as a precursor to the pigment Prussian blue.

== Safety ==
It was listed in 2012 by the EU as a "Food Improvement Agent".

In the EU, ferrocyanides (E 535–538) were, as of 2018, solely authorised in two food categories as salt substitutes. Kidneys are the organ for ferrocyanide toxicity.
