= Ammonium adipate =

Names
- Preferred IUPAC name Bis(azanium) hexanedioate
- Other names Diammonium adipate; Ammonium hexanedioate; E359

Identifiers
| CAS Number | 3385-41-9 |
| 3D model (JSmol) | Interactive image |
| ChemSpider | 146777 |
| ECHA InfoCard | 100.020.180 |
| E number | E359 (antioxidants, ...) |
| PubChem CID | 167786 |
| UNII | 9VH76YE3HU |
| CompTox Dashboard (EPA) | DTXSID30889466 |
- InChI: InChI=1S/C6H10O4.2H3N/c7-5(8)3-1-2-4-6(9)10;;/h1-4H2,(H,7,8)(H,9,10);2*1H3 Key: ZRSKSQHEOZFGLJ-UHFFFAOYSA-N; InChI=1/C6H10O4.2H3N/c7-5(8)3-1-2-4-6(9)10;;/h1-4H2,(H,7,8)(H,9,10);2*1H3 Key: ZRSKSQHEOZFGLJ-UHFFFAOYAK
- SMILES: [O-]C(=O)CCCCC(=O)[O-].[NH4+].[NH4+]

Properties
| Chemical formula | C_{6}H_{16}N_{2}O_{4} |
| Molar mass | 180.204 g·mol^{−1} |
- Except where otherwise noted, data are given for materials in their standard state (at 25 °C [77 °F], 100 kPa). verify (what is ?) Infobox references

Ammonium adipate is a compound with formula (NH_{4})_{2}(C_{4}H_{8}(COO)_{2}). It is the ammonium salt of adipic acid. It is a food additive used as an acidity regulator and has the E number E359.
