= Polyoxyethylene stearate =

Identifiers
CAS Number	9004-99-3
ChEBI	CHEBI:32027
ECHA InfoCard	100.113.146
E number	E431 (thickeners, ...)
UNII	0V73PIX5YC
CompTox Dashboard (EPA)	DTXSID6027715
- Except where otherwise noted, data are given for materials in their standard state (at 25 °C [77 °F], 100 kPa). Infobox references

Polyoxyethylene stearate is a non-ionic surfactant, which is permitted for use as the E number food additive E431.
