= Monostarch phosphate =

Modified starch used as a food additive

Monostarch phosphate, E1410 in the E number scheme of food additives, is a modified starches. These are not absorbed intact by the gut, but are significantly hydrolysed by intestinal enzymes and then fermented by intestinal microbiota.
