= Mixed ammonium salts of phosphorylated glycerides =

Food additive

The mix of ammonium salts of phosphorylated glycerides can be either made synthetically or from mixture of glycerol and partially hardened plant (most often used: rapeseed oil) oils.

== Applications ==
It is most often used in chocolate industry as an emulsifier, often as alternative to lecithin.

== Properties ==
At room temperature it can occur as yellowish to light-brown semi-solid or oily liquid, depending on their fatty acid composition and melting point.

== Synonyms ==
- Ammonium phosphatide
- Emulsifier YN
- E number E442

== See also ==
- Polyglycerol polyricinoleate (PGPR)
