= Acetylated monoglyceride =

- Typical components of acetylated monoglycerides, where R is a variable fatty acid side chain

Identifiers
CAS Number	308068-38-4
E number	E472a (thickeners, ...)
UNII	5Z17386USF

Properties
Chemical formula	Variable
Molar mass	Variable
- Except where otherwise noted, data are given for materials in their standard state (at 25 °C [77 °F], 100 kPa). Infobox references

Acetylated monoglycerides are a class of chemical compounds used as food additives and as plasticizers.

Chemically, acetylated monoglycerides are mixtures derived from monoglycerides that have been modified with one or two acetyl groups. The fatty acid side chains of the monoglyceride can be varied to give differing properties.

As a food additive it has the E number E472a and is used as an emulsifier and in edible coatings.

Acetylated monoglycerides can also be used as plasticizers.
