= Octenyl succinic acid modified gum arabic =

Food additive

Names
- Other names: Gum arabic hydrogen octenylbutandioate; Gum arabic hydrogen octenylsuccinate; OSA modified gum arabic

Identifiers
CAS Number	455885-22-0
E number	E423 (thickeners, ...)

Properties
Appearance	Off-white to light tan, free flowing powder
Solubility in water	Freely soluble
- Except where otherwise noted, data are given for materials in their standard state (at 25 °C [77 °F], 100 kPa). Infobox references

Octenyl succinic acid modified gum Arabic is known to the FAO as a food additive. It has E number E423, and is a chemical modification of gum arabic.

== Synopsis ==
It is a free flowing powder at STP, and has off-white to light tan colour. It has functionality as an emulsifier and is freely soluble in water.
