= Glyceryl diacetate =

1,2-glyceryl diacetate
1,3-glyceryl diacetate

Names
- Other names Diacetin; Glycerol diacetate

Identifiers
CAS Number	25395-31-7 (mixture); 102-62-5 (1,2); 105-70-4 (1,3)
3D model (JSmol)	Interactive image
ChemSpider	59412 (1,2); 60286 (1,3)
ECHA InfoCard	100.042.659
EC Number	246-941-2
E number	E1517 (additional chemicals)
PubChem CID	66021 (1,2); 66924 (1,3)
RTECS number	AK3325000
UNII	GJ0544W99Q (mixture); 9W955270ZW (1,2); G45CU3Z186 (1,3)
CompTox Dashboard (EPA)	DTXSID5041223
- InChI: InChI=1S/C7H12O5/c1-5(9)11-4-7(3-8)12-6(2)10/h7-8H,3-4H2,1-2H3 Key: UXDDRFCJKNROTO-UHFFFAOYSA-N
- SMILES: CC(=O)OCC(CO)OC(=O)C

Properties
Chemical formula	C_{7}H_{12}O_{5}
Molar mass	176.168 g·mol^{−1}
Melting point	−30 °C (−22 °F; 243 K)
Boiling point	280 °C (536 °F; 553 K)
- Except where otherwise noted, data are given for materials in their standard state (at 25 °C [77 °F], 100 kPa). Infobox references

Glyceryl diacetate is a food additive with the E number E1517. This diglyceride is more generally known as diacetin. It is the diester of glycerol and acetylating agents, such as acetic acid and acetic anhydride. It is a colorless, viscous and odorless liquid with a high boiling point. Glycerol diacetate is typically a mixture of two isomers, 1,2-glyceryl diacetate and 1,3-glyceryl diacetate.

== See also ==
- Glycerine acetate
- Triacetin
