= Hydrogenated polydec-1-ene =

Names
- Other names: Hydrogenated poly-1-decenes; Hydrogenated poly-alpha-olefin; Crystalline wax; E907

Identifiers
| CAS Number | 68037-01-4 |
| ECHA InfoCard | 100.105.676 |
| EC Number | 500-183-1 |
| E number | E907 (glazing agents, ...) |
| UNII | 4U179ML4TJ |
| CompTox Dashboard (EPA) | DTXSID60895035 |

Properties
| Chemical formula | C_{10n}H_{20n+2}, where n = 3-6 |
| Molar mass | 550 g/mol (average) |
| Appearance | Colorless viscous liquid |
| Odor | Odorless |
| Solubility in water | Insoluble |
- Except where otherwise noted, data are given for materials in their standard state (at 25 °C [77 °F], 100 kPa). Infobox references

Hydrogenated poly-1-decene is a colourless glazing agent. It is "a mixture of isoparaffinic molecules of known structure, prepared by hydrogenation of mixtures of tri-, tetra- penta- and hexa-1-decenes". It was reviewed in 2001 by the Scientific Committee on Food of the DG Health. It was "proposed as a substitute for white mineral oil. The food additive applications include those of glazing agent for confectionery and dried fruit, and processing aid uses as a lubricant and release agent, especially in bread baking using tins. It has been permitted for use in Finland, and a “Case of Need” has been accepted in the United Kingdom." The substance is a mix of inert saturated hydrocarbons, which are not easily metabolised.
