= Potassium fumarate =

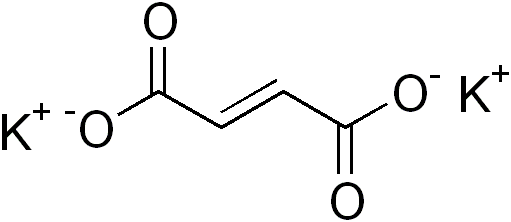

Names
- Preferred IUPAC name Dipotassium (2E)-but-2-enedioate
- Other names potassium fumarate, potassium (E)-butenedioate, Dipotassium fumarate, Fumaric acid, EINECS 223-979-8, 4151-35-3, 7704-72-5

Identifiers
CAS Number	7704-72-5
3D model (JSmol)	Interactive image
ChemSpider	4938656
ECHA InfoCard	100.119.574
E number	E366 (antioxidants, ...)
PubChem CID	6433511
UNII	8Z42Z85852
CompTox Dashboard (EPA)	DTXSID40894985
- InChI: InChI=1S/C4H4O4.2K/c5-3(6)1-2-4(7)8;;/h1-2H,(H,5,6)(H,7,8);;/q;2*+1/p-2/b2-1+;; Key: SHPKCSFVQGSAJU-SEPHDYHBSA-L; InChI=1/C4H4O4.2K/c5-3(6)1-2-4(7)8;;/h1-2H,(H,5,6)(H,7,8);;/q;2*+1/p-2/b2-1+;; Key: SHPKCSFVQGSAJU-HYKNURKJBN
- SMILES: [K+].[K+].[O-]C(=O)\C=C\C([O-])=O

Properties
Chemical formula	K_{2}C_{4}H_{2}O_{4}
Molar mass	192.253g/mol
- Except where otherwise noted, data are given for materials in their standard state (at 25 °C [77 °F], 100 kPa). verify (what is ?) Infobox references

Potassium fumarate is a compound with formula K_{2}C_{4}H_{2}O_{4}. It is the potassium salt of fumaric acid. It has E number "E366".
