= Sodium dehydroacetate =

- Chemical structure of sodium dehydroacetate

Names
- Other names E266

Identifiers
CAS Number	4418-26-2
3D model (JSmol)	Interactive image
ChemSpider	21172046
ECHA InfoCard	100.022.347
EC Number	224-580-1
E number	E266 (preservatives)
PubChem CID	44135708
UNII	8W46YN971G
CompTox Dashboard (EPA)	DTXSID7026029
- InChI: Key: DSOWAKKSGYUMTF-UHFFFAOYSA-M; InChI=1S/C8H8O4.Na/c1-4-3-6(10)7(5(2)9)8(11)12-4;/h3,9H,1-2H3;/q;+1/p-1
- SMILES: CC1=CC(=O)C(=C(C)[O-])C(=O)O1.[Na+]

Properties
Chemical formula	C_{8}H_{7}NaO_{4}
Molar mass	190.130 g·mol^{−1}
- Except where otherwise noted, data are given for materials in their standard state (at 25 °C [77 °F], 100 kPa). verify (what is ?) Infobox references

Sodium dehydroacetate is a compound with the formula Na(CH_{3}C_{5}HO(O_{2})(CH_{3})CO). It is the sodium salt of dehydroacetic acid. It is used as a preservative in food, cosmetics and personal care products such as shower gels, which is highly effective against a broad range of bacteria even at low concentrations such as 0.075 g/kg in meat. Its use is regulated in China, Japan and the USA, thus it can only be used in certain foods such as pickled vegetables, fermented soy, compound seasonings and pickled mushrooms in China, and only peeled pumpkins in the US at 65 parts per million. It is not approved for use in the EU. It adds an acetic odor to food which can be mitigated using flavorings. It can also be used in bread and pastries. It is highly effective when applied to oranges.

It has E number E266.
