= Polyglycitol syrup =

Names
- Other names Hydrogenated starch hydrolysate; Hydrogenated starch syrup

Identifiers
| CAS Number | 68425-17-2 |
| ECHA InfoCard | 100.063.924 |
| E number | E964 (glazing agents, ...) |
| UNII | 27F77DSJ5V |
| CompTox Dashboard (EPA) | DTXSID1028495 |
- Except where otherwise noted, data are given for materials in their standard state (at 25 °C [77 °F], 100 kPa). Infobox references

Polyglycitol syrup has uses as a food additive, and is also known as E964. It is a mixture of maltitol and sorbitol, two sugar alcohols.
