= Ammonium malate =

Names
- IUPAC name Diammonium malate
- Other names Ammonium hydroxybutanedioate; E349

Identifiers
CAS Number	6283-27-8
3D model (JSmol)	Interactive image
ChemSpider	14741352
ECHA InfoCard	100.025.909
EC Number	228-499-2
E number	E349 (antioxidants, ...)
PubChem CID	13644148
UNII	2P5380J2SK
CompTox Dashboard (EPA)	DTXSID90889508
- InChI: InChI=1S/C4H6O5.2H3N/c5-2(4(8)9)1-3(6)7;;/h2,5H,1H2,(H,6,7)(H,8,9);2*1H3 Key: KGECWXXIGSTYSQ-UHFFFAOYSA-N
- SMILES: C(C(C(=O)[O-])O)C(=O)[O-].[NH4+].[NH4+]

Properties
Chemical formula	C_{4}H_{9}NO_{5}
Molar mass	151.118 g·mol^{−1}
Appearance	white solid
Density	1.498 g/cm^{3} (monohydrate)
- Except where otherwise noted, data are given for materials in their standard state (at 25 °C [77 °F], 100 kPa). verify (what is ?) Infobox references

Ammonium malate refers to organic compounds containing malate and ammonium. Two stoichiometries are discussed: NH_{4}H(C_{2}H_{3}OH(CO_{2})_{2}) with one ammonium ion per formula unit, and (NH_{4})_{2}(C_{2}H_{3}OH(CO_{2})_{2}). Malate, the conjugate base of malic acid, is chiral. Consequently a variety of salts are possible, R vs S vs racemic. The monoammonium salt has been crystallized as the monohydrate.

As a food additive, diammonium malate has been used as flavoring agent and as an acidity regulator. It has the E number E349.
