= Ammonium fumarate =

Chemical compound

Names
- Systematic IUPAC name Ammonium (E)-but-2-enedioate
- Other names Diammonium fumarate; E368

Identifiers
CAS Number	14548-85-7 (2:1 salt); 32378-54-4 (unspecified salt)
3D model (JSmol)	Interactive image
ChemSpider	4945093
ECHA InfoCard	100.035.070
E number	E368 (antioxidants, ...)
PubChem CID	6440849
UNII	YG927OP0BK (2:1 salt)
CompTox Dashboard (EPA)	DTXSID4029307
- InChI: InChI=1S/C4H4O4.2H3N/c5-3(6)1-2-4(7)8;;/h1-2H,(H,5,6)(H,7,8);2*1H3/b2-1+;; Key: CKKXWJDFFQPBQL-SEPHDYHBSA-N; InChI=1/C4H4O4.2H3N/c5-3(6)1-2-4(7)8;;/h1-2H,(H,5,6)(H,7,8);2*1H3/b2-1+;; Key: CKKXWJDFFQPBQL-SEPHDYHBBX
- SMILES: O=C(O)\C=C\C(=O)O.N.N

Properties
Chemical formula	C_{4}H_{10}N_{2}O_{4}
Molar mass	150.134 g·mol^{−1}
- Except where otherwise noted, data are given for materials in their standard state (at 25 °C [77 °F], 100 kPa). verify (what is ?) Infobox references

Ammonium fumarate is a compound with formula (NH_{4})_{2}(C_{2}H_{2}(COO)_{2}). It is the ammonium salt of fumaric acid. As a food additive, it has the E number E368.

In theory, ammonium fumarate could be used as a food additive to corn fed to cows, but an experiment with steers found that the additive with palm oil, "did not affect animal performance, carcass characteristics, or economic return."
