= Citranaxanthin =

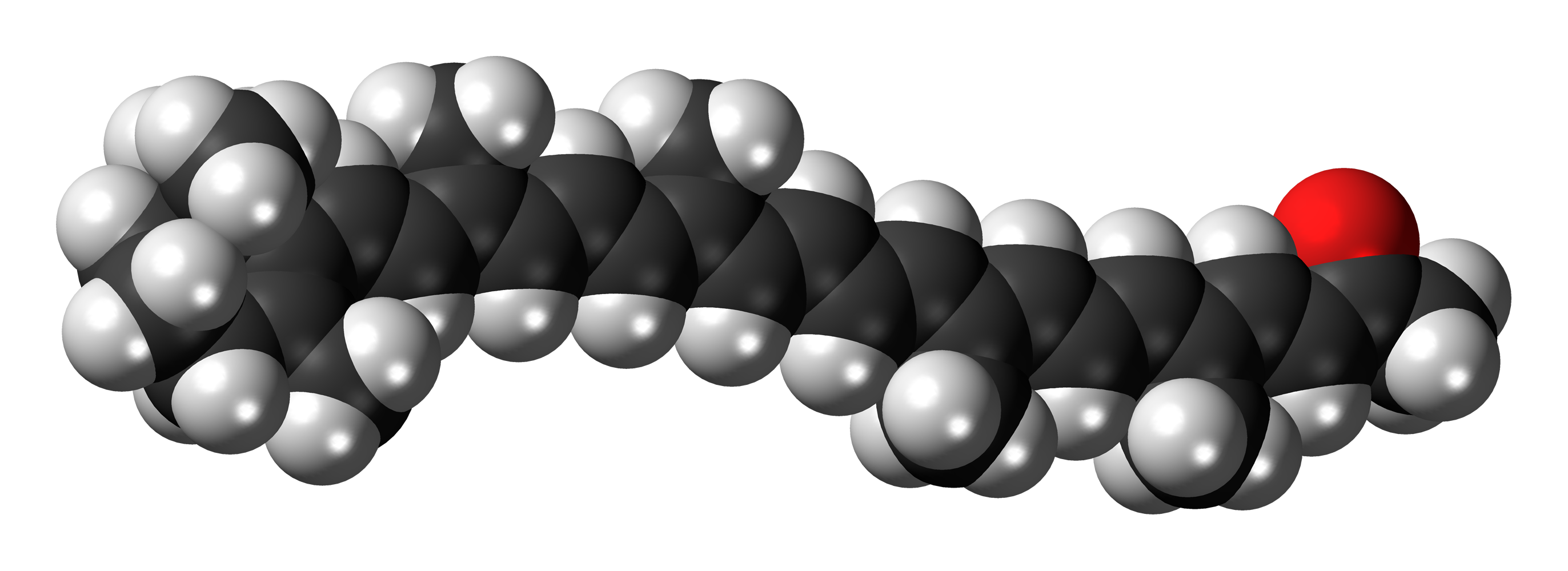

Names
- IUPAC name 5′-Apo-β,χ-caroten-6(5H)-one
- Systematic IUPAC name (3E,5E,7E,9E,11E,13E,15E,17E,19E)-5,9,14,18-Tetramethyl-20-(2,6,6-trimethyl-1-cyclohex-1-en-1-yl)icosa-3,5,7,9,11,13,15,17,19-nonaen-2-one
- Other names: E161i

Identifiers
CAS Number	3604-90-8
3D model (JSmol)	Interactive image
ChEBI	CHEBI:53217
ChemSpider	21171932
ECHA InfoCard	100.020.693
EC Number	222-762-5
E number	E161i (colours)
PubChem CID	6436724
UNII	4QIX1TA44L
CompTox Dashboard (EPA)	DTXSID20883993
- InChI: InChI=1/C33H44O/c1-26(16-11-18-28(3)21-23-31(6)34)14-9-10-15-27(2)17-12-19-29(4)22-24-32-30(5)20-13-25-33(32,7)8/h9-12,14-19,21-24H,13,20,25H2,1-8H3 Key: PRDJTOVRIHGKNU-UHFFFAOYAC
- SMILES: CC1(C)CCCC(C)=C1C=CC(C)=CC=CC(C)=CC=CC=C(C)C=CC=C(C)C=CC(C)=O

Properties
Chemical formula	C_{33}H_{44}O
Molar mass	456.714 g·mol^{−1}
Appearance	Deep violet crystals
Solubility in water	Insoluble
- Except where otherwise noted, data are given for materials in their standard state (at 25 °C [77 °F], 100 kPa). Infobox references

Citranaxanthin is a carotenoid pigment used as a food additive under the E number E161i as a food coloring. There are natural sources of citranaxanthin, but it is generally prepared synthetically. It is used as an animal feed additive to impart a yellow color to chicken fat and egg yolks.
