= Montanic acid =

28-Carbon fatty acid

- Montanic acid

Names
- Preferred IUPAC name Octacosanoic acid

Identifiers
CAS Number	506-48-9
3D model (JSmol)	Interactive image
ChEBI	CHEBI:31001
ChemSpider	10038
ECHA InfoCard	100.007.311
PubChem CID	10470
UNII	4BKL1A0KJY
CompTox Dashboard (EPA)	DTXSID2075051
- InChI: InChI=1S/C28H56O2/c1-2-3-4-5-6-7-8-9-10-11-12-13-14-15-16-17-18-19-20-21-22-23-24-25-26-27-28(29)30/h2-27H2,1H3,(H,29,30) Key: UTOPWMOLSKOLTQ-UHFFFAOYSA-N; InChI=1/C28H56O2/c1-2-3-4-5-6-7-8-9-10-11-12-13-14-15-16-17-18-19-20-21-22-23-24-25-26-27-28(29)30/h2-27H2,1H3,(H,29,30) Key: UTOPWMOLSKOLTQ-UHFFFAOYAA
- SMILES: O=C(O)CCCCCCCCCCCCCCCCCCCCCCCCCCC

Properties
Chemical formula	C_{28}H_{56}O_{2}
Molar mass	424.754 g·mol^{−1}
Density	0.8191 g/mL
Melting point	90.9 °C (195.6 °F; 364.0 K)
Solubility in water	Insoluble
- Except where otherwise noted, data are given for materials in their standard state (at 25 °C [77 °F], 100 kPa). verify (what is ?) Infobox references

Montanic acid is a saturated fatty acid isolated and detected mainly in montan wax. It also occurs in beeswax and Chinese wax. Montanic acid ethylene glycol esters and glycerol esters are used as protective layer on fruit skins and coating on foods. It is known as E number reference E912.
