= Ethulose =

Chemical compound

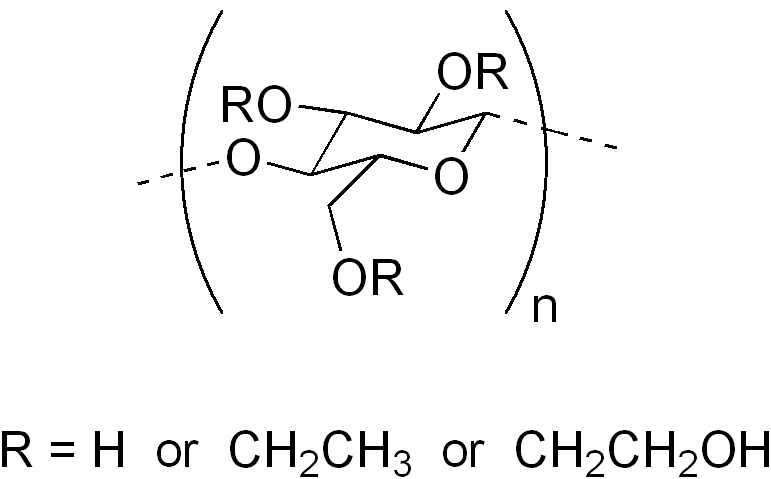

Clinical data
- ATC code: A06AC02 (WHO)

Identifiers
- CAS Number: 9004-58-4
- ChemSpider: none
- UNII: ZDN57Z154K
- E number: E467 (thickeners, ...)
- CompTox Dashboard (EPA): DTXSID80894828
- ECHA InfoCard: 100.126.366

Chemical and physical data
- Formula: variable
- Molar mass: variable

Ethulose is a laxative. It is also known as ethylhydroxyethylcellulose.

As a food additive with INS number 467, ethulose is used as an emulsifier.
