= Fast Yellow AB =

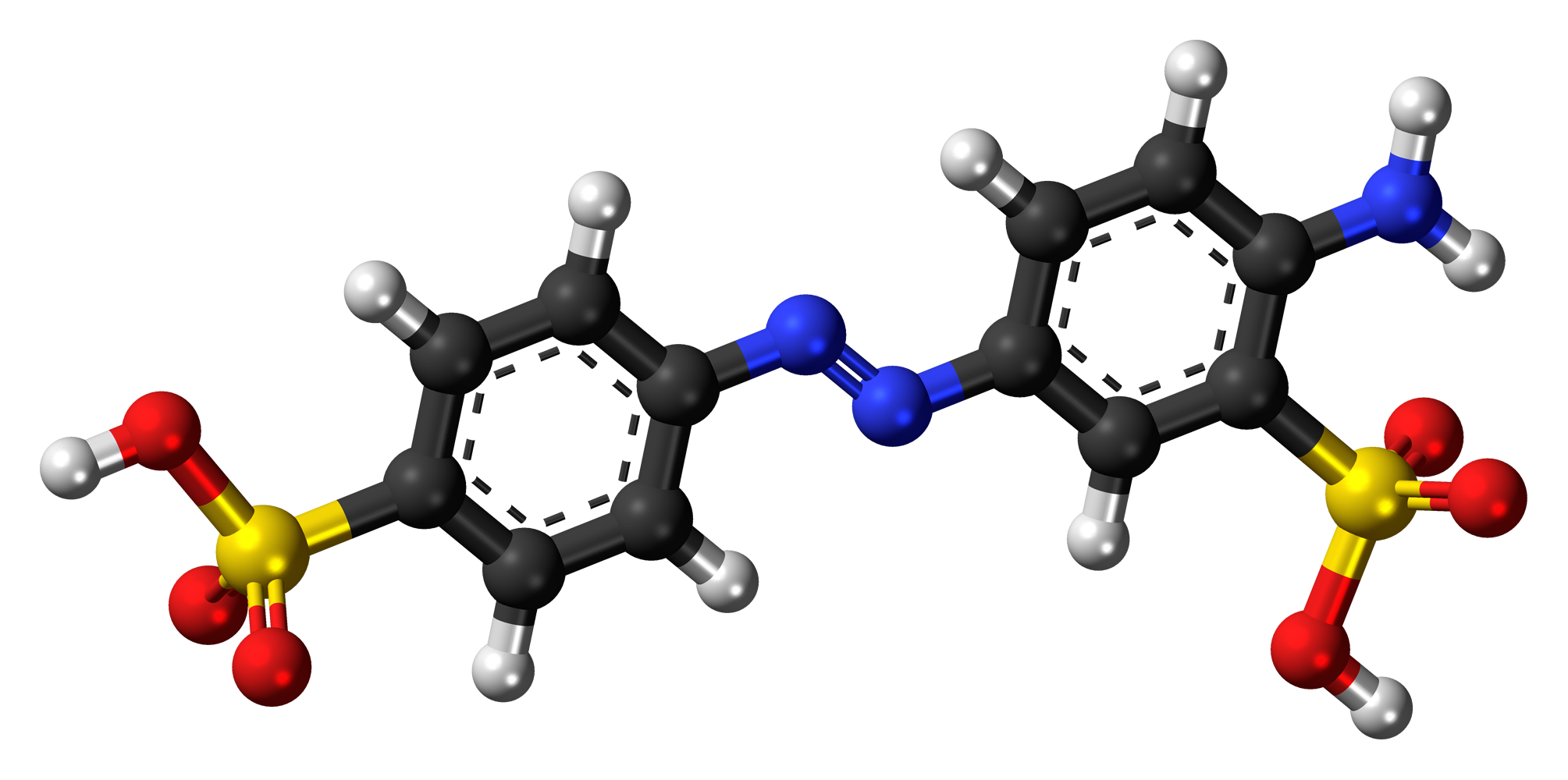

Names
- IUPAC name 2-amino-5-[(E)-(4-sulfophenyl)diazenyl]benzenesulfonic acid
- Other names: Fast Yellow; Acid Yellow; Food Yellow 2; C.I. 13015

Identifiers
CAS Number	101-50-8
3D model (JSmol)	Interactive image
ChEBI	CHEBI:86124
ChEMBL	ChEMBL2172377
ChemSpider	54957
ECHA InfoCard	100.018.448
EC Number	202-947-7
E number	E105 (colours)
PubChem CID	60996; 75918 Na salt
UNII	2ZQE5CCH2H
CompTox Dashboard (EPA)	DTXSID00889458
- InChI: InChI=1S/C12H11N3O6S2/c13-11-6-3-9(7-12(11)23(19,20)21)15-14-8-1-4-10(5-2-8)22(16,17)18/h1-7H,13H2,(H,16,17,18)(H,19,20,21) Key: DCYBHNIOTZBCFS-UHFFFAOYSA-N
- SMILES: Nc1ccc(cc1OS(O)=O)/N=N/c2ccc(OS(O)=O)cc2

Properties
Chemical formula	C_{12}H_{11}N_{3}O_{6}S_{2}
Molar mass	357.36 g·mol^{−1}

Hazards
- GHS labelling
Pictograms	(GHS07: Exclamation mark)
Signal word	Warning
Hazard statements	H315, H319, H335
Precautionary statements	P261, P264, P271, P280, P302+P352, P304+P340, P305+P351+P338, P312, P321, P332+P313, P337+P313, P362, P403+P233, P405, P501
- Except where otherwise noted, data are given for materials in their standard state (at 25 °C [77 °F], 100 kPa). verify (what is ?) Infobox references

Fast Yellow AB is an azo dye. It used to be used as a food dye, designated in Europe by the E number E105. It is now delisted in both Europe and USA and is forbidden if used in foods and drinks, as toxicological data has shown it is harmful. E105 has been implicated in non-atopic asthma.
