= Magnesium trisilicate =

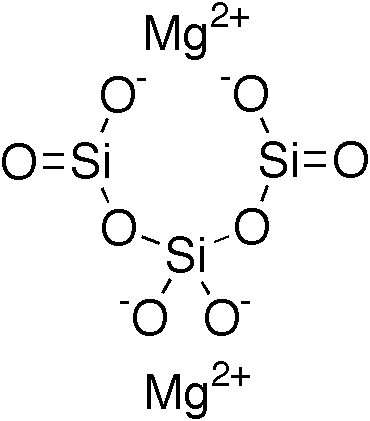
- Structural formula of magnesium trisilicate

Names
- Preferred IUPAC name Dimagnesium dioxido-bis[(oxido-oxosilyl)oxy]silane

Identifiers
CAS Number	14987-04-3; 39365-87-2 (monohydrate)
3D model (JSmol)	Interactive image; Interactive image
ChEMBL	ChEMBL2096633
ChemSpider	4470779
DrugBank	DB09281
ECHA InfoCard	100.035.509
EC Number	239-076-7
PubChem CID	5311266
UNII	FML8G1U0Y3; C2E1CI501T (monohydrate)
CompTox Dashboard (EPA)	DTXSID50904706
- InChI: InChI=1S/2Mg.O8Si3/c;;1-9(2)7-11(5,6)8-10(3)4/q2*+2;-4 Key: GXGAKHNRMVGRPK-UHFFFAOYSA-N
- SMILES: [O-][Si](=O)O[Si]([O-])([O-])O[Si](=O)[O-].[Mg+2].[Mg+2]; [Mg++].[Mg++].[O-][Si](=O)O[Si]([O-])([O-])O[Si]([O-])=O

Properties
Chemical formula	Mg_{2}O_{8}Si_{3}
Molar mass	260.857 g·mol^{−1}
Appearance	White crystals
Odor	Odourless
- Except where otherwise noted, data are given for materials in their standard state (at 25 °C [77 °F], 100 kPa). Infobox references

Magnesium trisilicate is an inorganic compound that is used as a food additive. The additive is frequently used by fast food chains to absorb fatty acids and extract impurities formed while frying edible oils. It has good acid neutralizing properties, but the reaction appears too slow to serve as an effective non-prescription antacid.

== Health effects ==
On March 12, 2007, Chinese health authorities halted the use of magnesium trisilicate at Shaanxi Province KFC franchises, suspecting it to be a possible carcinogen. As a response, China's Ministry of Health conducted tests at six outlets of KFC. The results showed chemicals in the cooking process at KFC restaurants in the country were not harmful. The Ministry of Health said tests showed that using the product to filter cooking oil had no apparent impact on health. Food scares regularly sweep the Chinese media.
