= Sorbitan monooleate =

Names
- IUPAC name 1,4-Anhydro-D-glucitol 6-[(9Z)-octadec-9-enoate]
- Systematic IUPAC name (2R)-2-[(2R,3R,4S)-3,4-Dihydroxyoxolan-2-yl]-2-hydroxyethyl (9Z)-octadec-9-enoate
- Other names: Sorbitan oleate; Span 80

Identifiers
CAS Number	1338-43-8
3D model (JSmol)	Interactive image
ChemSpider	21171844
ECHA InfoCard	100.014.242
EC Number	618-490-5
E number	E494 (thickeners, ...)
PubChem CID	9920342
UNII	06XEA2VD56
CompTox Dashboard (EPA)	DTXSID6027397
- InChI: InChI=1S/C24H44O6/c1-2-3-4-5-6-7-8-9-10-11-12-13-14-15-16-17-22(27)29-19-21(26)24-23(28)20(25)18-30-24/h9-10,20-21,23-26,28H,2-8,11-19H2,1H3/b10-9-/t20-,21+,23+,24+/m0/s1 Key: NWGKJDSIEKMTRX-AAZCQSIUSA-N
- SMILES: CCCCCCCC/C=C\CCCCCCCC(=O)OC[C@H]([C@@H]1[C@@H]([C@H](CO1)O)O)O

Properties
Chemical formula	C_{24}H_{44}O_{6}
Molar mass	428.610 g·mol^{−1}
Density	0.986 g/mL
- Except where otherwise noted, data are given for materials in their standard state (at 25 °C [77 °F], 100 kPa). Infobox references

Sorbitan monooleate (commercially: Span® 80; Croda International PLC) is a nonionic surfactant and emulsifier widely used in various industries, including food, pharmaceuticals, and cosmetics. It is a sorbitan ester produced by the esterification of sorbitan with oleic acid, resulting in a light yellow, viscous liquid that is insoluble in water but soluble in organic solvents.

== Chemistry ==
As a nonionic surfactant, sorbitan monooleate forms a protective layer around dispersed droplets in the emulsion. This layer acts as a barrier, preventing coalescence and phase separation. This helps disperse water droplets within an oil matrix, maintaining the emulsion structure.

- Chemical Formula: C_{24}H_{44}O_{6}
- HLB Value: 4.3; suitable for water-in-oil (W/O) emulsions. Soluble in warm water and has good dispersibility in organic solvents such as ethanol and ethyl acetate.
- Physical Form: Amber liquid
- Fatty acid composition: Oleic acid (C18:1) ≤ 60%; balance primarily linoleic (C18:2), linolenic (C18:3) and palmitic (C16:0) acids.

At high concentrations, sorbitan monooleate can increase the viscosity of the emulsion, which can further enhance stability by reducing the movement of dispersed droplets.

When combined with other surfactants, especially those with higher HLB values like Tween 80, sorbitan monooleate can contribute to the overall stability of oil-in-water (O/W) emulsions. This combination allows for the creation of emulsifying systems with various HLB values, enabling the emulsification of a wide range of oils and waxes.

== Uses ==
=== Emulsification ===
Sorbitan monooleate is used to stabilize emulsions by facilitating the mixture of non-miscible components like oil and water. It is particularly effective in forming stable W/O emulsions. It reduces the interfacial tension between oil and water phases in an emulsion. This lowered tension helps prevent the separation of the two phases, promoting a more stable emulsion.

=== Pharmaceuticals ===
Sorbitan monooleate is used as a wetting agent and dispersant in lipophilic pharmaceutical bases. It is extensively used as a wetting agent and dispersant for materials such as zinc oxide, calamine and penicillin in lipophilic pharmaceutical bases. It is also employed in drug delivery systems to improve the bioavailability of lipophilic compounds.

In research, sorbitan monooleate has been used in a study to assess transfersomes as a transdermal delivery system for sertraline. It has also been used in a study to investigate the dominant factors affecting the stability of nanoemulsions through the use of artificial neural networks.

=== Food Industry ===
Approved for use in various food applications, sorbitan monooleate helps improve texture and stability in products like ice cream and salad dressings.

=== Cosmetics ===
Sorbitan monooleate is utilized in creams and ointments for its emulsifying properties. Recommended topical usage levels are 0.5-5%.

== Environmental Impact ==
Span 80 is biodegradable, making it an environmentally friendly option for industrial applications.
