= Hydroxyethyl methyl cellulose =

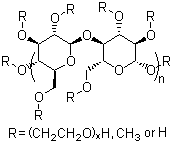

Names
- Other names 2-hydroxyethyl methyl cellulose, Cellulose, 2-hydroxyethyl methyl ether, Methyl hydroxyethyl cellulose

Identifiers
CAS Number	9032-42-2
ChemSpider	none
ECHA InfoCard	100.109.039
UNII	0MGW7Q3QG4
CompTox Dashboard (EPA)	DTXSID001009742

Properties
Chemical formula	variable
Molar mass	variable
- Except where otherwise noted, data are given for materials in their standard state (at 25 °C [77 °F], 100 kPa). verify (what is ?) Infobox references

Hydroxyethyl methyl cellulose is a gelling and thickening agent derived from cellulose. It is used in pharmaceutical formulations.

== See also ==
- Methylcellulose
- Hydroxyethyl cellulose
