= Lolo Hotshots =

Wildland firefighters in Montana, United States

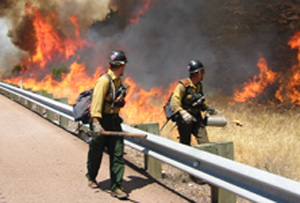
Members of the Lolo Hotshots using drip torches to conduct a back burn.

The Lolo Hotshots are a specialist Interagency Hotshot Crew based out of the Lolo National Forest in west-central Montana. The crew consists of 21 permanent and seasonal wildland firefighters.

== History ==
The Lolo Hotshots were founded in 1961 and are considered to be one of the first hotshot crews in the United States. The Lolo Hotshots received their first dispatch in 1969 to fight the Russian River Fire in Alaska. In 1989, Margaret Doherty was hired as the Lolo Hotshots' Superintendent, becoming the first ever female hotshot superintendent.

== Organization ==
Today, the crew consists of 1 superintendent, 1 assistant superintendent, 3 squad leaders, 6 senior fire firefighters and 10 temporary employees.

== Operations ==
The Lolo Hotshots focus primarily on wildfire suppression and management. The crew's wildfire season typically starts in mid-April and ends in early to mid-October. Crewmembers are expected to be in excellent physical condition and must meet the Standards for Interagency Hotshot Crew Operations. The Lolo Hotshots are deployable anywhere in the United States and have been dispatched to Canada and Brazil to assist in wildfire suppression.

== Incidents ==
On August 13, 2016, firefighter Justin Randal Beebe was killed while falling a hazard tree on the Strawberry Fire in Great Basin National Park, Nevada.

== See also ==
- Smokejumpers
- Helitack
- Aerial firefighting
- Great Fire of 1910
