= Orlando Aloysius Battista =

Canadian-American chemist

- Born: June 20, 1917; Cornwall, Ontario, Canada
- Died: October 3, 1995 (aged 78)
- Occupations: Chemist and author
- Spouse: Helen Francis Keffer
- Children: William, Elizabeth Ann
- Parent: James K. Battista

Orlando Aloysius Battista (June 20, 1917 – October 3, 1995) was a Canadian-American chemist and author. He was known in particular for his inventions and patents.

== Biography ==
Battista was born in Cornwall, Ontario, Canada, as the seventh of eight children. His father was a long-time Canadian government employee. As a child, he was an altar boy and earned money via shoveling snow and a newspaper route. He began writing at the age of twelve, after saving enough money to buy a typewriter. Battista graduated from McGill University with a degree in chemistry.

Battista published scientific papers and books to bring chemistry to laypeople throughout his career.

Research studies related to microcrystalline cellulose and nanocellulose began in the 1950s thanks to Battista's work. Battista whilst at the Textile Research Institute, Princeton (USA), obtained microcrystalline cellulose by controlled hydrolysis of cellulose fibers and subsequent sonification treatment. With this, he opened the door for commercialization of microcrystalline cellulose.

A devout Catholic, he did not shy away from advertising his religious beliefs as well as his scientific ones.

== Quotes ==
"An error doesn't become a mistake until you refuse to correct it." "The best inheritance a parent can give his children is a few minutes of his time each day."

== Works ==
=== Books ===
- How to Enjoy Work and Get More Fun Out of Life (1957)
- God's World and You (1957)
- Fundamentals of High Polymers (1958)
- The Challenge of Chemistry (1959) Illustrated by Gil Cohen.
- The Power to Influence People (1959)
- Mental Drugs; Chemistry's Challenge to Psychotherapy (1960)
- Common Science in Everyday Life (1960)
- Toward the Conquest of Cancer (1961)
- Synthetic Fibers in Papermaking (1964)
- A Dictionary of Quotations (1966)
- Childish Questions (1973) With Helen Keffer Battista. Illustrated by Keiko Couch.
- Research for Profit (1974)
- Microcrystal Polymer Science (1975)
- People Power (1977)
- O. A. Battista's Quotations: A Speaker's Dictionary (1977)
- Olympiad of Knowledge—1984 (1981)
- Amazing Habits of Ants

== Awards ==
- Awarded an honorary Doctor of Science degree by St. Vincent College in 1955.
- Awarded the Anselme Payen Award by the American Chemical Society Cellulose and Renewable Materials Division in 1985.
- The American Chemical Society held a symposium honoring Battista on April 9, 1987, in Denver, Colorado.
