= Hydrophilization =

Hydrophilization is a process used on hydrophobic drugs to increase their release rate from capsules, which depends on the rate of dissolution, by covering the surfaces of their particles with minute droplets of a dissolved hydrophilic polymer (such as methyl cellulose or hydroxyethyl cellulose). In tablet or capsule formulations, this enhances the dissolution and disintegration of the drug.
