= Zeoform =

Manmade material

Zeoform is a material developed by the Australian company, Zeo IP Pty made from water and cellulose. Polymeric lignocellulosic fibres from industrial biomass are used to produce a structural material suitable for various applications in the industrial sector. Depending on the source material it is non-toxic, biodegradable, and that it could replace many forms of hard plastics, synthetic compounds and other polymers.

== History ==
Production is based on a process developed in 1897 by the German company M.M.Rotten in Berlin to produce a natural material utilizing cellulose. Almost 100 years later, three material researchers advanced the process and, in 2005, created a company that manufactured artisanal products from the material.

== Production ==
Zeoform is derived from lignocellulosic biomass, such as hemp, cotton, bamboo, sisal, jute, palm, coconut and other cellulose feedstock. It is made without any glues, binders, chemicals or synthetics. The fundamental chemistry (and patented formula) causes a fibrillation (feathering) of cellulose micro-fibres (in water), then physical ‘entanglement’ and hydroxyl bonding through evaporation. Done correctly, it results in a super-strong, highly durable, consistent material that emulates wood & wood composites, resin composites, fibreglass and many hard plastics. Zeoform can be produced with various qualities – from light styrofoam to dense ebony. The material is sustainable, compostable and sequesters carbon.

== Applications ==
Zeoform can be used as a replacement for conventional materials in hundreds of industries, including construction grade flat sheets and curved panels to replace MDF, Masonite, Formica, Corian and other synthetic composites. Zeoform can be sprayed, molded, pressed, laminated or formed using manual and mechanical processes. It can be produced in quantities ranging from small cottage industry to fully automated and robotic mass production.

== See also ==
- similar materials are marketed as Zelfo and Hempstone
- Biodegradable plastic
