= Forgotten Winchester =

1882 rifle found in Nevada in 2014

Coordinates: 39.005684°N 114.219848°W

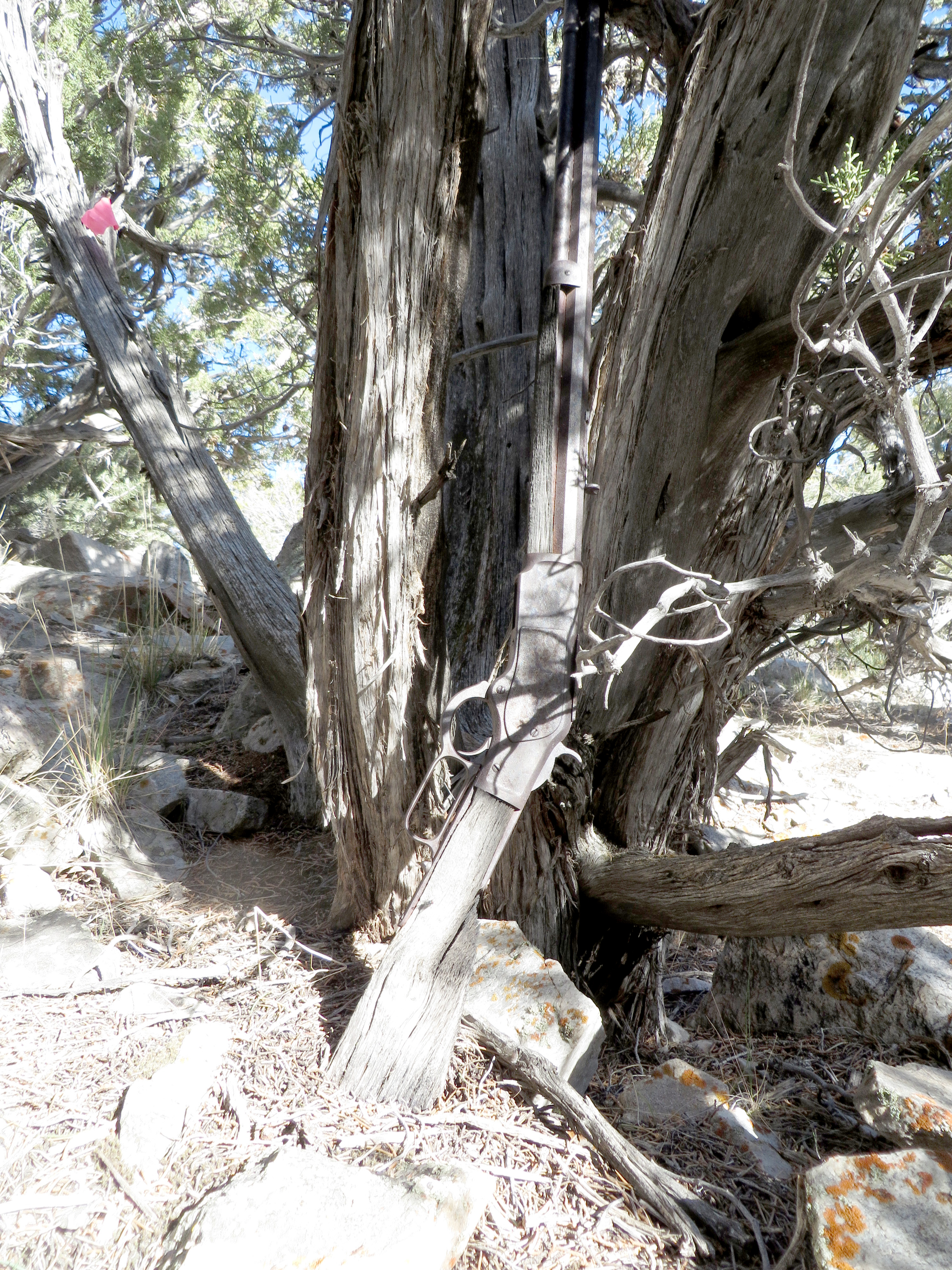
National Park Service photo of the Forgotten Winchester rifle leaning against the tree where it was discovered in 2014

The Forgotten Winchester is a Winchester Model 1873 lever-action centerfire rifle that archaeologists discovered in 2014 leaning against a juniper tree in Great Basin National Park, Nevada.

The gun was manufactured in 1882, but nothing is known of its abandonment. The bottom of its stock was buried in 4–5 inches (10–13 cm) of accumulated soil and vegetation, and a round of ammunition stored in its buttstock dated between 1887 and 1911, indicating that it had been resting there for many years. A post about the rifle on the park's Facebook page went viral, prompting speculation about the rifle's origin. The rifle has become an icon of the American West.

== Discovery ==
Prior to the rifle's discovery, the National Park Service had started a $280,000 fuels reduction project around Strawberry Creek Campground to prevent campfires from sparking wildfires in the surrounding forest. As part of the project, the Park Service sent staff from their cultural resources office to search the project area for artifacts, and archaeologist Eva Jensen found the rifle leaning against a tree above the campground. Less than two years later, the Strawberry Fire swept through the area and consumed the juniper tree the rifle had been leaning against.

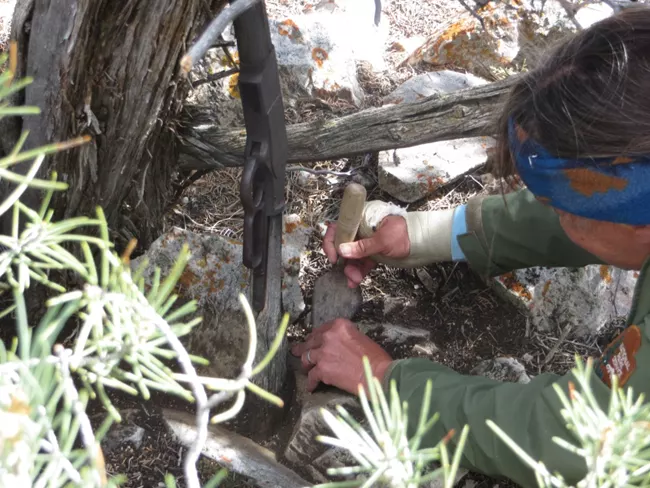
NPS archaeologist Eva Jensen clearing debris to recover the forgotten Winchester rifle

== Conservation and description ==
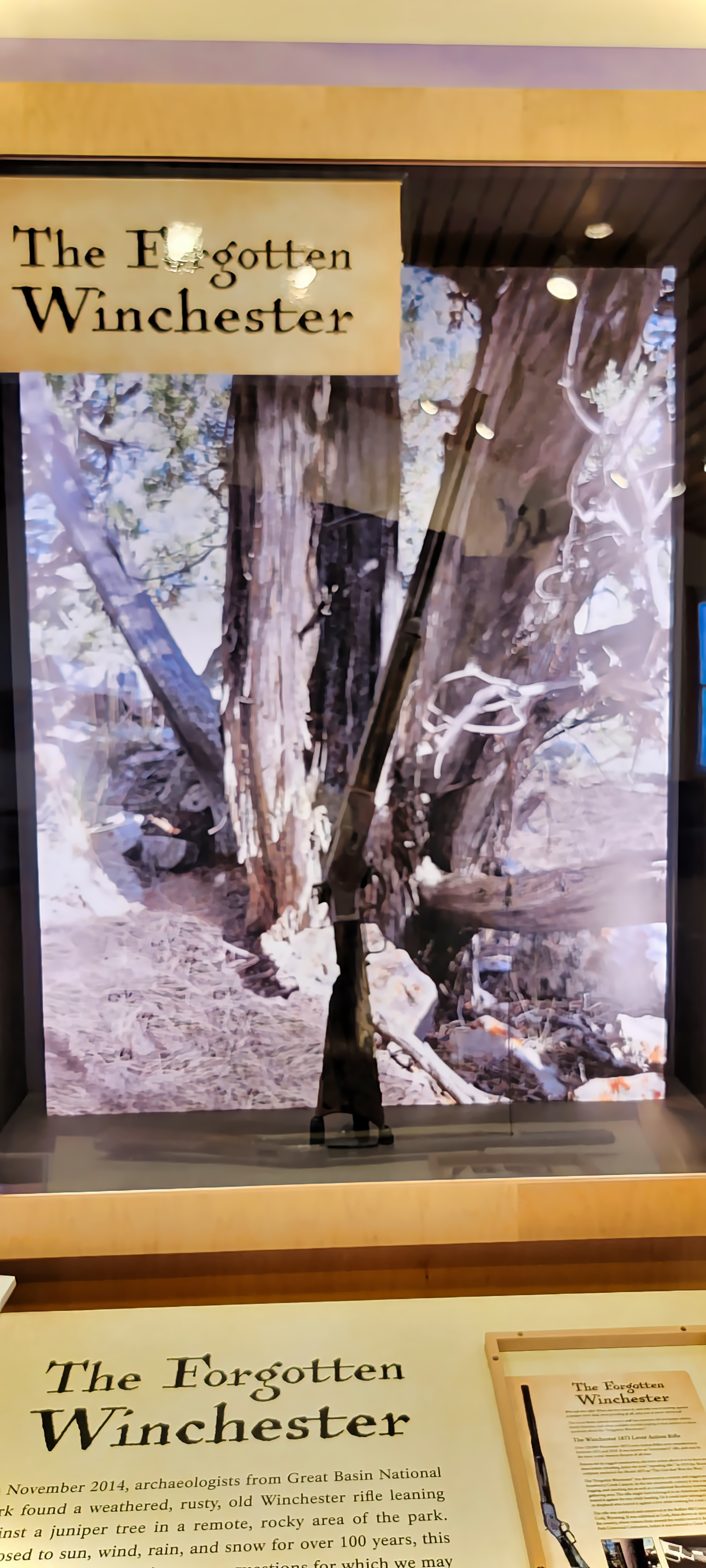
Forgotten Winchester on display at Great Basin NP Visitor Center, 2023

The rifle is a Winchester Repeating Arms Company Model 1873, chambered in .44-40 Winchester. This model is sometimes known as "the gun that won the West." The rifle's serial number indicates that it was one of 25,000 manufactured in 1882.

The park service sent the gun to the Firearms Museum at the Buffalo Bill Center of the West in Cody, Wyoming, for analysis and conservation. A team of researchers took the firearm to a local hospital to be X-rayed under the patient name "Rifle". While the chamber and tube magazine were not loaded, the X-rays revealed a live .44-Winchester centerfire caliber cartridge in a compartment inside the buttstock. This cartridge was manufactured by the Union Metallic Cartridge Company sometime between 1887 and 1911. The rifle's carrier block and lifter system had been deliberately removed and therefore had no means of loading ammunition from the tube magazine, effectively making it a single-shot rifle. The X-ray also showed that a crack in the stock had been repaired with metal pins. The Buffalo Bill Center conservators used hydroxypropyl cellulose to preserve the wooden gunstock and prevent it from further deterioration.

The rifle is on permanent display in the Baker Visitor Center of Great Basin National Park, along with the cartridge found in it.
