= Cellulose =

Polymer of glucose and structural component of cell wall of plants and green algae

- Cellulose, a linear polymer of D-glucose units linked by β(1→4)-glycosidic bonds

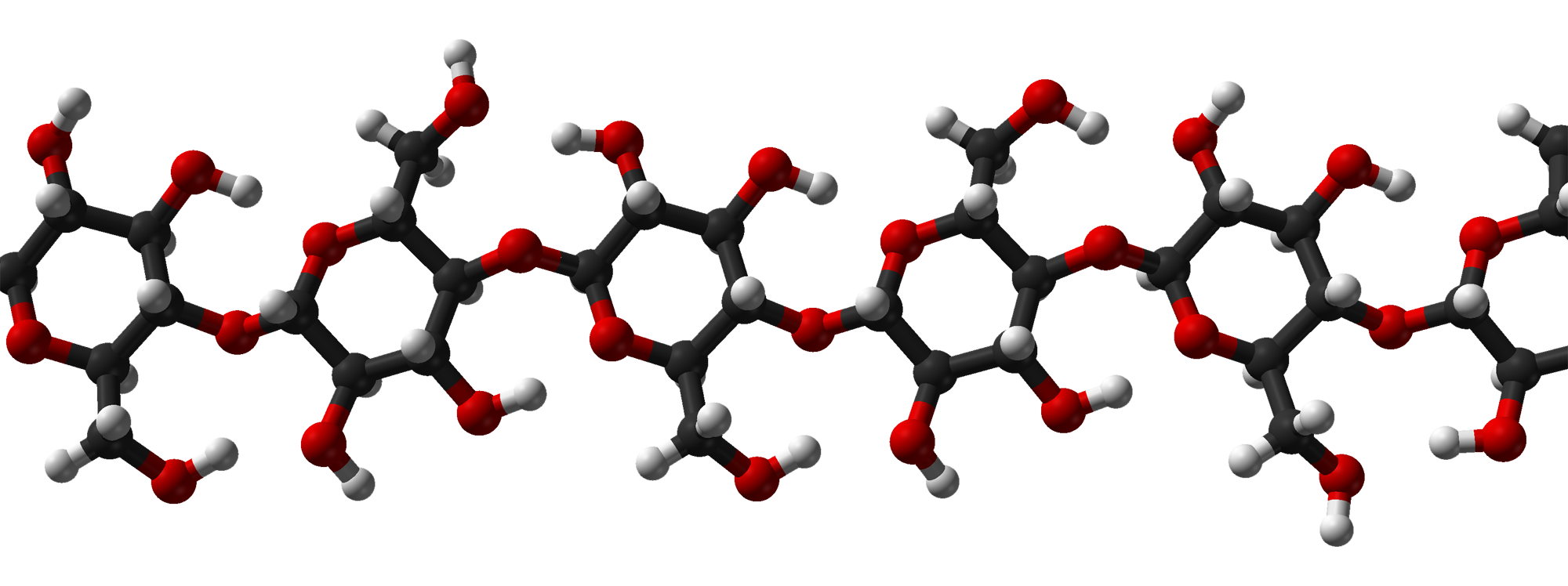
- Three-dimensional structure of cellulose

Identifiers
CAS Number	9004-34-6
ChEMBL	ChEMBL2109009
ChemSpider	None
ECHA InfoCard	100.029.692
EC Number	232-674-9
E number	E460 (thickeners, ...)
KEGG	C00760
PubChem CID	14055602
UNII	SMD1X3XO9M
CompTox Dashboard (EPA)	DTXSID3050492

Properties
Chemical formula	(C_{6}H_{10}O_{5})_{n}
Molar mass	162.1406 g/mol per glucose unit
Appearance	white powder
Density	1.5 g/cm^{3}
Melting point	260–270 °C; 500–518 °F; 533–543 K (decomposes)
Solubility in water	none

Thermochemistry
Std enthalpy of formation (Δ_{f}H^{⦵}_{298})	−963 kJ/mol
Std enthalpy of combustion (Δ_{c}H^{⦵}_{298})	−17.3 MJ/kg

Hazards
NFPA 704 (fire diamond)	1 1 0
- NIOSH (US health exposure limits)
PEL (Permissible)	TWA 15 mg/m^{3} (total); TWA 5 mg/m^{3} (resp)
REL (Recommended)	TWA 10 mg/m^{3} (total); TWA 5 mg/m^{3} (resp)
IDLH (Immediate danger)	N.D.

Related compounds
Related compounds	Starch
- Except where otherwise noted, data are given for materials in their standard state (at 25 °C [77 °F], 100 kPa). verify (what is ?) Infobox references

Cellulose is an organic compound with the formula (C_{6}H_{10}O_{5})_{n}, a polysaccharide consisting of a linear chain of several hundred to many thousands of β(1→4) linked D-glucose units. Cellulose is an important structural component of the cell walls of green plants, many forms of algae, the oomycetes, and test of sea squirts. Some species of bacteria secrete it to form biofilms. Cellulose is the most abundant organic polymer on Earth. The cellulose content of cotton fibre is 90%, that of wood is 40–50%, and that of dried hemp is approximately 57%.

Cellulose is used mainly to produce paperboard and paper. Smaller quantities are converted into a wide variety of derivative products such as cellophane and rayon. Conversion of cellulose from energy crops into biofuels such as cellulosic ethanol is under development as a renewable fuel source. Cellulose for industrial use is mainly obtained from wood pulp and cotton. In addition, cellulose exhibits pronounced susceptibility to direct interactions with certain organic liquids, notably formamide and DMSO, and short-chain amines (methylamine, ethylamine) are among the compounds recognized as highly effective swelling agents.

Some animals, particularly ruminants and termites, can digest cellulose with the help of symbiotic micro-organisms that live in their guts, such as Trichonympha. In human nutrition, cellulose is a non-digestible constituent of insoluble dietary fiber, acting as a hydrophilic bulking agent for feces and potentially aiding in defecation.

== History ==
Cellulose was discovered in 1838 by the French chemist Anselme Payen, who isolated it from plant matter and determined its chemical formula. Cellulose was used to produce the first successful thermoplastic polymer, celluloid, by Hyatt Manufacturing Company in 1870. Production of rayon ("artificial silk") from cellulose began in the 1890s and cellophane was invented in 1912. Hermann Staudinger determined the polymer structure of cellulose in 1920. The compound was first chemically synthesized (without the use of any biologically derived enzymes) in 1992, by Kobayashi and Shoda.

The arrangement of cellulose and other polysaccharides in a plant cell wall

== Structure and properties ==
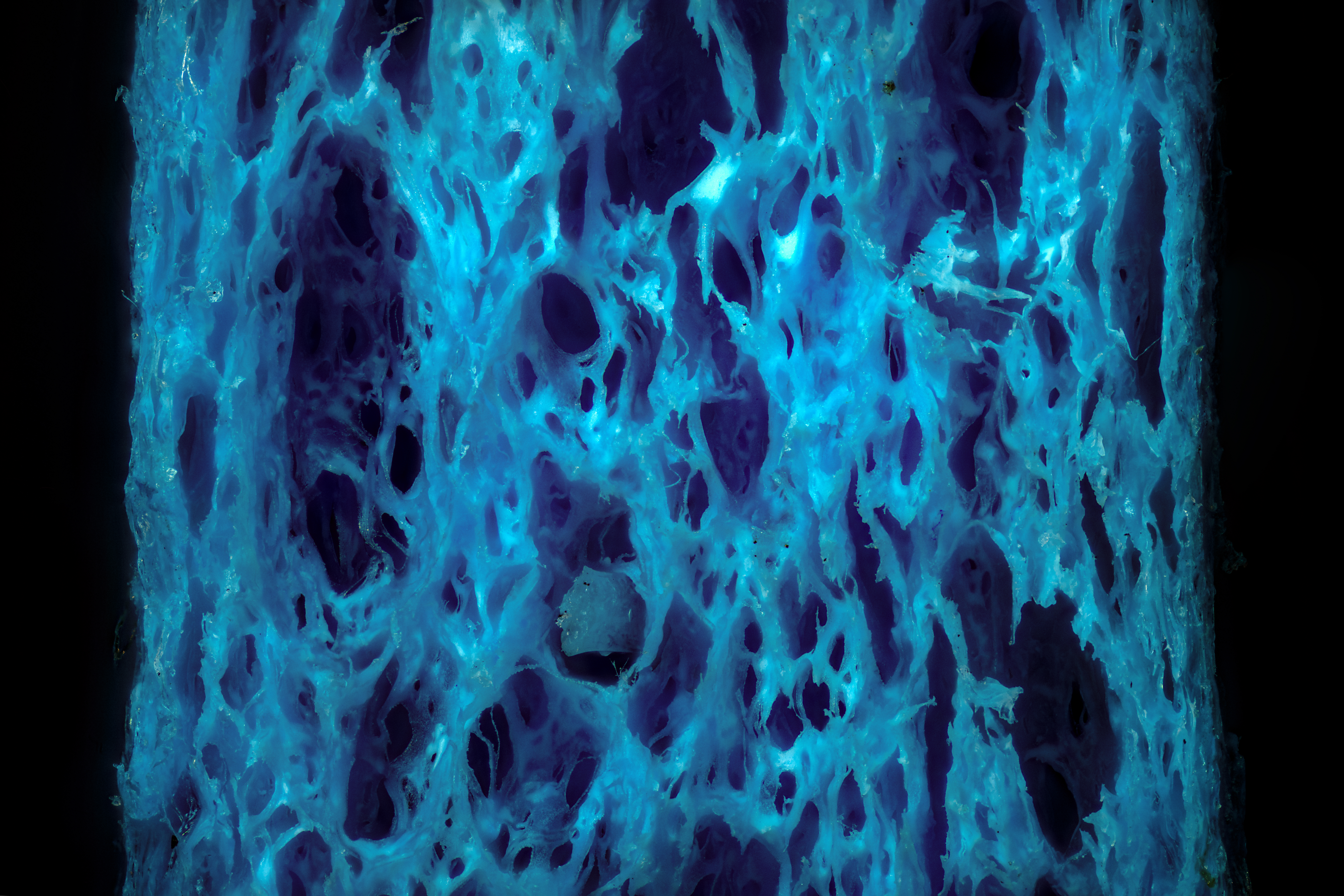
Cellulose under a microscope

Cellulose has no taste, is odorless, is hydrophilic with the contact angle of 20–30 degrees, is insoluble in water and most organic solvents, is chiral and is biodegradable. It was shown to melt at 467 °C (873 °F) in pulse tests in 2016. It can be broken down chemically into its glucose units by treating it with concentrated mineral acids at high temperature.

Cellulose is derived from D-glucose units, which condense through β(1→4)-glycosidic bonds. This linkage motif contrasts with that for α(1→4)-glycosidic bonds present in starch and glycogen. Cellulose is a straight chain polymer. Unlike starch, no coiling or branching occurs and the molecule adopts an extended and rather stiff rod-like conformation, aided by the equatorial conformation of the glucose residues. The multiple hydroxyl groups on the glucose from one chain form hydrogen bonds with oxygen atoms on the same or on a neighbour chain, holding the chains firmly together side-by-side and forming microfibrils with high tensile strength. This confers tensile strength in cell walls where cellulose microfibrils are meshed into a polysaccharide matrix. The high tensile strength of plant stems and of the tree wood also arises from the arrangement of cellulose fibers intimately distributed into the lignin matrix. The mechanical role of cellulose fibers in the wood matrix responsible for its strong structural resistance, can somewhat be compared to that of the reinforcement bars in concrete, lignin playing here the role of the hardened cement paste acting as the "glue" in between the cellulose fibres. Mechanical properties of cellulose in primary plant cell wall are correlated with growth and expansion of plant cells. Live fluorescence microscopy techniques are promising in investigation of the role of cellulose in growing plant cells.

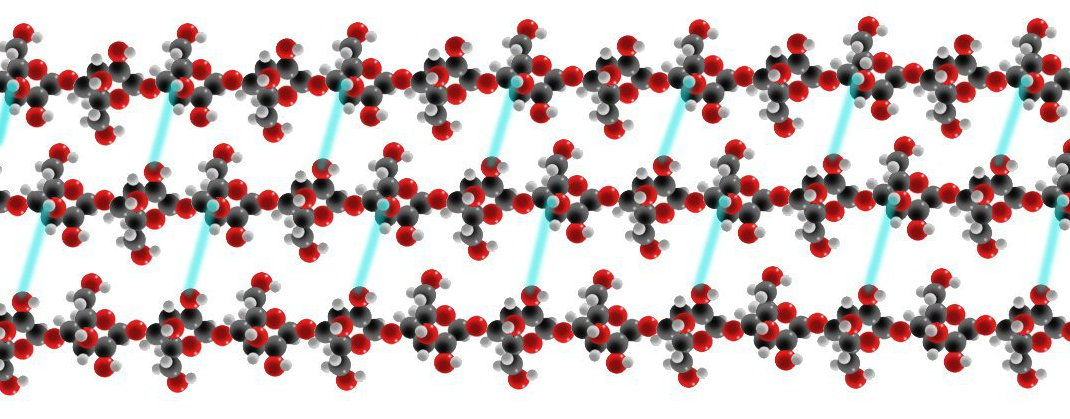
A triple strand of cellulose showing the hydrogen bonds (cyan lines) between glucose strands

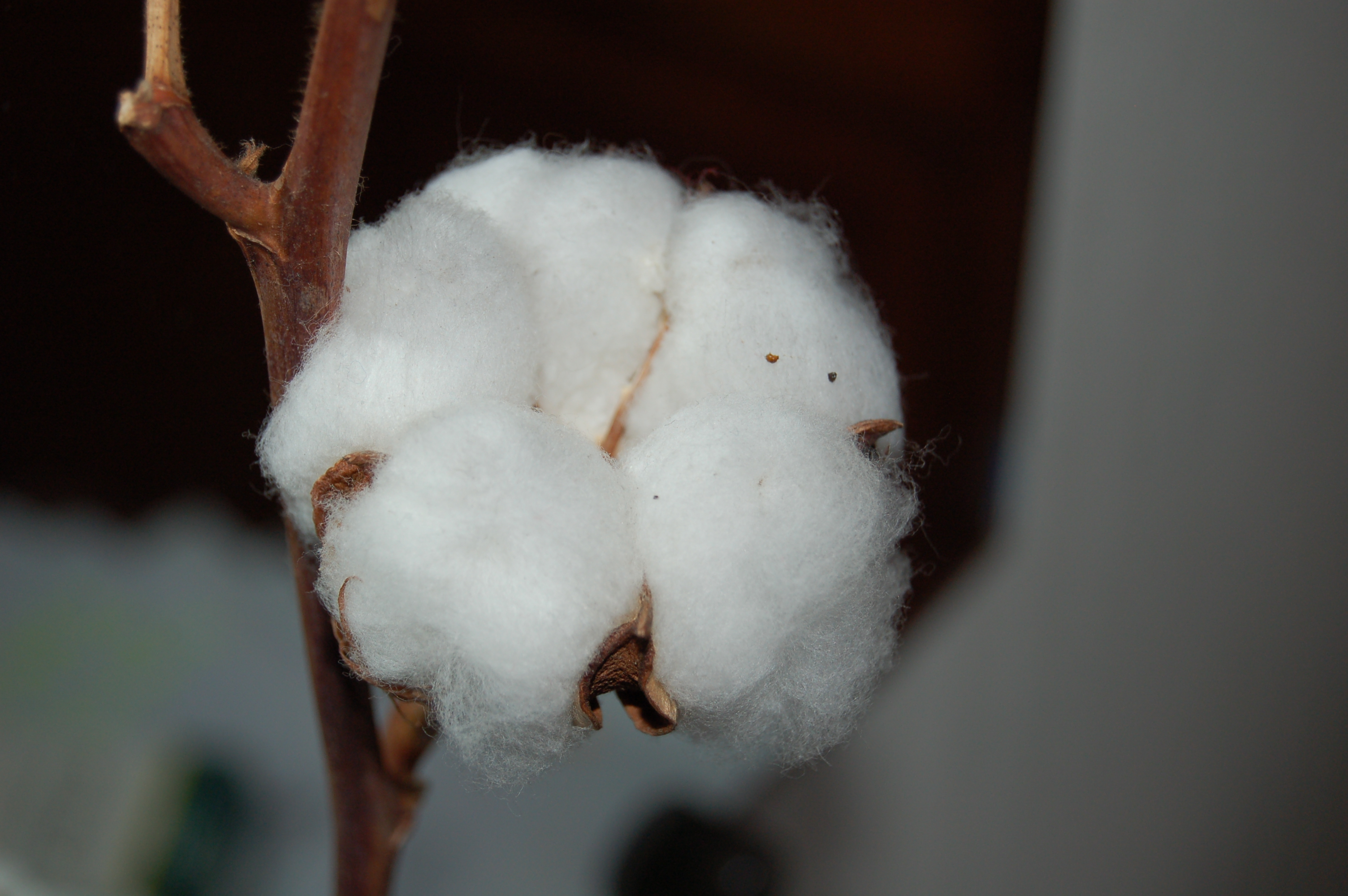
Cotton fibres represent the purest natural form of cellulose, containing more than 90% of this polysaccharide.

Compared to starch, cellulose is also much more crystalline. Whereas starch undergoes a crystalline to amorphous transition when heated beyond 60–70 °C (140–158 °F) in water (as in cooking), cellulose requires a temperature of 320 °C (608 °F) and pressure of 25 MPa (3,600 psi) to become amorphous in water.

Several types of cellulose are known. These forms are distinguished according to the location of hydrogen bonds between and within strands. Natural cellulose is cellulose I, with structures I_{α} and I_{β}. Cellulose produced by bacteria and algae is enriched in I_{α} while cellulose of higher plants consists mainly of I_{β}. Cellulose in regenerated cellulose fibers is cellulose II. The conversion of cellulose I to cellulose II is irreversible, suggesting that cellulose I is metastable and cellulose II is stable. With various chemical treatments it is possible to produce the structures cellulose III and cellulose IV.

Many properties of cellulose depend on its chain length or degree of polymerization, the number of glucose units that make up one polymer molecule. Cellulose from wood pulp has typical chain lengths between 300 and 1700 units; cotton and other plant fibers as well as bacterial cellulose have chain lengths ranging from 800 to 10,000 units. Molecules with very small chain length resulting from the breakdown of cellulose are known as cellodextrins; in contrast to long-chain cellulose, cellodextrins are typically soluble in water and organic solvents.

The chemical formula of cellulose is (C_{6}H_{10}O_{5})_{n} where n is the degree of polymerization and represents the number of glucose groups.

Plant-derived cellulose is usually found in a mixture with hemicellulose, lignin, pectin, and other substances, while bacterial cellulose is quite pure, has a much higher water content and higher tensile strength due to higher chain lengths.

Cellulose consists of fibrils with crystalline and amorphous regions. These cellulose fibrils may be individualized by mechanical treatment of cellulose pulp, often assisted by chemical oxidation or enzymatic treatment, yielding semi-flexible cellulose nanofibrils generally 200 nm to 1 μm in length depending on the treatment intensity. Cellulose pulp may also be treated with strong acid to hydrolyze the amorphous fibril regions, thereby producing short rigid cellulose nanocrystals a few 100 nm in length. These nanocelluloses are of high technological interest due to their self-assembly into cholesteric liquid crystals, production of hydrogels or aerogels, use in nanocomposites with superior thermal and mechanical properties, and use as Pickering stabilizers for emulsions.

== Processing ==
=== Biosynthesis ===
In plants cellulose is synthesized at the plasma membrane by rosette terminal complexes (RTCs). The RTCs are hexameric protein structures, approximately 25 nm in diameter, that contain the cellulose synthase enzymes that synthesize the individual cellulose chains. Each RTC floats in the cell's plasma membrane and "spins" a microfibril into the cell wall.

RTCs contain at least three different cellulose synthases, encoded by CesA (Ces is short for "cellulose synthase") genes, in an unknown stoichiometry. Separate sets of CesA genes are involved in primary and secondary cell wall biosynthesis. There are known to be about seven subfamilies in the plant CesA superfamily, some of which include the more cryptic, tentatively-named Csl (cellulose synthase-like) enzymes. These cellulose syntheses use UDP-glucose to form the β(1→4)-linked cellulose.

Bacterial cellulose is produced using the same family of proteins, although the gene is called BcsA for "bacterial cellulose synthase" or CelA for "cellulose" in many instances. In fact, plants acquired CesA from the endosymbiosis event that produced the chloroplast. All cellulose synthases known belongs to glycosyltransferase family 2 (GT2).

Cellulose synthesis requires chain initiation and elongation, and the two processes are separate. Cellulose synthase (CesA) initiates cellulose polymerization using a steroid primer, sitosterol-beta-glucoside, and UDP-glucose. It then utilises UDP-D-glucose precursors to elongate the growing cellulose chain. A cellulase may function to cleave the primer from the mature chain.

Cellulose is also synthesised by tunicate animals, particularly in the tests of ascidians (where the cellulose was historically termed "tunicine" (tunicin)).

=== Breakdown (cellulolysis) ===
Cellulolysis is the process of breaking down cellulose into smaller polysaccharides called cellodextrins or completely into glucose units; this is a hydrolysis reaction. Because cellulose molecules bind strongly to each other, cellulolysis is relatively difficult compared to the breakdown of other polysaccharides. However, this process can be significantly intensified in a proper solvent, e.g. in an ionic liquid.

Most mammals have limited ability to digest dietary fibre such as cellulose. Some ruminants like cows and sheep contain certain symbiotic anaerobic bacteria (such as Cellulomonas and Ruminococcus spp.) in the flora of the rumen, and these bacteria produce enzymes called cellulases that hydrolyze cellulose. The breakdown products are then used by the bacteria for proliferation. The bacterial mass is later digested by the ruminant in its digestive system (stomach and small intestine). Horses use cellulose in their diet by fermentation in their hindgut. Some termites contain in their hindguts certain flagellate protozoa producing such enzymes, whereas others contain bacteria or may produce cellulase.

The enzymes used to cleave the glycosidic linkage in cellulose are glycoside hydrolases including endo-acting cellulases and exo-acting glucosidases. Such enzymes are usually secreted as part of multienzyme complexes that may include dockerins and carbohydrate-binding modules.

=== Breakdown (thermolysis) ===
At temperatures above 350 °C (662 °F), cellulose undergoes thermolysis (also called 'pyrolysis'), decomposing into solid char, vapors, aerosols, and gases such as carbon dioxide. Maximum yield of vapors which condense to a liquid called bio-oil is obtained at 500 °C (932 °F).

Semi-crystalline cellulose polymers react at pyrolysis temperatures (350–600 °C (662–1,112 °F)) in a few seconds; this transformation has been shown to occur via a solid-to-liquid-to-vapor transition, with the liquid (called intermediate liquid cellulose or molten cellulose) existing for only a fraction of a second. Glycosidic bond cleavage produces short cellulose chains of two-to-seven monomers comprising the melt. Vapor bubbling of intermediate liquid cellulose produces aerosols, which consist of short chain anhydro-oligomers derived from the melt.

Continuing decomposition of molten cellulose produces volatile compounds including levoglucosan, furans, pyrans, light oxygenates, and gases via primary reactions. Within thick cellulose samples, volatile compounds such as levoglucosan undergo 'secondary reactions' to volatile products including pyrans and light oxygenates such as glycolaldehyde.

== Hemicellulose ==
Hemicelluloses are polysaccharides related to cellulose that comprises about 20% of the biomass of land plants. In contrast to cellulose, hemicelluloses (which include xylans, xyloglucans, (gluco)mannans, and mixed-linkage glucans) are derived from several sugars in addition to glucose, especially xylose but also including mannose, galactose, glucuronic acid, fucose, and arabinose. Hemicelluloses consist of shorter chains – between 500 and 3000 sugar units. Furthermore, hemicelluloses are often branched, whereas cellulose is unbranched.

== Regenerated cellulose ==
Cellulose is soluble in several kinds of media, several of which are the basis of commercial technologies. These dissolution processes are reversible and are used in the production of regenerated celluloses (such as viscose and cellophane) from dissolving pulp.

The most important solubilizing agent is carbon disulfide in the presence of alkali. Other agents include Schweizer's reagent, N-methylmorpholine N-oxide, and lithium chloride in dimethylacetamide. In general, these agents modify the cellulose, rendering it soluble. The agents are then removed concomitant with the formation of fibers. Cellulose is also soluble in many kinds of ionic liquids.

The history of regenerated cellulose is often cited as beginning with George Audemars, who first manufactured regenerated nitrocellulose fibers in 1855. Although these fibers were soft and strong -resembling silk- they had the drawback of being highly flammable. Hilaire de Chardonnet perfected production of nitrocellulose fibers, but manufacturing of these fibers by his process was relatively uneconomical. In 1890, L.H. Despeissis invented the cuprammonium process – which uses a cuprammonium solution to solubilize cellulose – a method still used today for production of artificial silk. In 1891, it was discovered that treatment of cellulose with alkali and carbon disulfide generated a soluble cellulose derivative known as viscose. This process, patented by the founders of the Viscose Development Company, is the most widely used method for manufacturing regenerated cellulose products. Courtaulds purchased the patents for this process in 1904, leading to significant growth of viscose fiber production. By 1931, expiration of patents for the viscose process led to its adoption worldwide. Global production of regenerated cellulose fiber peaked in 1973 at 3,856,000 tons.

Regenerated cellulose can be used to manufacture a wide variety of products. While the first application of regenerated cellulose was as a clothing textile, this class of materials is also used in the production of disposable medical devices as well as fabrication of artificial membranes.

== Cellulose esters and ethers ==
The hydroxyl groups (−OH) of cellulose can be partially or fully reacted with various reagents to afford derivatives with useful properties like mainly cellulose esters and cellulose ethers (−OR). In principle, although not always in current industrial practice, cellulosic polymers are renewable resources.

Ester derivatives include:

Cellulose ester	Reagent	Example	Reagent	Group R
Organic esters	Organic acids	Cellulose acetate	Acetic acid and acetic anhydride	H or −(C=O)CH_{3}
Organic esters	Organic acids	Cellulose triacetate	Acetic acid and acetic anhydride	−(C=O)CH_{3}
Organic esters	Organic acids	Cellulose propionate	Propionic acid	H or −(C=O)CH_{2}CH_{3}
Organic esters	Organic acids	Cellulose acetate propionate (CAP)	Acetic acid and propionic acid	H or −(C=O)CH_{3} or −(C=O)CH_{2}CH_{3}
Organic esters	Organic acids	Cellulose acetate butyrate (CAB)	Acetic acid and butyric acid	H or −(C=O)CH_{3} or −(C=O)CH_{2}CH_{2}CH_{3}
Inorganic esters	Inorganic acids	Nitrocellulose (cellulose nitrate)	Nitric acid or another powerful nitrating agent	H or −NO_{2}
Inorganic esters	Inorganic acids	Cellulose sulfate	Sulfuric acid or another powerful sulfating agent	H or −SO_{3}H

Cellulose acetate and cellulose triacetate are film- and fiber-forming materials that find a variety of uses. Nitrocellulose was initially used as an explosive and was an early film forming material. When plasticized with camphor, nitrocellulose gives celluloid.

Cellulose Ether derivatives include:

Cellulose ethers	Reagent	Example	Reagent	Group R = H or	Water solubility	Application	E number
Alkyl	Halogenoalkanes	Methylcellulose	Chloromethane	−CH_{3}	Cold/Hot water-soluble		E461
Alkyl	Halogenoalkanes	Ethylcellulose (EC)	Chloroethane	−CH_{2}CH_{3}	Water-insoluble	A commercial thermoplastic used in coatings, inks, binders, and controlled-release drug tablets, also employed in the production of oleogels and bioplastics	E462
Alkyl	Halogenoalkanes	Ethyl methyl cellulose	Chloromethane and chloroethane	−CH_{3} or −CH_{2}CH_{3}			E465
Hydroxyalkyl	Epoxides	Hydroxyethyl cellulose	Ethylene oxide	−CH_{2}CH_{2}OH	Cold/hot water-soluble	Gelling and thickening agent	
Hydroxyalkyl	Epoxides	Hydroxypropyl cellulose (HPC)	Propylene oxide	−CH_{2}CH(OH)CH_{3}	Cold water-soluble	filming properties, coating properties, pharmaceuticals, cultural heritage restoration, electronic applications, cosmetic sector	E463
Hydroxyalkyl	Epoxides	Hydroxyethyl methyl cellulose	Chloromethane and ethylene oxide	−CH_{3} or −CH_{2}CH_{2}OH	Cold water-soluble	Production of cellulose films	
Hydroxyalkyl	Epoxides	Hydroxypropyl methyl cellulose (HPMC)	Chloromethane and propylene oxide	−CH_{3} or −CH_{2}CH(OH)CH_{3}	Cold water-soluble	Viscosity modifier, gelling, foaming, and binding agent	E464
Hydroxyalkyl	Epoxides	Ethyl hydroxyethyl cellulose	Chloroethane and ethylene oxide	−CH_{2}CH_{3} or −CH_{2}CH_{2}OH			E467
Carboxyalkyl	Halogenated carboxylic acids	Carboxymethyl cellulose (CMC)	Chloroacetic acid	−CH_{2}COOH	Cold/Hot water-soluble	Often used as its sodium salt, sodium carboxymethyl cellulose (NaCMC)	E466

The sodium carboxymethyl cellulose can be cross-linked to give the croscarmellose sodium (E468) for use as a disintegrant in pharmaceutical formulations. Furthermore, by the covalent attachment of thiol groups to cellulose ethers such as sodium carboxymethyl cellulose, ethyl cellulose, or hydroxyethyl cellulose mucoadhesive and permeation enhancing properties can be introduced. Thiolated cellulose derivatives (see thiomers) exhibit also high binding properties for metal ions.

== Commercial applications ==
A strand of cellulose (conformation I_{α}), showing the hydrogen bonds (dashed) within and between cellulose molecules.

Cellulose for industrial use is mainly obtained from wood pulp and from cotton.

- Paper products: Cellulose is the major constituent of paper, paperboard, and card stock. Electrical insulation paper: Cellulose is used in diverse forms as insulation in transformers, cables, and other electrical equipment.
- Fibres: Cellulose is the main ingredient of textiles. Cotton and synthetics (nylons) each have about 40% market by volume. Other plant fibres (jute, sisal, hemp) represent about 20% of the market. Rayon, cellophane, and other "regenerated cellulose fibres" are a small portion (5%).
- Consumables: Microcrystalline cellulose (E460i) and powdered cellulose (E460ii) are used as inactive fillers in drug tablets and a wide range of soluble cellulose derivatives, E numbers E461 to E469, are used as emulsifiers, thickeners, and stabilizers in processed foods. Cellulose powder is, for example, used in processed cheese to prevent caking inside the package. Cellulose occurs naturally in some foods and is an additive in manufactured foods, contributing an indigestible component used for texture and bulk, potentially aiding in defecation.
- Building material: Hydroxyl bonding of cellulose in water produces a sprayable, moldable material as an alternative to the use of plastics and resins. The recyclable material can be made water- and fire-resistant. It provides sufficient strength for use as a building material. Cellulose insulation made from recycled paper is becoming popular as an environmentally preferable material for building insulation. It can be treated with boric acid as a fire retardant.
- Miscellaneous: Cellulose can be converted into cellophane, a thin transparent film. It is the base material for the celluloid that was used for photographic and movie films until the mid-1930s. Cellulose is used to make water-soluble adhesives and binders such as methyl cellulose and carboxymethyl cellulose which are used in wallpaper paste. Cellulose is further used to make hydrophilic and highly absorbent sponges. Cellulose is the raw material in the manufacture of nitrocellulose (cellulose nitrate) which is used in smokeless gunpowder.
- Pharmaceuticals: Cellulose derivatives, such as microcrystalline cellulose (MCC), have the advantages of retaining water, being a stabilizer and thickening agent, and in reinforcement of drug tablets.

=== Aspirational ===
Energy crops:

The major combustible component of non-food energy crops is cellulose, with lignin second. Non-food energy crops produce more usable energy than edible energy crops (which have a large starch component), but still compete with food crops for agricultural land and water resources. Typical non-food energy crops include industrial hemp, switchgrass, Miscanthus, Salix (willow), and Populus (poplar) species. A strain of Clostridium bacteria found in zebra dung can convert nearly any form of cellulose into butanol fuel.

Another possible application is as Insect repellents.

==== Dung-geneering ====
Cellulose has been extracted from cow dung using pressurized spinning from a horizontal vessel capable of structuring small structure nano-fibers.

== See also ==
- Gluconic acid
- Isosaccharinic acid, a degradation product of cellulose
- Lignin
- Zeoform
