= Hydroxypropyl cellulose =

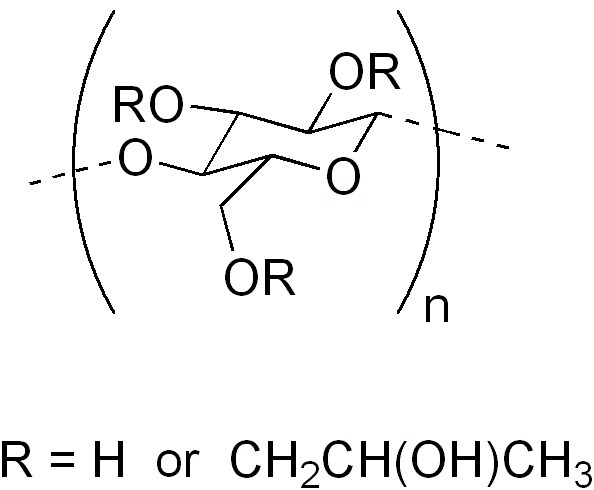

Names
- Other names Cellulose, 2-hydroxypropyl ether; oxypropylated cellulose; E463; hyprolose

Identifiers
CAS Number	9004-64-2
ChEMBL	ChEMBL1201471
ChemSpider	none
DrugBank	DB00840
ECHA InfoCard	100.116.338
E number	E463 (thickeners, ...)
UNII	0A7M0N7SPE
CompTox Dashboard (EPA)	DTXSID90998705 DTXSID6044270, DTXSID90998705

Properties
Chemical formula	variable
Molar mass	variable
- Except where otherwise noted, data are given for materials in their standard state (at 25 °C [77 °F], 100 kPa). verify (what is ?) Infobox references

Hydroxypropyl cellulose (HPC) is a derivative of cellulose with both water solubility and organic solubility. It is used as an excipient; a topical ophthalmic protectant and lubricant; a thickener, emulsifier, and stabilizer in cosmetic formulations; a sieving matrix for DNA separations by capillary and microchip electrophoresis; a leather consolidant used in book preservation; and a wood consolidant.

== Chemistry ==
HPC is an ether of cellulose in which some of the hydroxyl groups in the repeating glucose units have been hydroxypropylated forming -OCH_{2}CH(OH)CH_{3} groups using propylene oxide. The average number of substituted hydroxyl groups per glucose unit is referred to as the degree of substitution (DS). Complete substitution would provide a DS of 3. Because the hydroxypropyl group added contains a hydroxyl group, this can also be etherified during preparation of HPC. When this occurs, the number of moles of hydroxypropyl groups per glucose ring, moles of substitution (MS), can be higher than 3.

Because cellulose is very crystalline, HPC must have an MS about 4 in order to reach a good solubility in water. HPC has a combination of hydrophobic and hydrophilic groups, so it has a lower critical solution temperature (LCST) at 45 °C. At temperatures below the LCST, HPC is readily soluble in water; above the LCST, HPC is not soluble.

At the right concentrations, HPC forms liquid crystals and many mesophases. Such mesophases include isotropic, anisotropic, nematic and cholesteric. The last one gives many colors such as violet, green and red. These colors are structural colors by nature and are also mechanochromic, meaning the HPC mesophase changes color when stress is applied.

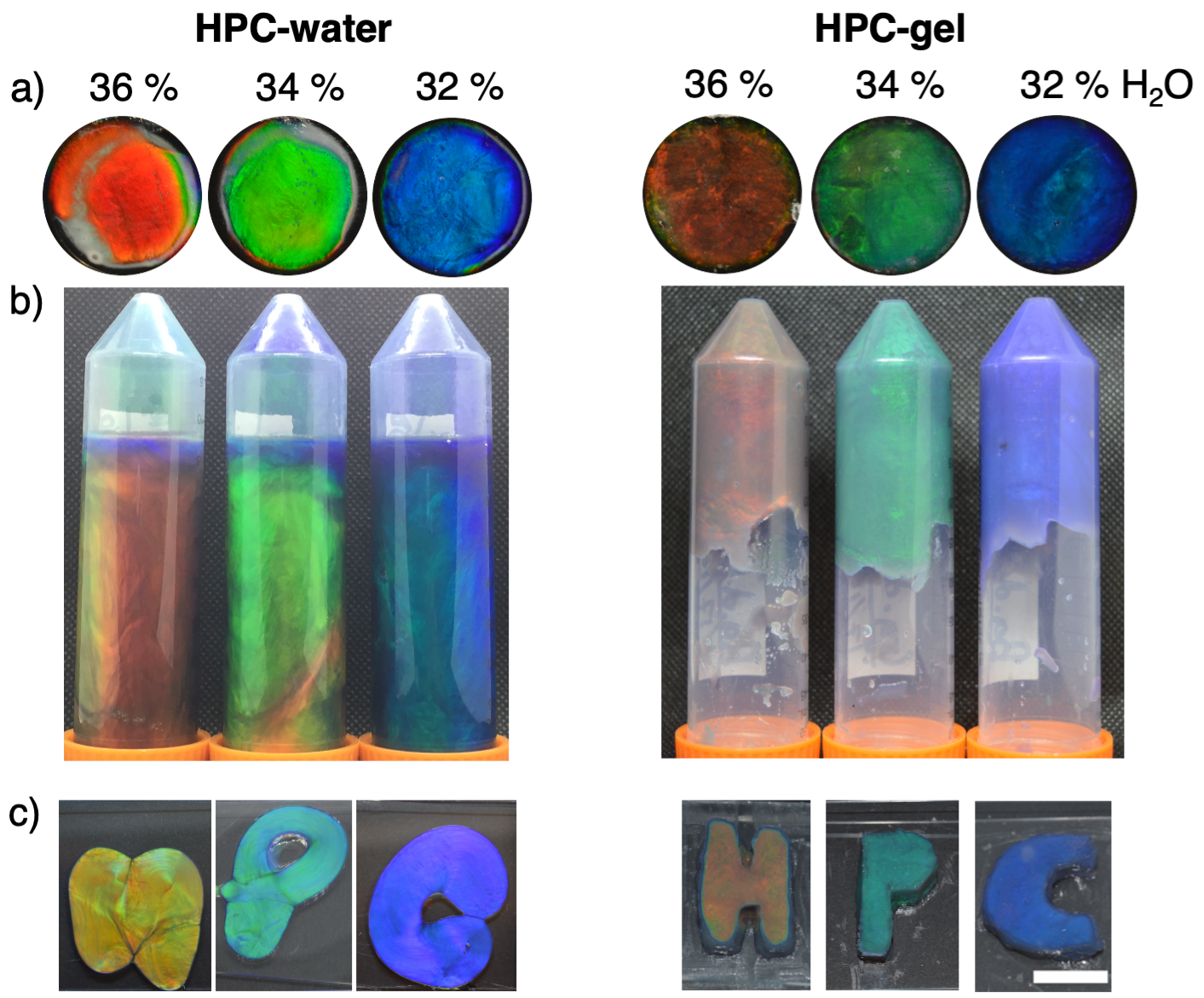
Cholesteric HPC water and HPC gel at different concentrations i.e. colors in various arrangements.

== Uses ==
HPC is well established in the medical, pharmaceutical, and food industries as a widely applicable non-toxic, and cost-effective raw material. It is commonly used as a thickener, emulsifier, stabilizer, binder and anti-caking agent. It has E number E463.

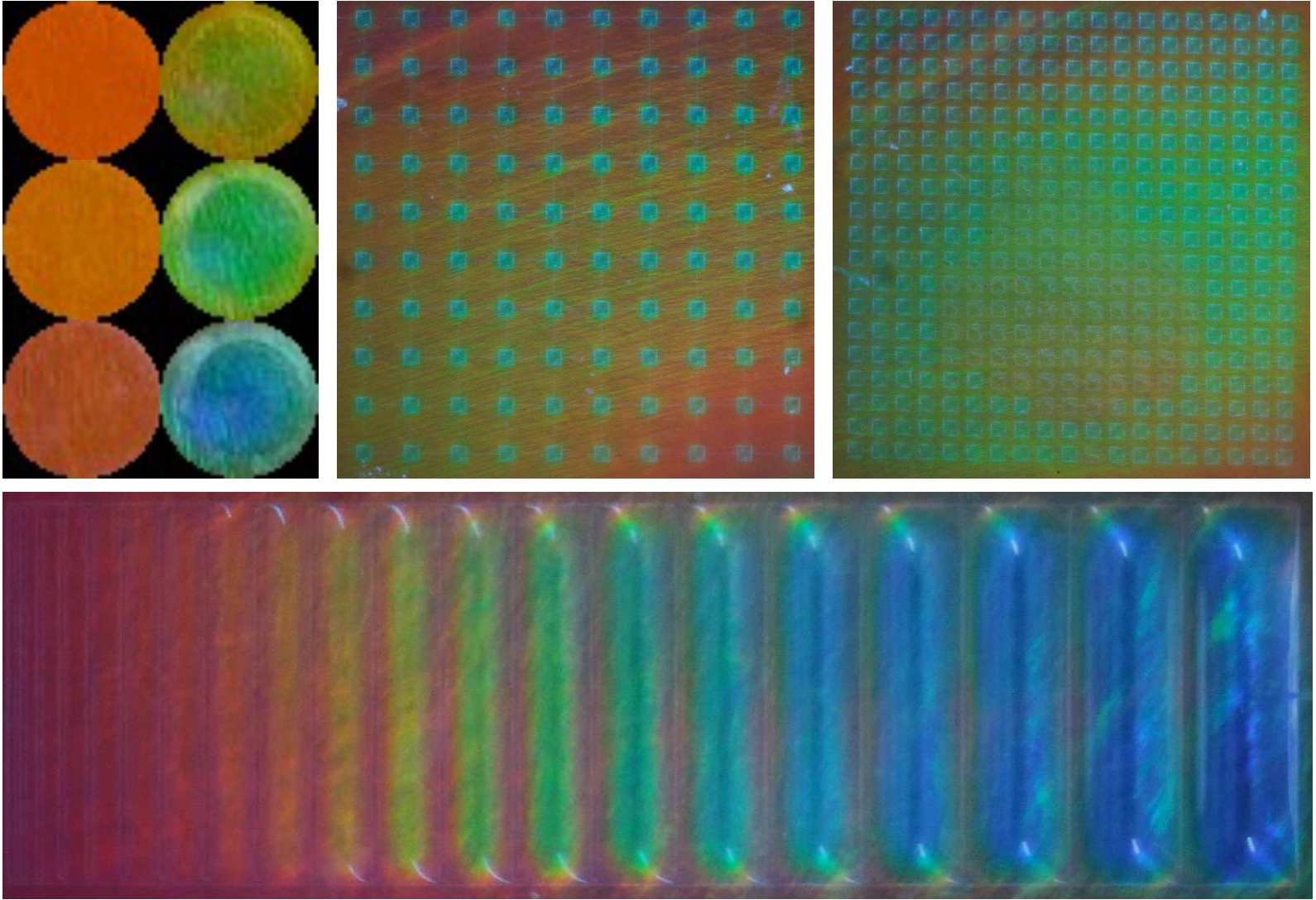
Mechanochromic HPC changing color in response to stress in different design configurations. The top left shows HPC at rest (red) and at progressively higher stresses moving from red through to green to blue (circles 1 mm diameter). The top middle and right shows HPC in two different pixel arrangements (middle = 10 × 10 array with 1 mm pixel spacing; right = 19 × 19 array with 250 μm pixel spacing); both 500 μm^{2} pixels. The bottom shows a mechanochromic rainbow effect.

In pharmaceuticals it is used as a binder in tablets, and is used variously within cosmetic formulations such as shampoos, conditioners, and lotions. Lacrisert, manufactured by Aton Pharma, is a formulation of HPC used for artificial tears. It is used to treat medical conditions characterized by insufficient tear production such as keratoconjunctivitis sicca, recurrent corneal erosions, decreased corneal sensitivity, exposure and neuroparalytic keratitis. HPC is also used as a lubricant for artificial eyes.

HPC is used as a sieving matrix for DNA separations by capillary and microchip electrophoresis.

HPC is the main ingredient in Cellugel, described as a "safe, penetrating consolidant for leather book covers affected by red rot" by Preservation Solutions, and used in book conservation.

Due to its ability for structural color and mechanochromism at the right concentrations, it can also be utilised as an optical strain sensor, or as a more environmentally responsible color display technology driven mechanically.

HPC was used by conservators at the Firearms Museum at the Buffalo Bill Center of the West on the Forgotten Winchester, a Winchester Model 1873 lever-action centerfire rifle discovered in 2014 leaning against a tree in Great Basin National Park, Nevada.

== See also ==
- Carboxymethyl cellulose
- Methyl cellulose
- Hypromellose
