= Hydroxyethyl cellulose =

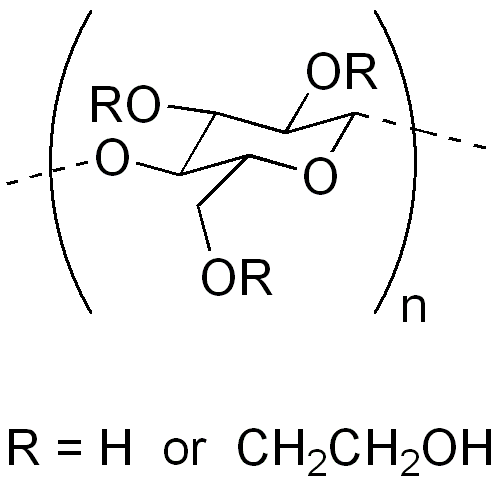

Names
- Other names Cellulose, hydroxyethyl ether; Hydroxyethylcellulose; 2-Hydroxyethyl cellulose; Hyetellose; Natrosol; Cellosize

Identifiers
CAS Number	9004-62-0
ChEBI	CHEBI:85249
ChemSpider	none
ECHA InfoCard	100.116.562
E number	E1525 (additional chemicals)
UNII	12VCE9HR9E
CompTox Dashboard (EPA)	DTXSID1049643

Properties
Chemical formula	variable
Molar mass	variable
Melting point	140 °C (284 °F; 413 K)

Hazards
Safety data sheet (SDS)	MSDS
- Except where otherwise noted, data are given for materials in their standard state (at 25 °C [77 °F], 100 kPa). verify (what is ?) Infobox references

Hydroxyethyl cellulose (or hydroxyethylcellulose) is a gelling and thickening agent derived from cellulose. It is widely used in cosmetics, cleaning solutions, and other household products. Hydroxyethyl cellulose and methyl cellulose are frequently used with hydrophobic drugs in capsule formulations, to improve the drugs' dissolution in the gastrointestinal fluids. This process is known as hydrophilization.

Hydroxyethyl cellulose is also used extensively in the oil and gas industry as a drilling mud additive under the name HEC as well in industrial applications, paint and coatings, ceramics, adhesives, emulsion polymerization, inks, construction, welding rods, pencils and joint fillers.

Hydroxyethyl cellulose can be one of the main ingredients in water-based personal lubricants. It is also a key ingredient in the formation of large bubbles as it possesses the ability to dissolve in water but also provide structural strength to the soap bubble. Among other similar chemicals, it is often used as slime (and gunge, in the UK).

Hydroxyethyl cellulose (HEC) is a commonly used thickener in paint & coating formulations. HEC thickeners are used in paint & coating formulations to increase the viscosity of the paint and to improve its flow and leveling properties.
