= Cellodextrin =

Glucose polymers

Cellodextrins are glucose polymers (polysaccharides) of varying length (two or more glucose monomers) resulting from cellulolysis, the breakdown of cellulose.

== Classification ==
A cellodextrin is classified by its degree of polymerization (DP) which indicates the number of linked glucose monomers it contains. Each glucose monomer is linked via a beta-1,4 glycosidic bond. The most common cellodextrins are listed below:

- cellobiose (DP=2) (sometimes not included in cellodextrin classification)
- cellotriose (DP=3)
- cellotetraose (DP=4)
- cellopentaose (DP=5)
- cellohexaose (DP=6)

== Function ==
Cellodextrins are created through the cleavage of cellulose in most anaerobic bacteria by the cellulosome (an amalgamation of cellulolytic enzymes on the outside of a cell). An endoglucanase first cuts the crystalline cellulose in an amorphous zone and exoglucanases subsequently cleave these large insoluble chunks of cellulose into smaller, soluble cellodextrins which can be used by the cell.

Many cellulolytic bacteria use cellodextrins as their primary source of energy. The energy is obtained through the phosphorolytic cleavage of glycosidic bonds as well as the anaerobic glycolysis of the glucose monomers. Transport of cellodextrins across the cell membrane is usually an active process, requiring ATP.

== See also ==
- Dextrin breakdown of starch
