= Methyl cellulose =

Names
- Other names Cellulose, methyl ether; methylated cellulose; methylcellulose; E461

Identifiers
CAS Number	9004-67-5
ChemSpider	none
ECHA InfoCard	100.115.188
E number	E461 (thickeners, ...)
PubChem CID	Methylcellulose
UNII	4GFU244C4J
CompTox Dashboard (EPA)	DTXSID1036919

Properties
Chemical formula	variable
Molar mass	variable

Pharmacology
ATC code	A06AC06 (WHO)
- Except where otherwise noted, data are given for materials in their standard state (at 25 °C [77 °F], 100 kPa). verify (what is ?) Infobox references

Methyl cellulose (or methylcellulose) is a compound derived from cellulose. It is sold under a variety of trade names and is used as a thickener and emulsifier in various food and cosmetic products, and also as a bulk-forming laxative. Like cellulose, it is non-digestible, non-toxic, and not an allergen. In addition to culinary uses, it is used in arts and crafts such as papier-mâché and is often the main ingredient of wallpaper paste.

== Uses ==
Methyl cellulose has a wide range of uses.

=== Medical ===
==== Constipation ====
Methylcellulose is used to treat constipation and is classified as a bulk forming laxative. It works by increasing the amount of stool present which improves intestinal contractions. Effects generally occur within three days. It is taken orally with sufficient water. Side effects may include abdominal pain.

It is available over the counter. It is sold under the brand name Citrucel among others.

==== Artificial tears and saliva ====
The lubricating property of methylcellulose is of particular benefit in the treatment of dry eyes. Solutions containing methyl cellulose or similar cellulose derivatives are used as substitute for tears or saliva if the natural production of these fluids is disturbed.

==== Medication manufacturing ====
Methyl cellulose is used in the manufacture of drug capsules; its edible and nontoxic properties provide a vegetarian alternative to the use of gelatin.

=== Consumer products ===
==== Thickener and emulsifier ====
Methylcellulose is occasionally added to hair shampoos, tooth pastes and liquid soaps, to generate their characteristic thick consistency. This is also done for foods, for example ice cream or croquette. Methylcellulose also prevents the separation of emulsions because it is an emulsion stabilizer.

==== Food ====
The E number of methylcellulose as food additive is E461. E464 is hydroxypropyl methylcellulose, which is more soluble in water.

Methylcellulose, as a gel, has the unique property of setting when hot and melting when cold.

In some meat analogues that are intended to replicate the texture of meat, methylcellulose is used as an ingredient, typically in concentrations less than 2%.

==== Lubricant ====
Methyl cellulose may be used in personal lubrication.

=== Construction materials ===
Methyl cellulose finds a major application as a performance additive in construction materials. It is added to mortar dry mixes to improve the mortar's properties such as workability, open and adjustment time, water retention, viscosity, adhesion to surfaces etc. Construction grade methyl cellulose is not to be identified with food and pharmaceutical grade methyl cellulose and hydroxypropyl methyl cellulose, as it may be cross-linked with glyoxal for easy dispersion in water.

The construction materials can be cement-based or gypsum-based. Notable examples of dry mixture mortars which utilize methyl cellulose include tile adhesives, EIFS, insulating plasters, hand-trowelled and machine-sprayed plaster, stucco, self-leveling flooring, extruded cement panels, skim coats, joint & crack fillers, and tile grouts. Typical usage is about 0.2% – 0.5% of total dry powder weight for dry mixtures.

Derivatives of methyl cellulose which improve performance characteristics include hydroxypropyl methyl cellulose (HPMC) and hydroxyethyl methyl cellulose (HEMC). These derivatives typically improve the characteristics such as water retention, vertical surface slip resistance, open time, etc.

==== Glue and binder ====
Methyl cellulose can be employed as a mild glue which can be washed away with water. This may be used in the fixing of delicate pieces of art as well as in book conservation to loosen and clean off old glue from spines and bookboards.

Methyl cellulose is the main ingredient in many wallpaper pastes. It is also used as a binder in pastel crayons and also as a binder in medications. Hydroxypropyl methylcellulose (HPMC) is an FDA-approved water-soluble adhesive, has been used in various wet-adhesion applications in construction products, paints, and drug delivery for 70 years. HPMC adheres strongly to all wet surfaces, regardless of hydrophobicity.

==== Paint ====
Methyl cellulose is used as a rheological modifier in paint to prevent 'sagging'.

==== Paper and textile sizing ====
Methyl cellulose is used as sizing in the production of papers and textiles as it protects the fibers from absorbing water or oil. When applied to several pieces of paper, methyl cellulose will bind the layers together, often to create a more durable or multicolored sheet. In addition, origami artists use it to coat their origami models, as the compound will stiffen and protect the paper against time.

=== Dust control ===
Hydroxypropyl methyl cellulose (HPMC) and hydroxyethyl methyl cellulose (HEMC) are used as binders in dust control technologies. They mitigate fugitive dust released in arid and semi-arid areas as well as improve commercial face masks when used in the filtering material.

=== Cell culture ===
Methyl cellulose is also used in cell culture to study viral replication. It is dissolved in the same nutrient-containing medium in which cells are normally grown. A single layer of cells is grown on a flat surface, then infected with a virus for a short time. The strength of the viral sample used will determine how many cells get infected during this time. The thick methyl cellulose medium is then added on top of the cells in place of normal liquid medium. As the viruses replicate in the infected cells, they are able to spread between cells whose membranes touch each other, but are trapped when they enter the methyl cellulose. Only cells closely neighboring an infected cell will become infected and die. This leaves small regions of dead cells called plaques in a larger background of living uninfected cells. The number of plaques formed is determined by the strength of the original sample.

==== Bacterial and protozoal motility inhibitor ====
Aqueous methyl cellulose solutions have been used to slow bacterial and protozoal cell motility for closer inspection. Changing the amount of methyl cellulose in solution permits the adjustment of the solution's viscosity.

==== Stem cell differentiation ====
Methyl cellulose is used in the most common approaches to quantify multiple or single lineage-committed hematopoietic progenitors, called colony-forming cells (CFCs) or colony-forming units (CFUs), in combination with culture supplements that promote their proliferation and differentiation, and allow the clonal progeny of a single progenitor cell to stay together and thus form a colony of more mature cells.

=== Chemistry ===
It is a hydrophilic white powder in pure form and dissolves in cold (but not in hot) water, forming a clear viscous solution or gel.

Methyl cellulose is used as a buffer additive in capillary electrophoresis to control electroosmotic flow for improved separations.

=== Conservation of artworks ===
Pure methyl cellulose is highly resistant to ageing and is therefore ideal for preserving art and cultural artefacts. It can be used to stabilise powdered paint layers and to bond paint layers, frames, wood, textiles, etc. in liquid, foam or mesh form. Not to be confused with hydroxypropyl cellulose (e.g. Klucel), which has lower ageing resistance and is much more plastic.

=== Special effects ===
The slimy, gooey appearance of an appropriate preparation of methyl cellulose with water, in addition to its nontoxic, nonallergenic, and edible properties, makes it popular for use in special effects for motion pictures and television wherever vile slimes must be simulated. In the film Ghostbusters, the gooey substance the supernatural entities used to "slime" the Ghostbusters was mostly a thick water solution of methyl cellulose. The Aliens ooze and drip a great deal of methyl cellulose—especially the queen.

Methyl cellulose has been used to safely simulate molten materials, as well. In several of the Terminator films, it was back-lit with colored gels and films to reproduce the heated glow of iron in the large pouring ladles used to transport the metal from the smelting ovens to the various molds and forms. Methyl cellulose was also a stand-in for the lava flows in Los Angeles in Volcano and on the volcanic surface of Mustafar, in Star Wars: Episode III – Revenge of the Sith.

== Chemistry ==
Methyl cellulose does not occur naturally and is synthetically produced by heating cellulose with caustic solution (e.g. a solution of sodium hydroxide) and treating it with methyl chloride. In the substitution reaction that follows, the hydroxyl residues (-OH functional groups) are replaced by methoxide (-OCH_{3} groups).

Different kinds of methyl cellulose can be prepared depending on the number of hydroxyl groups substituted. Cellulose is a polymer consisting of numerous linked glucose molecules, each of which exposes three hydroxyl groups. The Degree of Substitution (DS) of a given form of methyl cellulose is defined as the average number of substituted hydroxyl groups per glucose. The theoretical maximum is thus a DS of 3.0, however more typical values are 1.3–2.6.

Different methyl cellulose preparations can also differ in the average length of their polymer backbones.

== Solubility and temperature ==
Methyl cellulose has a lower critical solution temperature (LCST) between 40 °C and 50 °C. At temperatures below the LCST, it is readily soluble in water; above the LCST, it is not soluble, which has a paradoxical effect that heating a saturated solution of methyl cellulose will turn it solid, because methyl cellulose will precipitate out. The temperature at which this occurs depends on DS-value, with higher DS-values giving lower solubility and lower precipitation temperatures because the polar hydroxyl groups are masked.

Preparing a solution of methyl cellulose with cold water is difficult however: as the powder comes into contact with water, a gel layer forms around it, dramatically slowing the diffusion of water into the powder; hence, the inside remains dry. A better way is to first mix the powder with hot water, so that the methyl cellulose particles are well dispersed (and so have a much higher effective surface area) in the water, and cool down this dispersion while stirring, leading to the much more rapid dissolution of those particles.

== See also ==
- Carboxymethyl cellulose
- Ethyl cellulose
- Ethyl methyl cellulose
- Hydroxypropyl cellulose
- Hydroxyethyl cellulose
