= Strawberry Fire (2016) =

2016 wildfire in Nevada, United States

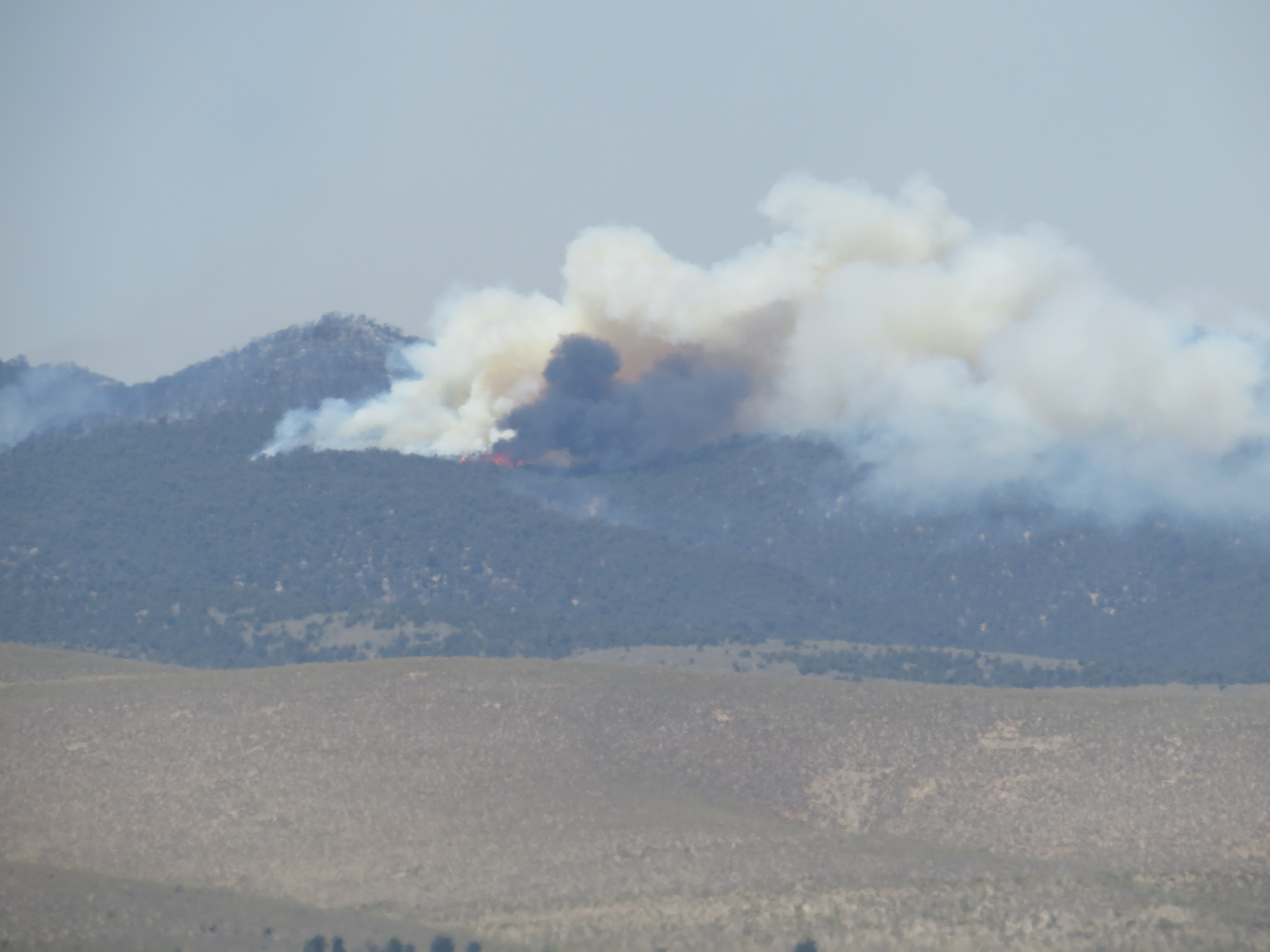
- The Strawberry Fire, seen from the Great Basin Visitor Center in Baker on August 9
- Date: August 5/6, 2016 – August 19, 2016
- Location: Northern Great Basin National Park, White Pine County, Nevada
- Coordinates: 39.05°N 114.29°W

Statistics
- Burned area: 4,714 acres (19 km^{2})

Impacts
- Deaths: 1

Ignition
- Cause: Lightning

Map
- Location of fire in Nevada

The Strawberry Fire was a wildfire that burned in the northern Great Basin National Park in White Pine County, Nevada in August 2016. The wildfire was caused by a lightning strike, and was reported a few days later on August 8. The Strawberry Fire was contained eleven days later. It burned 4,714 acres (1,908 ha) of land, of which sixty percent is part of Great Basin National Park. An additional 38% of the land is located in the Ely District of the Bureau of Land Management. It was the first major wildfire in the national park since 2013. One fireman died while helping to put out the wildfire. The fire also damaged a campground and the habitat of the Bonneville cutthroat trout.

Baker, located approximately 7 miles (11 km) southeast of the Strawberry Fire, was the inhabited place closest to the fire.

== Events ==
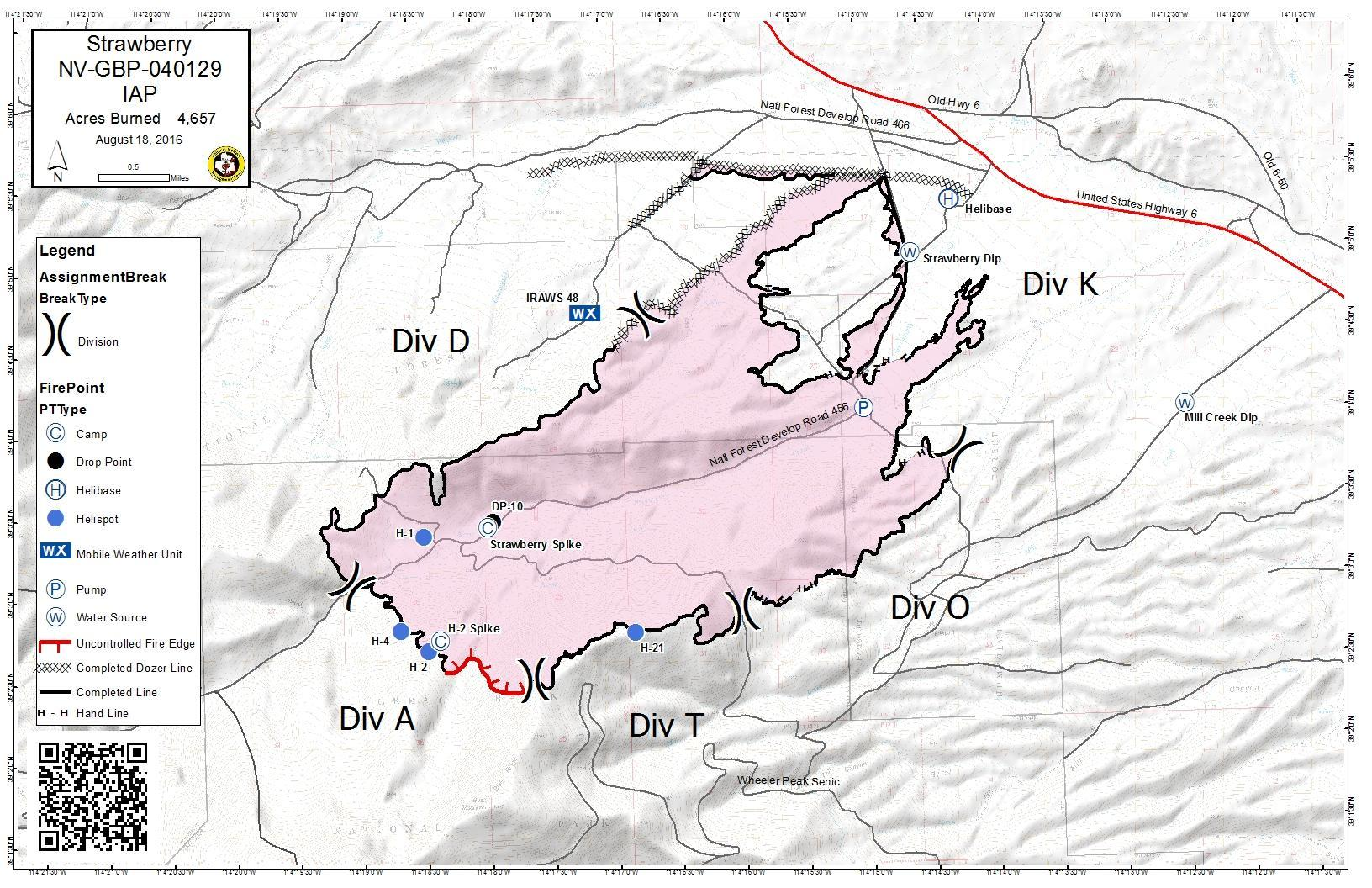
Map of the fire perimeter (click to enlarge the map)

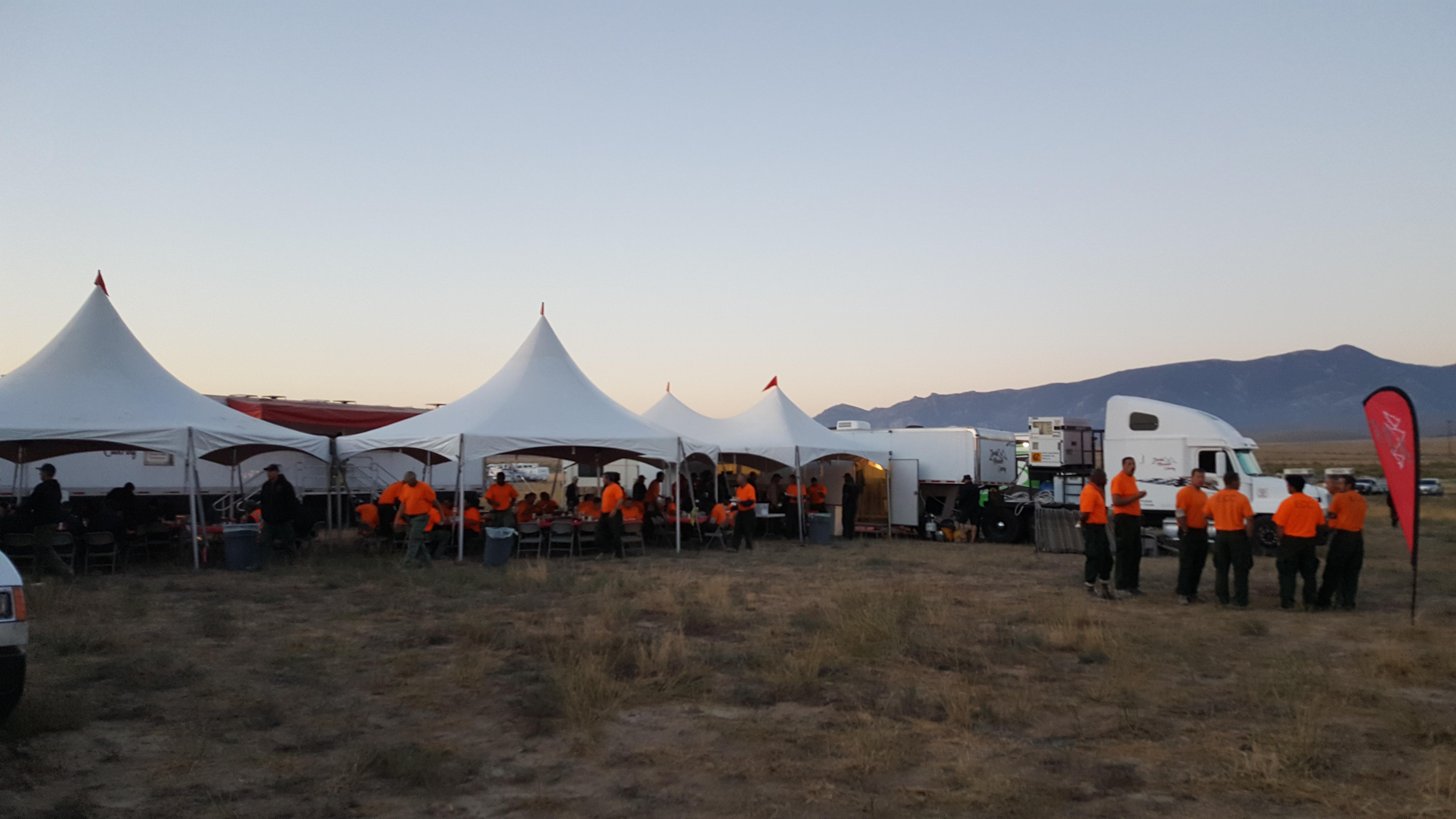
The Incident Command Post, from which the effort to extinguish the fire was commanded.

The Strawberry Fire was caused by a lightning strike, probably on August 5 or 6. The fire remained unreported until August 8, 2016, when two campers noticed it. Subsequently, the fire grew quickly, and started to fill the canyon, as the temperatures were high, and the wind was strong. It was carried mostly by white firs, pinyons, junipers, and sagebrushes. By August 11, the fire had grown to a size of 4,493 acres (1,818 ha), and had been 20% contained. The extinguishing effort was led by "Great Basin Incident Management Team 7", that had 48 members. The mission of the firefighters was to minimize the threat of the fire to humans, to minimize the damage to power lines, and to prevent the wildfire from spreading to the habitat of the sage-grouse and the Bonneville cutthroat trout, a threatened species, in Mill Creek. To save the latter, eight park officials relocated in under four hours a total of more than 200 trouts from the Strawberry Creek to the Silver Creek.

On August 11, a total of 348 people were working to extinguish the fire, who had four helicopters, nine fire engines, and one bulldozer to their disposal. Moreover, the firefighters were assisted by a DC-10 Air Tanker, that dropped fire retardant on the Strawberry Fire, the next day. During the following days, the Strawberry Fire started to grow less fast, and the containment rate increased. While fighting the Strawberry Fire, a firefighter of the Lolo Hotshots, a hotshot crew of the U.S. Forest Service based in Montana, lost his life after a tree fell on him on August 13. The U.S. Forest Service started an investigation into his death as a result. He was honored by dozens of firefighters and police officers on August 17 at a funeral procession between Las Vegas funeral home and North Las Vegas Airport after a private memorial service was held. Afterwards, his body was flown to his hometown, Bellows Falls, Vermont, where another memorial service was held. A third memorial service was held in Missoula, Montana.

By the end of August 14, just over half of the wildfire had been contained. The following days, two more helicopters were deployed, bringing the total to six. In the meantime, the number of personnel on the incident had reached a maximum of 529 on August 15, when the Strawberry Fire was 76% contained. The Strawberry Fire was fully contained around 06:00 PM on August 19. The command over the extinguishing operation had been handed over that day to a type 3 incident management team.

== Effects ==
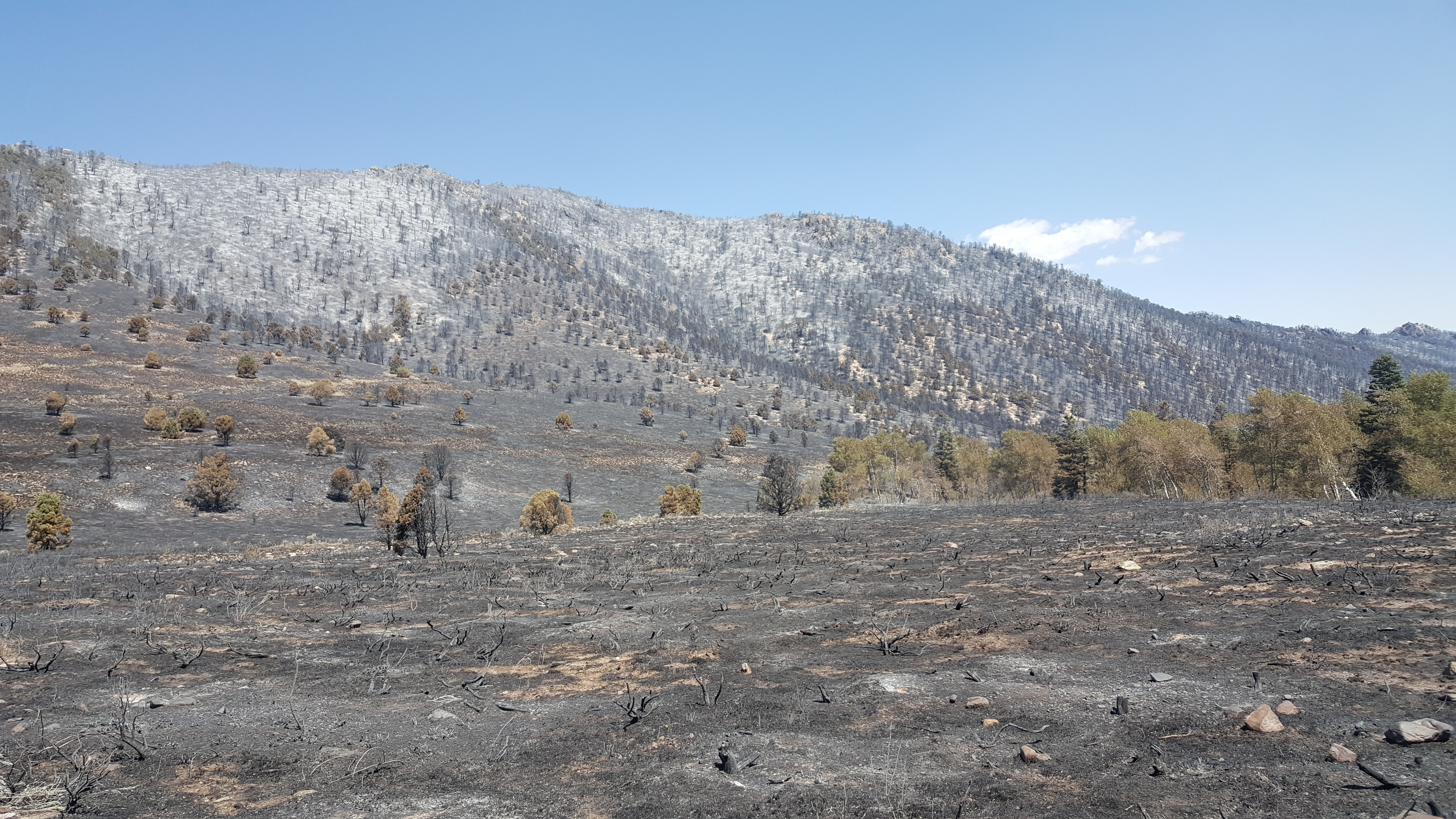
Hills that have been hit by the Strawberry Fire.

Because of the wildfire, the Wheeler Peak Scenic Drive was closed after the Lower Lehman Creek Campground. Additionally, the Strawberry Creek Road, the Wheeler Peak Campground, and several trails were closed. The Wheeler Peak Scenic Drive was reopened on August 19, and the campground was scheduled the reopen on August 22. A Burned Area Emergency Response team started assessing the damage while the wildfire was still burning.

The Strawberry Creek Campground was hit and heavily damaged by the fire. Furthermore, the habitat of the Bonneville cutthroat trout was damaged. Some fish were killed directly by the heat and the debris of the fire, but most damage was done by the destruction of the vegetation on the banks of the creek. The vegetation used to reduce erosion and created shade that kept the water cold. The superintendent of the national park said the water would warm, and sedimentation would occur. The Bonneville cutthroat trout was reintroduced to the national park fourteen years before the Strawberry Fire, in 2002. On August 16 and 17, while the wildfire was still burning, the Snake Creek was renovated in order to restore the habitat of the fish. The renovation was executed by the Great Basin National Park, the Nevada Division of Wildlife, and the Bureau of Land Management as was agreed upon in a 2006 conservation agreement.

The habitat of the elk was damaged as well due to the destruction of trees and other vegetation, but an employee of the park said the newly created meadows would give the elk a large amount of food. Besides, he said the fire would be good for aspens, of which the population was decreasing prior to the wildfire, since a wildfire stimulates the development of roots. However, the wildfire also made the area vulnerable to an influx of nonnative grasses, that could threaten the native vegetation, and could potentially fuel another wildfire.

Less than two years before the Strawberry Fire, a National Park Service archaeologist found a 134-year-old Winchester rifle leaning against a juniper tree near Strawberry Creek Campground. The tree was destroyed by the fire.

== Fire growth and containment progress ==
Fire containment status Gray: contained; Red: active; %: percent contained;
Date	Area burned acres (km^{2})	Containment	Personnel
August 11	4,493 acres (18 km^{2})		348
August 12	4,594 acres (19 km^{2})		365
August 13	4,600 acres (19 km^{2})		434
August 14	4,601 acres (19 km^{2})		434
August 15	4,603 acres (19 km^{2})		529
August 16	4,603 acres (19 km^{2})		443
August 17	4,657 acres (19 km^{2})		360
August 18	4,657 acres (19 km^{2})		255
