= Hypromellose =

Cellulose ether used as emulsifier or thickening agent to disperse colloids in water

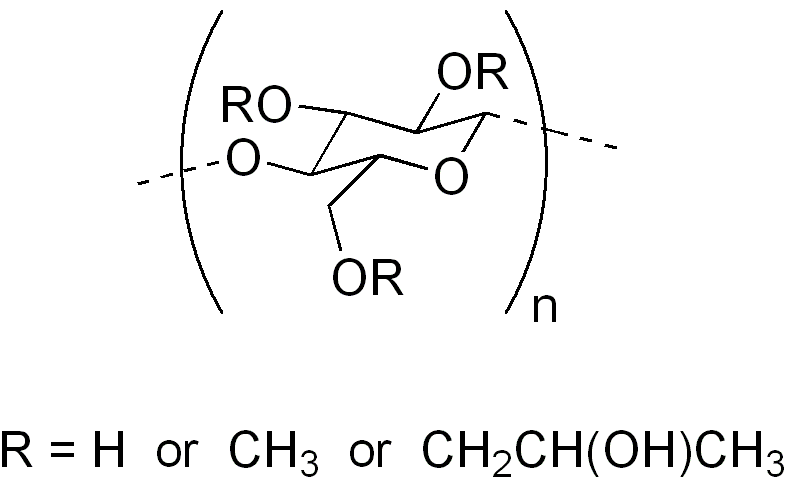

Names
- Other names Hydroxypropyl methylcellulose; Hydroxypropylmethylcellulose; Hydroxypropyl methyl cellulose; HPMC; E464

Identifiers
CAS Number	9004-65-3
ChemSpider	21241863
ECHA InfoCard	100.115.379
EC Number	618-389-6
E number	E464 (thickeners, ...)
UNII	36SFW2JZ0W
CompTox Dashboard (EPA)	DTXSID7037054
- InChI: InChI=1S/C36H70O19.C20H38O11/c1-19(37)9-45-17-27-29(47-11-21(3)39)31(48-12-22(4)40)34(51-15-25(7)43)36(54-27)55-30-28(18-46-10-20(2)38)53-35(52-16-26(8)44)33(50-14-24(6)42)32(30)49-13-23(5)41;1-21-9-11-13(23-3)15(24-4)18(27-7)20(30-11)31-14-12(10-22-2)29-19(28-8)17(26-6)16(14)25-5/h19-44H,9-18H2,1-8H3;11-20H,9-10H2,1-8H3/t19?,20?,21?,22?,23?,24?,25?,26?,27-,28-,29-,30-,31+,32+,33-,34-,35-,36+;11-,12-,13-,14-,15+,16+,17-,18-,19-,20+/m11/s1 Key: PUSNGFYSTWMJSK-GSZQVNRLSA-N; InChI=1/C36H70O19.C20H38O11/c1-19(37)9-45-17-27-29(47-11-21(3)39)31(48-12-22(4)40)34(51-15-25(7)43)36(54-27)55-30-28(18-46-10-20(2)38)53-35(52-16-26(8)44)33(50-14-24(6)42)32(30)49-13-23(5)41;1-21-9-11-13(23-3)15(24-4)18(27-7)20(30-11)31-14-12(10-22-2)29-19(28-8)17(26-6)16(14)25-5/h19-44H,9-18H2,1-8H3;11-20H,9-10H2,1-8H3/t19?,20?,21?,22?,23?,24?,25?,26?,27-,28-,29-,30-,31+,32+,33-,34-,35-,36+;11-,12-,13-,14-,15+,16+,17-,18-,19-,20+/m11/s1 Key: PUSNGFYSTWMJSK-GSZQVNRLBE

Properties
Chemical formula	variable
Molar mass	variable

Pharmacology
ATC code	S01KA02 (WHO)
- Except where otherwise noted, data are given for materials in their standard state (at 25 °C [77 °F], 100 kPa). verify (what is ?) Infobox references

Hypromellose (INN), short for hydroxypropyl methylcellulose or hydroxypropylmethylcellulose (HPMC), is a semisynthetic, inert, viscoelastic polymer used in eye drops, as well as an excipient and controlled-delivery component in oral medicaments, found in a variety of commercial products.

As a food additive, hypromellose is an emulsifier, thickening and suspending agent, and an alternative to animal gelatin. Its Codex Alimentarius code (E number) is E464.

== Chemistry ==
Hypromellose is a solid, and is a slightly off-white to beige powder in appearance and may be formed into granules. The compound forms colloids when dissolved in water. This non-toxic ingredient is combustible and can react vigorously with oxidizing agents.

Hypromellose in an aqueous solution, like methylcellulose, exhibits a thermal gelation property. That is, when the solution heats up to a critical temperature, the solution congeals into a non-flowable but semi-flexible mass. Typically, this critical (congealing) temperature is inversely related to both the solution concentration of HPMC and the concentration of the methoxy group within the HPMC molecule (which in turn depends on both the degree of substitution of the methoxy group and the molar substitution). That is, the higher the concentration of the methoxy group, the lower the critical temperature. The inflexibility/viscosity of the resulting mass, however, is directly related to the concentration of the methoxy group (the higher the concentration is, the more viscous or less flexible the resulting mass is).

== Uses ==
There are many fields of application for hypromellose, including:

- Tile adhesives
- Cement renders
- Gypsum products
- Pharmaceutical
- Paints and coatings
- Food
- Cosmetics
- Detergents and cleaners
- Eye drops
- Contact lenses
- Polyvinyl Chloride (PVC)

=== Use in whole grain breads ===
Agricultural Research Service scientists are investigating using the plant-derived HPMC as a substitute for gluten in making all-oat and other grain breads. Gluten, which is present in wheat, rye, and barley, is absent (or present only in trace quantities) in oat and other grains. Like gluten, HPMC can trap air bubbles formed by the yeast in bread dough, causing the bread to rise.

=== Use in construction materials ===
HPMC is used primarily in construction materials like tile adhesives and renders where it is used as a rheology modifier and water retention agent. Functionally HPMC is very similar to HEMC (hydroxy ethyl methyl cellulose)

=== Ophthalmic applications ===
Hypromellose solutions were patented as a semisynthetic substitute for tear-film. Its molecular structure is predicated upon a base celluloid compound that is highly water-soluble. Post-application, celluloid attributes of good water solubility reportedly aid in visual clarity. When applied, a hypromellose solution acts to swell and absorb water, thereby expanding the thickness of the tear-film. Hypromellose augmentation therefore results in extended lubricant time presence on the cornea, which theoretically results in decreased eye irritation, especially in dry climates, home, or work environments. On a molecular level, this polymer contains beta-linked D-glucose units that remain metabolically intact for days to weeks. On a manufacturing note, since hypromellose is a vegetarian substitute for gelatin, it is slightly more expensive to produce due to semisynthetic manufacturing processes. Aside from its widespread commercial and retail availability over the counter in a variety of products, hypromellose 2% solution has been documented to be used during surgery to aid in corneal protection and during orbital surgery.

=== Excipient/tableting ingredient ===
In addition to its use in ophthalmic liquids, hypromellose has been used as an excipient in oral tablet and capsule formulations, where, depending on the grade, it functions as controlled release agent to delay the release of a medicinal compound into the digestive tract. It is also used as a binder and as a component of tablet coatings.

== Test methods ==
Various benchmark tests are used to qualify hypromellose:

- Viscosity
- Degree of substitution (DS)
- Molar substitution (MS)
- Salt content
- Moisture
- Ash Content

=== Viscosity test methods ===
Because hypromellose solution is a non-newtonian solution and exhibits pseudoplastic, more specifically, thixotropic behavior, various test methods are available, and the results of different methods and viscosimeters do not necessarily correspond to each other. Also, due to viscometer acceptable ranges of error, viscosity is typically given as a mean, or as a range. Typical viscosity test will specify the following:

- Solution concentration (1%, 2%, 1.9% bone dry, etc.)
- Viscometer (RheoSense m-VROC and microVISC, Brookfield LV or RV, Höppler falling ball, Haake Rotovisco, etc.)
- Viscometer spindle number (1 ~ 4 for Brookfield LV, 1 ~ 7 for Brookfield RV, etc.)
- Solution Temperature (20 °C, 25 °C, etc.)

=== Degree of substitution ===
Degree of substitution is the average level of methoxy substitution on the cellulose chain. Since there are maximum three possible sites of substitution with each cellulose molecule, this average value is a real number between 0 and 3. However, degree of substitution is often expressed in percentages.

=== Molar substitution ===
Molar substitution is the average level of hydroxypropoxy substitution on the cellulose chain. Since hydroxypropoxy base can be attached to each other on side chains and does not each require a base substitution site on the cellulose molecule, this number can be higher than 3. However, molar substitution is also often expressed in percentages.

=== Moisture ===
Since all cellulose ethers are hygroscopic, they will absorb moisture from surroundings if left exposed from original packaging. Thus, moisture must be tested and weight corrected to ensure adequate amount of dry active material are apportioned for usage. Moisture is tested by weighing a sample of X grams on an analytic scale, and drying the sample in an oven at 105 °C for 2 hours, then weighing the sample again on the same scale.

=== Ash Content ===
The content of active ingredients in HPMC is directly proportional to its cost-effectiveness, which means better performance at the same dosage. The active ingredient in HPMC is etherified cellulose, an organic substance. Its content can be measured by the ash content from calcined HPMC. Generally, a higher ash value indicates a lower content of active ingredients. Place the crucible with the dried HPMC sample into a furnace set to 550 °C. During this process, the organic components of HPMC burn away, leaving behind only inorganic ash. Then you can calculate the ash content using the following formula:

Content(%) = Weight of Ash(g) / Initial Sample Weight(g) x 100%

== See also ==
- Carboxymethylcellulose
- Hydroxypropyl cellulose
- Methyl cellulose
