= Microcrystalline cellulose =

Refined wood pulp

Microcrystalline cellulose (MCC) is a term for refined wood pulp and is used as a texturizer, an anti-caking agent, a fat substitute, an emulsifier, an extender, and a bulking agent in food production. The most common form is used in vitamin supplements or tablets. It is also used in plaque assays for counting viruses, as an alternative to carboxymethylcellulose.

== Structure ==
A naturally occurring polymer, it is composed of glucose units connected by a 1-4 beta glycosidic bond. These linear cellulose chains are bundled together as microfibril spiralled together in plant cell walls.

Each microfibril exhibits a high degree of three-dimensional internal bonding resulting in a crystalline structure that is insoluble in water and resistant to reagents. There are, however, relatively weak segments of the microfibril with weaker internal bonding. These are called amorphous regions; some argue that they are more accurately called dislocations, because of the single-phase structure of microfibrils. The crystalline region is isolated to produce microcrystalline cellulose.

== Uses ==
Approved within the European Union as a thickener, stabilizer or emulsifier, microcrystalline cellulose was granted the E number E460(i) with basic cellulose given the number E460.

MCC has use in cosmetics as an abrasive, absorbent, anti-caking agent, aqueous viscosity increasing agent, binder, bulking agent, emulsion stabilizer, slip modifier, and texturizer, which can be found in various hair and skin care products as well as makeup.

The MCC is a valuable additive in pharmaceutical, food, cosmetic and other industries. Different properties of MCC are measured to qualify its suitability to such utilization, namely particle size, density, compressibility index, angle of repose, powder porosity, hydration swelling capacity, moisture sorption capacity, moisture content, crystallinity index, crystallite size, and mechanical properties such as hardness and tensile strength.

== Synthesis ==
MCC is pure partially depolymerized cellulose synthesized from α-cellulose precursor. The MCC can be synthesized by different processes such as reactive extrusion, enzyme mediated, mechanical grinding, ultrasonication, steam explosion and acid hydrolysis. The latter process can be done using mineral acids such as H_{2}SO_{4}, HCl and HBr as well as ionic liquids. The role of these reagents is to destroy the amorphous regions leaving the crystalline domains.

The degree of polymerization is typically less than 400. The MCC particles with size lower than 5 μm must not be more than 10%.

Thermogravimetric analysis (TGA) and differential thermal analysis (DTA) or differential scanning calorimetry (DSC) are also important to predict the thermal behavior of the MCC upon heat stresses.

== Allergic reactions ==
At least one case of an allergic reaction to microcrystalline cellulose has been documented.

It has been noted as a potential MCAS excipient trigger depending on the source and processing method of the cellulose.
