= Carboxymethyl cellulose =

Cellulose derivative grafted with carboxymethyl groups

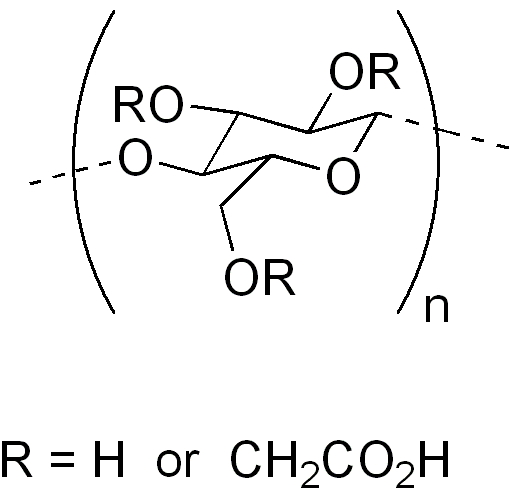

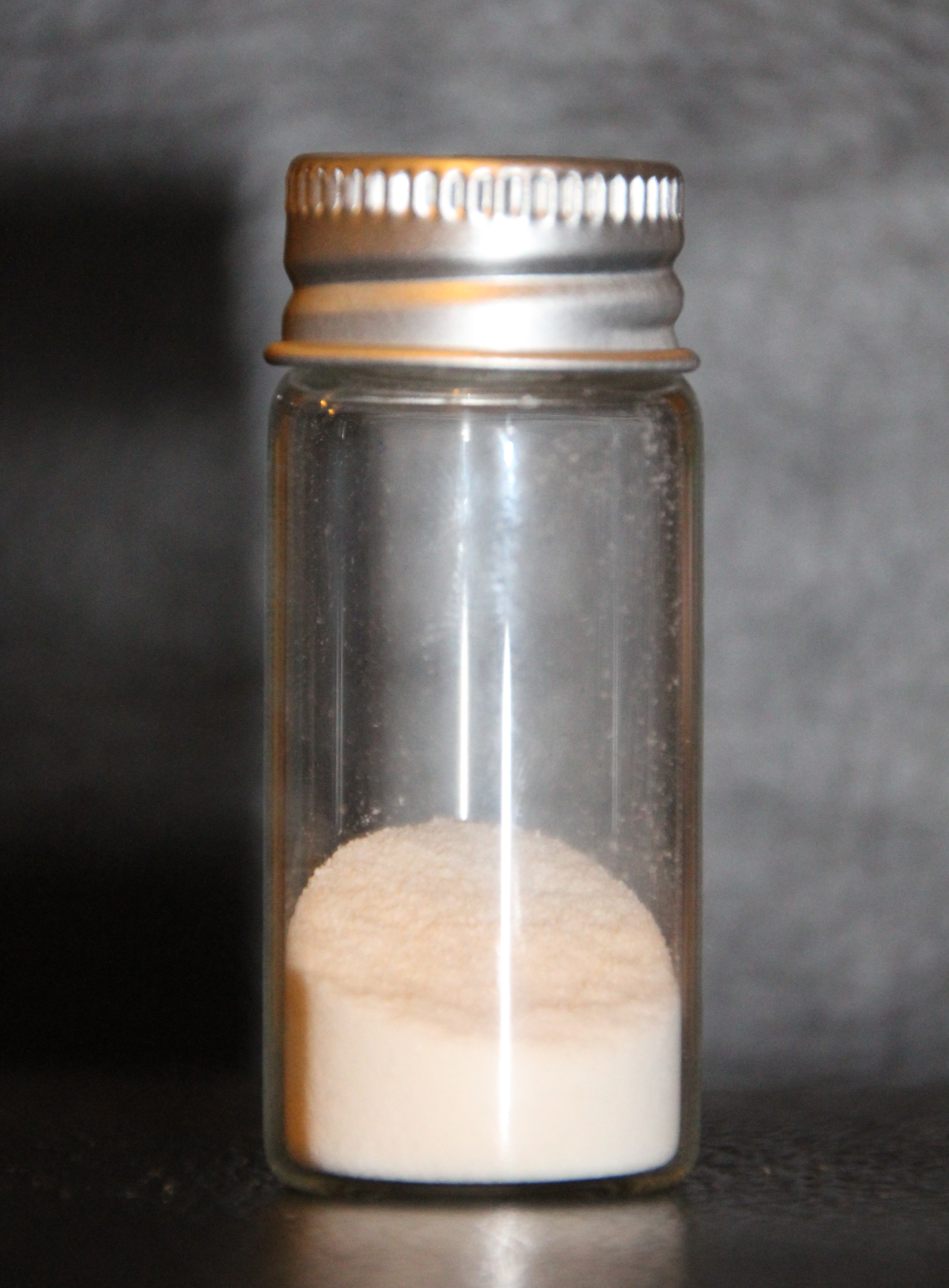

Names
- Other names Carboxymethylcellulose; carmellose; E466

Identifiers
CAS Number	9004-32-4
ChEBI	CHEBI:85146
ChEMBL	ChEMBL1909054
ChemSpider	none
ECHA InfoCard	100.120.377
E number	E466 (thickeners, ...)
UNII	05JZI7B19X
CompTox Dashboard (EPA)	DTXSID7040441

Properties
Chemical formula	variable
Molar mass	variable
- Except where otherwise noted, data are given for materials in their standard state (at 25 °C [77 °F], 100 kPa). verify (what is ?) Infobox references

Carboxymethyl cellulose (CMC) or cellulose gum is a cellulose derivative with carboxymethyl groups (-CH_{2}-COOH) bound to some of the hydroxyl groups of the glucopyranose monomers that make up the cellulose backbone. It is often used in its sodium salt form, sodium carboxymethyl cellulose. The addition of carboxylic acid groups to the cellulose backbone allows carboxymethyl cellulose to be dissolved in water unlike natural cellulose. This allows its use in numerous food and pharmaceutical applications that require water-soluble polymers.

== Preparation ==
Carboxymethyl cellulose is synthesized by treating cellulose with chloroacetic acid or its sodium salt. The cellulose must first be activated by treatment with sodium hydroxide, which helps disrupt the hydrogen bonding within and between the strands of cellulose polymer. The reaction with chloroacetic acid or chloroacetate entails an alkylation process, giving ether groups C^{−}O^{−}CH_{2}CO_{2}H or C^{−}O^{−}CH_{2}CO^{−}_{2}. The process, also called etherification, is an example of the Williamson ether synthesis.

The polar (organic acid) carboxyl groups render the cellulose soluble and chemically reactive. Fabrics made of cellulose – e.g., cotton or viscose (rayon) – may also be converted into CMC.

Following the initial reaction, the resultant mixture produces approximately 60% CMC and 40% salts (sodium chloride and sodium glycolate). This product, called technical CMC, is used in detergents as a thickening agent.

An additional purification process is used to remove salts to produce pure CMC, which is used for food and pharmaceutical applications. An intermediate 'semi-purified' grade is also produced, which is typically used in paper applications such as the restoration of archival documents.

== Structure and properties ==
=== Structure ===
Alkylation (ethericifation) occurs at the 2, 3, and 6 hydroxyl position. 2-Alkylation is slightly faster.

CMC is a derivative of the regenerated cellulose [C_{6}H_{10}O_{5}]_{n} with hydroxy-acetic acid (hydroxyethanoic acid) CH_{2}(OH)COOH or sodium monochloroacetate (Na[ClCH_{2}COO]). The CMC backbone consists of D-glucose residues linked by -1,4-linkage. It has carboxymethyl groups (-CH_{2}-COOH) bound to some of the hydroxyl groups of the glucopyranose monomers that make up the cellulose backbone. It is often used as its sodium salt, sodium carboxymethyl cellulose.

=== Properties ===
CMC is a white or lightly yellow powder with no odor, flavor, or poisonous properties. It is hygroscopic and dissolves well in hot or cold water, forming a viscous solution. It is not soluble in organic solvents like methanol, ethanol, acetone, chloroform, and benzene. The functional properties of CMC depend on the degree of substitution of the cellulose structure (i.e., how many of the hydroxyl groups have been converted to carboxymethylene groups in the substitution reaction), as well as the chain length of the cellulose backbone structure and the degree of clustering of the carboxymethyl substituents. It is commonly used as a viscosity modifier or thickener and to stabilize emulsions in various products, both food and non-food-related. It is mainly used because it has a high viscosity, is nontoxic, and is generally considered to be hypoallergenic.

== Uses ==
Applications of carboxymethyl cellulose (CMC) range from food production to medical treatments. It is commonly used as a viscosity modifier or thickener and to stabilize emulsions in both food and non-food products. It is used primarily because it has high viscosity, is nontoxic, and is generally considered to be hypoallergenic, as the major source fiber is either softwood pulp or cotton linter. It is also used in non-food products which include products such as toothpaste, laxatives, diet pills, water-based paints, detergents, textile sizing, reusable heat packs, various paper products, filtration materials, synthetic membranes, wound healing applications, and also in leather crafting to help burnish edges.

=== Food ===
CMC is registered as E466 or E469 (when it is enzymatically hydrolyzed). It is used as a viscosity modifier or thickener and to stabilize emulsions in various products, including ice cream, mayonnaise, and beverages. It is also used extensively in gluten-free and reduced-fat food products. CMC injections have also been used in food fraud, to fraudulently increase the weight and visual appeal of shrimp and prawns so as to short-weight customers.

CMC's variable viscosity (high while cold, and low while hot) makes it useful in the preparation of cold foods and textures in beverages and edible gels. With a degree of substitution (DS) around 1.0, it can prevent dehydration and shrinkage of gelatin while also contributing to a more airy structure. In some foods, it can be used to control oil and moisture content.

CMC is used to achieve tartrate or cold stability in wine, which can prevent excess energy usage while chilling wine in warm climates. It is more stable than metatartaric acid and inhibits tartrate crystal nucleation and growth.

CMC powder is widely used in the ice cream industry to make ice creams without the need for churning or extremely low temperatures. CMC is used in baking breads and cakes. The use of CMC gives the loaf an improved quality (e.g., texture) at a reduced cost by reducing the need for fat. CMC is also used as an emulsifier in sweet biscuits. Dispersing fat uniformly in the dough improves the release of the dough from the molds and cutters, achieving well-shaped biscuits without any distorted edges. It can also help to reduce the amount of egg yolk or fat used in making the biscuits. The use of CMC in candy preparation ensures smooth dispersion in flavor oils and improves texture and quality. CMC is used in chewing gums, margarine, and peanut butter as an emulsifier.

=== Detergent uses ===
CMC is a common ingredient in cleaning products because of its thickening and stabilizing properties and nontoxic composition. In detergent and cleaning products, it can be used to enhance texture and assist in the suspension of dirt and grime in the cleaning product. Its adjustable viscosity can be used to standardize the textures of the products, especially when used along with other chemicals.

CMC helps with the removal of grease and aids in the creation of small bubbles in the soap. This, along with its ability to suspend dirt in mixtures, can make soaps and other cleaning products more efficient.

=== Textile uses ===
CMC is used in textiles as a thickening agent in textile printing, constituting about 2-3% of printing pastes. It is also used in fabric finishing to affect the fabric's texture. Additionally, CMC serves as a binding agent in non-woven fabrics, contributing to the strength and stability of the material. In sizing applications, about 1-3% of CMC is used to protect yarns during weaving to reduce breakages.

CMC aids in thickening printing pastes, which makes the prints themselves more precise. It is also used to thicken dyes. Additionally, it is an alternative to synthetic thickeners.

=== Cosmetics uses ===
CMC is an ingredient used in over 50% of cosmetic products. As a thickening agent, it is used in formulations where viscosity needs to be precisely controlled. In hair care, about 25% of shampoos and conditioners utilize CMC for its conditioning and detangling effects. It is also used in the makeup and toothpaste industries to control the products' texture. Due to its ability to retain moisture, it is also used in skincare products. CMC serves as a film-forming agent in approximately 10% of sunscreens.

CMC aids in pigment suspension and dispersion, binding other ingredients for even distribution. CMC, when combined with Fatty Acid Ethanolamine or 2,2'-Iminodiethanol in a hair product, can form a thin film around the hair.

=== Oil Drilling ===
As a thickening agent, CMC can increase the viscosity of drilling fluids and form a network structure in the mud, thereby enhancing their suspension capacity. CMC can effectively protect the wellbore and manage the penetration and loss of moisture in the drilling fluid. Ultra-high viscosity Sodium Carboxymethyl Cellulose can be used in fracturing fluids, primarily to carry fillers into oil wells.

=== Medical applications ===
CMC is also used in numerous medical applications.

Some examples include:

- Device for epistaxis (nose bleeding). A poly-vinyl chloride (PVC) balloon is covered by CMC knitted fabric reinforced by nylon. The device is soaked in water to form a gel, which is inserted into the nose of the patient and inflated. The combination of the inflated balloon and the therapeutic effect of the CMC stops the bleeding.
- Hydrofiber fabric used as a medical dressing following ear, nose, and throat surgical procedures.
- Water is added to form a gel, and this gel is inserted into the sinus cavity following surgery.
- In ophthalmology, CMC is used as a lubricating agent in artificial tears solutions for the treatment of dry eyes.
- In veterinary medicine, CMC is used in abdominal surgeries in large animals, particularly horses, to prevent the formation of bowel adhesions.

=== Research applications ===
Insoluble CMC (water-insoluble) can be used in the purification of proteins, particularly in the form of charged filtration membranes or as granules in cation-exchange resins for ion-exchange chromatography. Its low solubility is a result of a lower DS value (the number of carboxymethyl groups per anhydroglucose unit in the cellulose chain) compared to soluble CMC. Insoluble CMC offers physical properties similar to insoluble cellulose, while the negatively charged carboxylate groups allow it to bind to positively charged proteins. Insoluble CMC can also be chemically cross-linked to enhance the mechanical strength of the material.

Moreover, CMC has been used extensively to characterize enzyme activity from endoglucanases (part of the cellulase complex); it is a highly specific substrate for endo-acting cellulases, as its structure has been engineered to decrystallize cellulose and create amorphous sites that are ideal for endoglucanase action. CMC is desirable because the catalysis product (glucose) is easily measured using a reducing sugar assay, such as 3,5-dinitrosalicylic acid. Using CMC in enzyme assays is especially important in screening for cellulase enzymes that are needed for more efficient cellulosic ethanol conversion. CMC was misused in early work with cellulase enzymes, as many had associated whole cellulase activity with CMC hydrolysis. As the mechanism of cellulose depolymerization became better understood, it became clear that exo-cellulases are dominant in the degradation of crystalline (e.g. Avicel) and not soluble (e.g. CMC) cellulose.

=== Other uses ===
In laundry detergents, it is used as a soil suspension polymer designed to deposit onto cotton and other cellulosic fabrics, creating a negatively charged barrier to soils in the wash solution. CMC is also used as a thickening agent, for example, in the oil-drilling industry as an ingredient of drilling mud, where it acts as a viscosity modifier and water retention agent.

CMC is sometimes used as an electrode binder in advanced battery applications (i.e. lithium ion batteries), especially with graphite anodes. CMC's water solubility allows for less toxic and costly processing than with non-water-soluble binders, like the traditional polyvinylidene fluoride (PVDF), which requires toxic n-methylpyrrolidone (NMP) for processing. CMC is often used in conjunction with styrene-butadiene rubber (SBR) for electrodes requiring extra flexibility, e.g. for use with silicon-containing anodes.

CMC is also used in ice packs to form a eutectic mixture resulting in a lower freezing point, and therefore more cooling capacity than ice.

Aqueous solutions of CMC have also been used to disperse carbon nanotubes, where the long CMC molecules are thought to wrap around the nanotubes, allowing them to be dispersed in water.

In conservation-restoration, it is used as an adhesive or fixative (commercial name Walocel, Klucel).

== Adverse reactions ==
Effects on inflammation, microbiota-related metabolic syndrome, and colitis are a subject of research. Carboxymethyl cellulose, along with other emulsifiers, is suggested as a possible cause of inflammation of the gut, through alteration of the human gastrointestinal microbiota, and has been suggested as a triggering factor in inflammatory bowel diseases such as ulcerative colitis and Crohn's disease. A small randomized human study found that consumption of high amounts of CMC altered gut microbiota composition and was associated with increased gastrointestinal discomfort.

While thought to be uncommon, case reports of severe reactions to CMC exist. Skin testing is believed to be a useful diagnostic tool for this purpose.

== See also ==
- Croscarmellose sodium
- Hydroxypropyl cellulose
- Hydroxypropyl methylcellulose
- Methyl cellulose
