= Benedict's reagent =

Chemical reagent

Benedict's test
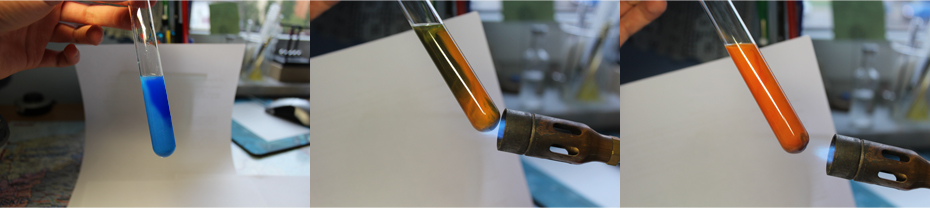
- Positive Benedict's test
- Classification: Colorimetric method
- Analytes: Reducing sugars

Benedict's reagent (often called Benedict's qualitative solution or Benedict's solution) is a chemical reagent and complex mixture of sodium carbonate, sodium citrate, and copper(II) sulfate pentahydrate. It is often used in place of Fehling's solution to detect the presence of reducing sugars and other reducing substances. Tests that use this reagent are called Benedict's tests. A positive result of Benedict's test is indicated by a color change from clear blue to brick-red with a precipitate.

Generally, Benedict's test detects the presence of aldehyde groups, alpha-hydroxy-ketones, and hemiacetals, including those that occur in certain ketoses. In example, although the ketose fructose is not strictly a reducing sugar, it is an alpha-hydroxy-ketone which results to a positive test because the base component of Benedict converts it into aldoses glucose and mannose. Oxidizing the reducing sugar by the cupric (Cu^{2+}) complex of the reagent produces a cuprous (Cu^{+}), which precipitates as insoluble red copper(I) oxide (Cu_{2}O).

The test is named after American chemist Stanley Rossiter Benedict.

== Composition and preparation ==
Benedict's reagent is a deep-blue aqueous solution. Each litre contains:

- 17.3 g copper sulfate
- 173 g sodium citrate
- 100 g anhydrous sodium carbonate or, equivalently, 270 g sodium carbonate decahydrate

Separate solutions of the reagents are made. The sodium carbonate and sodium citrate are mixed first, and then the copper sulfate is added slowly with constant stirring.

Sodium citrate acts as a complexing agent which keeps Cu^{2+} in solution, since it would otherwise precipitate. Sodium carbonate serves to keep the solution alkaline. In the presence of mild reducing agents, the copper(II) ion is reduced to copper(I), which precipitates in the alkaline conditions as very conspicuous red copper(I) oxide.

== Organic analysis ==
To test for the presence of monosaccharides and reducing disaccharide sugars in food, the food sample is dissolved in water and a small amount of Benedict's reagent is added. During a water bath, which is usually 4–10 minutes, the solution should progress through the colors of blue (with no reducing sugar present), orange, yellow, green, red, and then brick red precipitate or brown (if a high concentration of reducing sugar is present). A color change would signify the presence of a reducing sugar.

Experiment	Observation	Inference
Substance in water + 3 mL Benedict's solution, then boil for few minutes and allow to cool.	Red, green, or yellow precipitate is obtained	Reducing sugar, such as glucose, is present
Substance in water + 3 mL Benedict's solution, then boil for few minutes and allow to cool.	Solution remains clear or is a little blue	Reducing sugar is not present

The common disaccharides lactose and maltose are directly detected by Benedict's reagent because each contains a glucose with a free reducing aldehyde moiety after isomerization.

Sucrose (table sugar) contains two sugars (fructose and glucose) joined by their glycosidic bond in such a way as to prevent the glucose undergoing isomerization to an aldehyde, or fructose to alpha-hydroxy-ketone form. Sucrose is thus a non-reducing sugar which does not react with Benedict's reagent. However, sucrose indirectly produces a positive result with Benedict's reagent if heated with dilute hydrochloric acid prior to the test, although it is modified during this treatment as the acidic conditions and heat break the glycosidic bond in sucrose through hydrolysis. The products of sucrose decomposition are glucose and fructose, both of which can be detected by Benedict's reagent as described above.

Starches do not react or react very poorly with Benedict's reagent because of lesser number of reducing sugar components that occur at the ends of the carbohydrate chains. Other carbohydrates which produce a negative result include inositol.

Benedict's reagent can also be used to test for the presence of glucose in urine, elevated levels of which is known as glucosuria. Glucosuria can be indicative of diabetes mellitus, but Benedict's test is not recommended or used for diagnosis of the aforementioned condition. This is due to the possibility of a reaction in which the presence of other reducing substances such as ascorbic acid, drugs (levodopa, contrast used in radiological procedures) and homogentisic acid (alkaptonuria) creates a false positive.

As color of the obtained precipitate can be used to infer the quantity of sugar present in the solution, the test is semi-quantitative. A greenish precipitate indicates about 0.5 g% concentration; yellow precipitate indicates 1 g% concentration; orange indicates 1.5 g% concentration; and red indicates 2 g% or higher concentration.

== Quantitative reagent ==
Benedict's quantitative reagent contains potassium thiocyanate and is used to quantitatively determine the concentration of reducing sugars. This solution forms a copper thiocyanate precipitate which is white and can be used in titration. The titration should be repeated with 1% glucose solution instead of the sample for calibration.

== Net reaction ==
The net reaction between an aldehyde (or an alpha-hydroxy-ketone) and the copper(II) ions in Benedict's solution may be written as:

RCHO + 2 Cu^{2+} + 5 OH^{−} → RCOO^{−} + Cu_{2}O + 3 H_{2}O.

The hydroxide ions in the equation forms when sodium carbonate dissolves in water. With the citrate included, the reaction becomes:

RCHO + 2 Cu(C_{6}H_{5}O_{7})^{−} + 5 OH^{−} → RCOO^{−} + Cu_{2}O + 2 C_{6}H_{5}O_{7}^{3–} + 3 H_{2}O.

== See also ==
- Dextrose equivalent

Other oxidizing reagents

- Fehling's solution
- Tollens' reagent

Other reducing reagents

- Jones reductor
- Walden reductor
