= C6H6N4O4 =

The molecular formula C_{6}H_{6}N_{4}O_{4} (molar mass: 198.14 g/mol, exact mass: 198.0389 u) may refer to:

- 2,4-Dinitrophenylhydrazine
- Nitrofurazone
