= Franz von Soxhlet =

German agricultural chemist (1848–1926)

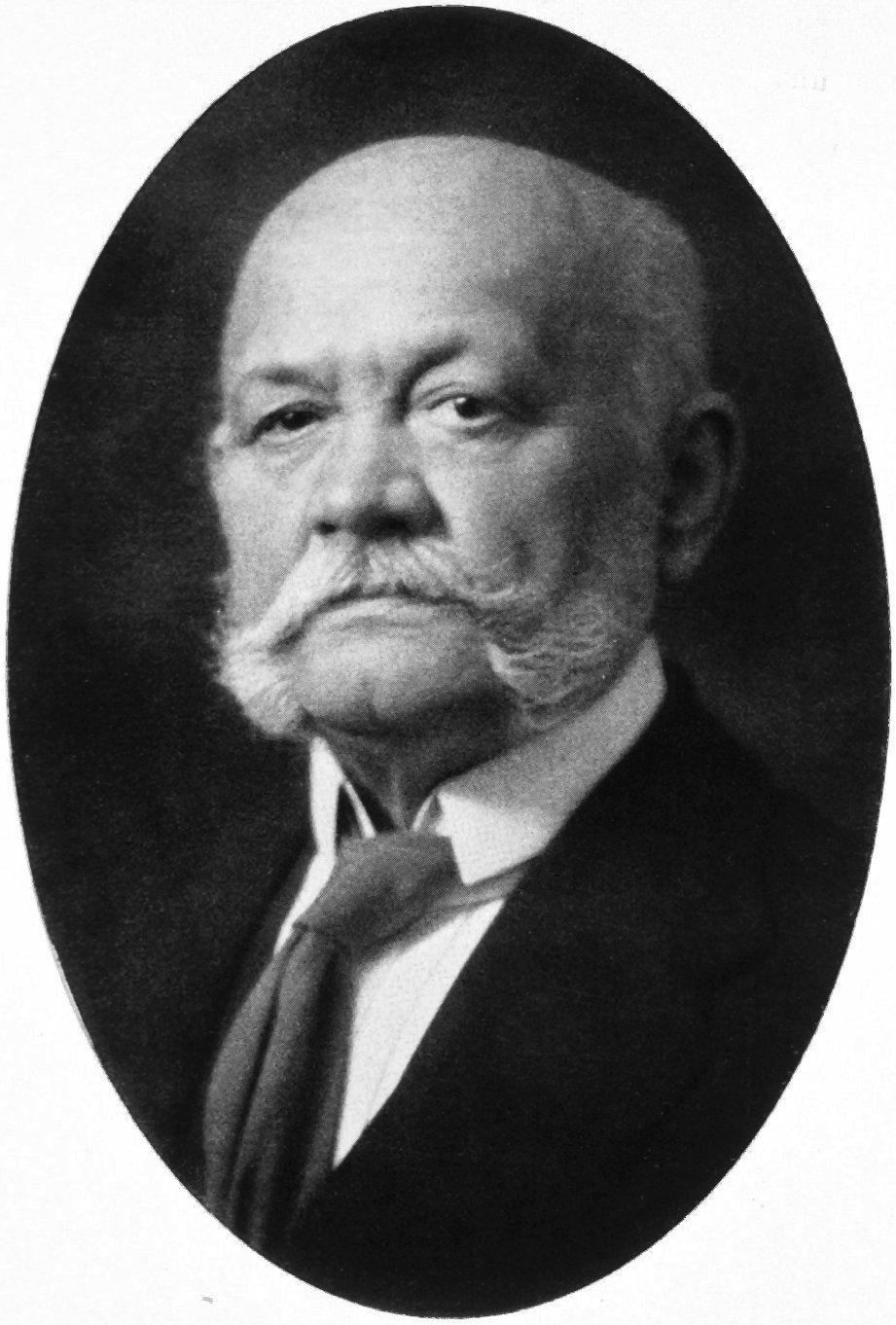
Prof. Dr. phil. Dr. med. h. c. Franz Ritter von Soxhlet

Franz Ritter von Soxhlet (12 January 1848 – 5 May 1926) was a German agricultural chemist and inventor.

== Biography ==
Soxhlet extractor

Franz von Soxhlet was born on 12 January 1848 in Brno, Moravia, Austrian Empire and migrated with his family to the German Confederation. He was the son of spinning industrialist Hubert Soxhlet, an immigrant from Dalhem near Liège (in the former Duchy of Brabant).

He gained a PhD at Leipzig in 1872 with the dissertation Zur physiologischen Chemie der Milch. In 1879, he became a professor of agricultural chemistry at the Technical University of Munich.

He invented the Soxhlet extractor in 1879 and in 1886 he proposed pasteurization be applied to milk and other beverages in order to prevent disease and spoilage.

Soxhlet is also known as the first scientist who fractionated the milk proteins in casein, albumin, globulin and lactoprotein. Furthermore, he described for the first time the sugar present in milk, lactose. The Soxhlet solution is an alternative to Fehling's solution for preparation of a comparable cupric/tartrate reagent to test for reducing sugars.

== Death ==
He died on 5 May 1926 in Munich, at the age of 78, and was buried alongside his wife at the Alter Friedhof Pöcking, Starnberg.

== Family ==
Franz was married to Helene Maria, née Dreßler (1847–1914). They had two children: Son Erich, Dipl.-Ing. in Munich, and daughter Helene (1881–1955), who married Lieutenant Colonel Walter von Lossow (1872–1943).

== Honours (excerpt) ==
- Order of Saint Michael (Bavaria), Knight 2nd Class
- Honorary doctorate (Dr. med. h. c.) from the University of Halle in 1894
- Awarded the honorary title of Privy Councilor (Geheimer Hofrat) in 1911

== Sources ==
- Rosenau, M.J.: The Milk Question, Houghton Mifflin Company, Boston, 1913.
- Soxhlet, F.: Die gewichtsanalytische Bestimmung des Milchfettes, Polytechnisches J. (Dingler's) 1879, 232, 461
- Rommel, Otto: Franz von Soxhlet Münchener Medizinische Wochenschrift 73 (1926) 994–995
- Österreichisches Biographisches Lexikon, XII. Band, [Schwarz] Marie – Spannagel Rudolf, Wien 2005
