= Barfoed =

Barfoed is a Danish surname. Notable people with the surname include:

- Christen Thomsen Barfoed (1815–1899), Danish chemist
- Kasper Barfoed (born 1972), Danish film director
- Lars Barfoed (born 1957), Danish politician
