= SMIM15 =

Mammalian protein found in Homo sapiens

Identifiers
- Aliases: SMIM15, C5orf43, small integral membrane protein 15
- External IDs: MGI: 1922866; HomoloGene: 90075; GeneCards: SMIM15; OMA:SMIM15 - orthologs

Gene location (Human)
Chr.	Chromosome 5 (human)
Band	5q12.1	Start	61,157,704 bp
Band	5q12.1	End	61,162,468 bp

Gene location (Mouse)
Chr.	Chromosome 13 (mouse)
Band	13|13 D2.1	Start	108,180,980 bp
Band	13|13 D2.1	End	108,185,706 bp
RNA expression pattern
Bgee	Human / Mouse (ortholog); Top expressed in: mucosa of ileum; palpebral conjunctiva; mucosa of sigmoid colon; jejunal mucosa; mucosa of paranasal sinus; epithelium of nasopharynx; corpus epididymis; germinal epithelium; caput epididymis; skin of arm / Top expressed in: hand; otolith organ; utricle; left colon; mesenteric lymph nodes; epithelium of stomach; left lung lobe; molar; genital tubercle; endothelial cell of lymphatic vessel; More reference expression data
BioGPS	n/a
Orthologs
Species	Human	Mouse
Entrez	643155	75616
Ensembl	ENSG00000188725	ENSMUSG00000071180
UniProt	Q7Z3B0	Q3UTD9
RefSeq (mRNA)	NM_001048249	NM_001048250
RefSeq (protein)	NP_001041714	NP_001041715
Location (UCSC)	Chr 5: 61.16 – 61.16 Mb	Chr 13: 108.18 – 108.19 Mb
PubMed search
- Wikidata
View/Edit Human	View/Edit Mouse

SMIM15 (small integral membrane protein 15) is a protein in humans that is encoded by the SMIM15 gene. It is a transmembrane protein that interacts with PBX4. Deletions where SMIM15 is located have produced mental defects and physical deformities. The gene has been found to have ubiquitous but variable expression in many tissues throughout the body.

== Gene ==
Small integral membrane protein 15 (SMIM15) is a protein in humans that is encoded by the SMIM15 gene. It has also been known under the aliases C5orf43 and GC05M060454. It is made up of 74 amino acids. It is located at 5q12.1. SMIM15 has 4741 base pairs with three exons.

== mRNA ==
SMIM15 has zero isoforms The 5' UTR region spans 420 bases and the 3' UTR spans 2243 bases.

Table 1. Exon Locations within Human SMIM15 mRNA
Exon	Number of Base Pairs	Start and End Locations
1	252	61162217 – 61162468
2	140	61161088 – 61161227
3	2496	61157704 – 61160199

== Protein ==
Primary sequence of SMIM15 is: MFDIKAWAEY VVEWAAKDPY GFLTTVILAL TPLFLASAVL SWKLAKMIEA REKEQKKKQK. RQENIAKAKR LKKD

Molecular weight of SMIM15 has been found to be 8.6 kdal and it has a pI of 9.82. There are no significant compositional features compositional features like charge clusters, hydrophobic segments, charge runs, patterns, multiplets or periodicities.

=== Domains and motifs ===
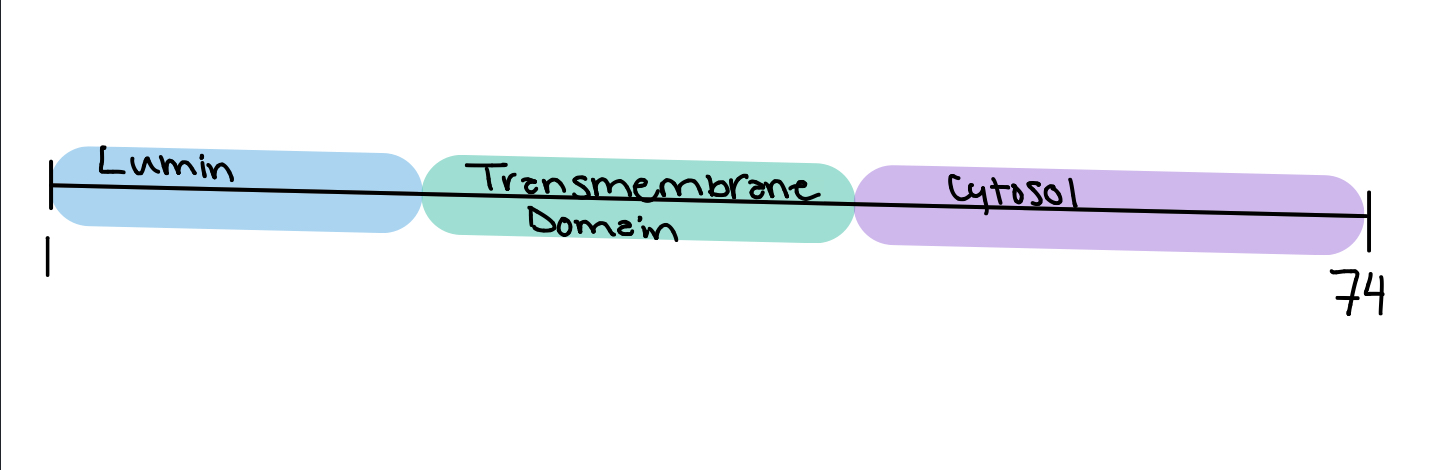
Schematic of Human SMIM15 Domains

There is one transmembrane domain located from amino acids 20 – 42.

The other domains include a luminal domain from amino acids 1 - 19 and cytosolic domain from amino acids 43 - 74.

=== Secondary structure ===
The secondary structure for SMIM15 is largely alpha-helical with alpha helices making up 62.16% (46 amino acids) of the protein. Random coil makes up 25.68% (19 amino acids) and extended strands make up 12.16% (9 amino acids) of the SMIM15 protein.

=== Post-translational modifications ===
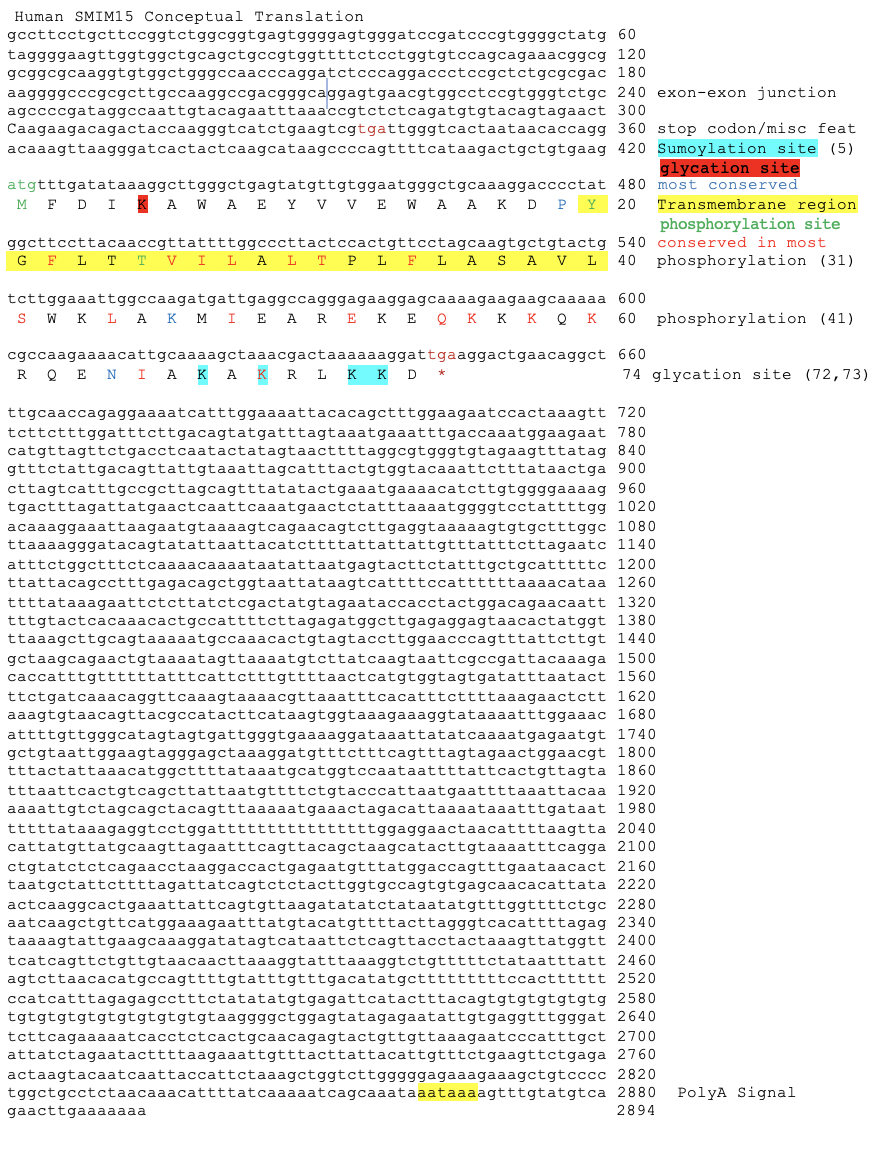
Figure 1. Conceptual Translation for the Human SMIM15

There are a number of post-translational modifications of the SMIM15 protein, which are shown in the Conceptual Translation of Human SMIM15 as shown in figure 1.

The predicted sites for sumoylation are at positions: 5, 67, 69, 72, 73. It is known to affect protein stability, protect from degradation, cellular localization, protein-protein interactions and DNA binding.

The predicted sites for glycation are at positions: 5, 43, 58, 72, 73. Glycation can lead to the creation of AGE (advanced glycation end products. Glycation is a process in which proteins react with reducing sugar molecules, which will lead to impairment of the function and changes the characteristics of the protein.

Finally, there are four predicted sites for phosphorylation of tyrosine on position 20, threonine on positions 25 and 31, and serine on position 41. Phosphorylation will affect different cellular processes and thus regulating protein function.

=== Subcellular localization ===
SMIM15 has a transmembrane domain found within amino acids 20–42. There are cleavage sites at the C-terminous and nuclear localization signals.

== Expression ==
SMIM15 has been found to have ubiquitous but variable expression in many different tissues throughout the body. it has the highest level of expression within the prostate. There are lower levels of expression within skeletal muscles compared to other tissues within the body.

=== Regulation of expression ===
==== Epigenetic ====
SMIM15 has one CpG island within the promoter. SMIM15 has lower levels of H3K4Me1 but higher levels of H3K4Me3 and H3K27Ac across all of their cell lines.

==== Transcriptional ====
The Promoter region for SMIM15 is 1049 base pairs long. and it is known as GXP_922465. There are 431 different transcription binding factor sites, some of these binding factors include GATA1, TGIF, LMX1A, and NKX61

==== Translational and mRNA stability ====
There are no known micro-RNA targets in the 3' UTR. mRNA secondary structures exhibited a high number of predicted stem-loop structures. This could indicate high stability of the mRNA transcript, and some binding sites for regulatory mechanisms.

==== Function ====
The function of SMIM15 is currently not well understood.

== Interacting Proteins ==
There is only one interacting protein currently identified. This protein is PBX4, which is known for playing critical roles in embryonic development and cellular differentiation both as Hox cofactors and through Hox - independent pathways. PBX4 is also a member of the pre-B cell leukemia transcription factor family.

== Clinical Significance ==
Deletion of 5q12.1 can lead to the development of mental retardation and ocular defects. Another deletion in the 5q12.1 - 5q12.3 region lead to mental-motor retardation and dysmorphia. In terms of diseases, Caries is a multifactorial disease and little is still known about the host genetic factors influencing susceptibility. The interval 5q12.1-5q13.3 as linked to low caries susceptibility in Filipino families.

== Homology ==
SMIM15 is conserved in both vertebrates and invertebrates. It is not found in insects or fungi. SMIM15 does not have any paralogs and the farthest known relative of the Homo sapiens SMIM15 is found within Trichoplax sp.H2 with a date of divergence 747 MYA.
