= Gammel Strand 50 =

Building in Copenhagen

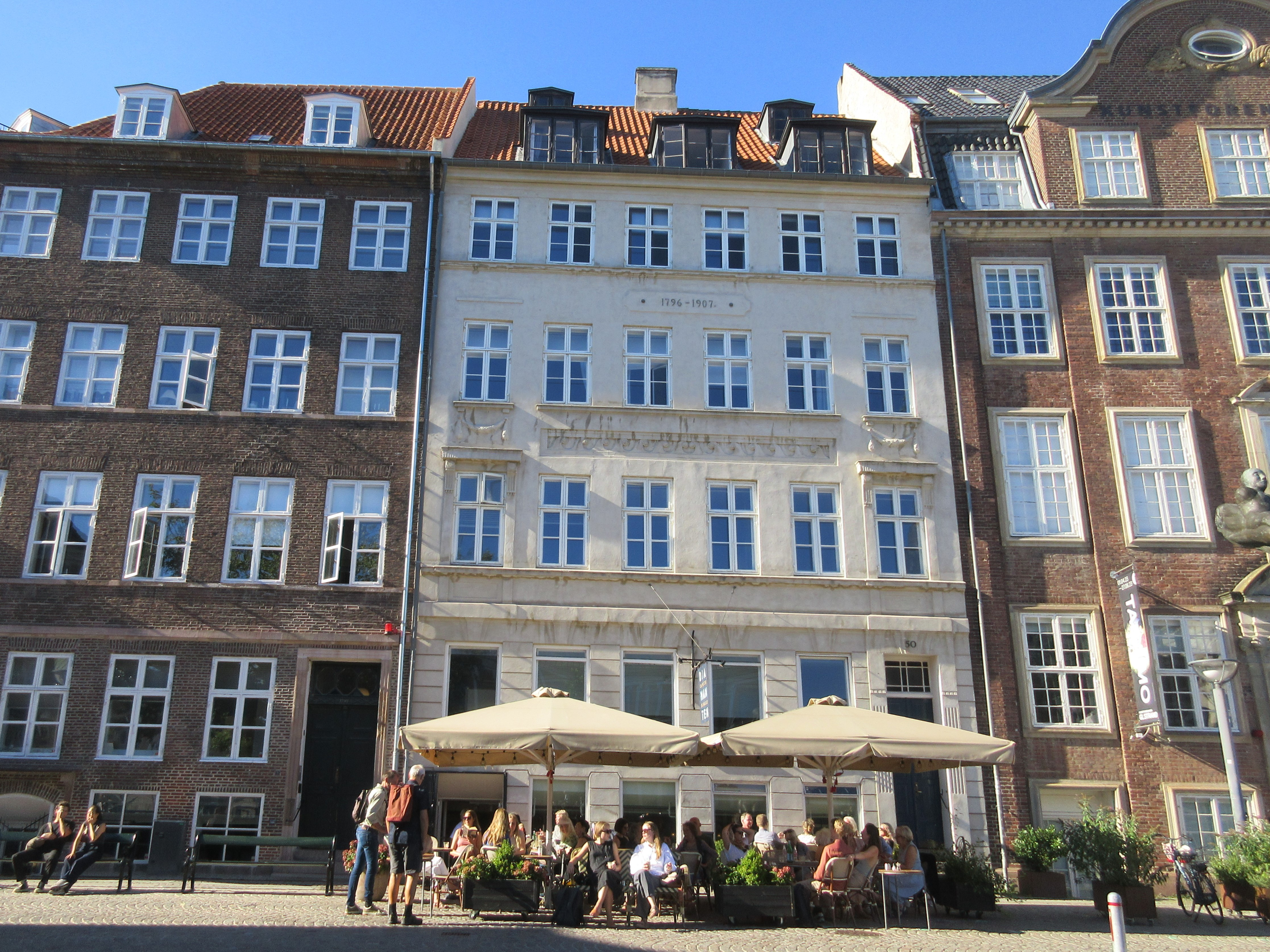
- Interactive map of the Gammel Strand 50 area

General information
- Location: Copenhagen, Denmark
- Coordinates: 55°40′39.02″N 12°34′38.92″E
- Completed: 1797

Design and construction
- Main contractor: Hans Christian Ondrup

Gammel Strand 50 is a Neoclassical building overlooking Slotsholmens Kanal in central Copenhagen, Denmark. It was constructed as part of the rebuilding of the city following the Copenhagen Fire of 1795. The building was listed on the Danish registry of protected buildings and places in 1918. Notable former residents include the musician Holger Simon Paulli, chemist Christen Thomsen Barfoed and author Hans Vilhelm Kaalund-

== History ==
=== Site history, 1689–1795 ===
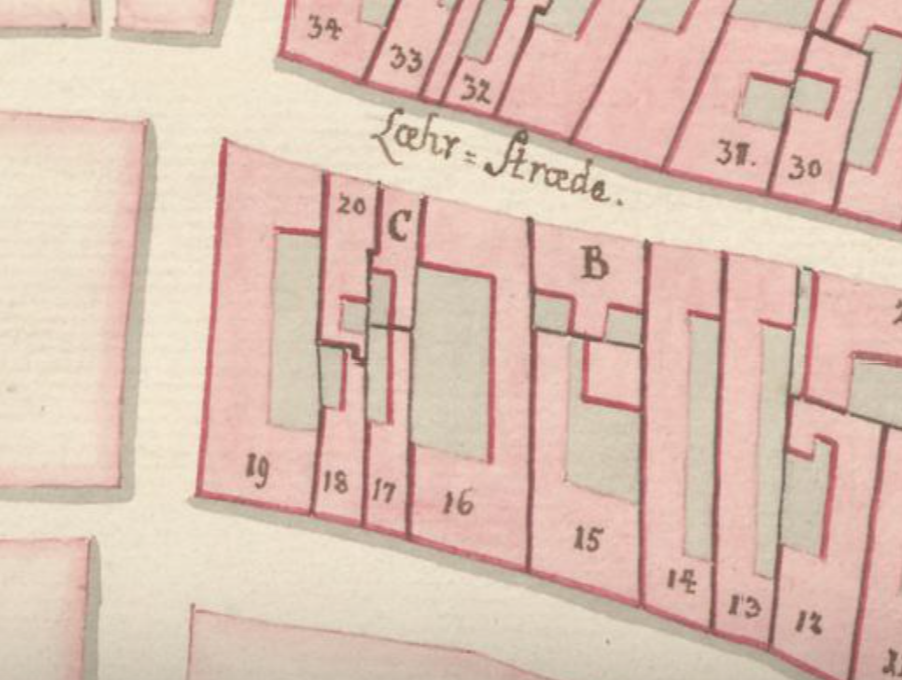
No. 17 and No. 18 seen on a detail from Christian Gedde's map of Strand Quarter, 1756.

The site was formerly part of two separate properties. They were listed in Copenhagen's first cadastre of 1689 as No. 17 and No. 18 in Strand Quarter. They were at that time owned by Anders Søbødker (No. 17) and one Jens Pedersen's widow Bente (No. 18):

The two properties were again listed as No. 17 and No. 18 in the new cadastre of 1756. They were at that time owned by Jens Hansen (No. 17) and coppersmith Johan Christian Schellerup (No. 18).

The properties were both destroyed in the Copenhagen Fire of 1795. The fire spread along the waterfront from the east and was stopped just one house further to the west at the street Naboløs.

=== Gudmand Petersen and the new building ===
No. 17 was subsequently merged with part of No. 18 by hat maker Gudman Petersen. The present building on the site was constructed for him in 1796-97.

Gudman Petersen's property was home to six households at the 1801 census. Gudman Petersen resided in the building with his wife Ane Cathrine Petersen (née Holtz) and their two children (aged one and five). Petersen's sister Augysta Cathrine Petersen (widow) resided in another apartment with her 17-year-old daughter Christiane Margrethe Hansen, three maids and two hatter's apprentices. Christian Ulrich Kaas (1731-1803), a former harbour master in Copenhagen with title of chamberlain, resided in the building with his wife Mette Cathrine Lund (1747-1815) and one maid. Marie Elisabeth Otteburg, a widow, resided in the building with two lodgers. Friderich Fischer, an auctioner, resided in the building with his wife Hedevig Møller, their two-year-old son and one maid.

The property was listed in the new cadastre of 1806 as No. 15 in Strand Quarter. It was at that time still owned by Gudmand Petersen.

=== Marx family ===
The property was probably later acquired by master hatter David Marx (1769-1829). This assumption is based on the fact that he died in Strand Quarter and that his widow operated the hatter's workshop on the site in 1840. The musician Holger Simon Paulli was a resident of the building in 1838.

At the time of the 1840 census, No. 15 was home to one household on each floor. Fridericke Christine Marx (née Greiter, 1778-1855), a widow hatter, resided on the ground floor with her 28-year-old daughter Anine Victorine Franzine Marx, her 56-year-old brother Wendel Christine Greiter, her floor clerk Johanne Antoinette Geisler and the maid Mariane Catharine Keimer. Maria Andrea Sehested Krag and Sophie Augusta Krag, two unmarried women, most likely relatives, resided on the first floor with one maid. Anne Marie Plenge (née Tronier, 1793-1880), widow of Johannes Wilhelm Plenge, former pastor of Hørsholm Parish, resided on the second floor with her three children (aged 16 to 20) and one maid. Niels Eibe and Frederik Hendrik Eibe (aged 31 and 22), two theology students, resided on the third floor. Niels Larsen, who worked at the nearby Vejerhus, resided in the basement with his wife Johanne Cathrine Larsen and their two daughters (aged 12 and 17).

=== 1845–1900 ===
At the 1845 census, No. 15 was home to 39 residents. Johan Wigelsen Lassen, a master plumber, resided in the basement with his wife Sofie Frederikke Emilia (née Krøyer), their one-uear-old son Ferdinandt Emil Thorvald Lassen and his wife's sister Ane Magrethe Krøyer. Niels Larsen, a barkeeper and possibly the plumber's father, resided in the basement with his wife Johanne Cathrine Larsen and daughter Hanne Caroline Larsen. Hartvig Filip Hartvig, a grocer (urtelræmmer), resided on the ground floor with his wife Sofie Israel, their two children (aged one and two) and one maid. Franciszkus Koclowski, a man with means, resided on the first floor with his wife Maria Anna Ræventlow, three unmarried children (aged 39 to 44) and one maid. Ane Maria Plenge (née Trinier, 1792-1880; daughter of brewer Andreas Tronier), widow of former pastor of Hørsholm Parish Johannes Wilhelm Pienge (1784-1829), resided on the second floor with her three children (aged 20 to 28) and one maid. Frans Joseph Hense, a former master tailor, resided on the second floor with his 21-year-old daughter Rosalie Marie Wilhelmine Hense. Andreas Hansen, a brick-layer, resided in the garret with his wife Ane Johanne Marie Hal, their 12-uear-old daughter and two lodgers. Lars Jantzen, a shoemaker, resided in the garret with his wife Ane Chirstine Christensen, their five children (aged one to 13) and one lodger.

The writer Hans Vilhelm Kaalund (1818-1885) lived in the building around 1849.

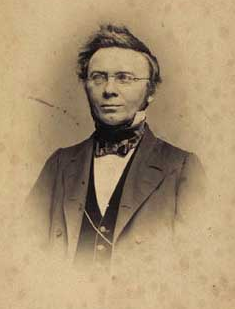
Christen Thomsen Barfoed.

The property was home to 36 residents in six households at the 1850 census. One half of the basement (left side) was still occupied by the master plumber Johan Vigelsen Lassen, He lived there with his wife Sophie Frederikke Emilie Lassen (née Krøyer), their now two children (aged two to six), 27-year-old Wilhelmine Madsen and two plumber's apprentices. Lauritz Rasmussen, a royal runner, resided on the ground floor with his wife Maren Kjerstine Rasmussen (née Kalsbølle) and his sister Frederikke Marie Petersen (née Rasmussen). Christen Thomsen Barfoed, a lecturer at the Royal Veterinary and Agricultural College and the Royal Military College, resided on the first floor with his wife Elise Petr. Hedvig Mathilde Barfoed (née Viborg, 1817—1897; daughter of Erik Viborg) and their two children (aged one and three). Anna Charlotte Amalie Viborg (née Nielsen, 1778–185), Barfoed's mother-in-law, resided on the same floor with two unmarried women. Joseph Wulff, a medical doctor and surgeon, resided on the second floor with his wife Karoline Wulff (née Seine), their four children (aged two to six), and two unmarried women. Birgitte Baruch, a widow seamstress, resided on the third floor with three children (aged 21 to 33), and five lodgers.

The building was heightened with one storey in 1853. The merchant C. W. Jøhncke lived in the building and ran his company from the premises in 1854. A clerk in the company, Hans Peder Kofod, tried to murder him by poisoning his coffee in 1856 after committing embezzlement. He was sentenced to death at the Supreme Court but the sentence was later converted to life in prison.

=== 1860s ===
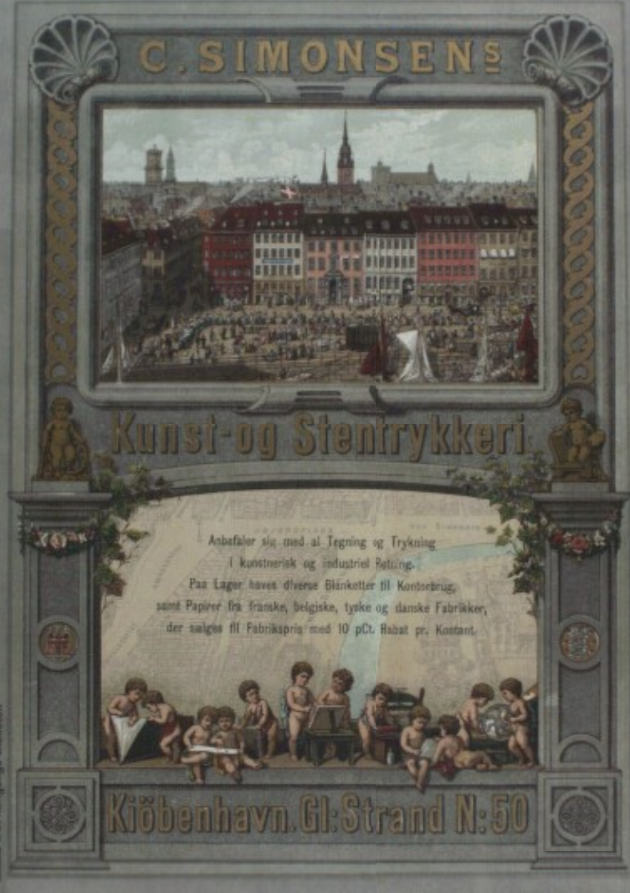
The building seen on an advertisement from C. Simonsens Kunst- og Stentrykkeri

The property was home to 38 residents at the time of the 1860 census. Moses Levin Nathan, a Class-Lottery collector, resided on the first floor with his wife Hanne Nathan (née Hartig), their son Marcus Moses Nathan and one maid. Joseph Wulff and his wife Line Wulff still occupied the second-floor apartment. They lived there with their six children (aged 4 to 17), one maid and the 20-year-old woman Juliane Møller. Johannes Rohner, a retired customs official, resided in the garret with his wife Ane Dorthea (née Petersen), the 39-year-old married woman Mariane Møller (née Hansen, no mention of her husband), Møller's 11-year-old daughter Josephine Marie Møller and the lodger Hans Fritz Mathisen (law student). Hans Christian Hansen, a barkeeper, resided in the basement with his wife Inger Christine (née Nielsen) and their 8-year-old daughter. Frederik Larsen, a candles and yarn retailer, resided in another part of the basement with his wife Elsebe Mammesen. Søren Christian Hansen, a fisherman (røgter), resided on the ground floor of the side wing with his wife Karen Hansen and their 5-year-old daughter. Wilhelm Lau, a brick-layer, resided on the third floor of the side wing with his wife Sophia Lau, two children (aged 4 and 13) and a maid.

C. Simonsens Kunst- og Stentrykkeri was later based in the building.
