= Crotonaldehyde 2,4-dinitrophenylhydrazone =

Names
- IUPAC name 1-(but-2-en-1-ylidene)-2-(2,4-dinitrophenyl)hydrazine
- Other names: 2-Butenal, (2,4-dinitrophenyl)hydrazone; N-[(E)-[(E)-but-2-enylidene]amino]-2,4-dinitroaniline; Crotonaldehyde-2,4-DNPH

Identifiers
CAS Number	1527-96-4
3D model (JSmol)	Interactive image
ChemSpider	7875473
PubChem CID	9601349
CompTox Dashboard (EPA)	DTXSID00425572
- InChI: InChI=1S/C10H10N4O4/c1-2-3-6-11-12-9-5-4-8(13(15)16)7-10(9)14(17)18/h2-7,12H,1H3/b3-2+,11-6+ Key: GFUVNGJSSAEZHW-PDGXAJGZSA-N
- SMILES: CC=CC=NNc1ccc([N+](=O)[O-])cc1[N+](=O)[O-]

Properties
Chemical formula	C_{10}H_{10}N_{4}O_{4}
Molar mass	250.214 g·mol^{−1}
- Except where otherwise noted, data are given for materials in their standard state (at 25 °C [77 °F], 100 kPa). Infobox references

Crotonaldehyde 2,4-dinitrophenylhydrazone is a chemical derivative used in laboratory analysis to identify and measure crotonaldehyde in laboratory and industrial settings.

== Chemistry ==
Crotonaldehyde 2,4-DNPH is a crystalline hydrazone derivative formed by the condensation reaction of crotonaldehyde and 2,4-dinitrophenylhydrazine.

== Applications ==
Crotonaldehyde 2,4-DNPH forms a stable, crystalline compound that makes it easier to detect and measure the original aldehyde via chromatography or spectrophotometry. It is also used in analytical testing to identify and measure carbonyl compounds in the air, including environmental pollutants related to vehicle exhaust or other combustion processes. Additionally, because the compound has a specific melting point, it can be used to help confirm the presence of crotonaldehyde during qualitative organic analysis.
