= 2,4-DNP =

2,4-DNP can mean:

- 2,4-Dinitrophenol, a small organic molecule formerly marketed as a pharmaceutical "diet aid"
- 2,4-Dinitrophenylhydrazine, Brady's reagent, used in organic chemical analysis
