= C7H6N2O5 =

The molecular formula C_{7}H_{6}N_{2}O_{5} (molar mass: 198.13 g/mol) may refer to:

- 3-Amino-5-nitrosalicylic acid
- 2,4-Dinitroanisole
- Dinitro-ortho-cresol
