= Sodium croscarmellose =

Chemical compound

Sodium croscarmellose is an internally cross-linked sodium carboxymethylcellulose for use as a superdisintegrant in pharmaceutical formulations.

E468 is the E number of crosslinked sodium carboxymethyl cellulose, used in food as an emulsifier.

== Background ==
The cross-linking reduces water solubility while still allowing the material to swell (like a sponge) and absorb many times its weight in water. As a result, it provides superior drug dissolution and disintegration characteristics, thus improving formulas' subsequent bioavailability by bringing the active ingredients into better contact with bodily fluids.

Sodium croscarmellose also resolves formulators' concerns over long-term functional stability, reduced effectiveness at high tablet hardness levels, and similar problems associated with other products developed to enhance drug dissolution. It is a very commonly used pharmaceutical additive approved by the U.S. Food and Drug Administration. Its purpose in most tablets – including dietary supplements – is to assist the tablet in disintegrating in the gastrointestinal tract promptly. If a tablet disintegrating agent is not included, the tablet could disintegrate too slowly, in the wrong part of the intestine or not at all, thereby reducing the efficacy and bioavailability of the active ingredients.

Croscarmellose is made by first soaking crude cellulose in sodium hydroxide, and then reacting the cellulose with sodium monochloroacetate to form sodium carboxymethylcellulose. Excess sodium monochloroacetate slowly hydrolyzes to glycolic acid and the glycolic acid catalyzes the cross-linkage to form sodium croscarmellose. Chemically, it is the sodium salt of a cross-linked, partly O-(carboxymethylated) cellulose.

Sodium croscarmellose was first used as a stabilizer in horse supplements.
