= 2,4-Dinitrophenylhydrazine =

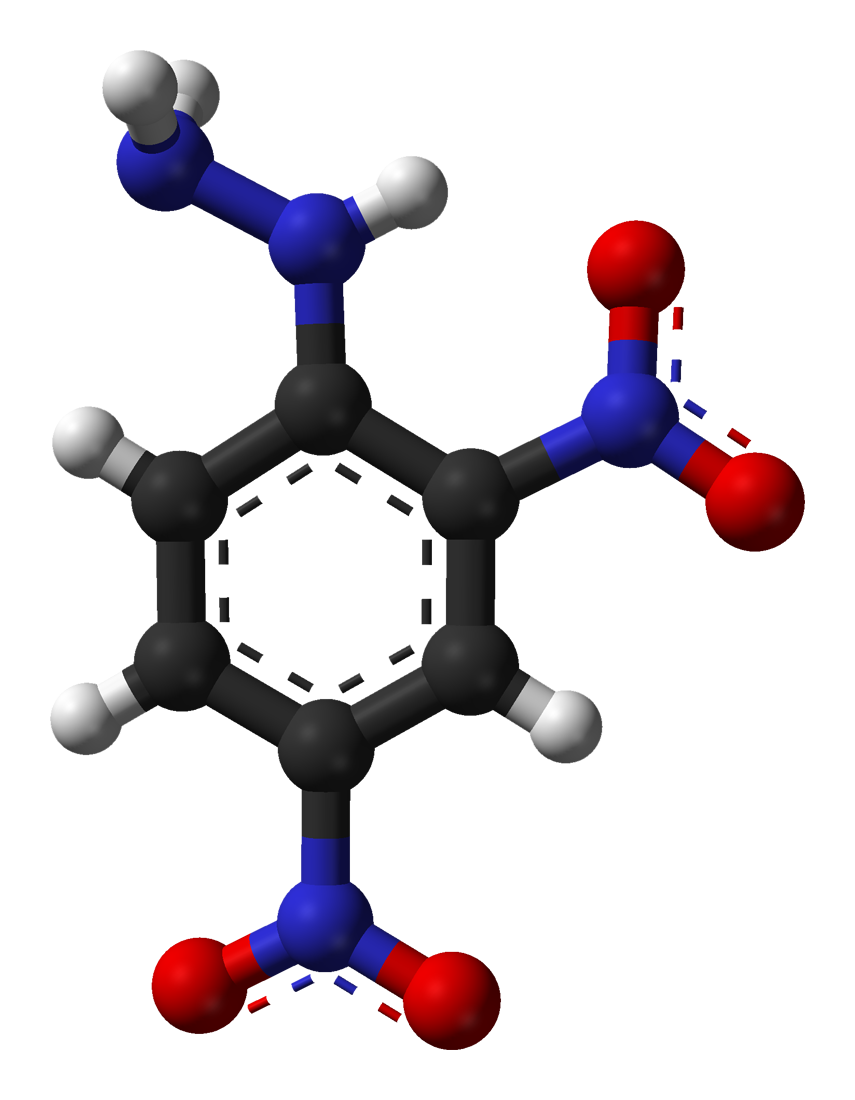

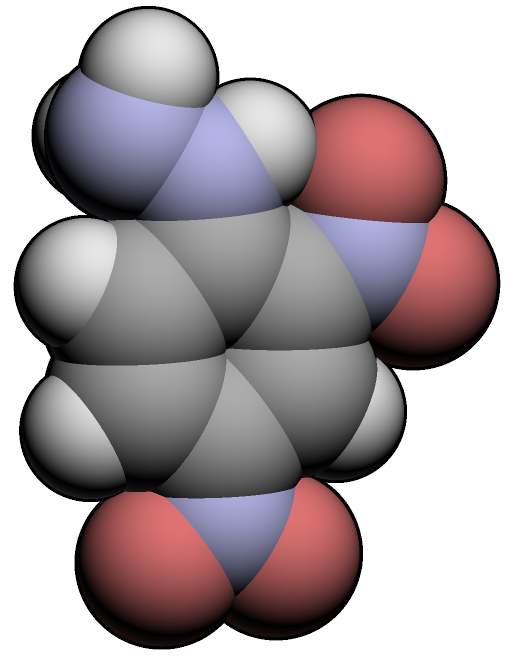

Names
- Preferred IUPAC name (2,4-Dinitrophenyl)hydrazine
- Other names 2,4-DNPH; 2,4-DNP; DNPH; Brady's reagent Borche's reagent

Identifiers
| CAS Number | 119-26-6 |
| 3D model (JSmol) | Interactive image |
| ChEBI | CHEBI:66932 |
| ChEMBL | ChEMBL352799 |
| ChemSpider | 3001507 |
| ECHA InfoCard | 100.003.918 |
| EC Number | 204-309-3 |
| KEGG | C11283 |
| PubChem CID | 3772977 |
| UNII | 1N39KD7QPJ |
| CompTox Dashboard (EPA) | DTXSID2059485 |
- InChI: InChI=1S/C6H6N4O4/c7-8-5-2-1-4(9(11)12)3-6(5)10(13)14/h1-3,8H,7H2 Key: HORQAOAYAYGIBM-UHFFFAOYSA-N; InChI=1/C6H6N4O4/c7-8-5-2-1-4(9(11)12)3-6(5)10(13)14/h1-3,8H,7H2 Key: HORQAOAYAYGIBM-UHFFFAOYAM
- SMILES: c1cc(c(cc1[N+](=O)[O-])[N+](=O)[O-])NN

Properties
| Chemical formula | C_{6}H_{6}N_{4}O_{4} |
| Molar mass | 198.14 g/mol |
| Appearance | Red or orange powder |
| Melting point | 198 to 202 °C (388 to 396 °F; 471 to 475 K) dec. |
| Solubility in water | Slight |

Hazards
- Occupational safety and health (OHS/OSH)
| Main hazards | Flammable, possibly carcinogenic |
- GHS labelling
| Pictograms | (GHS02: Flammable) (GHS07: Exclamation mark) |
| Signal word | Warning |
| Hazard statements | H228, H302, H319 |
| Precautionary statements | P210, P240, P241, P264, P270, P280, P301+P312, P305+P351+P338, P330, P337+P313, P370+P378, P501 |
| Safety data sheet (SDS) | MSDS |
- Except where otherwise noted, data are given for materials in their standard state (at 25 °C [77 °F], 100 kPa). verify (what is ?) Infobox references

2,4-Dinitrophenylhydrazine (2,4-DNPH or DNPH) is the organic compound C_{6}H_{3}(NO_{2})_{2}NHNH_{2}. DNPH is a red to orange solid. It is a substituted hydrazine. The solid is relatively sensitive to shock and friction. For this reason DNPH is usually handled as a wet powder. DNPH is a precursor to the drug Sivifene.

== Synthesis ==
It can be prepared by the reaction of hydrazine sulfate with 2,4-dinitrochlorobenzene:

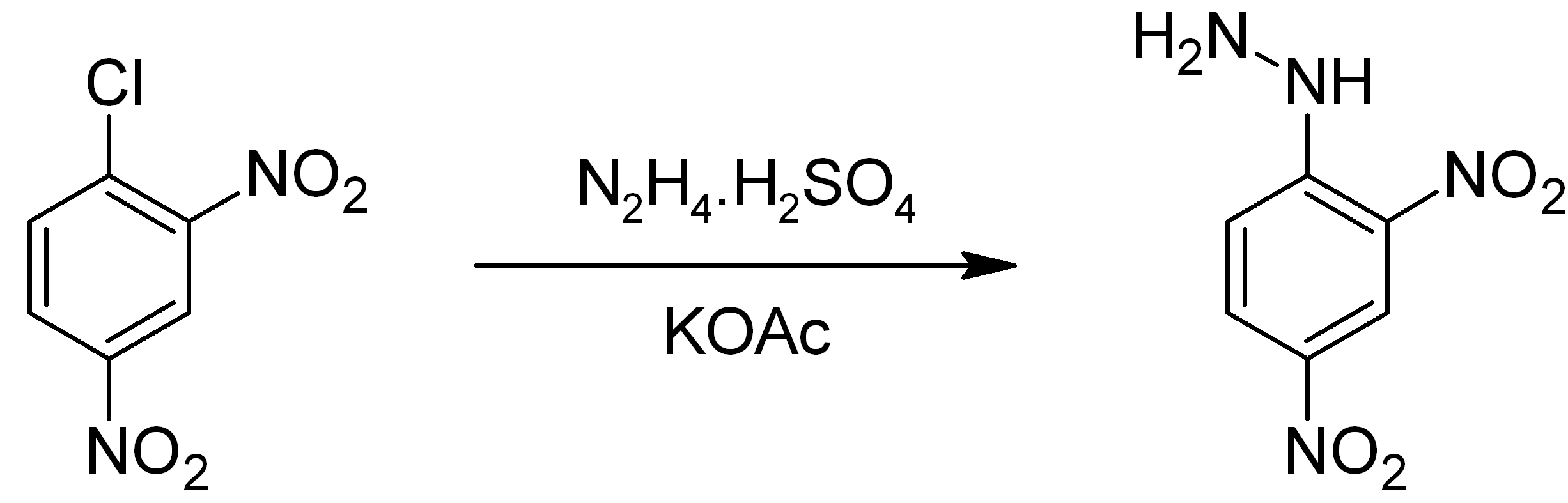

== DNP test ==
DNPH is a reagent in instructional analytical chemistry laboratories. Brady's reagent or Borche's reagent, is prepared by dissolving DNPH in a solution containing methanol and some concentrated sulfuric acid. This solution is used to detect ketones and aldehydes. A positive test is signalled by the formation of a yellow, orange or red precipitate of the dinitrophenylhydrazone. Aromatic carbonyls give red precipitates whereas aliphatic carbonyls give more yellow color. The reaction between DNPH and a generic ketone to form a hydrazone is shown below:

C_{6}H_{3}(NO_{2})_{2}NHNH_{2} + O=CRR' → C_{6}H_{3}(NO_{2})_{2}NHN=CRR' + H_{2}O

This reaction is, overall, a condensation reaction as two molecules joining together with loss of water. Mechanistically, it is an example of addition-elimination reaction: nucleophilic addition of the -NH_{2} group to the C=O carbonyl group, followed by the elimination of a H_{2}O molecule:

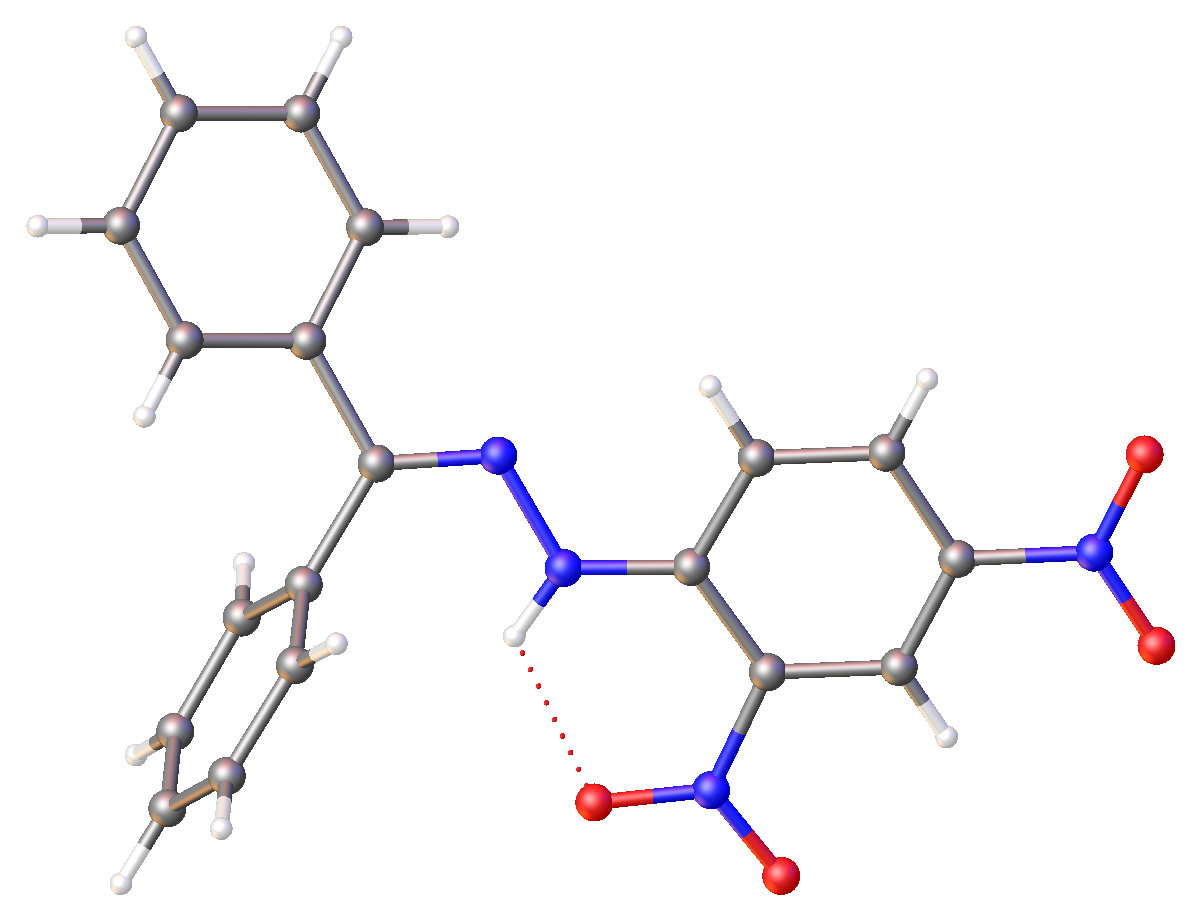
X-ray structure of DNP-derived hydrazone of benzophenone. Selected parameters: C=N, 128 pm; N-N, 1.38 pm, N-N-C(Ar), 119

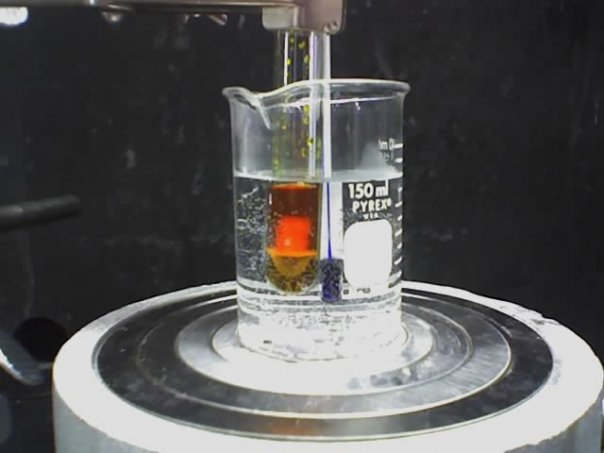
When 3-heptanone is added to a solution of 2,4-DNPH and heated, an orange-red precipitate forms.

DNP-derived hydrazones have characteristic melting points, facilitating identification of the carbonyl. In particular, the use of DNPH was developed by Brady and Elsmie. Modern spectroscopic and spectrometric techniques have superseded these techniques.

DNPH does not react with other carbonyl-containing functional groups such as carboxylic acids, amides, and esters, for which there is resonance-associated stability as a lone-pair of electrons interacts with the p orbital of the carbonyl carbon resulting in increased delocalization in the molecule. This stability would be lost by addition of a reagent to the carbonyl group. Hence, these compounds are more resistant to addition reactions. Also, with carboxylic acids, there is the effect of the compound acting as a base, leaving the resulting carboxylate negatively charged and hence no longer vulnerable to nucleophilic attack.

== Safety ==
Dry DNPH is friction and shock sensitive. For this reason, it is supplied damp or ‘wetted’ when a school purchases it from a chemical supplier. If DNPH is stored improperly and left to dry out, it can become explosive.

In 2016, following UK government advice for schools to check for dried out DNPH, bomb disposal teams carried out 589 controlled explosions at UK schools to dispose of potentially hazardous DNPH.

In 2026, a Norwegian high school was evacuated when a bottle of dried out DNPH was found in the school's chemistry lab.

== See also ==
- Tollens' reagent
- Fehling's reagent
- Schiff test
