= Barfoed's test =

Chemical test for monosaccharides

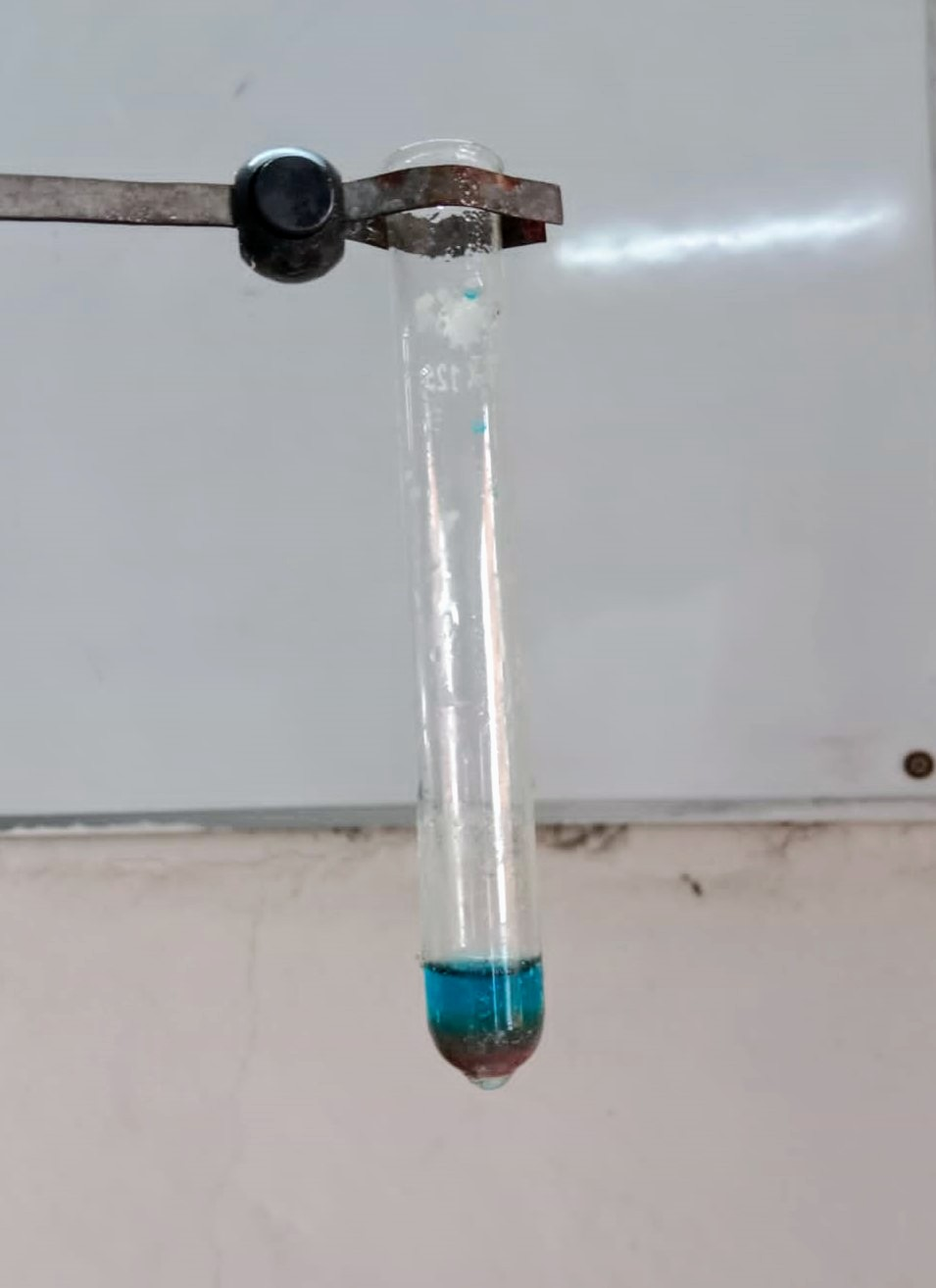
- Positive result in Barfoed's test
- Classification: Colorimetric method
- Analytes: Monosaccharides

Barfoed's test is a chemical test used for detecting the presence of monosaccharides. It is based on the reduction of copper(II) acetate to copper(I) oxide (Cu_{2}O), which forms a brick-red precipitate.

RCHO + 2Cu^{2+} + 2H_{2}O → RCOOH + Cu_{2}O↓ + 4H^{+}

(Disaccharides may also react, but the reaction is much slower.) The aldehyde group of the monosaccharide which normally forms a cyclic hemiacetal is oxidized to the carboxylate. A number of other substances, including sodium chloride, may interfere.

Its author is the Danish chemist Christen Thomsen Barfoed and it is primarily used in botany.

The test is similar to the reaction of Fehling's solution to aldehydes.

== Composition ==
Barfoed's reagent consists of a 0.33 mol dm^{−3} (molar) solution of copper(II) acetate in 1 % (0.17 mol dm^{−3}) acetic acid solution. The reagent does not keep well and it is therefore advisable to make it up when it is actually required.

== Procedure ==
1 drops of Barfoed's reagent is added to 2 mL of given sample in a test tube and boiled for 3 minutes and then allowed to cool. If a red precipitate occurs, a monosaccharide is present.
