= Tesmilifene =

Chemical compound

Clinical data
- Other names: BMS-217380-01; YMB-1002; DPPE

Identifiers
- IUPAC name: 2-(4-Benzylphenoxy)-N,N-diethylethanamine
- CAS Number: 98774-23-3 92981-78-7 (hydrochloride)
- PubChem CID: 108092
- DrugBank: DB04905
- ChemSpider: 97190
- UNII: I43T3ID6G2
- ChEBI: CHEBI:93414
- ChEMBL: ChEMBL26424
- CompTox Dashboard (EPA): DTXSID1045661

Chemical and physical data
- Formula: C_{19}H_{25}NO
- Molar mass: 283.415 g·mol^{−1}
- 3D model (JSmol): Interactive image
- SMILES: CCN(CC)CCOC1=CC=C(C=C1)CC2=CC=CC=C2
- InChI: InChI=1S/C19H25NO/c1-3-20(4-2)14-15-21-19-12-10-18(11-13-19)16-17-8-6-5-7-9-17/h5-13H,3-4,14-16H2,1-2H3; Key:NFIXBCVWIPOYCD-UHFFFAOYSA-N

Tesmilifene (INN; developmental code names YMB-1002, BMS-217380-01), also known as N,N-diethyl-2-(4-phenylmethyl)ethanamine (DPPE), is a small-molecule antineoplastic drug and chemopotentiator that was under development by YM BioSciences for the treatment of breast cancer in the 2000s but was never marketed. It reached phase III clinical trials for advanced/metastatic breast cancer before development was discontinued.

Tesmilifene is a diphenylmethane derivative that is structurally related to the triphenylethylene derivative tamoxifen but lacks the stilbene bridge and third phenyl ring necessary for binding to the estrogen receptor (ER), and as such, it is not a selective estrogen receptor modulator (SERM). In addition to tamoxifen, tesmilifene is structurally related to diphenylmethane antihistamines like diphenhydramine and hydroxyzine, but is much weaker than these agents in assays of anti-H_{1} receptor activity, and hence, neither acts as an antihistamine.

Tamoxifen is known to bind not only to the ER but also to non-ER so-called "antiestrogen binding sites" (AEBS) that are present in cell microsomes as opposed to the cell nucleus. Tesmilifene was developed as a selective ligand of the AEBS without ER affinity to investigate these sites and their role in the antineoplastic activity of tamoxifen. Histamine has been found to be a ligand of the AEBS, and it has been determined that the AEBS represent the substrate binding site of certain microsomal cytochrome P450 enzymes including CYP3A4, CYP2D6, and CYP1A1. Tesmilifene binds to and displaces histamine from these sites equipotently to tamoxifen and more strongly than conventional antihistamines, and this action has been found to correlate with the cytotoxic effects of tesmilifene in breast cancer cells in vitro. Moreover, in spite of its lack of affinity for the ER, tesmilifene antagonizes the uterotrophic effects of exogenous estrogen in vivo.

== See also ==
- Sivifene
