= Soxhlet extractor =

Laboratory apparatus

A schematic representation of a Soxhlet extractor: 1. Stirrer bar; 2. Still pot (the still pot should not be overfilled and the volume of the Soxhlet chamber should be 3 to 4 times the volume of the solvent in the still pot); 3. Distillation path; 4. Thimble; 5. Solid; 6. Siphon top; 7. Siphon exit; 8. Expansion adapter; 9. Condenser; 10. Cooling water out; 11. Cooling water in

A Soxhlet extractor is a piece of laboratory apparatus invented in 1879 by Franz von Soxhlet. It was originally designed for the extraction of a lipid from a solid material. Typically, Soxhlet extraction is used when the desired compound has a limited solubility in a solvent, and the impurity is insoluble in that solvent. It allows for unmonitored and unmanaged operation while efficiently recycling a small amount of solvent to dissolve a larger amount of material.

== Description ==
A Soxhlet extractor has three main sections: a percolator (boiler and reflux) which circulates the solvent, a thimble (usually made of thick filter paper) which retains the solid to be extracted, and a siphon mechanism, which periodically empties the condensed solvent from the thimble back into the percolator.

== Assembly ==
- The source material containing the compound to be extracted is placed inside the thimble.
- The thimble is loaded into the main chamber of the Soxhlet extractor.
- The extraction solvent to be used is placed in a distillation flask.
- The flask is placed on the heating element.
- The Soxhlet extractor is placed atop the flask.
- A reflux condenser is placed atop the extractor.

== Operation ==
The solvent is heated to reflux. The solvent vapour travels up a distillation arm, and floods into the chamber housing the thimble of solid. The condenser ensures that any solvent vapour cools, and drips back down into the chamber housing the solid material. The chamber containing the solid material slowly fills with warm solvent. Some of the desired compound dissolves in the cold solvent. When the Soxhlet chamber is almost full, the chamber is emptied by the siphon. The solvent is returned to the distillation flask. The thimble ensures that the rapid motion of the solvent does not transport any solid material to the still pot. This cycle may be allowed to repeat many times, over hours or days.

During each cycle, a portion of the non-volatile compound dissolves in the solvent. After many cycles the desired compound is concentrated in the distillation flask. The advantage of this system is that instead of many portions of warm solvent being passed through the sample, just one batch of solvent is recycled.

After extraction the solvent is removed, typically by means of a rotary evaporator, yielding the extracted compound. The non-soluble portion of the extracted solid remains in the thimble, and is usually discarded. Like Soxhlet extractor, the Kumagawa extractor has a specific design where the thimble holder/chamber is directly suspended inside the solvent flask (having a vertical large opening) above the boiling solvent. The thimble is surrounded by hot solvent vapour and maintained at a higher temperature compared to the Soxhlet extractor, thus allowing better extraction for compounds with higher melting points such as bitumen. The removable holder/chamber is fitted with a small siphon side arm and, in the same way as for Soxhlet, a vertical condenser ensures that the solvent drips back down into the chamber which is automatically emptied at every cycle.

== History ==
William B. Jensen notes that the earliest example of a continuous extractor is archaeological evidence for a Mesopotamian hot-water extractor for organic matter dating from approximately 3500 BC. The same mechanism is present in the Pythagorean cup. Before Soxhlet, the French chemist Anselme Payen also pioneered with continuous extraction in the 1830s.

A Soxhlet apparatus has been proposed as an effective technique for washing mass standards.

== Gallery ==
Animation of Soxhlet extractor at work

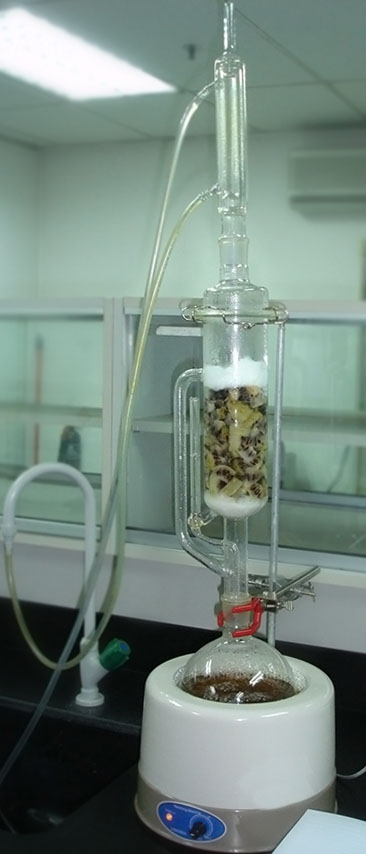
Fruit extraction in progress. The sample is placed directly in the extraction chamber, no thimble used.

The siphoning part of a Soxhlet extraction.
