= Carl Simonsen =

Danish lithographer and publisher

- Born: Carl Nicolaj Marius Simonsen; 30 November 1828
- Died: 5 December 1902 (aged 74); Copenhagen, Netherlands
- Occupations: Lithographer and publisher
- Spouse: Louise Oline Dihm
- Children: 1; Konrad Simonsen

Carl Nicolaj Marius Simonsen (30 November 1828 – 5 December 1902) was a Danish lithographer and publisher. He operated C. Simonsens Kunst- og Stentrykkeri from 1868 to 1898 and published the Danish magazine Punch from 1873 to 1895. His company was based at Gammel Strand 50 in Copenhagen. He was the father of the writer Konrad Simonsen.

== Early life ==
Simonsen was born in Copenhagen, the son of student Niels Simonsen and Caroline Hagemeister. He enrolled at the Royal Danish Academy of Fine Arts in 1841 where he won the small silver medal in March 1852. He later trained as a lithographer under Charles Lorilleux in Paris. He was represented on the Charlottenborg Spring Exhibition four times in the period 1848-1865.

== Career ==
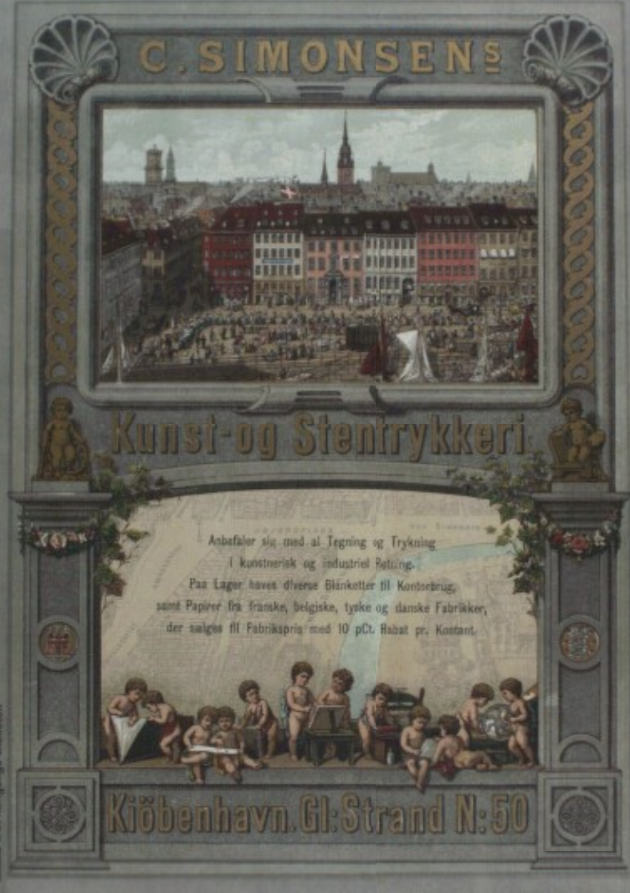
The building seen on an advertisement from C. Simonsens Kunst- og Stentrykkeri

Simonsen worked for Em. Bærentzen & Co. from 1856 to 1861. In 1868 he established C. Simonsen & P. Andersens Stentrykkeri together with a printmaker from his old employer after acquiring another printing business. The company changed its name to C. Simonsens Kunst- og Stentrykkeri when Andersen left it in 1870. He sold the company in 1898.

Simonsen created portraits of many historic as well as notable contemporary figures such as Carl Christian Hall, L.N. Hvidt, clockmaker Urban Jürgensen, the dancer Amalie Price, Frederikke Treschow, Johan Welhaven and Henrik Wergeland.

Simonsen was also the founder of the Danish version of the magazine Punch (1873–1895).

== Personal life ==
Simonsen was married to Louise Oline Dihm (1838–1909) and the father of the writer Konrad Simonsen (28 December 1876 – 1 December 1945).

He is buried in Solbjerg Park Cemetery.
