= Precipitate-free zone =

Region around a material grain boundary free of solid impurities

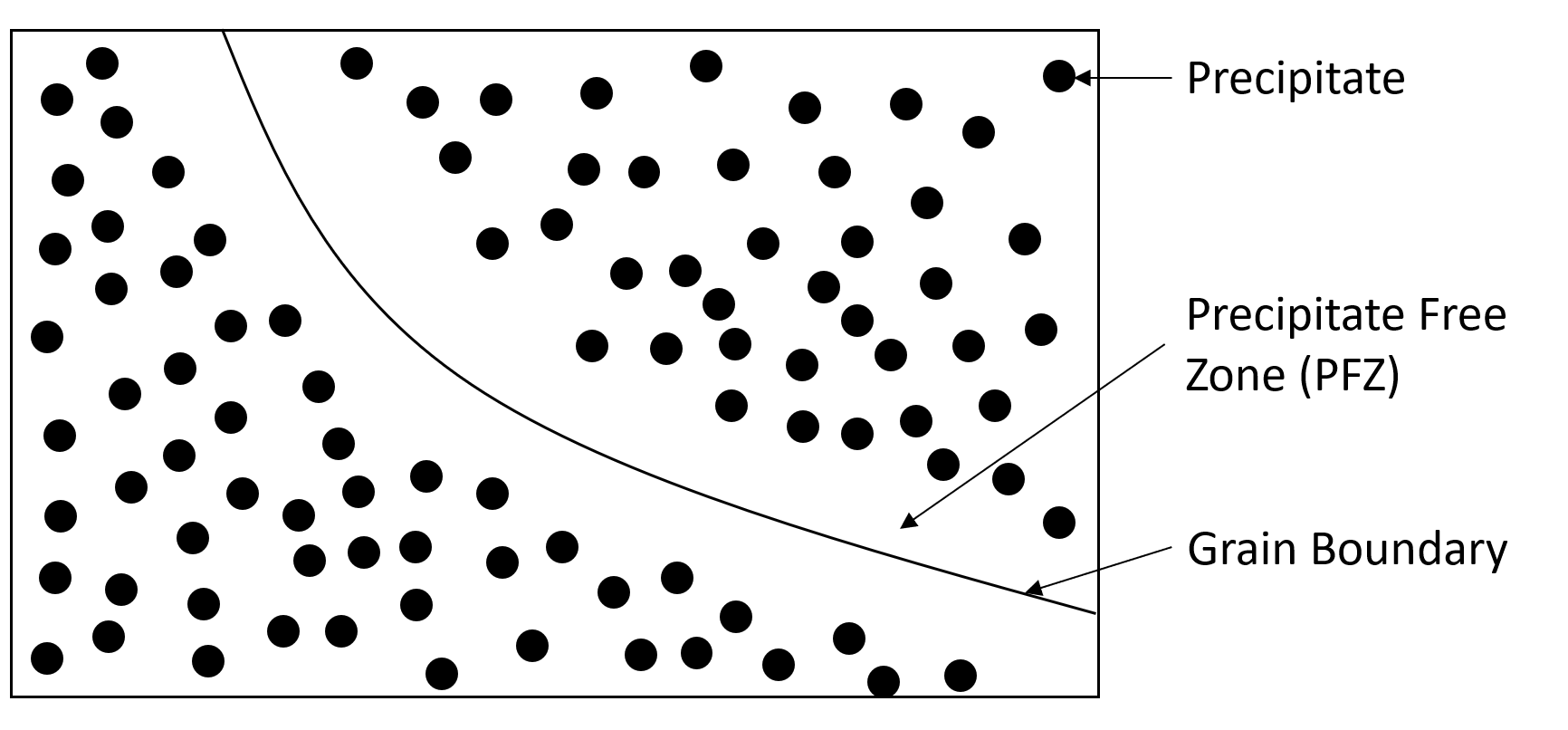
Schematic of a precipitate free zone (PFZ) immediately adjacent to a grain boundary in a polycrystalline material.

In materials science, a precipitate-free zone (PFZ) refers to microscopic localized regions around grain boundaries that are free of precipitates (solid impurities forced outwards from the grain during crystallization). It is a common phenomenon that arises in polycrystalline materials (crystalline materials with stochastically-oriented grains) where heterogeneous nucleation of precipitates is the dominant nucleation mechanism. This is because grain boundaries are high-energy surfaces that act as sinks for vacancies, causing regions adjacent to a grain boundary to be devoid of vacancies. As it is energetically favorable for heterogeneous nucleation to occur preferentially around defect-rich sites such as vacancies, nucleation of precipitates is impeded in the vacancy-free regions immediately adjacent to grain boundaries

== History ==
Pioneering studies on the theory and experimental observation of PFZs were made in the 1960s.

== Effect on material properties ==
PFZs are detrimental to the mechanical properties of materials. In particular, PFZs degrade the material's hardness, because the lack of precipitates in PFZs lead to these regions having fewer pinning sites. Dislocation motion – a condition necessary to cause a material to yield – will require an appreciably lower applied shear stress in PFZs, and consequently these locally weak zones will lead to plastic deformation. The width of PFZs have also been found to be negatively correlated with intergranular fracture

PFZs also accelerate pitting corrosion and stress corrosion cracking, significantly reducing the usable life of these materials in chemically aggressive environments.

== Techniques to minimize ==
It has been shown that PFZs can be minimized by quenching. First, quenching increases undercooling, favoring homogeneous nucleation in PFZs as it lowers the nucleation energy barrier even in the absence of potent nucleation sites. Additionally, low temperatures also lead to a reduction in diffusion rates, minimizing the loss of vacancies and premature growth of grain boundary precipitates. However, since diffusion rates at low temperatures are suppressed, the aging time (time taken for treatment to yield a desired grain size) would be long. Therefore, one processing technique to circumvent this is to increase the temperature slightly once a sufficient number of homogeneous nucleation sites have been formed. Another technique to minimize PFZs is to introduce impurity elements, as they strongly interact with vacancies and allow for a more even distribution of vacancies in the material. One example would be to introduce Mg in Al alloys

Cyclic strengthening (CS), a process wherein a material is mechanically pushed and pulled repeatedly at room temperature, creates fine precipitates that is homogeneously distributed throughout the microstructure. It has been suggested as an alternative to conventional, precipitate hardened alloys as this process achieves strengthening effects without introducing PFZs.
