= Walden reductor =

The Walden reductor is a reduction column filled with metallic silver which can be used to reduce a metal ion in aqueous solution to a lower oxidation state. It can be used e.g. to reduce UO_{2}^{2+} to U^{4+}. The method is named after George H. Walden, who developed it jointly with a Ph.D. student, Sylvan M. Edmonds, at Columbia University.

== Preparation and use ==
A copper wire is submerged in a solution of silver nitrate. Dendritic crystals of silver immediately form on the copper wire according to the following redox reaction:

Cu + 2 Ag^{+} → Cu^{2+} + 2 Ag

The silver crystals are then removed from the copper wire, washed with pure water to remove the copper nitrate and the excess of silver nitrate and packed in a small glass column.

To use the reductor, the solution to be reduced is poured at the top of the glass tube, and then drawn through it. The reactive front progresses along the column as in chromatography and the extent of reduction reaches up to 100 % as the solution passes down the tube and the product becomes completely separated from the starting material.

== Applications ==
The Walden reductor can be used to obtain chemical species in their low valence state if required for chemical analyses or to obtain small amounts of the compound in the appropriate form.

== See also ==
Other reductor

- Jones reductor

Other oxidizing reagents (opposite)

- Tollens' reagent
- Benedict's reagent
- Fehling's solution
