= Sivifene =

Chemical compound

Clinical data
- Other names: A-007; 4,4'-Dihydroxybenzophenone-2,4-dinitrophenylhydrazone
- Routes of administration: Topical

Identifiers
- IUPAC name: 4-[[2-(2,4-Dinitrophenyl)hydrazinyl]-(4-hydroxyphenyl)methylidene]cyclohexa-2,5-dien-1-one
- CAS Number: 2675-35-6
- PubChem CID: 5717660
- ChemSpider: 10632319
- UNII: XAV05295I5
- KEGG: D09380
- ChEMBL: ChEMBL307697
- CompTox Dashboard (EPA): DTXSID30949554

Chemical and physical data
- Formula: C_{19}H_{14}N_{4}O_{6}
- Molar mass: 394.343 g·mol^{−1}
- 3D model (JSmol): Interactive image
- SMILES: C1=CC(=O)C=CC1=C(C2=CC=C(C=C2)O)NNC3=C(C=C(C=C3)[N+](=O)[O-])[N+](=O)[O-]
- InChI: InChI=1S/C19H14N4O6/c24-15-6-1-12(2-7-15)19(13-3-8-16(25)9-4-13)21-20-17-10-5-14(22(26)27)11-18(17)23(28)29/h1-11,20-21,24H; Key:JOADKLYQCOMENH-UHFFFAOYSA-N

Sivifene (INN, USAN; developmental code name A-007) is a small-molecule antineoplastic agent and immunomodulator that was under development in the 2000s by Tigris Pharmaceuticals (now Kirax Corporation) as a topical treatment for cutaneous cancer metastases. It was specifically being investigated to treat high-grade squamous intraepithelial lesions (HSIL) associated with human papillomavirus (HPV) infection and invasive carcinomas of the anogenital area such as cervical, vaginal, and anal cancers. The drug reached phase II clinical trials prior to its discontinuation.

Initially, due to its structural similarity to tamoxifen, sivifene was thought to be a selective estrogen receptor modulator (SERM), but subsequent research revealed that it does not bind to the estrogen receptor (ER) and does not possess antiestrogenic activity. The actual mechanism of action of sivifene is unknown, but it is thought to produce its immunomodulating effects via upregulation of the CD45 T-lymphocyte cell surface receptor.

== See also ==
- Tesmilifene
