= Tollens' reagent =

Chemical reagent used to distinguish between aldehydes and ketones

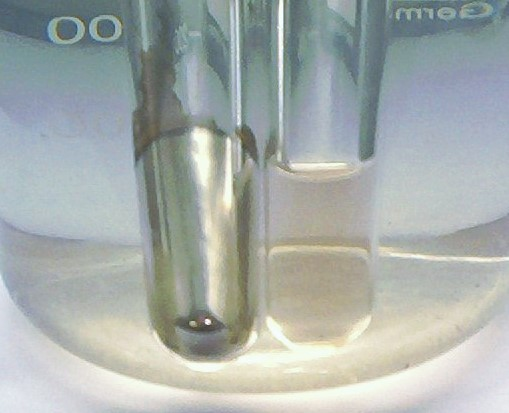
Tollens' test for aldehyde: left side positive (silver mirror), right side negative

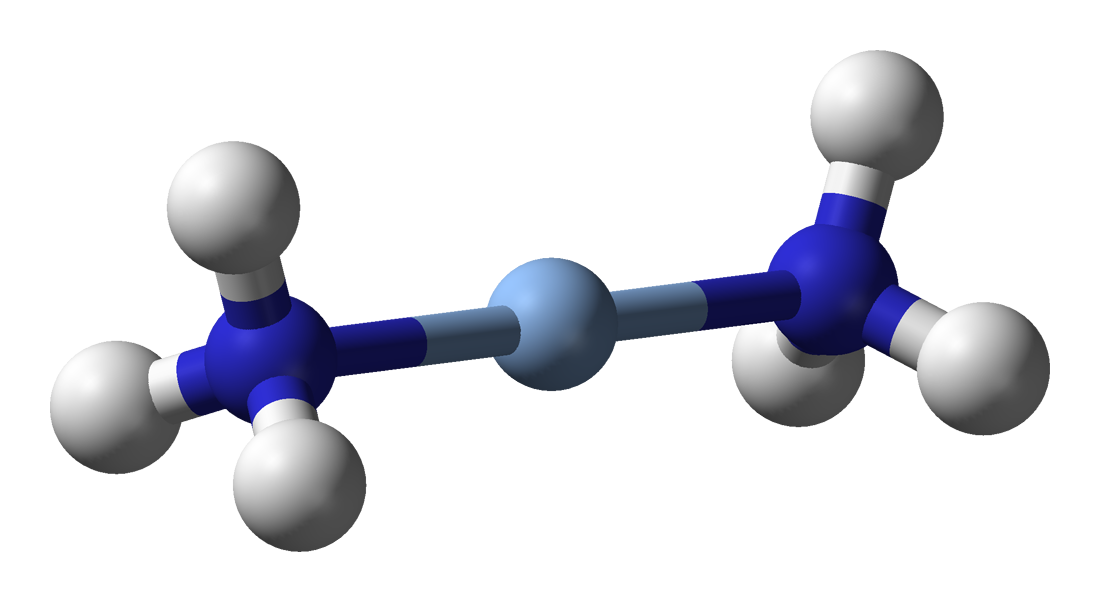
Ball-and-stick model of the diamminesilver(I) complex

Tollens' reagent (chemical formula Ag(NH_{3})_{2}OH) is a chemical reagent used to distinguish between aldehydes and ketones along with some alpha-hydroxy ketones which can tautomerize into aldehydes. The reagent consists of a solution of silver nitrate, ammonium hydroxide and some sodium hydroxide (to maintain a basic pH of the reagent solution). It was named after its discoverer, the German chemist Bernhard Tollens. A positive test with Tollens' reagent is indicated by the precipitation of elemental silver, often producing a characteristic "silver mirror" on the inner surface of the reaction vessel.

== Laboratory preparation ==
This reagent is not commercially available due to its short shelf life, so it must be freshly prepared in the laboratory. One common preparation involves two steps. First a few drops of dilute sodium hydroxide are added to some aqueous 0.1 M silver nitrate. The OH^{−} ions convert the silver aquo complex form into silver(I) oxide, Ag_{2}O, which precipitates from the solution as a brown solid:

2 AgNO_{3} + 2 NaOH → Ag_{2}O

In the next step, sufficient aqueous ammonia is added to dissolve the brown silver(I) oxide. The resulting solution contains the [Ag(NH_{3})_{2}]^{+} complexes in the mixture, which is the main component of Tollens' reagent. Sodium hydroxide is reformed:

Ag_{2}O + 4 NH_{3} + 2 NaNO_{3} + H_{2}O → 2 [Ag(NH_{3})_{2}]NO_{3} + 2 NaOH

Alternatively, aqueous ammonia can be added directly to silver nitrate solution. At first, ammonia will induce formation of solid silver oxide, but with additional ammonia, this solid precipitate dissolves to give a clear solution of diamminesilver(I) coordination complex, [Ag(NH_{3})_{2}]^{+}. Filtering the reagent before use helps to prevent false-positive results.

== Uses ==
=== Qualitative organic analysis ===
Once the presence of a carbonyl group has been identified using 2,4-dinitrophenylhydrazine (also known as Brady's reagent or 2,4-DNPH or 2,4-DNP), Tollens' reagent can be used to distinguish ketone vs aldehyde. Tollens' reagent gives a negative test for most ketones, with alpha-hydroxy ketones being one exception.

The test rests on the premise that aldehydes are more readily oxidized compared with ketones; this is due to the carbonyl-containing carbon in aldehydes having attached hydrogen. The diamminesilver(I) complex in the mixture is an oxidizing agent and is the essential reactant in Tollens' reagent. The test is generally carried out in a test tube in a warm water bath.

In a positive test, the diamminesilver(I) complex oxidizes the aldehyde to a carboxylate ion and in the process is reduced to elemental silver and aqueous ammonia. The elemental silver precipitates out of solution, occasionally onto the inner surface of the reaction vessel, giving a characteristic "silver mirror". The carboxylate ion on acidification will give its corresponding carboxylic acid. The carboxylic acid is not directly formed in the first place as the reaction takes place under alkaline conditions. The ionic equations for the overall reaction are shown below; R refers to an alkyl group.

2 [Ag(NH_{3})_{2}]^{+} + RCHO + H_{2}O → 2 Ag + 4 NH_{3} + RCOOH + 2 H^{+}

Tollens' reagent can also be used to test for terminal alkynes (RC_{2}H). A white precipitate of the acetylide (AgC_{2}R) is formed in this case. Another test relies on reaction of the furfural with phloroglucinol to produce a colored compound with high molar absorptivity. It also gives a positive test with hydrazines, hydrazones, α-hydroxy ketones and 1,2-dicarbonyls.

Both Tollens' reagent and Fehling's reagent give positive results with formic acid.

=== Staining ===
In anatomic pathology, ammonical silver nitrate is used in the Fontana–Masson stain, which is a silver stain technique used to detect melanin, argentaffin, and lipofuscin in tissue sections. Melanin and the other chromaffins reduce the silver nitrate to metallic silver.

=== In silver mirroring ===
Tollens' reagent is also used to apply a silver mirror to glassware; for example the inside of an insulated vacuum flask. The underlying chemical process is called silver mirror reaction. The reducing agent is glucose (an aldehyde) for such applications. Clean glassware is required for a high quality mirror. To increase the speed of deposition, the glass surface may be pre-treated with tin(II) chloride stabilised in hydrochloric acid solution.

For applications requiring the highest optical quality, such as in telescope mirrors, the use of tin(II) chloride is problematic, since it creates nanoscale roughness and reduces the reflectivity. Methods to produce telescope mirrors include additional additives to increase adhesion and film resilience, such as in Martin's method, which includes tartaric acid and ethanol.

== Safety ==
Aged reagent can be destroyed with dilute acid to prevent the formation of the highly explosive silver nitride.

== See also ==
- Benedict's reagent
- Walden reductor (opposite use involving metallic silver)
