= Precipitation (chemistry) =

Chemical process leading to the settling of an insoluble solid from a solution

Principle of chemical precipitation in aqueous solution

In an aqueous solution, precipitation is the "sedimentation of a solid material (a precipitate) from a liquid solution". The solid formed is called the precipitate. In case of an inorganic chemical reaction leading to precipitation, the chemical reagent causing the solid to form is called the precipitant.

The liquid remaining above the precipitated or the centrifuged solid phase is also called the supernate or supernatant.

== Concepts and complications ==
Compounds precipitate from a solution when its concentration exceeds its solubility, i.e. the solution is supersaturated. Supersaturation can arise from temperature changes, solvent evaporation, or by mixing solvents. Precipitation occurs more rapidly from a strongly supersaturated solution.

=== Colloidal suspensions ===
Without sufficient attraction forces (e.g., Van der Waals force) to aggregate the solid particles together and to remove them from solution by gravity (settling), they remain in suspension and form colloids. Sedimentation can be accelerated by high speed centrifugation. The compact mass thus obtained is sometimes referred to as a 'pellet'.

=== Digestion and ageing ===
Digestion, or precipitate ageing, happens when a freshly formed precipitate is left, usually at a higher temperature, in the solution from which it precipitates. It results in purer and larger recrystallized particles. Ostwald ripening is the physico-chemical process underlying digestion.

== Applications ==
=== Analytical chemistry ===
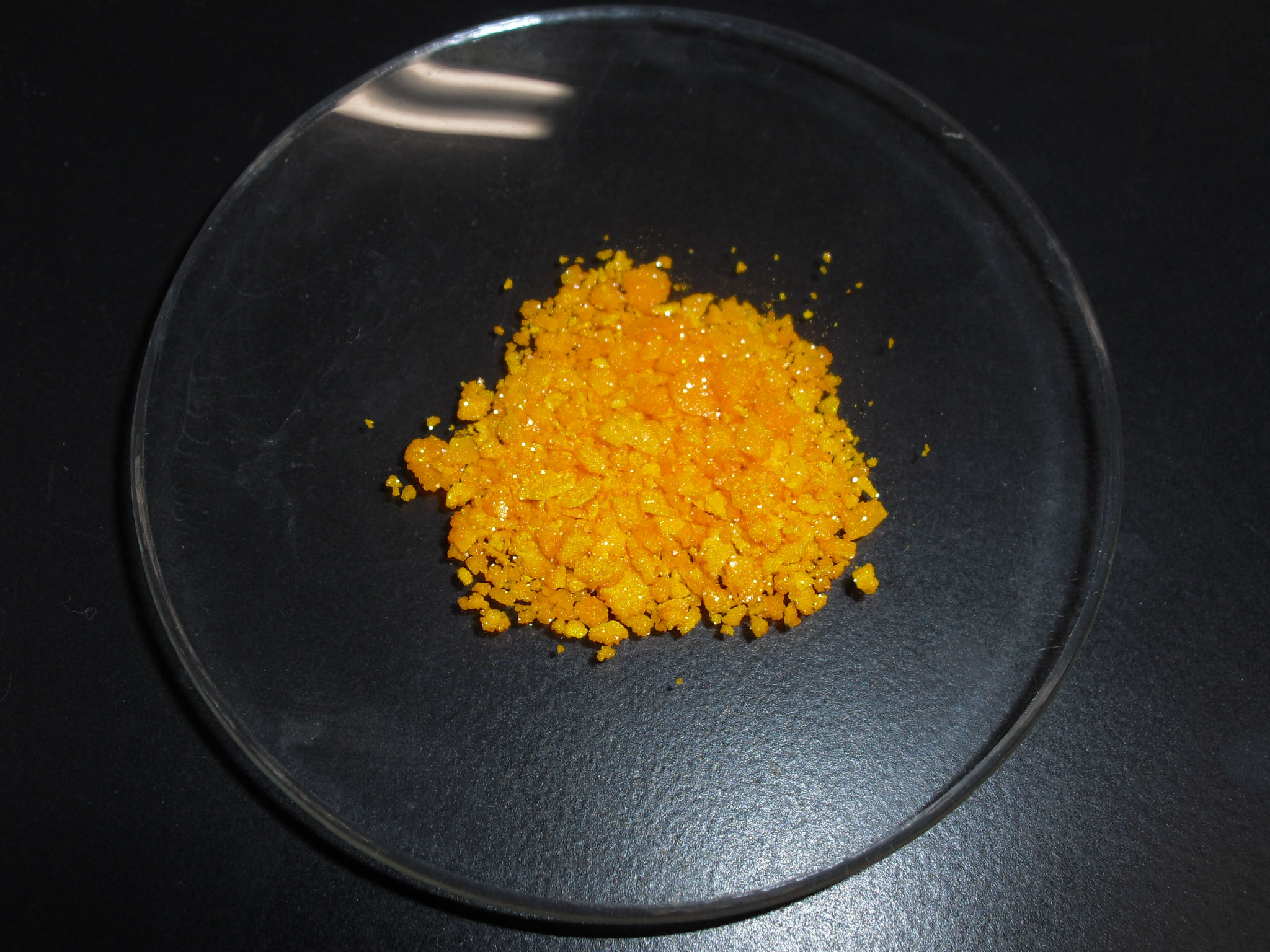
Potassium hexachloroplatinate, the result of gravimetric analysis for potassium

Precipitate formation is a core step in gravimetric analysis, which is used to identify and quantify ions. A common example of precipitation from aqueous solution is that of silver chloride. When silver nitrate (AgNO_{3}) is added to a solution of potassium chloride (KCl) the precipitation of a white solid (AgCl) is observed.

AgNO_{3} + KCl → AgCl↓ + KNO_{3}

The ionic equation allows to write this reaction by detailing the dissociated ions present in aqueous solution.

Ag^{+} + NO^{−}_{3} + K^{+} + Cl^{−} → AgCl↓ + K^{+} + NO^{−}_{3}

Potassium is quantified using hexachloroplatinic acid as the precipitating agent. Treatment of a solution containing K^{+} ions with an excess of this platinic acid quantitatively affords of potassium hexachloroplatinate, which is easily weighed and is non-hygroscopic:

2 K^{+} + H_{2}[PtCl_{6}] → K_{2}[PtCl_{6}] + 2 H^{+}

Homogeneous precipitation involves formation of the precipitate from a single homogeneous solution, as in the case of barium sulfate. A sample solution containing barium ions is treated with an excess of sulfamic acid. This solution is heated to induce hydrolysis of sulfamic acid to bisulfate:

2 H_{2}NSO_{3}H + 2 H_{2}O → 2 NH^{+}_{4} + 2 HSO^{−}_{4}

The bisulfate readily reacts with barium ions to give the sulfate:

2 HSO^{−}_{4} + Ba^{2+} → BaSO_{4} + 2 H^{+}

=== Inorganic chemistry ===
Hydroxide precipitation is probably the most widely used industrial precipitation process in which metal hydroxides are formed by adding calcium hydroxide (slaked lime) or sodium hydroxide (caustic soda) as precipitant.

=== Radiowaste cleanup ===
Precipitation is one strategy for the separation of dangerous radionuclides from radioactive wastes. One particular area of interest is the removal of ^{137}Cs.

=== Biochemistry ===
Proteins purification and separation can be performed by precipitation in changing the nature of the solvent or the value of its relative permittivity (e.g., by replacing water by ethanol), or by increasing the ionic strength of the solution. As proteins have complex tertiary and quaternary structures due to their specific folding and various weak intermolecular interactions (e.g., hydrogen bridges), these superstructures can be modified and proteins denaturated and precipitated. Another important application of an antisolvent is in ethanol precipitation of DNA.

=== Metallurgy and alloys ===
In solid phases, precipitation occurs if the concentration of one solid is above the solubility limit in the host solid, due to e.g. rapid quenching or ion implantation, and the temperature is high enough that diffusion can lead to segregation into precipitates. Precipitation in solids is routinely used to synthesize nanoclusters.

In metallurgy, precipitation from a solid solution is also a way to strengthen alloys.

Precipitation of ceramic phases in metallic alloys such as zirconium hydrides in zircaloy cladding of nuclear fuel pins can also render metallic alloys brittle and lead to their mechanical failure. Correctly mastering the precise temperature and pressure conditions when cooling down spent nuclear fuels is therefore essential to avoid damaging their cladding and to preserve the integrity of the spent fuel elements on the long term in dry storage casks and in geological disposal conditions.

== History ==
Powders derived from different precipitation processes have also historically been known as 'flowers'.

== Related phenomena ==
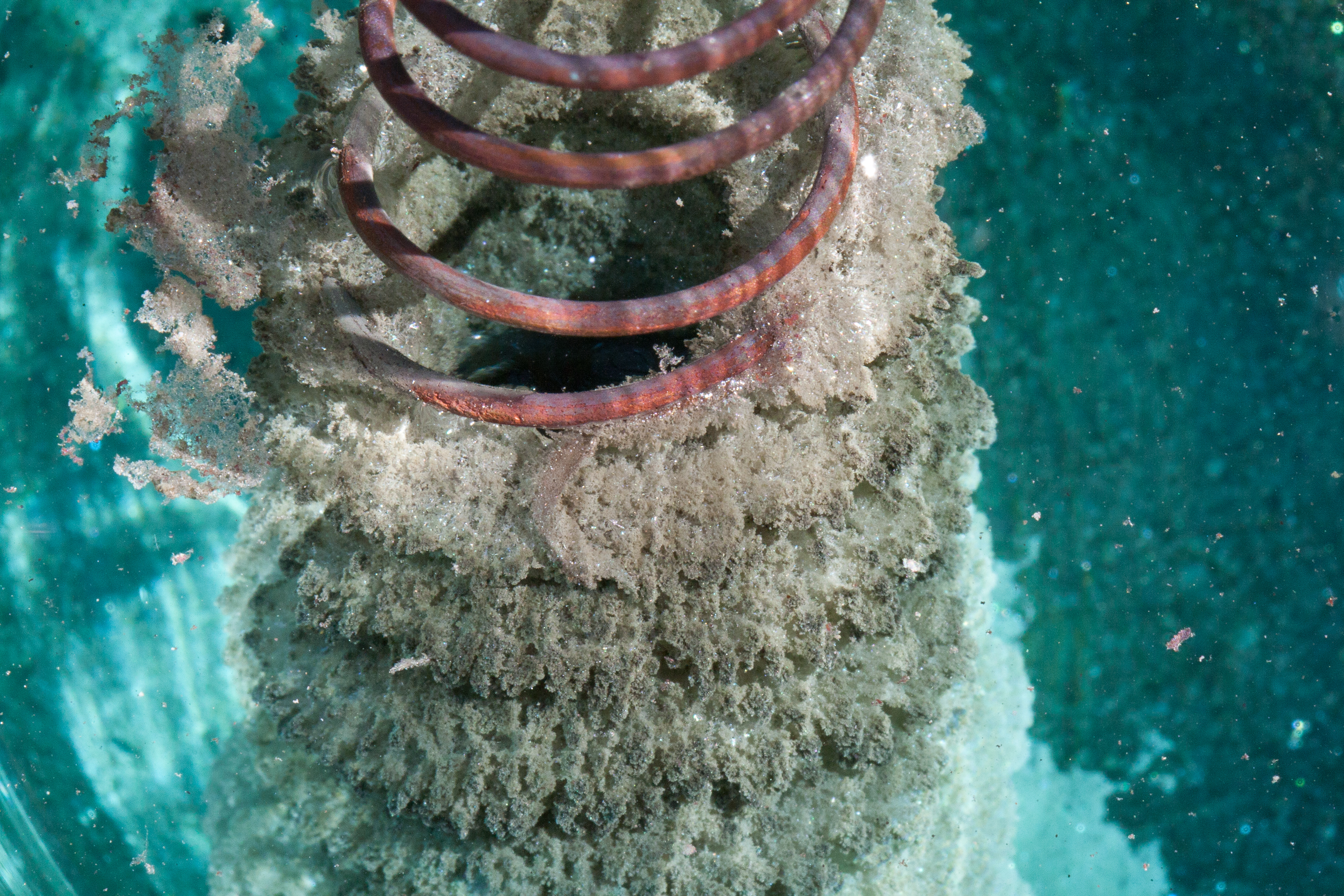
Illustration of the Walden reductor. Copper from a wire is displaced by silver from a silver nitrate solution it is dipped into, and metallic silver crystals precipitate onto the copper wire.

Electroplating is a kind of precipitation whereby a metal is deposited on a surface. The precipitating agent is a reducing agent. The preparation of a Walden reductor illustrative. It is made of tiny silver crystals obtained by the immersion of a copper wire into a solution of silver nitrate:

Cu + 2 Ag^{+} → Cu^{2+} + 2 Ag

== See also ==
- Coprecipitation
- Effervescence, the "up-arrow"
- Precipitate-free zone
- Salting in
- Salting out
