= 3,5-Dinitrosalicylic acid =

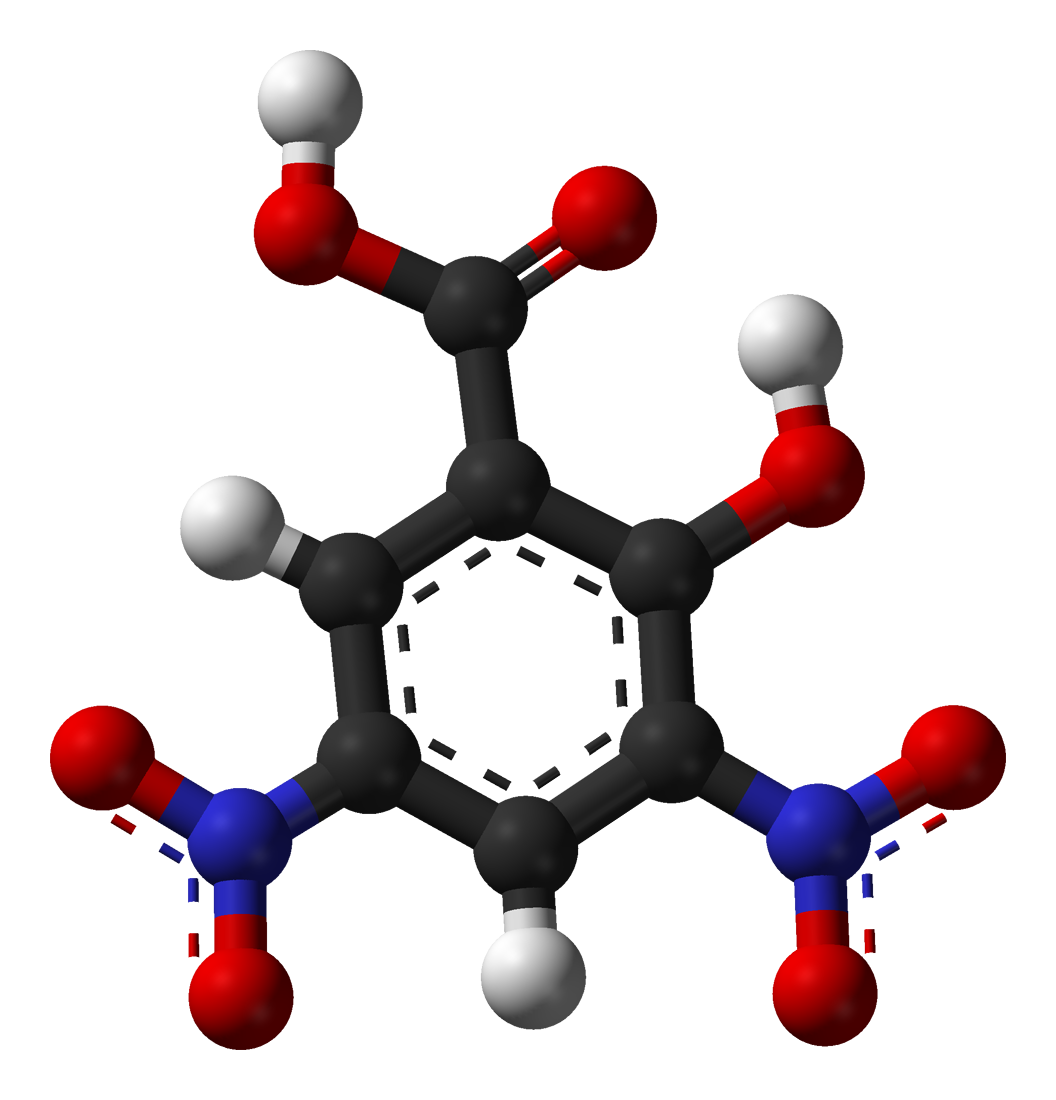

Names
- Preferred IUPAC name 2-Hydroxy-3,5-dinitrobenzoic acid
- Other names 3,5-Dinitrosalicylic acid

Identifiers
CAS Number	609-99-4
3D model (JSmol)	Interactive image
Beilstein Reference	2220661
ChEBI	CHEBI:53648
ChEMBL	ChEMBL2260697
ChemSpider	11380
ECHA InfoCard	100.009.278
EC Number	210-204-3
Gmelin Reference	5309
KEGG	C11319
PubChem CID	11873
UNII	2ACT5NW8HU
CompTox Dashboard (EPA)	DTXSID9060576
- InChI: InChI=1S/C7H4N2O7/c10-6-4(7(11)12)1-3(8(13)14)2-5(6)9(15)16/h1-2,10H,(H,11,12) Key: LWFUFLREGJMOIZ-UHFFFAOYSA-N; InChI=1/C7H4N2O7/c10-6-4(7(11)12)1-3(8(13)14)2-5(6)9(15)16/h1-2,10H,(H,11,12) Key: LWFUFLREGJMOIZ-UHFFFAOYAQ
- SMILES: c1c(cc(c(c1C(=O)O)O)[N+](=O)[O-])[N+](=O)[O-]

Properties
Chemical formula	C_{7}H_{4}N_{2}O_{7}
Molar mass	228.116 g·mol^{−1}
Appearance	Yellow needles or plates
Density	1.70 g/cm^{3}
Melting point	182 °C (360 °F; 455 K) (decomposes at 275 °C (527 °F; 548 K))
Solubility in water	2 g/100mL (20 °C (68 °F; 293 K))
Solubility in organic solvents	Soluble in ethanol, diethyl ether, benzene
log P	1.71

Hazards
- GHS labelling
Pictograms	(GHS05: Corrosive) (GHS07: Exclamation mark)
Signal word	Danger
Hazard statements	H302, H318
Precautionary statements	P264, P270, P280, P301+P312+P330, P305+P351+P338+P310, P501
NFPA 704 (fire diamond)	2 1 0
- Lethal dose or concentration (LD, LC)
LD_{50} (median dose)	860 mg/kg (Oral, rat)
- Except where otherwise noted, data are given for materials in their standard state (at 25 °C [77 °F], 100 kPa). verify (what is ?) Infobox references

3,5-Dinitrosalicylic acid (DNS or DNSA, IUPAC name 2-hydroxy-3,5-dinitrobenzoic acid) is an aromatic compound that reacts with reducing sugars and other reducing molecules to form 3-amino-5-nitrosalicylic acid, which strongly absorbs light at 540 nm.

== Synthesis ==
3,5-Dinitrosalicylic acid can be prepared by the nitration of salicylic acid:

== Uses ==
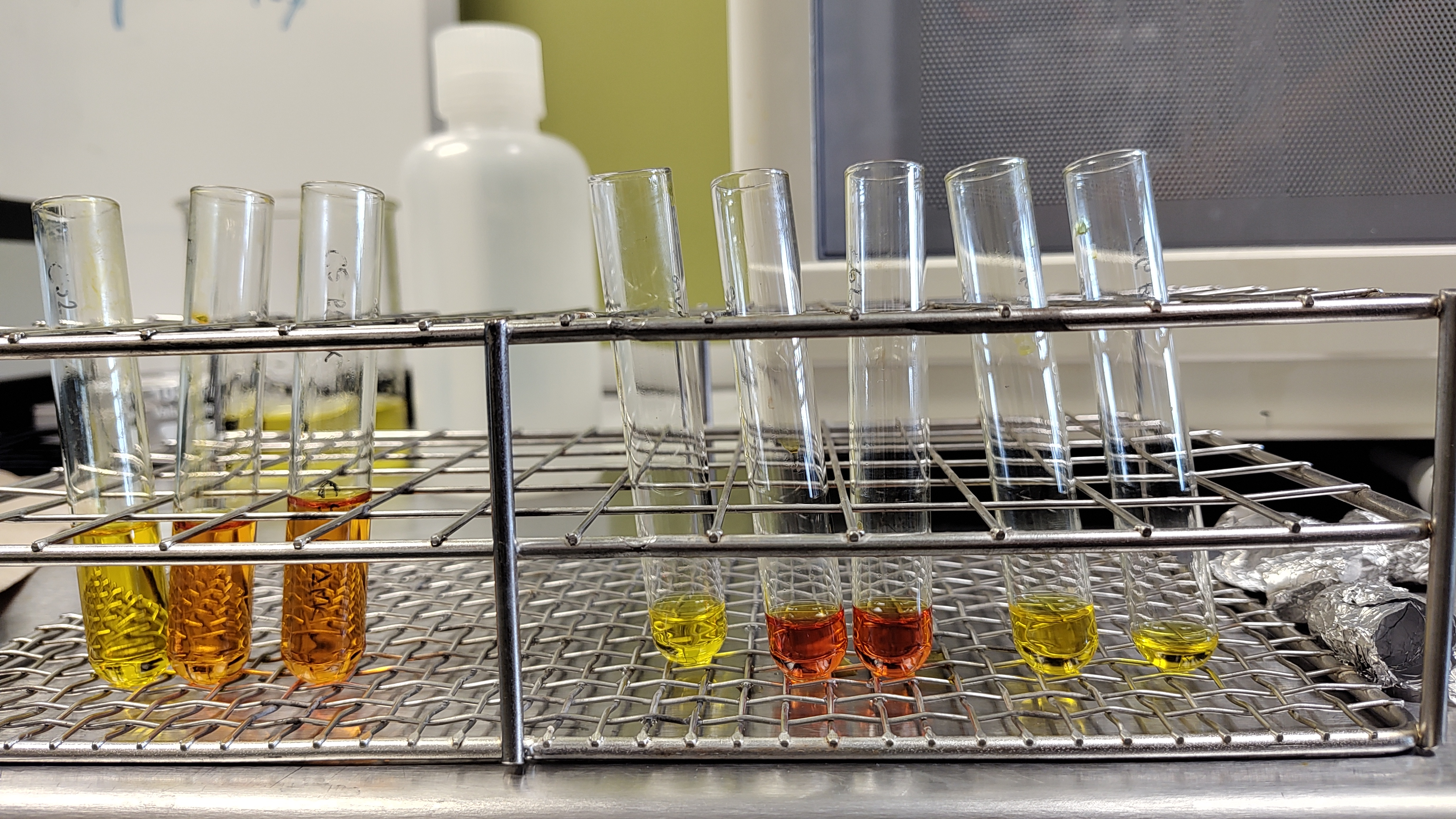
DNS method measurements.

It was first introduced as a method to detect reducing substances in urine by James B. Sumner. It has since been widely used (for example) for quantifying carbohydrate levels in blood. It is mainly used in assay of alpha-amylase, however enzymatic methods are usually preferred due to DNS's lack of specificity.

== Safety ==
Although specific sensitivity information is not given, Sigma-Aldrich lists the storage class of the free acid as "other explosive materials".

Various metal salts of DNS are explosives of varying sensitivity. The copper salt explodes on rapid heating, while the lead salt is a primary explosive as impact sensitive as mercury fulminate. The barium salt is friction sensitive and both it and the dipotassium salts are impact sensitive (though not extremely so).
