= Fehling's solution =

Chemical test for the reducibility of a sugar

Fehling's test
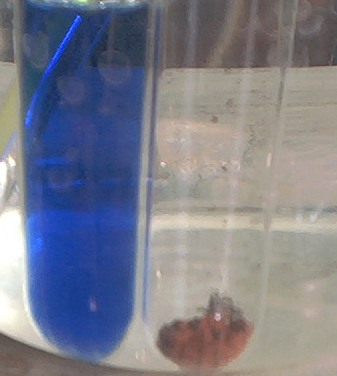
- On the left, the solution in the absence of reducing sugars. On the right, copper oxide, which would appear in the bottom of the solution if reducing sugars are present.
- Classification: Colorimetric method
- Analytes: Monosaccharides

In organic chemistry, Fehling's solution (/'feɪlɪŋ/, FAY-ling) is a chemical reagent used to differentiate between water-soluble carbohydrate and ketone (>C=O) functional groups, and as a test for reducing sugars and non-reducing sugars, supplementary to the Tollens' reagent test. The test was developed by German chemist Hermann von Fehling in 1849.

== Laboratory preparation ==
Fehling's solution is prepared by combining two separate solutions: Fehling's A, which is a deep blue aqueous solution of copper(II) sulfate, and Fehling's B, which is a colorless solution of aqueous potassium sodium tartrate (also known as Rochelle salt) made strongly alkaline with sodium hydroxide. These two solutions, stable separately, are combined when needed for the test because the copper(II) complex formed by their combination is not stable: it slowly decomposes into copper hydroxide in the alkaline conditions. The active reagent is a tartrate complex of Cu^{2+}, which serves as an oxidizing agent. The tartrate serves as a ligand. However, the coordination chemistry is complex and various species with different metal to ligand ratio have been determined.

Other methods of preparing comparable cupric-ion test-reagent solutions were developed at about the same time as Fehling's. These include the Viollette solution (eponymous for Charles Cléophile Viollette (1823–1894)) and the Soxhlet solution (eponymous for Franz Ritter von Soxhlet (1848–1926)), both containing tartrate, and Soldaïni's solution (eponymous for Arturo Soldaïni), which instead contains carbonate. Barfoed's test is also related and similar to Fehling's test (eponymous for Christen Thomsen Barfoed (1815–1889)).

== Use of the reagent ==
Fehling's solution can be used to distinguish aldehyde vs ketone functional groups. The compound to be tested is added to the Fehling's solution and the mixture is heated. Aldehydes are oxidized, giving a positive result, but ketones do not react, unless they are α-hydroxy ketones. The bistartratocuprate(II) complex oxidizes the aldehyde to a carboxylate anion, and in the process the copper(II) ions of the complex are reduced to copper(I) ions. Red copper(I) oxide then precipitates out of the reaction mixture, which indicates a positive result i.e. that redox has taken place (this is the same positive result as with Benedict's solution).

Fehling's test can be used as a generic test for monosaccharides and other reducing sugars (e.g., maltose). It will give a positive result for aldose monosaccharides (due to the oxidisable aldehyde group) but also for ketose monosaccharides, as they are converted to aldoses by the base in the reagent, and then give a positive result.

Fehling's can be used to screen for glucose in urine, thus detecting diabetes. Another use is in the breakdown of starch to convert it to glucose syrup and maltodextrins in order to measure the amount of reducing sugar, thus revealing the dextrose equivalent (DE) of the starch sugar.

Formic acid (HCO_{2}H) also gives a positive Fehling's test result, as it does with Tollens' (eponymous for Bernhard Christian Gottfried Tollens (1841 – 1918)) test and Benedict's solution also. The positive tests are consistent with it being readily oxidizable to carbon dioxide.

The solution cannot differentiate between benzaldehyde and acetone.

== Net reaction ==
The net reaction between an aldehyde and the copper(II) ions in Fehling's solution may be written as:

$$\ce{RCHO + 2 Cu^2+ + 5 OH- -> RCOO- + Cu2O + 3 H2O}$$

or with the tartrate included:

$$\ce{RCHO + 2 Cu(C4H4O6)2^2- + 5 OH- -> RCOO- + Cu2O + 4 C4H4O6^2- + 3 H2O}$$

== See also ==
- Barfoed's test
