= Jones reductor =

Reducing agent

A Jones reductor is a device used to reduce aqueous solutions of metal ions. The active component is a zinc amalgam. Jones reductors have been used for preparing solutions of titanium(III), vanadium(II), chromium(II), molybdenum(III), niobium(III), europium(II), and uranium(III).

== Preparation and use ==
Amalgamated zinc is prepared by treating zinc metal with a 2% solution of mercury(II) chloride. The metal may be in the granulated form or as shavings, wool, or powder. The amalgam forms on the surface of the zinc. After washing to remove salts, the amalgam is placed in a long glass tube, similar to a chromatography column, equipped with a stopcock. The amalgam is a more effective reducing agent than zinc metal. The effluent is often air-sensitive, requiring the use of air-free techniques.

To use the reductor, the solution to be reduced is drawn through the tube. If the column is loosely packed, the solution may pass through without assistance. The length of the column or the flow rate are adjusted to effect full reduction of the soluble reagent. The effluent is also contaminated with zinc(II) salts, but they do not affect subsequent operations. These operations might include iodometric titration to determine the reducible content of the effluent. In some cases, the effluent is treated with other reagents to precipitate a compound of the reduced ions.

== See also ==
- Walden reductor
