= 3-Amino-5-nitrosalicylic acid =

- 3-Amino-5-nitrosalicylic acid

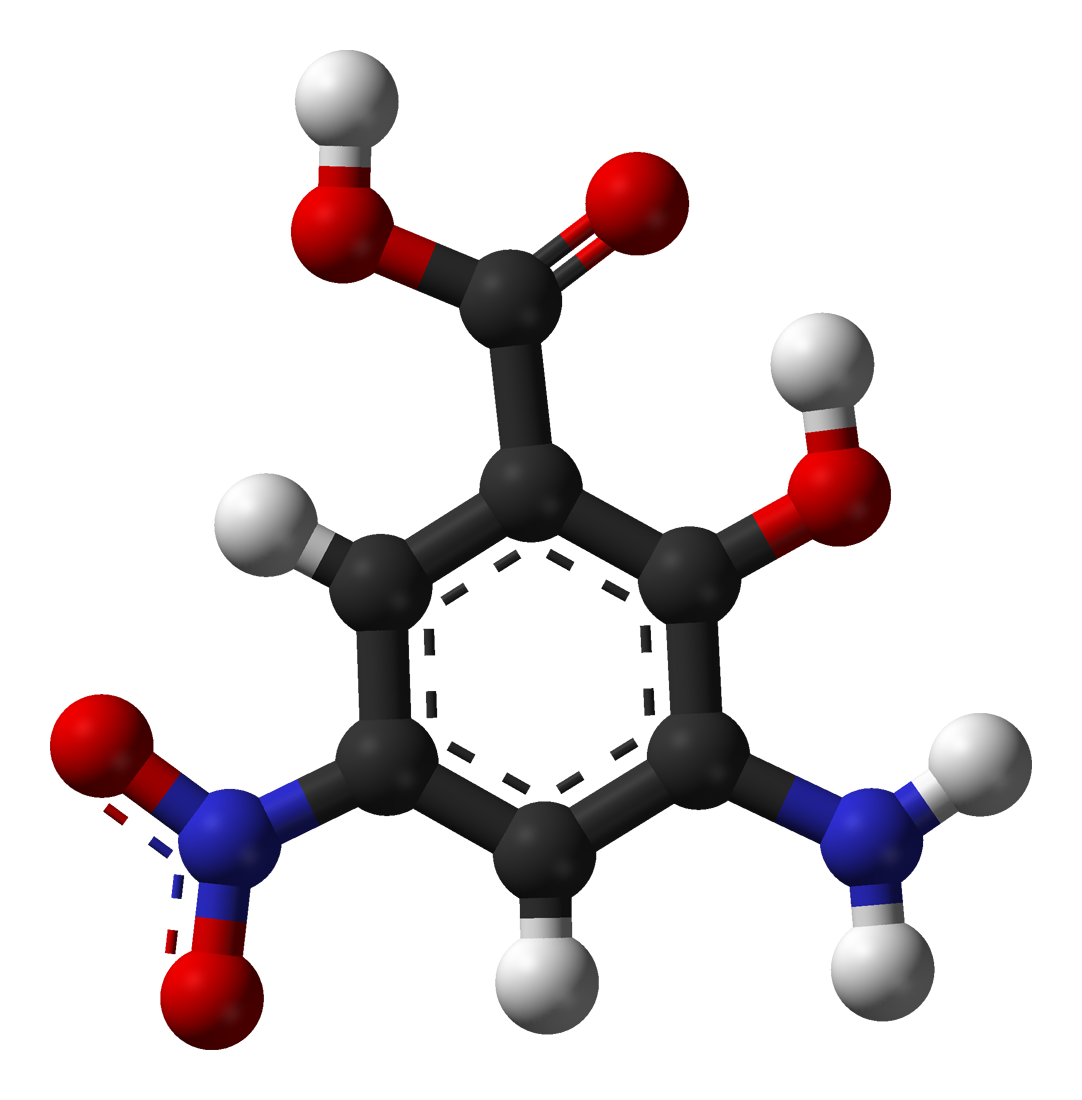
- Ball-and-stick model of 3-amino-5-nitrosalicylic acid

Names
- Preferred IUPAC name 3-Amino-2-hydroxy-5-nitrobenzoic acid

Identifiers
CAS Number	831-51-6
3D model (JSmol)	Interactive image
ChemSpider	4271595
ECHA InfoCard	100.011.457
EC Number	212-602-2
PubChem CID	5095842
UNII	VYP8KK669F
CompTox Dashboard (EPA)	DTXSID20232169
- InChI: InChI=1S/C7H6N2O5/c8-5-2-3(9(13)14)1-4(6(5)10)7(11)12/h1-2,10H,8H2,(H,11,12) Key: JFTUSFFYSRNFBA-UHFFFAOYSA-N; InChI=1/C7H6N2O5/c8-5-2-3(9(13)14)1-4(6(5)10)7(11)12/h1-2,10H,8H2,(H,11,12) Key: JFTUSFFYSRNFBA-UHFFFAOYAS
- SMILES: [O-][N+](=O)c1cc(C(=O)O)c(O)c(N)c1

Properties
Chemical formula	C_{7}H_{6}N_{2}O_{5}
Molar mass	198.13294 g/mol
Density	1.730 ± 0.06 g/cm^{3}
- Except where otherwise noted, data are given for materials in their standard state (at 25 °C [77 °F], 100 kPa). verify (what is ?) Infobox references

3-Amino-5-nitrosalicylic acid is an aromatic compound that absorbs light strongly at 540 nm. It is produced when 3,5-dinitrosalicylic acid reacts with a reducing sugar. In this reaction, the 3-nitro group (NOO^{−}) is reduced to an amino group (NH_{2}).
