= Reducing sugar =

Sugars that contain free OH group at the anomeric carbon atom

Reducing form of glucose (the aldehyde group is on the far right)

A reducing sugar is any sugar that is capable of acting as a reducing agent. In an alkaline solution, a reducing sugar forms some aldehyde or ketone, which allows it to act as a reducing agent, for example in Benedict's reagent. In such a reaction, the sugar becomes a carboxylic acid.

All monosaccharides are reducing sugars, along with some disaccharides, some oligosaccharides, and some polysaccharides. The monosaccharides can be divided into two groups: the aldoses, which have an aldehyde group, and the ketoses, which have a ketone group. Ketoses must first tautomerize to aldoses before they can act as reducing sugars. The common dietary monosaccharides galactose, glucose and fructose are all reducing sugars.

Disaccharides are formed from two monosaccharides and can be classified as either reducing or nonreducing. Nonreducing disaccharides like sucrose and trehalose have glycosidic bonds between their anomeric carbons and thus cannot convert to an open-chain form with an aldehyde group; they are stuck in the cyclic form. Reducing disaccharides like lactose and maltose have only one of their two anomeric carbons involved in the glycosidic bond, while the other is free and can convert to an open-chain form with an aldehyde group.

The aldehyde functional group allows the sugar to act as a reducing agent, for example, in the Tollens' test or Benedict's test. The cyclic hemiacetal forms of aldoses can open to reveal an aldehyde, and certain ketoses can undergo tautomerization to become aldoses. However, acetals, including those found in polysaccharide linkages, cannot easily become free aldehydes.

Reducing sugars react with amino acids in the Maillard reaction, a series of reactions that occurs while cooking food at high temperatures and that is important in determining the flavor of food. Also, the levels of reducing sugars in wine, juice, and sugarcane are indicative of the quality of these food products.

== Terminology ==
=== Oxidation-reduction ===
A reducing sugar is one that reduces another compound and is itself oxidized; that is, the carbonyl carbon of the sugar is oxidized to a carboxyl group.

A sugar is classified as a reducing sugar only if it has an open-chain form with an aldehyde group or a free hemiacetal group.

=== Aldoses and ketoses ===
Monosaccharides which contain an aldehyde group are known as aldoses, and those with a ketone group are known as ketoses. The aldehyde can be oxidized via a redox reaction in which another compound is reduced. Thus, aldoses are reducing sugars. Sugars with ketone groups in their open chain form are capable of isomerizing via a series of tautomeric shifts to produce an aldehyde group in solution. Therefore, ketones like fructose are considered reducing sugars but it is the isomer containing an aldehyde group which is reducing since ketones cannot be oxidized without decomposition of the sugar backbone. This type of isomerization is catalyzed by the base present in solutions which test for the presence of reducing sugars.

=== Reducing end ===
Disaccharides consist of two monosaccharides and may be either reducing or nonreducing. Even a reducing disaccharide will only have one reducing end, as disaccharides are held together by glycosidic bonds, which consist of at least one anomeric carbon. With one anomeric carbon unable to convert to the open-chain form, only the free anomeric carbon is available to reduce another compound, and it is called the reducing end of the disaccharide. A nonreducing disaccharide is that which has both anomeric carbons tied up in the glycosidic bond.

Similarly, most polysaccharides have only one reducing end.

== Examples ==
All monosaccharides are reducing sugars because they either have an aldehyde group (if they are aldoses) or can tautomerize in solution to form an aldehyde group (if they are ketoses). This includes common monosaccharides like galactose, glucose, glyceraldehyde, fructose, ribose, and xylose.

Many disaccharides, like cellobiose, lactose, and maltose, also have a reducing form, as one of the two units may have an open-chain form with an aldehyde group. However, sucrose and trehalose, in which the anomeric carbon atoms of the two units are linked together, are nonreducing disaccharides since neither of the rings is capable of opening.

Equilibrium between cyclic and open-chain form in one ring of maltose

In glucose polymers such as starch and starch-derivatives like glucose syrup, maltodextrin and dextrin the macromolecule begins with a reducing sugar, a free aldehyde. When starch has been partially hydrolyzed the chains have been split and hence it contains more reducing sugars per gram. The percentage of reducing sugars present in these starch derivatives is called dextrose equivalent (DE).

Glycogen is a highly branched polymer of glucose that serves as the main form of carbohydrate storage in animals. It is a reducing sugar with only one reducing end, no matter how large the glycogen molecule is or how many branches it has (note, however, that the unique reducing end is usually covalently linked to glycogenin and will therefore not be reducing). Each branch ends in a nonreducing sugar residue. When glycogen is broken down to be used as an energy source, glucose units are removed one at a time from the nonreducing ends by enzymes.

== Characterization ==
Several qualitative tests are used to detect the presence of reducing sugars. Two of them use solutions of copper(II) ions: Benedict's reagent (Cu^{2+} in aqueous sodium citrate) and Fehling's solution (Cu^{2+} in aqueous sodium tartrate). The reducing sugar reduces the copper(II) ions in these test solutions to copper(I), which then forms a brick red copper(I) oxide precipitate. Reducing sugars can also be detected with the addition of Tollens' reagent, which consist of silver ions (Ag^{+}) in aqueous ammonia. When Tollens' reagent is added to an aldehyde, it precipitates silver metal, often forming a silver mirror on clean glassware.

3,5-dinitrosalicylic acid is another test reagent, one that allows quantitative detection. It reacts with a reducing sugar to form 3-amino-5-nitrosalicylic acid, which can be measured by spectrophotometry to determine the amount of reducing sugar that was present.

Some sugars, such as sucrose, do not react with any of the reducing-sugar test solutions. However, a non-reducing sugar can be hydrolyzed using dilute hydrochloric acid. After hydrolysis and neutralization of the acid, the product may be a reducing sugar that gives normal reactions with the test solutions.

All carbohydrates are converted to aldehydes and respond positively in Molisch's test. But the test has a faster rate when it comes to monosaccharides.

== Importance in medicine ==
Fehling's solution was used for many years as a diagnostic test for diabetes, a disease in which blood glucose levels are dangerously elevated by a failure to produce enough insulin (type 1 diabetes) or by an inability to respond to insulin (type 2 diabetes). Measuring the amount of oxidizing agent (in this case, Fehling's solution) reduced by glucose makes it possible to determine the concentration of glucose in the blood or urine. This then enables the right amount of insulin to be injected to bring blood glucose levels back into the normal range.

== Importance in food chemistry ==
=== Maillard reaction ===
The carbonyl groups of reducing sugars react with the amino groups of amino acids in the Maillard reaction, a complex series of reactions that occurs when cooking food. Maillard reaction products (MRPs) are diverse; some are beneficial to human health, while others are toxic. However, the overall effect of the Maillard reaction is to decrease the nutritional value of food. One example of a toxic product of the Maillard reaction is acrylamide, a neurotoxin and possible carcinogen that is formed from free asparagine and reducing sugars when cooking starchy foods at high temperatures (above 120 °C). However, evidence from epidemiological studies suggest that dietary acrylamide is unlikely to raise the risk of people developing cancer.

=== Food quality ===
The level of reducing sugars in wine, juice, and sugarcane are indicative of the quality of these food products, and monitoring the levels of reducing sugars during food production has improved market quality. The conventional method for doing so is the Lane-Eynon method, which involves titrating the reducing sugar with copper(II) in Fehling's solution in the presence of methylene blue, a common redox indicator. However, it is inaccurate, expensive, and sensitive to impurities.
