= Christen Thomsen Barfoed =

Danish chemist

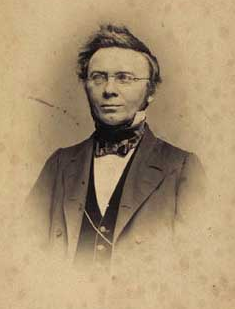
Christen Thomsen Barfoed

Christen Thomsen Barfoed (16 June 1815 – 30 April 1889) was a Danish chemist credited with the development of a method to detect monosaccharide sugars in a solution, now known as the Barfoed's test. Barfoed is also credited with having introduced systematic chemical analyses in Danish agricultural sciences.
