= International Numbering System for Food Additives =

Naming system for food additives

The International Numbering System for Food Additives (INS) is an international naming system for food additives, aimed at providing a short designation of what may be a lengthy actual name. It is defined by Codex Alimentarius, the international food standards organisation of the World Health Organization (WHO) and Food and Agriculture Organization (FAO) of the United Nations (UN). The information is published in the document Class Names and the International Numbering System for Food Additives, first published in 1989, with revisions in 2008 and 2011. The INS is an open list, "subject to the inclusion of additional additives or removal of existing ones on an ongoing basis".

== Numbering system ==
INS numbers consist of three or four digits, optionally followed by an alphabetical suffix to further characterize individual additives. On packaging in the European Union (EU), approved food additives are written with a prefix of E. An additive that appears in the INS does not automatically have a corresponding E number.

INS numbers are assigned by the committee to identify each food additive. INS numbers generally correspond to E numbers for the same compound, e.g. INS 102, Tartrazine, is also E102. INS numbers are not unique and, in fact, one number may be assigned to a group of similar compounds.

== List of INS numbers ==
- Except where stated, the list of INS numbers and associated food additives is based on the most recent publication of the Codex Alimentarius, Class Names and the International Numbering System for Food Additives, first published in 1989, with revisions in 2008 and 2011.
- E number and American approval flags are derived from other sources.
- In the table below, food additives approved for the EU are listed with an 'E', and those approved for Australia and New Zealand with an 'A'. and for the US with a U, even though the US does not use the INS numbering system.

INS #	Approvals			Names	Type
INS #	Australia New Zealand	Europe	United States	Names	Type
100	A	E	U	curcumins	colour
100(i)	A	E	U	curcumin	colour (yellow and orange)
100(ii)	A	E	U	turmeric	colour (yellow and orange)
101	A	E	U	riboflavins	
101(i)	A	E	U	riboflavin, synthetic (vitamin B_{2})	colour (yellow and orange)
101(ii)	A	E		Riboflavin-5'-phosphate	colour (yellow and orange)
101(iii)	A	E		riboflavin from Bacillus subtilis	colour (yellow and orange)
102	A	E	U	tartrazine	colour (yellow and orange) (FDA: FD&C Yellow #5)
103	A			alkannin, chrysoine resorcinol	colour (red)
104	A	E		Quinoline Yellow WS	colour (yellow and orange) (FDA: D&C Yellow #10)
107		E		Yellow 2G	colour (yellow and orange)
110	A	E	U	Sunset Yellow FCF	colour (yellow and orange) (FDA: FD&C Yellow #6)
~~111~~	?	E		Orange GGN. Delisted	colour (orange)
120	A	E	U	Cochineal, carmines	colour (red)
121			U	Citrus red 2, Orcein, Orchil	colour (red)
122	A	E		azorubine, carmoisine	colour (red) (FDA: Ext D&C Red #10)
123		E		amaranth Delisted	colour (red) (FDA: [DELISTED] Red #2)
124	A	E		Brilliant Scarlet 4R, Ponceau 4R	colour (FDA: Ext D&C Red #8)
125				Ponceau SX, Scarlet GN	colour
~~126~~				Ponceau 6R. Delisted	colour
127		E	U	erythrosine	colour (red) (FDA: FD&C Red #3)
128		E		Red 2G	colour
129	A	E	U	Allura red AC	colour (FDA: FD&C Red #40)
130				Indanthrene blue RS	colour (blue)
131		E		Patent blue V	colour (blue)
132	A	E	U	indigo carmine, indigotine	colour (blue) (FDA: FD&C Blue #2)
133	A	E	U	Brilliant blue FCF	colour (FDA: FD&C Blue #1)
140	A	E	U	chlorophylls	colour (green)
141	A	E	U	Chlorophylls and chlorophyllins, copper complexes	
141(i)			U	Chlorophylls, copper complexes	colour (green)
141(ii)			U	Chlorophyllins, copper complexes, potassium and sodium salts	colour (green)
142	A	E		Green S	colour (green)
143	A		U	Fast green FCF	colour (FDA: FD&C Green #3)
150	A	E	U	Caramels	
150a	A	E	U	caramel I – plain	colour (brown and black)
150b	A	E	U	caramel II – sulfite caramel	colour (brown and black)
150c	A	E	U	caramel III – ammonia caramel	colour (brown and black)
150d	A	E	U	caramel IV – sulfite ammonia caramel	colour (brown and black)
151	A	E		Brilliant Black BN (Black PN)	colour (brown and black)
152	?	?		Carbon black	colour (brown and black)
153	A	E		Vegetable carbon	colour (brown and black)
154		E		Brown FK	colour (brown and black)
155	A	E		Chocolate Brown HT	colour
160a	A	E	U	carotenes	
160a(i)	A	E	U	beta-carotene, synthetic	colour
160a(ii)	A	E	U	beta-carotene, vegetable	colour
160a(iii)	A	E	U	beta-carotene, Blakeslea trispora	colour
160a(iv)	A	E	U	beta-carotene, algae	colour
160b		E	U	annatto extracts	
160b(i)		E	U	annatto extracts, bixin-based	colour
160b(ii)		E	U	annatto extracts, norbixin-based	colour
160c	A	E	U	paprika oleoresin (paprika extract)	colour
160d	A	E	U	lycopenes	
160d(i)	A	E	U	lycopene, synthetic	colour
160d(ii)	A	E	U	lycopene, tomato	colour
160d(iii)	A	E	U	lycopene, Blakeslea trispora	colour
160e	A	E	U	beta-apo-8'-carotenal (C 30)	colour
160f	A	E	U	beta-apo-8'-carotenic acid ethyl ester	colour
161a	A		U	flavoxanthin	colour
161b	A	E	U	luteins	
161b(i)	A	E	U	lutein from Tagetes erecta	colour
161b(ii)	A	E	U	Tagetes extract	colour
161c	A		U	kryptoxanthin	colour
161d	A		U	rubixanthin	colour
161e	A		U	violaxanthin	colour
161f	A		U	rhodoxanthin	colour
161g		E	U	canthaxanthin	colour
161h	?	?	U	zeaxanthins	colour
161h(i)	?	?	U	zeaxanthin, synthetic	colour
161h(ii)	?	?	U	zeaxanthin-rich extract from Tagetes erecta	colour
~~161i~~				citranaxanthin. Delisted	colour
~~161j~~				astaxanthin. Delisted	colour
162	A	E	U	beet red	colour
163	A	E	U	anthocyanins	colour
163(ii)	A	E	U	Grape skin extract	colour
163(iii)	A	E	U	Blackcurrant extract	colour
163(iv)	A	E	U	Purple corn colour	colour
163(v)	A	E	U	Red cabbage colour	colour
164	A		U	Gardenia yellow	
165			U	Gardenia blue	colour
166			U	sandalwood	colour
170		E	U	calcium carbonates	
170(i)		E	U	calcium carbonate	Acidity regulator, anticaking agent, stabilizer, surface colourant
170(ii)		E	U	calcium hydrogen carbonate	Acidity regulator, anticaking agent, stabilizer, surface colourant
171	A	E	U	titanium dioxide	colour (white)
172	A	E	U	iron oxides	
172(i)	A	E	U	iron oxide, black	colour
172(ii)	A	E	U	iron oxide, red	colour
172(iii)	A	E	U	iron oxide, yellow	colour
173		E	U	aluminium	colour (silver)
174		E	U	silver	colour (silver)
175		E	U	gold	colour (gold)
180		E		Lithol Rubine BK	colour
181		E	U	tannins	colour, emulsifier, stabiliser, thickener
182			U	orchil	colour
200		E	U	sorbic acid	preservative
201			U	sodium sorbate	preservative
202		E	U	potassium sorbate	preservative
203		E	U	calcium sorbate	preservative
209			U	heptyl p-hydroxybenzoate	preservative
210		E	U	benzoic acid	preservative
211	A	E	U	sodium benzoate	preservative
212	A	E	U	potassium benzoate	preservative
213	A	E	U	calcium benzoate	preservative
214		E	U	ethyl para-hydroxybenzoate	preservative
215		E	U	sodium ethyl para-hydroxybenzoate	preservative
216	A		U	propylparaben (propyl para-hydroxybenzoate)	preservative
217			U	sodium propyl para-hydroxybenzoate	preservative
218	A	E	U	methylparaben (methyl para-hydroxybenzoate)	preservative
219		E	U	sodium methyl para-hydroxybenzoate	preservative
220	A	E	U	sulfur dioxide	preservative, antioxidant
221	A	E	U	sodium sulfite	preservative, antioxidant
222	A	E	U	sodium bisulfite (sodium hydrogen sulfite)	preservative, antioxidant
223	A	E	U	sodium metabisulfite	preservative, antioxidant, bleaching agent
224	A	E	U	potassium metabisulfite	preservative, antioxidant
225	A		U	potassium sulfite	preservative, antioxidant
226		E	U	calcium sulfite	preservative, antioxidant
227		E	U	calcium bisulfite, calcium hydrogen sulfite	preservative, antioxidant
228	A	E	U	potassium bisulfite, potassium hydrogen sulfite	preservative, antioxidant
230		E	U	diphenyl (biphenyl)	preservative
231		E	U	orthophenyl phenol (2-hydroxybiphenyl)	preservative
232		E	U	sodium orthophenyl phenol	preservative
233			U	thiabendazole	preservative
234	A	E	U	nisin	preservative
235	A	E	U	natamycin (pimaricin)	preservative
236			U	formic acid	preservative
237			U	sodium formate	preservative
238			U	calcium formate	preservative
239		E	U	hexamethylene tetramine (hexamine)	preservative
240			U	formaldehyde	preservative
241			U	gum guaicum	preservative
242	A	E	U	dimethyl dicarbonate	preservative
249	A	E	U	potassium nitrite	preservative, colour fixative
250	A	E	U	sodium nitrite	preservative, colour fixative
251	A	E	U	sodium nitrate	preservative, colour fixative
252	A	E	U	potassium nitrate	preservative, colour fixative
260	A	E	U	glacial acetic acid	preservative, acidity regulator
261	A	E	U	potassium acetates	preservative, acidity regulator
262	A	E	U	sodium acetate, sodium hydrogen acetate	preservative, acidity regulator
263	A	E	U	calcium acetate	preservative, acidity regulator
264	A		U	ammonium acetate	preservative, acidity regulator
265			U	dehydroacetic acid	preservative
266			U	sodium dehydroacetate	preservative
270	A	E	U	lactic acid	acidity regulator, preservative, antioxidant
280	A	E	U	propionic acid	preservative
281	A	E	U	sodium propionate	preservative
282	A	E	U	calcium propionate	preservative
283	A	E	U	potassium propionate	preservative
284		E	U	boric acid	preservative
285		E	U	sodium tetraborate, borax	preservative
290	A	E	U	carbon dioxide	acidity regulator, propellant
296	A	E	U	malic acid	acidity regulator
297	A	E	U	fumaric acid	acidity regulator
300	A	E	U	ascorbic acid	antioxidant (water-soluble)
301	A	E	U	sodium ascorbate	antioxidant (water-soluble)
302	A	E	U	calcium ascorbate	antioxidant (water-soluble)
303	A		U	potassium ascorbate	antioxidant (water-soluble)
304	A	E	U	ascorbyl palmitate, ascorbyl stearate	antioxidant (fat soluble)
307	A	E	U	tocopherols	
307a	A	E	U	l-alpha-tocopherol	antioxidant
307b	A	E	U	mixed tocopherol concentrate	antioxidant
307c	A	E	U	dl-alpha-tocopherol	antioxidant
308	A	E	U	gamma-tocopherol(synthetic)	antioxidant
309	A	E	U	delta-tocopherol(synthetic)	antioxidant
310	A	E	U	propyl gallate	antioxidant
311	A	E	U	octyl gallate	antioxidant
312	A	E	U	dodecyl gallate	antioxidant
315	A	E	U	erythorbic acid	antioxidant
316	A	E	U	sodium erythorbate	antioxidant
317	?	?	U	erythorbin acid	antioxidant
318	?	?	U	sodium erythorbin	antioxidant
319	A		U	tert-butylhydroquinone	antioxidant
320	A	E	U	butylated hydroxyanisole (BHA)	antioxidant (fat soluble)
321	A	E	U	butylated hydroxytoluene (BHT)	antioxidant (fat soluble)
322	A	E	U	lecithins	antioxidant, emulsifier
325	A	E	U	sodium lactate	food acid
326	A	E	U	potassium lactate	food acid
327	A	E	U	calcium lactate	food acid
328	A		U	ammonium lactate	food acid
329	A		U	magnesium lactate	food acid
330	A	E	U	citric acid	food acid
331	A	E	U	sodium citrates	food acid
332	A	E	U	potassium citrates	food acid
333	A	E	U	calcium citrates	food acid, firming agent
334	A	E	U	L(+)-tartaric acid	food acid
335	A	E	U	sodium tartrates	food acid
336	A	E	U	potassium tartrates	food acid
337	A	E	U	potassium sodium tartrate	food acid
338	A	E	U	phosphoric acid	food acid
339	A	E	U	sodium phosphates	mineral salt
340	A	E	U	potassium phosphates	mineral salt
341	A	E	U	calcium phosphates	mineral salt, anti-caking agent, firming agent
342	A		U	ammonium phosphates	mineral salt
343	A	E	U	magnesium phosphates	mineral salt, anti-caking agent
344			U	lecithin citrate	preservative
345			U	magnesium citrate	acidity regulator
349	A		U	ammonium malate	food acid
350	A	E	U	sodium malates	food acid
351	A	E	U	potassium malate	food acid
352	A	E	U	calcium malates	food acid
353	A	E	U	metatartaric acid	food acid, emulsifier
354	A	E	U	calcium tartrate	food acid, emulsifier
355	A	E	U	adipic acid	food acid
356		E	U	sodium adipate	food acid
357	A	E	U	potassium adipate	food acid
359			U	ammonium adipates	acidity regulator
363		E	U	succinic acid	food acid
364			U	sodium succinates	acidity regulator, flavour enhancer
365	A		U	sodium fumarate	food acid
366	A		U	potassium fumarate	food acid
367	A		U	calcium fumarate	food acid
368	A		U	ammonium fumarate	food acid
370			U	1,4-heptonolactone	food acid
375	A		U	niacin (nicotinic acid), nicotinamide (vitamin B_{3})	colour retention agent
380	A	E	U	triammonium citrate	food acid
381	A		U	ferric ammonium citrate, ammonium ferrocitrate	food acid
384			U	isopropyl citrates	antioxidant, preservative
385	A	E	U	calcium disodium EDTA	preservative
386			U	disodium ethylenediaminetetraacetate	antioxidant, preservative
387			U	oxystearin	antioxidant, sequestrant
388			U	thiodipropionic acid	antioxidant
389			U	dilauryl thiodipropionate	antioxidant
390			U	distearyl thiodipropionate	antioxidant
391			U	phytic acid	preservative
399			U	calcium lactobionate	stabilizer
400	A	E	U	alginic acid	thickener, vegetable gum, stabilizer, gelling agent, emulsifier
401	A	E	U	sodium alginate	thickener, vegetable gum, stabilizer, gelling agent, emulsifier
402	A	E	U	potassium alginate	thickener, vegetable gum, stabilizer, gelling agent, emulsifier
403	A	E	U	ammonium alginate	thickener, vegetable gum, stabilizer, gelling agent, emulsifier
404	A	E	U	calcium alginate	thickener, vegetable gum, stabilizer, gelling agent, emulsifier
405	A	E	U	propylene glycol alginate, propane-1,2-diol alginate	thickener, vegetable gum, stabilizer, emulsifier
406	A	E	U	agar	thickener, vegetable gum, stabilizer, gelling agent
407	A	E	U	carrageenan	thickener, vegetable gum, stabilizer, gelling agent, emulsifier
407a	A	E	U	processed eucheuma seaweed	thickener, vegetable gum, stabilizer, gelling agent, emulsifier
409	A		U	arabinogalactan	thickener, vegetable gum
410	A	E	U	locust bean gum	thickener, vegetable gum, stabilizer, gelling agent, emulsifier
412	A	E	U	guar gum	thickener, vegetable gum, stabilizer
413	A	E	U	tragacanth	thickener, vegetable gum, stabilizer, emulsifier
414	A	E	U	gum acacia, gum arabic	thickener, vegetable gum, stabilizer, emulsifier
415	A	E	U	xanthan gum	thickener, vegetable gum, stabilizer
416	A	E	U	karaya gum	thickener, vegetable gum, stabilizer, emulsifier
417		E	U	tara gum	thickener, vegetable gum, stabilizer
418	A	E	U	gellan gum	thickener, vegetable gum, stabilizer, emulsifier
420	A	E	U	sorbitol	humectant, emulsifier, sweetener
421	A	E	U	mannitol	humectant, anti-caking agent, sweetener
422	A	E	U	glycerin	humectant, sweetener
425		E	U	konjac, konjac gum, konjac glucomannate	thickener, vegetable gum
428	A	E	U	gelatin, gelatine (not classified as an additive)	carrier, emulsifier, gelling agent, stabiliser, thickener
430		?	U	polyoxyethylene (8) stearate	emulsifier, stabilizer
431		E	U	polyoxyethylene (40) stearate	emulsifier
432		E	U	polysorbate 20	emulsifier
433	A	E	U	polysorbate 80	emulsifier
434		E	U	polysorbate 40	emulsifier
435	A	E	U	polysorbate 60	emulsifier
436	A	E	U	polysorbate 65	emulsifier
440	A	E	U	pectin	vegetable gum, emulsifier
441			U	Superglycerinated hydrogenated rapeseed oil, Hydrogenated rapeseed oil superglycerinated, Superglycerinated fully hydrogenated rapeseed oil	Emulsifier
442	A	E	U	Mixed ammonium salts of phosphorylated glyceridess	emulsifier
443	?		U	brominated vegetable oil	emulsifier, stabiliser
444	A	E	U	sucrose acetate isobutyrate	emulsifier, stabiliser
445		E	U	glycerol esters of wood rosins	emulsifier
450	A	E	U	diphosphates	mineral salt, emulsifier
451	A	E	U	triphosphates	mineral salt, emulsifier
452	A	E	U	polyphosphates	mineral salt, emulsifier
459		E	U	beta-cyclodextrin	emulsifier
460	A	E	U	powdered cellulose, microcrystalline cellulose	anti-caking agent
461	A	E	U	methylcellulose	thickener, emulsifier, vegetable gum
463		E	U	hydroxypropyl cellulose	thickener, vegetable gum, emulsifier
464	A	E	U	hydroxypropyl methylcellulose	thickener, vegetable gum, emulsifier
465	A	E	U	methyl ethyl cellulose, ethyl methyl cellulose	thickener, vegetable gum, emulsifier
466	A	E	U	sodium carboxymethylcellulose	emulsifier
468			U	crosslinked sodium carboxymethylcellulose	emulsifier
469			U	enzymatically hydrolyzed carboxymethyl cellulose	emulsifier
470	A		U	magnesium stearate	emulsifier, stabiliser
470a		E	U	sodium, potassium and calcium salts of fatty acids	emulsifier, stabiliser, anti-caking agent
470b		E	U	magnesium salts of fatty acids	emulsifier, stabiliser, anti-caking agent
471	A	E	U	mono- and diglycerides of fatty acids – glyceryl monostearate, glyceryl distearate	emulsifier
472a	A	E	U	acetic acid esters of mono- and diglycerides of fatty acids	emulsifier
472b	A	E	U	lactic acid esters of mono- and diglycerides of fatty acids	emulsifier
472c	A	E	U	citric acid esters of mono- and diglycerides of fatty acids	emulsifier
472d	A	E	U	tartaric acid esters of mono- and diglycerides of fatty acids	emulsifier
472e	A	E	U	diacetyltartaric acid esters of mono- and diglycerides of fatty acids	emulsifier
472f		E	U	mixed acetic and tartaric acid esters of mono- and diglycerides of fatty acids	emulsifier
473	A	E	U	sucrose esters of fatty acids	emulsifier
474		E	U	sucroglycerides	emulsifier
475	A	E	U	polyglycerol esters of fatty acids	emulsifier
476	A	E	U	polyglycerol polyricinoleate	emulsifier
477	A	E	U	propylene glycol esters of fatty acids	emulsifier
478	?	?	U	lactylated fatty acid esters of glycerol and propylene glycol	emulsifier
479b		E	U	thermally oxidised soya bean oil	emulsifier
480	A		U	dioctyl sodium sulfosuccinate	emulsifier
481	A	E	U	sodium stearoyl lactylate	emulsifier
482	A	E	U	calcium stearoyl lactylate	emulsifier
483		E	U	stearyl tartarate	emulsifier
491	A	E	U	sorbitan monostearate	emulsifier
492	A	E	U	sorbitan tristearate	emulsifier
493		E	U	sorbitan monolaurate	emulsifier
494		E	U	sorbitan monooleate	emulsifier
495		E	U	sorbitan monopalmitate	emulsifier
500	A	E	U	sodium carbonate, sodium bicarbonate (E500ii)	mineral salt
501	A	E	U	potassium carbonate, potassium bicarbonate	mineral salt
503	A	E	U	ammonium carbonate, ammonium bicarbonate	mineral salt
504	A	E	U	magnesium carbonate	anti-caking agent, mineral salt
507	A	E	U	hydrochloric acid	acidity regulator
508	A	E	U	potassium chloride	mineral salt
509	A	E	U	calcium chloride	mineral salt
510	A		U	ammonium chloride	mineral salt
511	A	E	U	magnesium chloride	mineral salt
512	A	E	U	stannous chloride	colour retention agent, antioxidant
513		E	U	sulfuric acid	acidity regulator
514	A	E	U	sodium sulfate	mineral salt
515	A	E	U	potassium sulfate	mineral salt, seasoning
516	A	E	U	calcium sulfate	flour treatment agent, mineral salt, sequestrant, improving agent, firming agent
517		E	U	ammonium sulfate	mineral salt, improving agent
518	A		U	magnesium sulfate, Epsom salts	mineral salt, acidity regulator, firming agent
519	A		U	cupric sulfate	mineral salt
520		E	U	aluminium sulfate	mineral salt
521		E	U	aluminium sodium sulfate	mineral salt
522		E	U	aluminium potassium sulfate	mineral salt
523		E	U	aluminium ammonium sulfate	mineral salt
524		E	U	sodium hydroxide	mineral salt
525		E	U	potassium hydroxide	mineral salt
526	A	E	U	calcium hydroxide	mineral salt
527		E	U	ammonium hydroxide	mineral salt
528		E	U	magnesium hydroxide	mineral salt
529	A	E	U	calcium oxide	mineral salt
530		E	U	magnesium oxide	anti-caking agent
535	A	E	U	sodium ferrocyanide	anti-caking agent
536	A	E	U	potassium ferrocyanide	anti-caking agent
538		E	U	calcium ferrocyanide	anti-caking agent
540			U	dicalcium diphosphate	anti-caking agent
541	A	E	U	sodium aluminium phosphate	acidity regulator, emulsifier
542	A		U	bone phosphate	anti-caking agent
544			U	calcium polyphosphates	anti-caking agent
545			U	ammonium polyphosphates	anti-caking agent
551	A	E	U	silicon dioxide	anti-caking agent
552	A	E	U	calcium silicate	anti-caking agent
553(i)	A	E	U	magnesium silicate, synthetic	anti-caking agent
553b	A	E	U	talc	anti-caking agent
554	A	E	U	sodium aluminosilicate (sodium aluminium silicate)	anti-caking agent
555		E	U	potassium aluminium silicate	anti-caking agent
556	A	E	U	calcium aluminosilicate (calcium aluminium silicate)	anti-caking agent
558	A	E	U	bentonite	anti-caking agent
559	A	E	U	kaolin, aluminium silicate	anti-caking agent
570	A	E	U	stearic acid	anti-caking agent
575	A	E	U	glucono delta-lactone	acidity regulator
576		E	U	sodium gluconate	stabiliser
577	A	E	U	potassium gluconate	stabiliser
578	A	E	U	calcium gluconate	acidity regulator
579	A	E	U	ferrous gluconate	colour retention agent
585		E	U	ferrous lactate	
620	A	E	U	glutamic acid	flavour enhancer
621	A	E	U	monosodium glutamate (MSG)	flavour enhancer
622	A	E	U	monopotassium glutamate	flavour enhancer
623	A	E	U	calcium diglutamate	flavour enhancer
624	A	E	U	monoammonium glutamate	flavour enhancer
625	A	E	U	magnesium diglutamate	flavour enhancer
626			U	guanylic acid	flavour enhancer
627	A	E	U	disodium guanylate	flavour enhancer
628		E	U	dipotassium guanylate	flavour enhancer
629		E	U	calcium guanylate	flavour enhancer
630		E	U	inosinic acid	flavour enhancer
631	A	E	U	disodium inosinate	flavour enhancer
632		E	U	dipotassium inosinate	flavour enhancer
633		E	U	calcium inosinate	flavour enhancer
634		E	U	calcium 5'-ribonucleotides	flavour enhancer
635	A	E	U	disodium 5'-ribonucleotides	flavour enhancer
636	A		U	maltol	flavour enhancer
637	A		U	ethyl maltol	flavour enhancer
640	A	E	U	glycine	flavour enhancer
641	A		U	leucine	flavour enhancer
650		E	U	zinc acetate	flavour enhancer
900	A	E	U	dimethylpolysiloxane	emulsifier, anti-caking agent
901	A	E	U	beeswax	glazing agent
902		E	U	candelilla wax	glazing agent
903	A	E	U	carnauba wax	glazing agent
904	A	E	U	shellac	glazing agent
905	A	E	U	paraffins	glazing agent
907			U	refined microcrystalline wax	glazing agent
912		E	U	montanic acid esters	humectant
914	A	E	U	oxidised polyethylene wax	humectant
920	A	E	U	L-cysteine	flour treatment agent
924				potassium bromate	flour treatment agent
925	A		U	chlorine	flour treatment agent
926	A		U	chlorine dioxide	flour treatment agent
927b		E	U	carbamide	flour treatment agent
928	A		U	benzoyl peroxide	flour treatment agent
938		E	U	argon	propellant
939		E	U	helium	propellant
941	A	E	U	nitrogen	propellant
942	A	E	U	nitrous oxide	propellant
943a		E	U	butane	propellant
943b		E	U	isobutane	propellant
950	A	E	U	Acesulfame potassium	artificial sweetener
951	A	E	U	aspartame	artificial sweetener
952	A	E		cyclamic acid, cyclamates	artificial sweetener
953	A	E	U	isomalt	humectant
954	A	E	U	saccharin	artificial sweetener
955	A		U	sucralose	artificial sweetener
956	A	E	U	alitame	artificial sweetener
957	A	E	U	thaumatin	flavour enhancer, artificial sweetener
959		E	U	neohesperidin dihydrochalcone	artificial sweetener
965	A	E	U	maltitol	humectant, stabiliser
966	A	E	U	lactitol	humectant
967	A	E	U	xylitol	humectant, stabiliser
999		E	U	quillaia extract	humectant
1001	A		U	choline salts and esters	emulsifier
1100	A		U	amylases	flour treatment agent
1102	A		U	glucose oxidase	antioxidant
1103		E	U	invertase	?
1104	A		U	lipases	flavour enhancer
1105	A	E	U	lysozyme	preservative
1200	A	E	U	polydextrose	humectant
1201	A	E	U	poly vinyl pyrrolidone	?
1202	A	E	U	polyvinylpolypyrrolidone	colour stabiliser
1400	A		U	dextrin roasted starch	thickener, vegetable gum
1401	A		U	acid treated starch	thickener, vegetable gum
1402	A		U	alkaline treated starch	thickener, vegetable gum
1403	A		U	bleached starch	thickener, vegetable gum
1404	A	E	U	oxidised starch	thickener, vegetable gum
1405	A		U	enzyme treated starch	thickener, vegetable gum
1410	A	E	U	monostarch phosphate	thickener, vegetable gum
1412	A	E	U	distarch phosphate	thickener, vegetable gum
1413	A	E	U	phosphated distarch phosphate	thickener, vegetable gum
1414	A	E	U	acetylated distarch phosphate	thickener, vegetable gum
1420	A	E	U	acetylated starch	thickener, vegetable gum
1422	A	E	U	acetylated distarch adipate	thickener, vegetable gum
1440	A	E	U	hydroxypropyl starch	thickener, vegetable gum
1442	A	E	U	hydroxypropyl distarch phosphate	thickener, vegetable gum
1450	A	E	U	starch sodium octenylsuccinate	thickener, vegetable gum
1451		E	U	acetylated oxidised starch	thickener, vegetable gum
1505	A	E	U	triethyl citrate	thickener, vegetable gum
1510				ethanol (not classified as an additive)	alcohol
1518	A	E	U	triacetin	humectant
1520	A	E	U	propylene glycol	humectant
1521	A	E	U	Polyethylene glycol	antifoaming agent
INS #	Approvals			Names	Type
INS #	Australia New Zealand	Europe	United States	Names	Type

== See also ==
- Codex Alimentarius
- Codex Alimentarius Austriacus
- E number
- Food Additives
- Federal Food, Drug, and Cosmetic Act
- Food Chemicals Codex
- List of food additives
