= Villejuif leaflet =

1970s misinformation about food additives

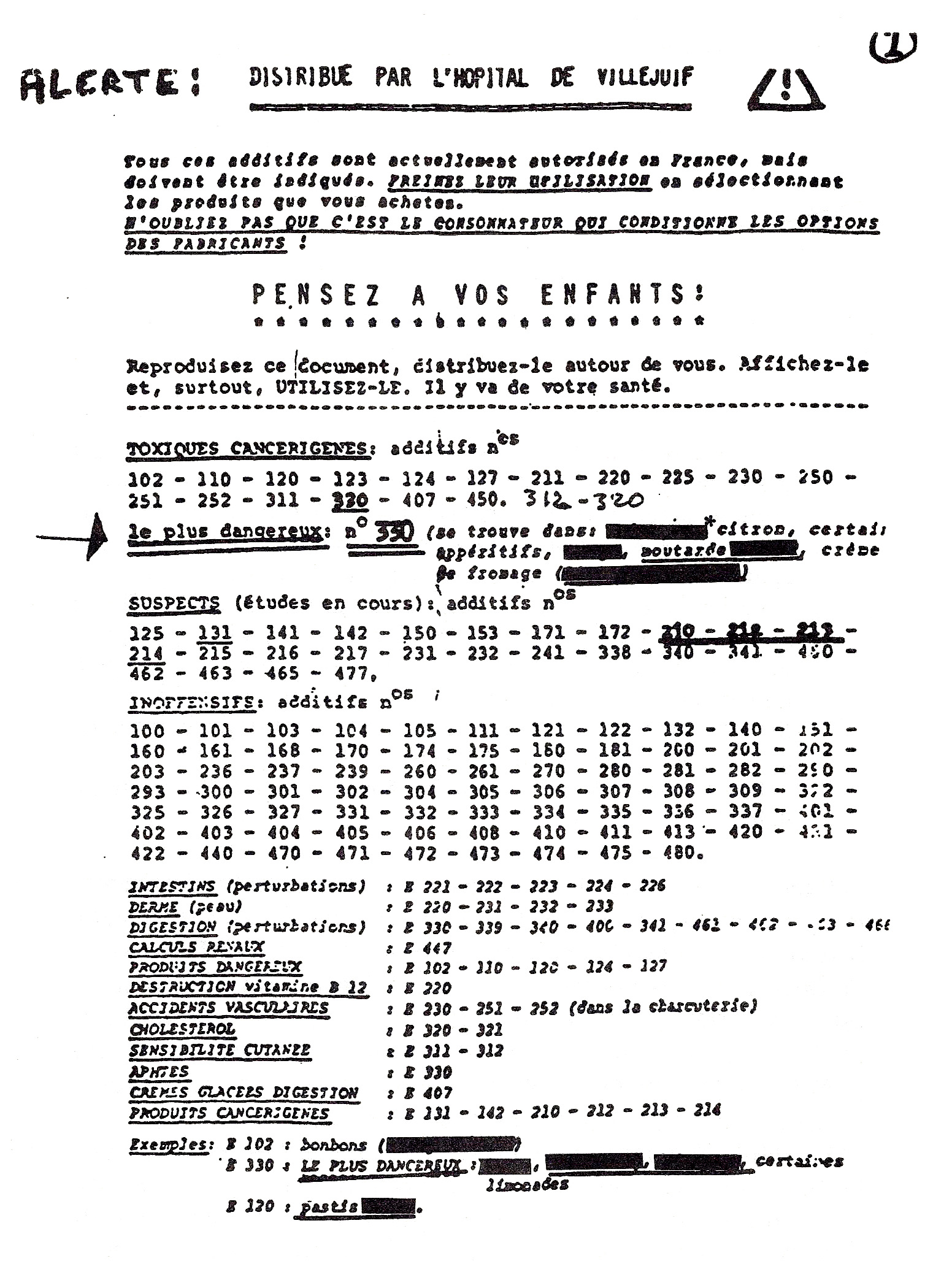
The Villejuif leaflet

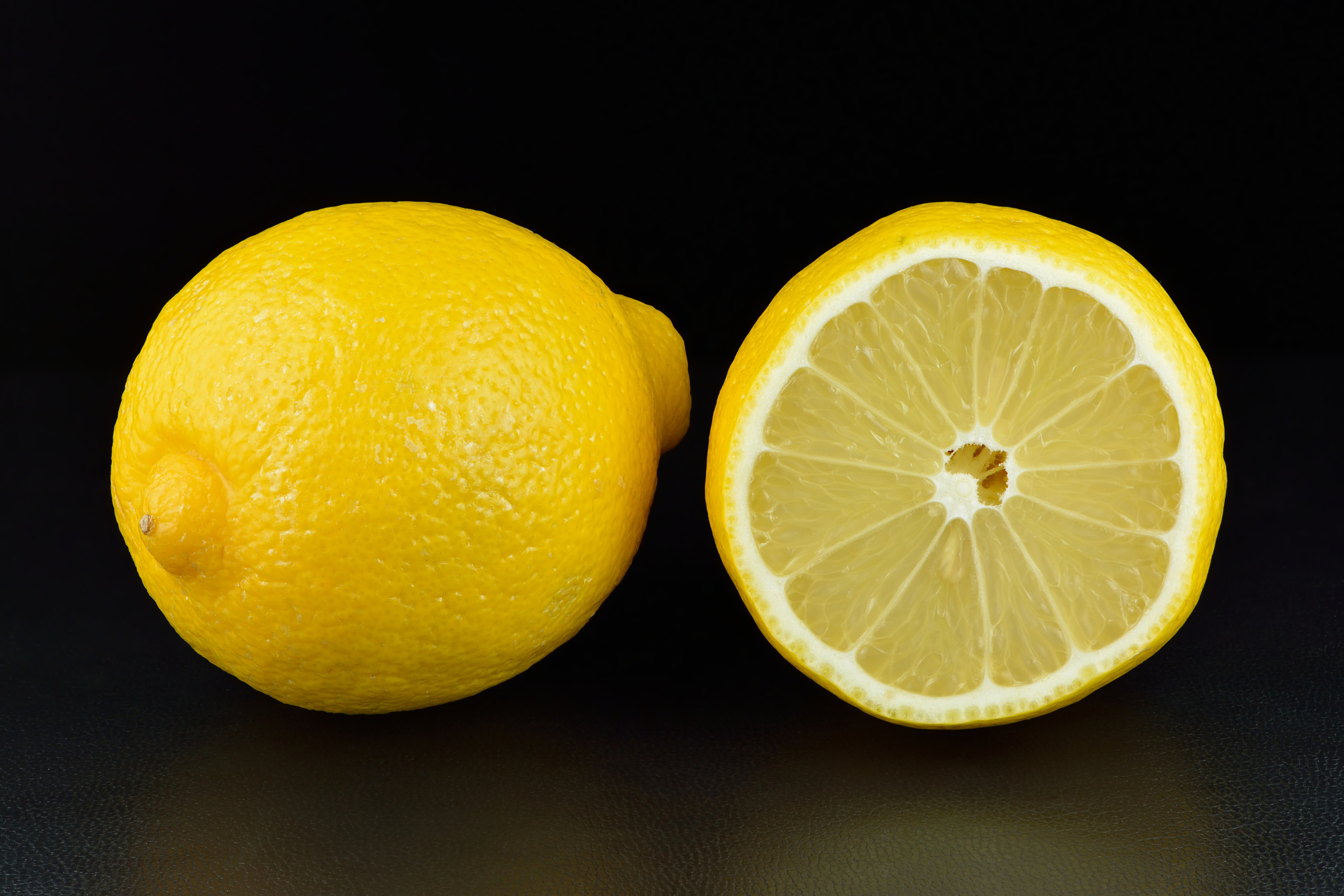
E330 (citric acid) was wrongly listed as carcinogenic in the Villejuif leaflet. It occurs naturally in every living organism and high concentrations are found in many fruits.

The Villejuif leaflet, also known as the Villejuif flyer and the Villejuif list, was a pamphlet which enjoyed wide distribution. The leaflet listed a number of safe food additives with their E numbers as alleged carcinogens. The leaflet caused mass panic in Europe in the late 1970s and 1980s. One of the entries on the list was citric acid (E330).

Its name derives from its false claim to have been produced at the hospital in Villejuif.

== History ==
The earliest known sighting of the leaflet was in February 1976, in the form of a single typewritten page in France. Homemade copies were spread across Europe for a decade in the form of a leaflet or flyer pamphlet that was distributed between friends and apart from citric acid included 16 other chemicals in a list of substances that it called dangerous toxins and carcinogens. The original author of the typewritten list was never found, and the leaflet affected about 7 million people in its uncontrollable propagation. In a survey of 150 housewives, 19% said they have stopped buying these brands, and 69% planned to do so.

== List contents ==
Multiple versions of this leaflet circulated, the exact set of suspect and dangerous substances differing from version to version. The following substances have been included on at least one such leaflet:

- Toxic: E102, E110, E120, E123, E124, E127, E211, E220 (Sulfur dioxide), E225, E230, E239, E250, E251, E252, E311, E312, E320, E321, E330 (Citric Acid, listed as "most dangerous"), E407, E450
- Suspect: E125, E131, E141 (Chlorophyll derivatives), E142, E150, E153, E171 (Titanium White), E172 (Iron Oxide), E173 (Aluminium), E210, E212, E213, E214/E215, E216/E217, E221, E222, E223, E224, E226, E231, E232, E233, E240 (Formaldehyde), E338 (Phosphoric acid), E339, E340, E341, E460 (Cellulose), E461, E462, E463, E464, E465, E466

== Research ==
This phenomenon became the subject of academic empirical research by J. N. Kapferer, president of the Foundation for the Study and Information on Rumors (an organisation in Paris, France) and professor of communication at L'Ecole des Hautes Etudes Commerciales and l'Institut Supérieur des Affaires (a university in France) because of its persistence contrary to all official denials about the safety of citric acid and its wide distribution, as about half of all French housewives had been exposed to it. The resulting scientific paper was published in 1989 in the 53rd volume of the Public Opinion Quarterly, a journal associated with the American Association for Public Opinion Research and published by the University of Chicago Press (now published by the Oxford University Press).

According to a 1990 book also written by Jean-Noël Kapferer, the leaflet drew the attention of experts, who immediately recognised its dubious nature. The leaflet wrongly listed E330, citric acid, as the most dangerous of all carcinogens.

== Spread ==
The rumour, considered one of the most important experienced in the French society, spread via a translated leaflet in Great Britain, Germany, Italy, the Middle East, and Africa.

Journalists working for newspapers distributed the list of alleged carcinogens verbatim; even a 1984 book written by a medical doctor aiming at informing the general public about the dangers of cancer included the substances in the flyer in a list of carcinogens, without checking the flyer's accuracy.

== False connection with the hospital of Villejuif ==
It was reproduced many times by many individuals as friends sought to inform other friends of the harmful chemicals in their food, and in the course of uncontrolled copying a version of the leaflet included the name of the Villejuif Hospital, making victims to the rumour believe that the list was authorised by it. Even though the hospital (as Gustave-Roussy Institute) denied any association, it was unable to stop the further dissemination of the flyer, which went on from hand to hand until at least 1986 and was passed to elementary schools, organisations, and even various hospitals, while medical schools and pharmacy schools also fell victim to the list because of its (unauthorised and untrue) reference to the well-known hospital of Villejuif.

== Possible explanations ==
Citric acid is important for a chemical process named Krebs cycle, but Krebs means cancer in German, and it has been suggested that this linguistic confusion may have been responsible for false claims that citric acid is carcinogenic.

== See also ==
- Chemophobia
