= E111 =

E111 may be:

- A European medical form now replaced by the European Health Insurance Card
- Orange GGN, a food additive, classified under E111 in the European Union
- The DB Class 111 locomotive
- Roentgenium, element 111 in the periodic table
