= E474 =

E474 may refer to:

- A fictional aircraft based on the Airbus A380 in the movie Flightplan
- Sucroglycerides, molecules used as emulsifiers
