= 2-hydroxybiphenyl 3-monooxygenase =

Class of enzymes

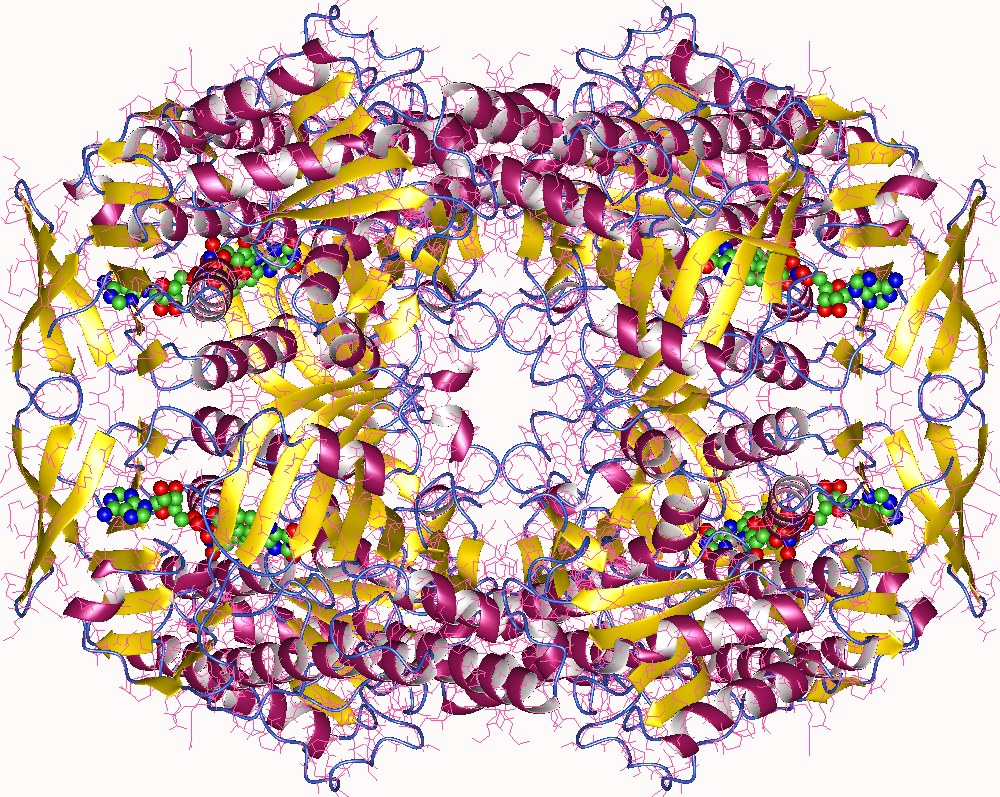
- 2-hydroxybiphenyl-3-monooxygenase tetramer, Pseudomonas nitroreducens

Identifiers
- EC no.: 1.14.13.44
- CAS no.: 118251-39-1

Databases
- IntEnz: IntEnz view
- BRENDA: BRENDA entry
- ExPASy: NiceZyme view
- KEGG: KEGG entry
- MetaCyc: metabolic pathway
- PRIAM: profile
- PDB structures: RCSB PDB PDBe PDBsum
- Gene Ontology: AmiGO / QuickGO
Search
- PMC: articles
- PubMed: articles
- NCBI: proteins

2-hydroxybiphenyl 3-monooxygenase (EC 1.14.13.44) is an enzyme that catalyzes the chemical reaction

2-Phenylphenol
+ NADH + H^{+}
O_{2}
H_{2}O
Biphenyl-2,3-diol
+ NAD^{+}

The four substrates of this enzyme are 2-phenylphenol, reduced nicotinamide adenine dinucleotide (NADH), oxygen, and a proton. Its products are biphenyl-2,3-diol, oxidised NAD^{+}, and water.

This enzyme is an oxidoreductase, acting on paired donors, with molecular oxygen as oxidant and incorporation of one of its atoms. The systematic name of this enzyme class is 2-hydroxybiphenyl,NADH:oxygen oxidoreductase (3-hydroxylating).
