= E125 =

E125 may refer to:

- European route E125
- Scarlet GN or C.I. Food Red 1, Ponceau SX, FD&C Red No. 4, or C.I. 14700, a red azo dye once used as a food dye
- Element 125, unbipentium, a predicted chemical element; see Extended periodic table § Superactinides
