= C15H22O5 =

The molecular formula C_{15}H_{22}O_{5} (molar mass: 282.33 g/mol) may refer to:

- Artemisinin, a drug used to treat multi-drug resistant strains of falciparum malaria
- Octyl gallate, an antioxidant and food preservative
