= E633 =

E633 may refer to:

- Calcium inosinate, a food additive
- FS Class E632, a sub-type of Italian locomotives
