= E312 =

E312 may refer to:

- Dodecyl gallate, an antioxidant
- European route E312, a European B class road in the Netherlands, connecting the cities of Flushing (Vlissingen) and Eindhoven
