= C19H30O5 =

The molecular formula C_{19}H_{30}O_{5} (molar mass: 338.43 g/mol) may refer to:

- Dodecyl gallate,
- Idebenone, a synthetic analog of coenzyme Q10
- Piperonyl butoxide (PBO)
