= Chocolate Brown =

Chocolate Brown may refer to:

- Brown HT (also Chocolate Brown HT), a brown synthetic coal tar diazo dye
- Chocolate (color), a shade of brown
- "Chocolate Brown", a song from The Cranberries' 2001 album Wake Up and Smell the Coffee
- Irene Scruggs (1901–1981; (also billed as Chocolate Brown), American Piedmont blues and country blues singer

== See also ==
- Chocolate brownie
