= E311 =

E311 can refer to:

- Octyl gallate, the E-number for a food additive ester
- European route E311, European road
- E 311 road (United Arab Emirates)
