= C16H10N2Na2O7S2 =

The molecular formula C_{16}H_{10}N_{2}Na_{2}O_{7}S_{2} (molar mass: 452.369 g/mol) may refer to:

- Orange G
- Orange GGN
- Sunset Yellow FCF
