= Mepron =

Mepron may refer to:

- Mepron, a brand name of the medication atovaquone
- Mepron (rumen-protected methionine), a trademarked source of methionine used in dairy cattle
