= C6H7KO6 =

The molecular formula C_{6}H_{7}KO_{6} (molar mass: 214.21 g/mol, exact mass: 213.9880 u) may refer to:

- Potassium ascorbate
- Potassium erythorbate
