= C6H7NaO6 =

The molecular formula C_{6}H_{7}NaO_{6} (molar mass: 198.11 g/mol, exact mass: 198.0140 u) may refer to:

- Sodium erythorbate
- Sodium ascorbate
