= Penicillium viticola =

Scientific classification
- Kingdom: Fungi
- Division: Ascomycota
- Class: Eurotiomycetes
- Order: Eurotiales
- Family: Aspergillaceae
- Genus: Penicillium
- Species: P. viticola

Binomial name
- Penicillium viticola Nonaka & Masuma 2011

Type strain
- JCM 17636, FKI-4410

Species of fungus

Penicillium viticola is a species of fungus in the genus Penicillium which was isolated from grapes in Yamanashi Prefecture in Japan. Penicillium viticola produces calcium malate
