= Tanora =

Tangerine carbonated drink sold in Ireland

- Type: Tangerine-flavoured carbonated drink
- Manufacturer: Coca-Cola HBC AG
- Origin: Cork City, Ireland
- Introduced: 1930s
- Color: Orange
- Flavor: Tangerine
- Ingredients: Carbonated water, sugar, tangerine juice from concentrate (2.6%), citric acid, flavourings, colours (Quinoline Yellow WS, Brown HT, Caramel E-150d), preservatives (potassium sorbate, sodium benzoate)
- Website: ie.coca-colahellenic.com/en/brands-and-campaigns/explore-our-brands-and-products/tanora/

Tanora is a tangerine carbonated drink, sold in Ireland, predominantly in Munster. It was introduced by John Daly & Co, a mineral water bottler in Cork City. The drink’s original recipe is credited to James “Jim” Lynam of Cork, who is said to have sold the formula to John Daly & Co while employed in its laboratory, in return for shares in the company. The brand is owned by Coca-Cola Bottlers Ireland, a subsidiary of Coca-Cola Hellenic. Tanora is packaged in 2-litre and 500ml plastic bottles. It was also available in 330ml cans, but these ceased production in June 2010; 200ml glass bottles (for the licensed trade) have already been withdrawn, both due to lack of demand.

In 1969, Stephen Barrett described his childhood liking for Tanora, "then, as now, the modish choice among those on the threshold of life". When Denis Irwin was playing for Manchester United, his mother would send him Tanora and Tayto crisps from Cork. In the play Disco Pigs, Pig orders "Two Battur burgurs! Two Sauce! Two Chips! Two Peas! Two Tanora!".

In April 2011, Tanora was reformulated with a new taste including carrot and blackcurrant flavourings, and new packaging with the subtitle "A Cork legend" was introduced. The new flavour proved unpopular, and a Facebook vote along with taste-tests in Cork retail stores was scheduled to take place during July 2011. The new flavour was later taken off the market and replaced with the old, it kept the same bottle as the new flavour but had "original formula" on the side so it could be distinguished from the new flavour.

In January 2018, ahead of the Irish government's planned introduction of a "sugar tax" later that year, Tanora was slightly reformulated again, to replace some of its sugar with artificial sweeteners.

== See also ==
- New Coke
