= 9,10-Dihydro-9-oxa-10-phosphaphenanthrene-10-oxide =

Names
- Other names 3,4:5,6-Dibenzo-2H-1,2-oxaphosphorin-2-oxide

Identifiers
CAS Number	35948-25-5
3D model (JSmol)	Interactive image
ChemSpider	10613171; 9,10-Dihydro-9-oxa-10-phosphaphenanthrene: 11408428
EC Number	252-813-7
PubChem CID	6328250; 9,10-Dihydro-9-oxa-10-phosphaphenanthrene: 20504138
UNII	63LTW1C2TR
- InChI: InChI=1S/C12H9O2P/c13-15-12-8-4-2-6-10(12)9-5-1-3-7-11(9)14-15/h1-8,15H Key: VBQRUYIOTHNGOP-UHFFFAOYSA-N; 9,10-Dihydro-9-oxa-10-phosphaphenanthrene: InChI=1S/C12H9OP/c1-3-7-11-9(5-1)10-6-2-4-8-12(10)14-13-11/h1-8,14H Key: HDXGUOZQUVDYMC-UHFFFAOYSA-N
- SMILES: C1=CC=C2C(=C1)C3=CC=CC=C3P(=O)O2

Properties
Chemical formula	C_{12}H_{9}O_{2}P
Molar mass	216.176 g·mol^{−1}
Appearance	white solid
Melting point	119–121 °C (246–250 °F; 392–394 K)
- Except where otherwise noted, data are given for materials in their standard state (at 25 °C [77 °F], 100 kPa). Infobox references

9,10-Dihydro-9-oxa-10-phosphaphenanthrene-10-oxide (DOPO) is an organophosphorus compound that is used to produce fire retardants. From the chemistry perspective, it is a derivative of hypophosphorous acid as well as a derivative of phenanthrene. The reactivity of the P-H center allows for the conjugation of DOPO to many monomers. Such monomers are incorporated into polymers, conferring fire retardant properties. It is mainly used for nylon and polyesters, as well as epoxides.

The compound is prepared from 2-phenylphenol, which condenses with one equivalent of phosphorus trichloride. Heating that species in the presence of aluminium trichloride results in cyclization. The procedure is completed by hydrolysis.
