= Propylene glycol alginate =

Chemical compound used as emulsifier, stabilizer, and thickener in food products

Names
- Other names Hydroxypropyl alginate, Propane 1,2-diol alginate, E405

Identifiers
CAS Number	9005-37-2
ChemSpider	none
ECHA InfoCard	100.123.773
EC Number	618-414-0
E number	E405 (thickeners, ...)
PubChem CID	131752735
UNII	26CD3J2R0C
CompTox Dashboard (EPA)	DTXSID7044186

Properties
Molar mass	234.21 per structural unit (theoretical)
Appearance	white to yellowish brown filamentous, grainy, granular or powdered forms
Solubility in water	Soluble
- Except where otherwise noted, data are given for materials in their standard state (at 25 °C [77 °F], 100 kPa). verify (what is ?) Infobox references

Propylene glycol alginate (PGA) is an emulsifier, stabilizer, and thickener used in food products. It is a food additive with E number E405. Chemically, propylene glycol alginate is an ester of alginic acid, which is derived from kelp. Some of the carboxyl groups are esterified with propylene glycol, some are neutralized with an appropriate alkali, and some remain free.

== See also ==
- List of food additives, Codex Alimentarius
