= Mepron (rumen-protected methionine) =

Mepron is the brand name for a time-released, rumen-protected DL-Methionine capsule for dairy cattle. It is a registered trademark of Evonik Industries.

== Product ==
The product is a 1.8 mm x 3 mm, nearly-white cylindrical granule. The granules are free-flowing, and nearly insoluble in water. The product is nearly dust-free, and has a high level of durability. It is coated in ethylcellulose, a rugged and durable fiber. Mepron is also heat- and pH-tolerant, and has a long shelf life.

== Uses ==
Dairy-herd milk production may be limited by the amino acid methionine; therefore, the amino acid is included in cattle rations to provide a well-balanced diet. Normally a cow receives 10-20 grams of Mepron per day, depending on performance and ration composition. According to a 2006 study, results "suggest that RPM [rumen-protected methionine] may be needed to improve milk production in Holstein cows with a mean production of 35 kg d-1 milk, fed with [a] diet based on alfalfa and corn silage. The optimum response was obtained with [the] addition of 16 g d-1 of ruminally protected methionine. Further studies are needed to determine if cows may respond to lysine supply once the methionine requirements are met."

== Safety ==
Mepron can be handled safely and is non-toxic, according to EU chemicals legislation.
