= Calcium citrate malate =

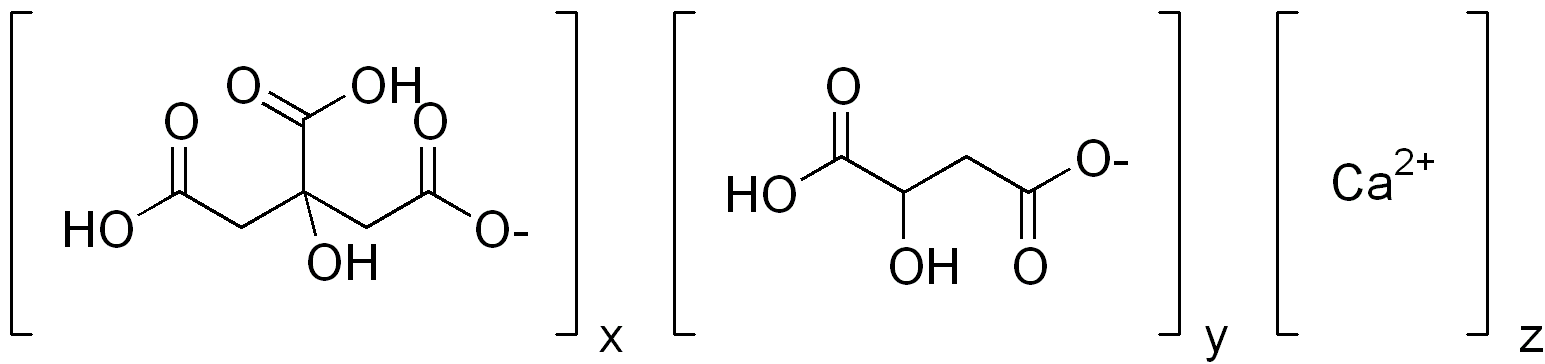

Identifiers
CAS Number	142606-53-9
3D model (JSmol)	Interactive image
ChemSpider	116963; 57427092
ECHA InfoCard	100.127.532
EC Number	604-299-4
PubChem CID	86746885
UNII	4BBS3A53GJ
CompTox Dashboard (EPA)	DTXSID00931542
- InChI: InChI=1S/C10H12O11.C6H8O7.3Ca/c11-4(1-5(12)13)8(18)21-10(9(19)20,2-6(14)15)3-7(16)17;7-3(8)1-6(13,5(11)12)2-4(9)10;;;/h4,11H,1-3H2,(H,12,13)(H,14,15)(H,16,17)(H,19,20);13H,1-2H2,(H,7,8)(H,9,10)(H,11,12);;;/q;;3*+2/p-6 Key: MIODSEIRCYRWJU-UHFFFAOYSA-H
- SMILES: C(C(C(=O)OC(CC(=O)[O-])(CC(=O)[O-])C(=O)[O-])O)C(=O)O.C(C(=O)[O-])C(CC(=O)[O-])(C(=O)[O-])O.[Ca+2].[Ca+2].[Ca+2]

Properties
Chemical formula	(C_{6}H_{7}O_{7})_{x}·(C_{4}H_{5}O_{5})_{y}·(Ca^{2+})_{z}
Molar mass	Variable
Appearance	White solid
- Except where otherwise noted, data are given for materials in their standard state (at 25 °C [77 °F], 100 kPa). verify (what is ?) Infobox references

Calcium citrate malate is a water-soluble calcium supplement. It is the calcium salt of citric acid and malic acid with variable composition.

Calcium citrate malate's bioavailability stems from its water-solubility and its method of dissolution. When dissolved, it releases calcium ions and a calcium citrate complex.

Calcium citrate malate is similar to calcium malate and other calcium salts. The European Food Safety Authority has concluded that calcium citrate malate is "slightly more bioavailable" than other forms of calcium supplementation.
