= Calcium 5'-ribonucleotides =

Food additive E634

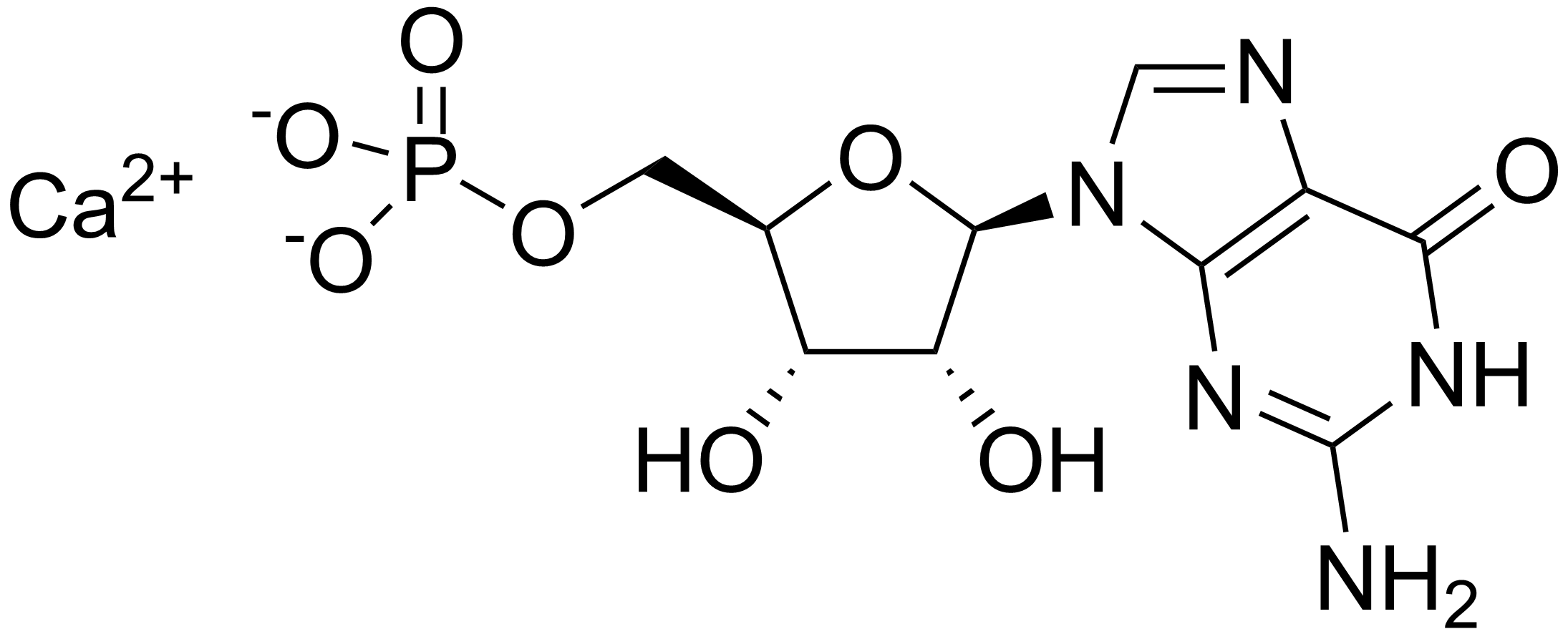
Chemical structure of calcium guanylate, one of the components of calcium 5'-ribonucleotides

Calcium 5'-ribonucleotides is a mixture used as a flavor enhancer food additive. It listed as E number reference E634. This food additive is banned in Australia and New Zealand. Calcium 5'-ribonucleotides are special compounds that come from breaking down RNA. They consist of a sugar called ribose, a phosphate group, and a calcium ion attached to the nucleotide. These compounds are important for improving the taste of food, especially when combined with substances like MSG. They work by interacting with specific receptors on our taste buds, known as calcium-sensing receptors (CaSR). This helps to make flavors taste stronger and richer. Because of their ability to enhance taste without adding extra salt or artificial flavor enhancers, calcium 5'-ribonucleotides are useful in creating more flavorful foods. The umami taste is perceived as a savory taste found in foods such as meat and cheese.

== Calcium 5'-ribonucleotides Pathway ==
Calcium 5′-ribonucleotides like inosine monophosphate (IMP) and guanosine monophosphate (GMP) help make umami taste stronger when combined with glutamate, such as in MSG (monosodium glutamate). On their own, these compounds don’t taste very strong, but when they’re present with glutamate, they boost the taste significantly. This effect is known as synergism and is a key part of how the body detects umami flavor. This process starts when glutamate and a 5′-ribonucleotide bind to the specific G-protein couple receptors known as the T1R1/T1R3 taste receptor on the tongue. This forms a heterodimer and activates a signaling pathway inside the taste cell starting with the activation of a G-protein called Gα-gust. This triggers the enzyme phospholipase Cβ2 to produce inositol trisphosphate (IP3) and diacylglycerol (DAG). The production of IP3 leads to the release of calcium ions from storage, raising the calcium concentration in the cell. This increase in calcium triggers the opening of ion channels and the release of neurotransmitters, such as ATP, which then travel to the brain through nerve signals.These neurotransmitters play a key role in transmitting the umami taste sensation to the brain.

== Kokumi Effect ==
Umami substances were founded by a Japanese scientist, Kikunae Ikeda. While eating a dish with kombu, Ikeda had tasted something very similar to savory foods, being compared to fish or meat. His curiosity led him to discover that L-glutamic acid was the source of inducing the unami taste. The kokumi effect refers to a sensory enhancement in food where it amplifies existing flavors through the interaction of certain compounds, known as kokumi substances, with specific receptors in our taste buds called calcium-sensing receptors (CaSR). These kokumi substances, such as γ-glutamyl peptides and glutathione, are naturally present in various foods and, when activated, enhance the overall flavor experience without introducing new tastes themselves. MSG, known for providing the umami or savory taste, plays a crucial role in facilitating the kokumi effect. When MSG is added to foods it promotes the binding of existing kokumi substances to their receptors. This interaction intensifies the perception of other tastes like sweetness, saltiness, and fattiness.
