= Sorbitan monopalmitate =

Food additive, E495

Names
- IUPAC name 1,4-Anhydro-D-glucitol 6-hexadecanoate
- Systematic IUPAC name (2R)-2-[(2R,3R,4S)-3,4-Dihydroxyoxolan-2-yl]-2-hydroxyethyl hexadecanoate
- Other names: Sorbitan palmitate; Span 40; E495

Identifiers
CAS Number	26266-57-9
3D model (JSmol)	Interactive image
ChemSpider	14222
ECHA InfoCard	100.043.229
EC Number	247-568-8
E number	E495 (thickeners, ...)
PubChem CID	14927
UNII	77K6Z421KU
CompTox Dashboard (EPA)	DTXSID6029335
- InChI: InChI=1S/C22H42O6/c1-2-3-4-5-6-7-8-9-10-11-12-13-14-15-20(25)27-17-19(24)22-21(26)18(23)16-28-22/h18-19,21-24,26H,2-17H2,1H3/t18-,19?,21+,22-/m1/s1 Key: IYFATESGLOUGBX-CBOZIWPYSA-N
- SMILES: CCCCCCCCCCCCCCCC(=O)OCC([C@@H]1[C@H]([C@@H](CO1)O)O)O

Properties
Chemical formula	C_{22}H_{42}O_{6}
Molar mass	402.572 g·mol^{−1}
Melting point	46–47 °C (115–117 °F; 319–320 K)

Hazards
Flash point	113 °C (235 °F; 386 K)
- Except where otherwise noted, data are given for materials in their standard state (at 25 °C [77 °F], 100 kPa). Infobox references

Sorbitan monopalmitate (SMP) is a food additive, permitted by the EU. It is entry E495 in the E number list of permitted food additives. It is also known under the trade name Span 40.

== Synopsis ==
Sorbitan monopalmitate has been known since at least 1959.

Around 2000, SMP was permitted by the EU in bakery products, icings, marmalades, simulations of milk and cream, beverage whiteners, liquid concentrates of fruit and herbs, sorbets, emulsified sauces, food supplements and chewing gum amongst others.

SMP is a polysorbate that is derived from the mixture of partial esters of sorbitol treated with palmitic acid. SMP is a lipophilic surfactant. It may be found in combination with polysorbates. It is used to modify crystallisation of fats. It is insoluble in water. Up to 25 mg/kg bodyweight can be processed by humans. SMP is metabolized to sorbitol and palmitic acid, without any apparent side effects. The use of animal fats, like pork, in the production of SMP is possible.
