= Erythorbic acid =

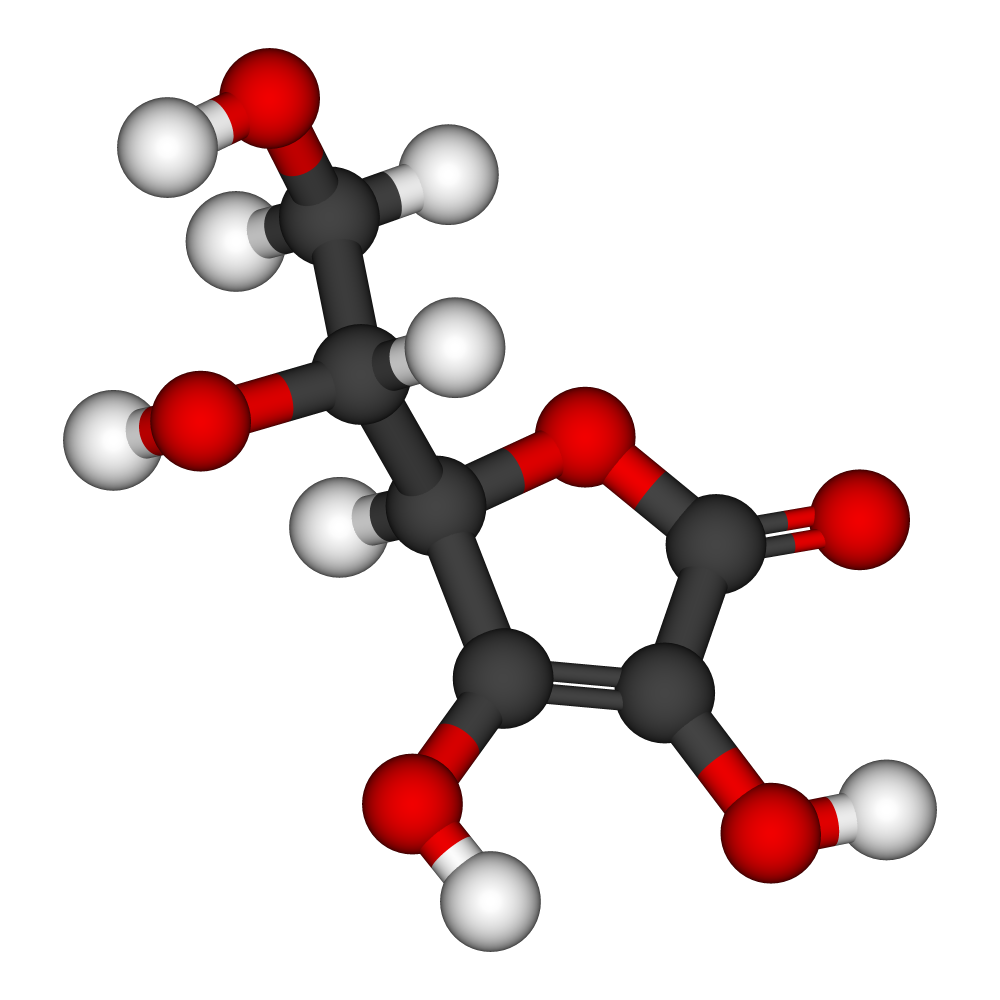

Names
- IUPAC name D-erythro-Hex-2-enono-1,4-lactone
- Systematic IUPAC name (5R)-5-[(1R)-1,2-Dihydroxyethyl]-3,4-dihydroxyfuran-2(5H)-one
- Other names D-Araboascorbic acid, Erythorbate, Isoascorbic acid, D-isoascorbic acid

Identifiers
CAS Number	89-65-6
3D model (JSmol)	Interactive image
ChEBI	CHEBI:51438
ChemSpider	16736142
ECHA InfoCard	100.001.753
E number	E315 (antioxidants, ...)
PubChem CID	6981
UNII	311332OII1
CompTox Dashboard (EPA)	DTXSID6026537
- InChI: InChI=1S/C6H8O6/c7-1-2(8)5-3(9)4(10)6(11)12-5/h2,5,7-10H,1H2/t2-,5-/m1/s1 Key: CIWBSHSKHKDKBQ-DUZGATOHSA-N; InChI=1/C6H8O6/c7-1-2(8)5-3(9)4(10)6(11)12-5/h2,5,7-10H,1H2/t2-,5-/m1/s1 Key: CIWBSHSKHKDKBQ-DUZGATOHBV
- SMILES: OC=1[C@H](OC(=O)C=1O)[C@H](O)CO

Properties
Chemical formula	C_{6}H_{8}O_{6}
Molar mass	176.124 g·mol^{−1}
Density	0.704 g/cm^{3}
Melting point	164 to 172 °C (327 to 342 °F; 437 to 445 K) (decomposes)
Acidity (pK_{a})	2.1

Hazards
NFPA 704 (fire diamond)	1 1 0

Related compounds
Other cations	Calcium erythorbate, sodium erythorbate, potassium erythorbate
- Except where otherwise noted, data are given for materials in their standard state (at 25 °C [77 °F], 100 kPa). verify (what is ?) Infobox references

Erythorbic acid (isoascorbic acid, D-araboascorbic acid) is a stereoisomer (C5 epimer) of ascorbic acid (vitamin C). It is synthesized by a reaction between methyl 2-keto-D-gluconate and sodium methoxide. It can also be synthesized from sucrose or by strains of Penicillium that have been selected for this feature. It is denoted by E number E315, and is widely used as an antioxidant in processed foods.

== Health effects ==
Clinical trials have been conducted to investigate aspects of the nutritional value of erythorbic acid. One such trial investigated the effects of erythorbic acid on vitamin C metabolism in young women; no effect on vitamin C uptake or clearance from the body was found.

A later study found that erythorbic acid is a potent enhancer of nonheme-iron absorption, just like ascorbate. This is thought to be due to it exerting the same iron-reducing and iron-chelating activity as ascorbic acid. Neither of these reactions is mediated by an enzyme, which would confer some chiral selectivity. It is twice as effective as ascorbic acid in enhancing non-heme iron absorption. Americans are estimated to ingest 200 mg of erythorbic acid per day, making it a very important factor in understanding iron absorption.

== Uses ==
Since the U.S. Food and Drug Administration banned the use of sulfites as a preservative in foods intended to be eaten fresh (such as salad bar ingredients), the use of erythorbic acid as a food preservative has increased.

It is also used as a preservative in cured meats and frozen vegetables. Much like ascorbic acid, it increases nitrosylation of the central iron atom of muscle myoglobin, resulting in the formation of reddish-brown nitrosomyoglobin and the characteristic pink color of nitrosohemochrome or nitrosyl-heme upon cooking. Again like ascorbic acid, it reduces the formation of nitrosamines.

== History ==
It was first synthesized in 1933 by the German chemists Kurt Maurer and Bruno Schiedt.

== Production ==
Erythorbic acid is very easily produced by fermentation, being obtainable in just one step compared to ascorbic acid's two. A number of Penicillium naturally produce this chemical from glucose. This is the original process developed in the 1960s, but it has low volumetric efficiency and glucose yield compared to the modern method.

Today the industrial process is quite similar to the Reichstein process used for ascorbic acid, only chirally flipped. Microbial fermentation first produces a 2-keto-sugar acid, e.g. by Pseudomonas fluorescens AR4 converting glucose to 2-keto-D-gluconate. Then chemical rearrangement produces the product.

== Economics ==
Like ascorbic acid, the production of erythorbic acid is concentrated in China. Its price is less volatile than that of ascorbic acid, making it an attractive alternative in non-nutritive uses in times of high ascorbic acid prices.

== Related compounds ==
The structurally similar C5 sugar acid, D-erythroascorbic acid, is made by baker's yeast and other fungi, acting as an antioxidant in their own cells. It is made by and has some antioxidant activity in Manduca sexta. It has no industrial use, however.
