= Potassium erythorbate =

- Potassium erythorbate

Names
- IUPAC name Potassium 5-(1,2-dihydroxyethyl)-3-hydroxy -4-oxo-furan-2-olate
- Other names Erythorbic acid, potassium salt; E316

Identifiers
CAS Number	17175-66-5
3D model (JSmol)	Interactive image
ChemSpider	30647045
EC Number	239-432-1
PubChem CID	102218423
- InChI: InChI=1S/C6H8O6.K/c7-1-2(8)5-3(9)4(10)6(11)12-5;/h2,5,7-10H,1H2;/q;+1/p-1/t2-,5-;/m1./s1 Key: CONVKSGEGAVTMB-RKJRWTFHSA-M
- SMILES: [K+].[O-]C=1[C@H](OC(=O)C=1O)[C@H](O)CO

Properties
Chemical formula	C_{6}H_{7}KO_{6}
Molar mass	214.22 g/mol
- Except where otherwise noted, data are given for materials in their standard state (at 25 °C [77 °F], 100 kPa). verify (what is ?) Infobox references

Potassium erythorbate (C_{6}H_{7}KO_{6}) is a food additive. Chemically, it is the potassium salt of erythorbic acid. As an antioxidant structurally related to vitamin C, it helps improve flavor stability and prevents the formation of carcinogenic nitrosamines.
