= Calcium guanylate =

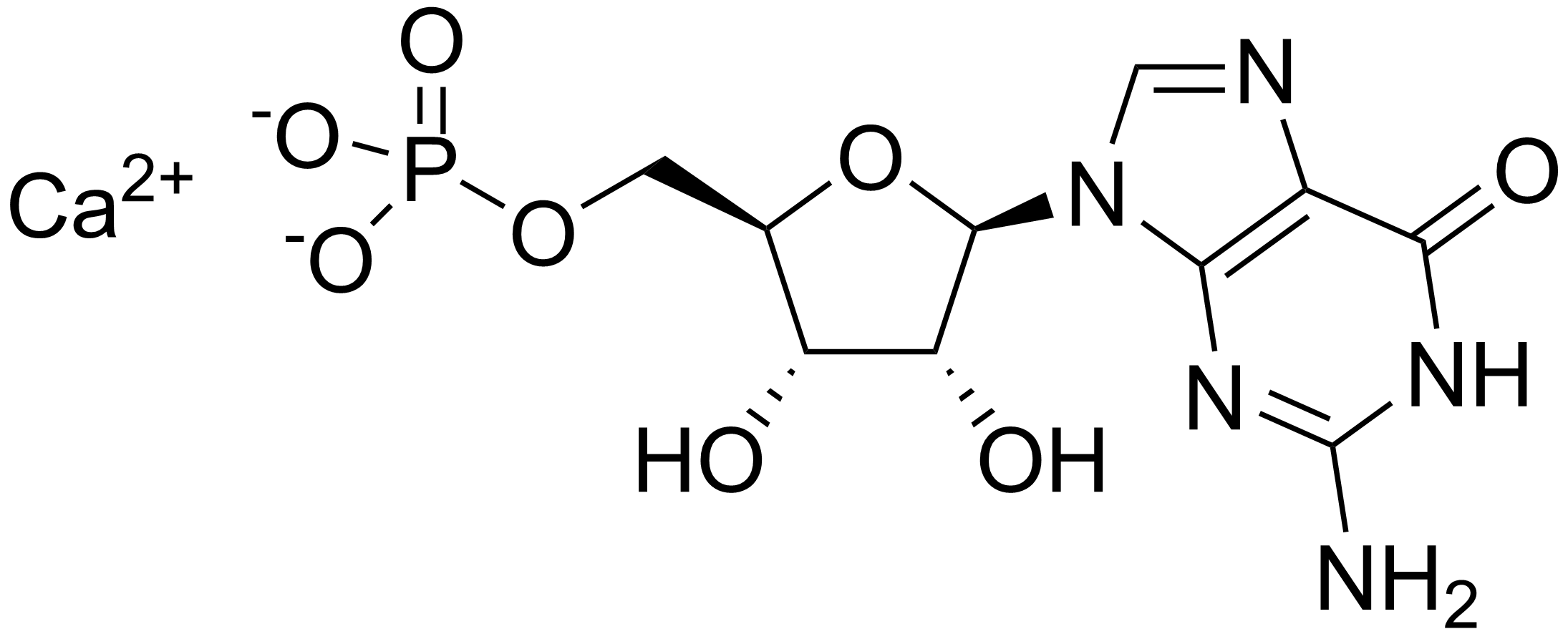

Names
- IUPAC name Calcium 5′-guanylate
- Systematic IUPAC name Calcium [(2R,3S,4R,5R)-5-(2-amino-6-oxo-1,6-dihydro-9H-purin-9-yl)-3,4-dihydroxyoxolan-2-yl]methyl phosphate
- Other names: 5′-Guanylic acid calcium salt

Identifiers
CAS Number	15816-68-9; 38966-30-2 (non-specific)
3D model (JSmol)	Interactive image
ChemSpider	18598951
E number	E629 (flavour enhancer)
PubChem CID	12856107
UNII	8DB3O97A3G
CompTox Dashboard (EPA)	DTXSID40511549
- InChI: InChI=1S/C10H14N5O8P.Ca/c11-10-13-7-4(8(18)14-10)12-2-15(7)9-6(17)5(16)3(23-9)1-22-24(19,20)21;/h2-3,5-6,9,16-17H,1H2,(H2,19,20,21)(H3,11,13,14,18);/q;+2/p-2/t3-,5-,6-,9-;/m1./s1 Key: KAFMRSAFJZENBN-GWTDSMLYSA-L; InChI=1/C10H14N5O8P.Ca/c11-10-13-7-4(8(18)14-10)12-2-15(7)9-6(17)5(16)3(23-9)1-22-24(19,20)21;/h2-3,5-6,9,16-17H,1H2,(H2,19,20,21)(H3,11,13,14,18);/q;+2/p-2/t3-,5-,6-,9-;/m1./s1 Key: KAFMRSAFJZENBN-NBKZKEOTBW
- SMILES: O[C@H]1[C@@H](O)[C@H](N2C=NC3=C2NC(N)=NC3=O)O[C@@H]1COP([O-])([O-])=O.[Ca+2]

Properties
Chemical formula	C_{10}H_{12}CaN_{5}O_{8}P
Molar mass	401.285 g·mol^{−1}
- Except where otherwise noted, data are given for materials in their standard state (at 25 °C [77 °F], 100 kPa). verify (what is ?) Infobox references

Calcium guanylate is a compound with formula Ca(C_{10}H_{12}O_{4}N_{5}PO_{4}). It is the calcium salt of guanylic acid. It is present in all living cells as part of RNA, and is commercially prepared from yeast extract or fish.

As a food additive, it is used as a flavor enhancer, particularly low-salt products and has the E number E629.
