= Calcium inosinate =

Names
- IUPAC name Calcium 5′-inosinate
- Systematic IUPAC name Calcium [(2R,3S,4R,5R)-3,4-dihydroxy-5-(6-oxo-1,6-dihydro-9H-purin-9-yl)oxolan-2-yl]methyl phosphate
- Other names: Calcium inosine-5′-monophosphate; E633

Identifiers
CAS Number	38966-29-9
3D model (JSmol)	Interactive image; Interactive image
ChemSpider	18598952
E number	E633 (flavour enhancer)
PubChem CID	135565141
UNII	DE2I245H9C
CompTox Dashboard (EPA)	DTXSID00628642
- InChI: InChI=1S/C10H13N4O8P.Ca/c15-6-4(1-21-23(18,19)20)22-10(7(6)16)14-3-13-5-8(14)11-2-12-9(5)17;/h2-4,6-7,10,15-16H,1H2,(H,11,12,17)(H2,18,19,20);/q;+2/p-2/t4-,6-,7-,10-;/m1./s1 Key: ZLHWLLPKQPKYJD-MCDZGGTQSA-L; InChI=1/C10H13N4O8P.Ca/c15-6-4(1-21-23(18,19)20)22-10(7(6)16)14-3-13-5-8(14)11-2-12-9(5)17;/h2-4,6-7,10,15-16H,1H2,(H,11,12,17)(H2,18,19,20);/q;+2/p-2/t4-,6-,7-,10-;/m1./s1 Key: ZLHWLLPKQPKYJD-BWNJPNSSBG
- SMILES: [O-]P(OC[C@H]1O[C@@H](N2C(NC=NC3=O)=C3N=C2)[C@H](O)[C@@H]1O)([O-])=O.[Ca+2]; [Ca+2].[O-]P([O-])(=O)OC[C@H]3O[C@@H](n2cnc1c2ncnc1O)[C@H](O)[C@@H]3O

Properties
Chemical formula	C_{10}H_{11}CaN_{4}O_{8}P
Molar mass	386.270 g·mol^{−1}
Solubility in water	sparingly
- Except where otherwise noted, data are given for materials in their standard state (at 25 °C [77 °F], 100 kPa). verify (what is ?) Infobox references

Calcium inosinate is a calcium salt of the nucleoside inosine. Under the E number E633, it is a food additive used as a flavor enhancer.
