= Calcium malate =

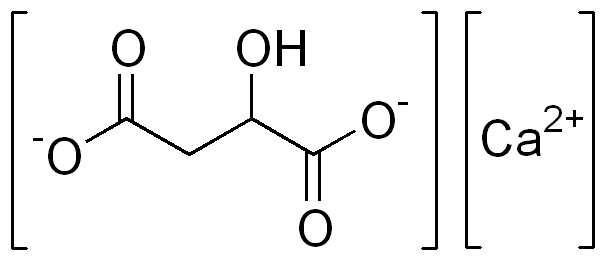

Names
- IUPAC name Calcium 2-hydroxybutanedioate

Identifiers
CAS Number	16426-50-9
3D model (JSmol)	Interactive image
ChemSpider	146673
ECHA InfoCard	100.037.710
E number	E352 (antioxidants, ...)
PubChem CID	167659
UNII	D48OP746DW
CompTox Dashboard (EPA)	DTXSID30936929
- InChI: InChI=1S/C4H6O5.Ca/c5-2(4(8)9)1-3(6)7;/h2,5H,1H2,(H,6,7)(H,8,9);/q;+2/p-2 Key: OLOZVPHKXALCRI-UHFFFAOYSA-L; InChI=1/C4H6O5.Ca/c5-2(4(8)9)1-3(6)7;/h2,5H,1H2,(H,6,7)(H,8,9);/q;+2/p-2 Key: OLOZVPHKXALCRI-NUQVWONBAL
- SMILES: [Ca+2].[O-]C(=O)CC(O)C([O-])=O

Properties
Chemical formula	C_{4}H_{4}CaO_{5}
Molar mass	172.15 g/mol
Solubility in water	slightly soluble
- Except where otherwise noted, data are given for materials in their standard state (at 25 °C [77 °F], 100 kPa). verify (what is ?) Infobox references

Calcium malate is a compound with formula Ca(C_{2}H_{4}O(COO)_{2}). It is the calcium salt of malic acid. As a food additive, it has the E number E352.

Calcium malate occurs naturally in maple sap, but is filtered out in the production of maple syrup.

It is related to, but different from, calcium citrate malate.
