= Ethyl methyl cellulose =

- R=H or CH_{3} or CH_{2}CH_{3}

Names
- Other names Methyl ethyl cellulose; Ethyl methyl ether of cellulose; E465; INS No. 465

Identifiers
CAS Number	9004-69-7
Abbreviations	MEC
ChemSpider	none
E number	E465 (thickeners, ...)

Properties
Chemical formula	[C_{6}H_{7}O_{2}(OH)_{x}(OCH_{3})_{y}(OC_{2}H_{5})_{z}]_{n}, z = 0.57-0.8, y = 0.2-0.4, x = 3-(x+y)
Molar mass	30000-40000 g/mol
- Except where otherwise noted, data are given for materials in their standard state (at 25 °C [77 °F], 100 kPa). Infobox references

Ethyl methyl cellulose is a thickener, vegetable gum, foaming agent and emulsifier.

Its E number is E465.

== Description ==
Chemically, it is a derivative of cellulose with ethyl and methyl groups attached by ether linkages.

It can be prepared by treatment of cellulose with dimethyl sulfate and ethyl chloride in the presence of an alkali.

== See also ==
- Ethyl cellulose
- Methyl cellulose
