= Chlorophyllin =

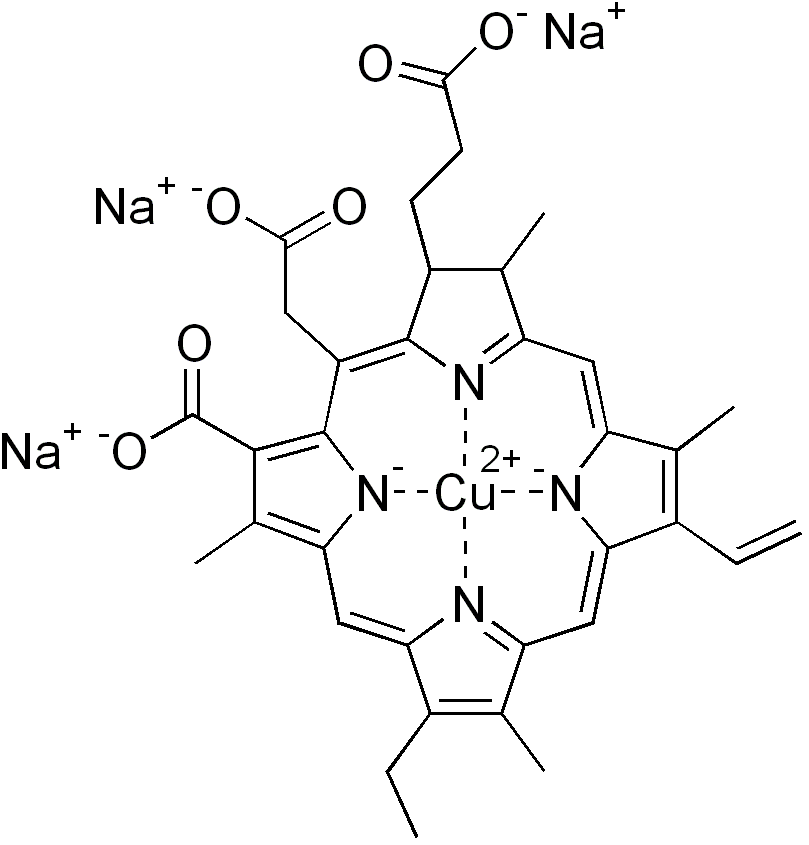

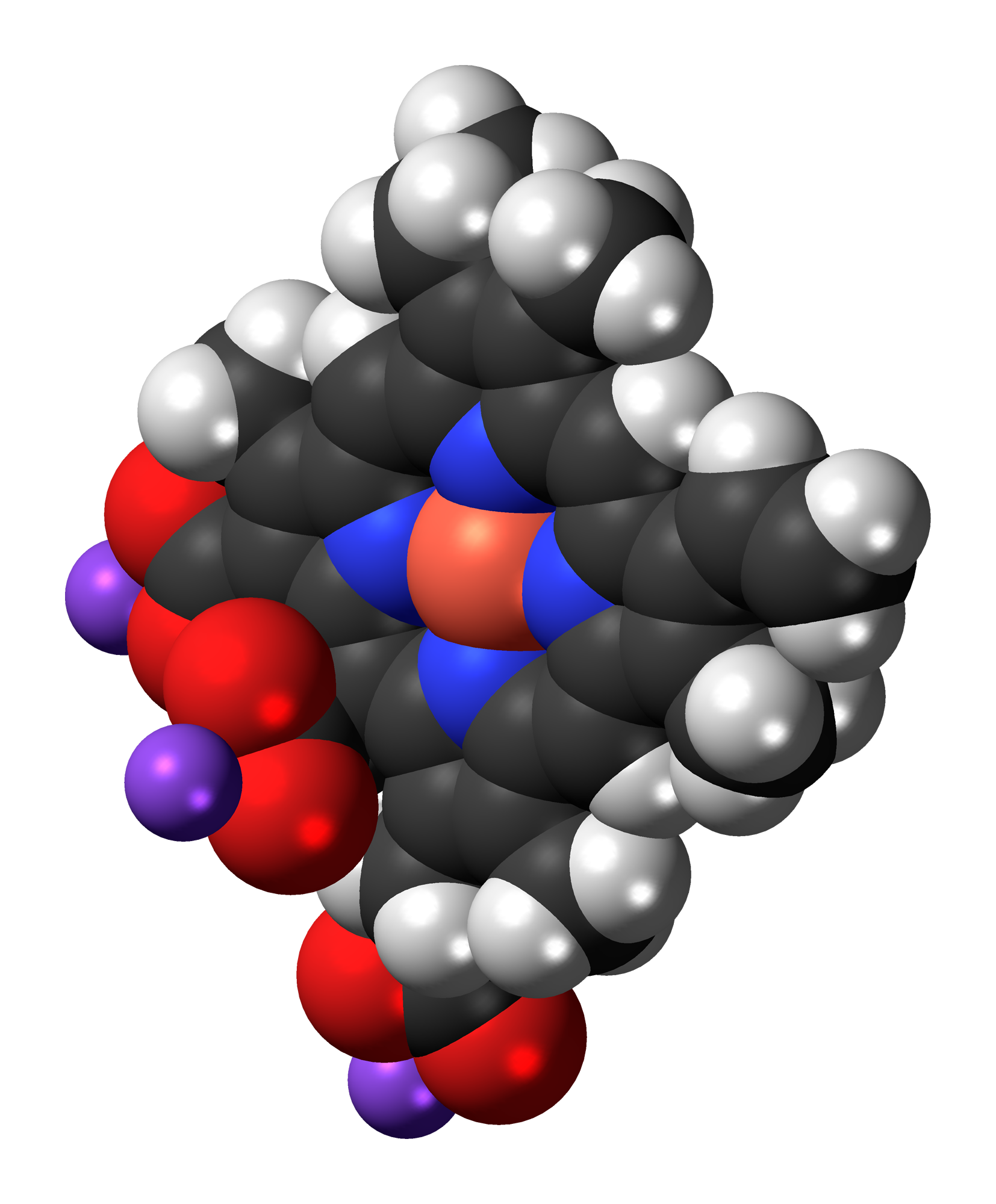

Names
- Other names Natural green 5, E140(ii), E141(ii)

Identifiers
CAS Number	11006-34-1
3D model (JSmol)	Interactive image
ChemSpider	4586363
ECHA InfoCard	100.031.117
PubChem CID	5479494
UNII	1D276TYV9O
CompTox Dashboard (EPA)	DTXSID1045956
- InChI: InChI=1S/C34H36N4O6/c1-7-19-15(3)23-12-25-17(5)21(9-10-29(39)40)32(37-25)22(11-30(41)42)33-31(34(43)44)18(6)26(38-33)14-28-20(8-2)16(4)24(36-28)13-27(19)35-23/h7,12-14,17,21,35-36H,1,8-11H2,2-6H3,(H,39,40)(H,41,42)(H,43,44)/b23-12-,24-13-,25-12-,26-14-,27-13-,28-14-,32-22-,33-22-/t17-,21-/m0/s1 Key: OYINILBBZAQBEV-HHGNVTQFSA-N; InChI=1/C34H36N4O6/c1-7-19-15(3)23-12-25-17(5)21(9-10-29(39)40)32(37-25)22(11-30(41)42)33-31(34(43)44)18(6)26(38-33)14-28-20(8-2)16(4)24(36-28)13-27(19)35-23/h7,12-14,17,21,35-36H,1,8-11H2,2-6H3,(H,39,40)(H,41,42)(H,43,44)/b23-12-,24-13-,25-12-,26-14-,27-13-,28-14-,32-22-,33-22-/t17-,21-/m0/s1 Key: OYINILBBZAQBEV-HHGNVTQFBL
- SMILES: CCC1=CC2=NC1=CC3=C(C4=C(C(C(=C4[N-]3)C5=NC(=CC6=NC(=C2)C(=C6C)C=C)C(C5CCC(=O)[O-])C)C(=O)[O-])[O-])C.[Cu+2].[Cu+2]

Properties
Chemical formula	C_{34}H_{31}CuN_{4}Na_{3}O_{6}
Molar mass	724.159 g·mol^{−1}
- Except where otherwise noted, data are given for materials in their standard state (at 25 °C [77 °F], 100 kPa). Infobox references

Chlorophyllin refers to any one of a group of closely related water-soluble salts that are semi-synthetic derivatives of chlorophyll, differing in the identity of the cations associated with the anion. Widely used as a food colouring are the sodium/potassium chlorophyllins, either with the original magnesium central ion in place, known as CI Natural Green 5 with the E number E140(ii), or the copper complex CI Natural Green 5:1, E141(ii).

They are approved for use as a food colouring in the EU, UK and US.

== Chemical properties ==
Chlorophyllin is water-soluble. In vitro, it binds to some environmental mutagens such as the polycyclic aromatic hydrocarbons benzo[a]pyrene and dibenzo[a,i]pyrene. Chlorophyllin also binds to acridine orange.

== Biological properties ==
Chlorophyllin has been validated to exhibit ameliorative effects against food additive induced genotoxicity (elevating the expression of DNA repair proteins p53 and PARP) and mitochondrial dysfunction and may be used as a therapeutic tool for the management of diseases like diabetes and cancer. It has shown to modulate several protein functions including the expression of cytokine proteins NFkβ and IFNγ.

== Uses ==
=== Alternative medicine ===
Chlorophyllin is the active ingredient in a number of internally taken preparations intended to reduce odors associated with incontinence, colostomies, and similar procedures, as well as body odor in general. Also in recent years it has been used as a home remedy to treat acne and skin conditions such as pimples or blackheads, thanks to its antimicrobial effect. It is also available as a topical preparation, purportedly useful for both treatment and odor control of wounds, injuries, radiation burns, and other skin conditions. The origins of these unsubstantiated medical claims were findings from research by F. Howard Westcott in the 1940s that it was an odor blocker. The commercial value of this attribute in advertising led to many companies creating brands containing the compound in 1950–1953 in particular. It was used as a marketing tool to promote toothpaste, sanitary towels, soap and other products. However, it was soon determined that the hype surrounding chlorophyll or chlorophyllin was not warranted and the underlying research may even have been a hoax. As a result, brands rapidly discontinued its use. In the 2020s, it again became the subject of unsubstantiated medical claims, as social media influencers promoted its use in the form of "chlorophyll water", for example.

=== 3D printing ===
Chlorophyllin has been used as a biocompatible photoblocker for generating green colored hydrogels with complex inner structures.
