= Ethyl cellulose =

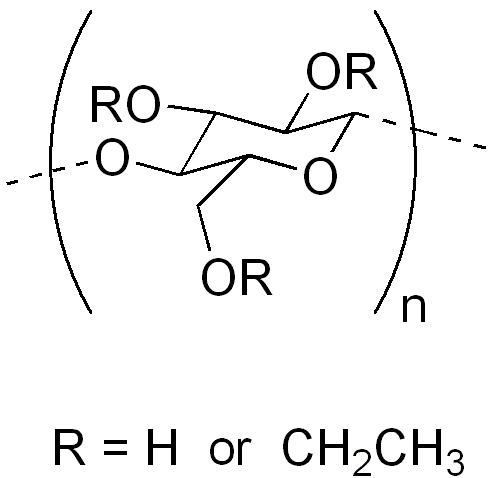

Names
- Other names Cellulose, ethyl ether; ethylated cellulose; ethylcellulose; E462

Identifiers
CAS Number	9004-57-3
ChemSpider	none
ECHA InfoCard	100.126.240
E number	E462 (thickeners, ...)
UNII	7Z8S9VYZ4B
CompTox Dashboard (EPA)	DTXSID0049608

Properties
Chemical formula	variable
Molar mass	variable
- Except where otherwise noted, data are given for materials in their standard state (at 25 °C [77 °F], 100 kPa). verify (what is ?) Infobox references

Ethyl cellulose (or ethylcellulose) is a derivative of cellulose in which some of the hydroxyl groups on the repeating glucose units are converted into ethyl ether groups. The number of ethyl groups can vary depending on the manufacturer.

It is mainly used as a thin-film coating material for coating paper, vitamin and medical pills, and for thickeners in cosmetics and in industrial processes.

Food grade ethyl cellulose is one of few non-toxic films and thickeners which are not water-soluble. This property allows it to be used to safeguard ingredients from water.

Ethyl cellulose is also used as a food additive as an emulsifier (E462).

Ethyl cellulose is commonly used as a coating material for tablets and capsules, as it provides a protective barrier that prevents the active ingredients from being released too quickly in the digestive system. EC is also used as a binder, thickener, and stabilizer in a variety of food, cosmetic, and pharmaceutical products.

== See also ==
- Ethyl methyl cellulose
- Methyl cellulose
