= Sodium orthophenyl phenol =

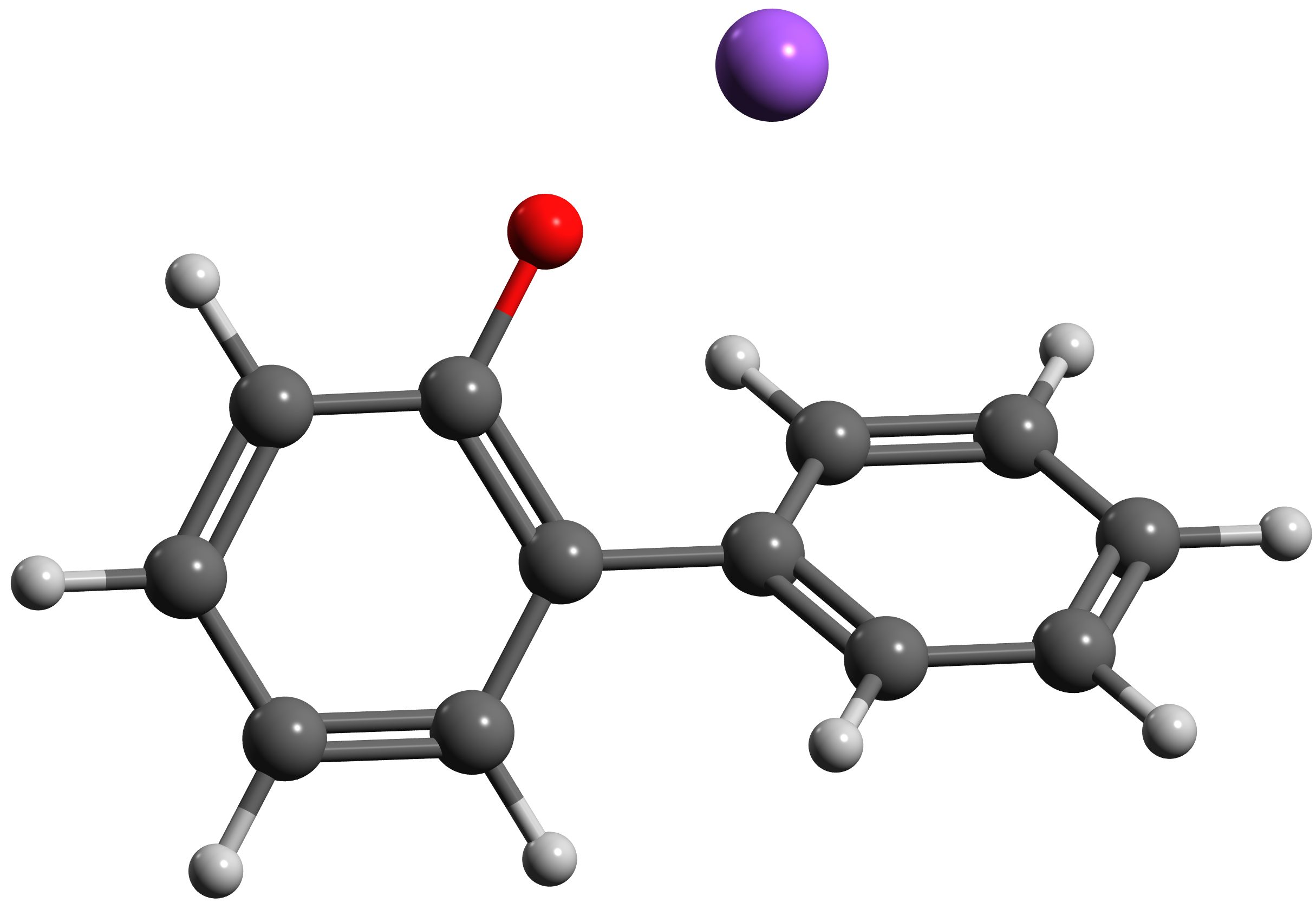

Names
- Preferred IUPAC name Sodium [1,1′-biphenyl]-2-olate
- Other names: (1,1′-Biphenyl)-2-ol, sodium salt; 2-Hydroxydiphenyl sodium; o-Phenylphenol sodium; o-Phenylphenol, sodium; Sodium o-phenylphenol; Sodium 2-phenylphenolate; Sodium o-phenylphenate

Identifiers
CAS Number	132-27-4
3D model (JSmol)	Interactive image
ChEMBL	ChEMBL1903906
ChemSpider	10764729
ECHA InfoCard	100.004.597
E number	E232 (preservatives)
PubChem CID	23675735
UNII	KFV9K7N7UI
CompTox Dashboard (EPA)	DTXSID2021153
- InChI: InChI=1S/C12H10O.Na/c13-12-9-5-4-8-11(12)10-6-2-1-3-7-10;/h1-9,13H;/q;+1 Key: KSQXVLVXUFHGJQ-UHFFFAOYSA-N; InChI=1S/C12H10O.Na/c13-12-9-5-4-8-11(12)10-6-2-1-3-7-10;/h1-9,13H;/q;+1
- SMILES: [O-]C1=C(C2=CC=CC=C2)C=CC=C1.[Na+]

Properties
Chemical formula	C_{12}H_{9}NaO
Molar mass	192.193 g·mol^{−1}
- Except where otherwise noted, data are given for materials in their standard state (at 25 °C [77 °F], 100 kPa). verify (what is ?) Infobox references

Sodium orthophenyl phenol is a compound used as a disinfectant. It is the sodium salt of 2-phenylphenol.

As a food additive, it has E number E232.
