= Sucroglyceride =

Class of chemical compounds used as food additives

Sucroglycerides are substances used in the manufacture of food. They are known in the E number scheme as E474.

== Synopsis ==
Sucroglycerides have been known at least since 1963.

Sucroglycerides are obtained through a reaction between sucrose and an edible oil or fat, and consist of a mixture of mono- and di-esters of sucrose and fatty acids, and mono- and diglycerides. They are immiscible with water, so some solvents may be necessary to produce them. These are limited to dimethyl formamide, cyclohexane, isobutanol, isopropanol and ethyl acetate.

Sucroglycerides are employed as an emulsifier, stabiliser and thickener, and may be used in dairy based drinks, such as chocolate milk, eggnog, drinking yoghurt, beverage whiteners, or in dairy based desserts such as ice cream, yoghurt, sorbets, fruit based desserts, cocoa mixes, chewing gum, rice pudding or tapioca pudding. Processed meat, egg based desserts like custard, soups and broths, sauces also may be treated with sucroglycerides.

Goops and supplements for "weight reduction", infants or youth, "sport" or "electrolyte" drinks, and particulated drinks like cider, fruit wine, mead or spirituous drinks may also be treated with sucroglycerides.
