= Sodium erythorbate =

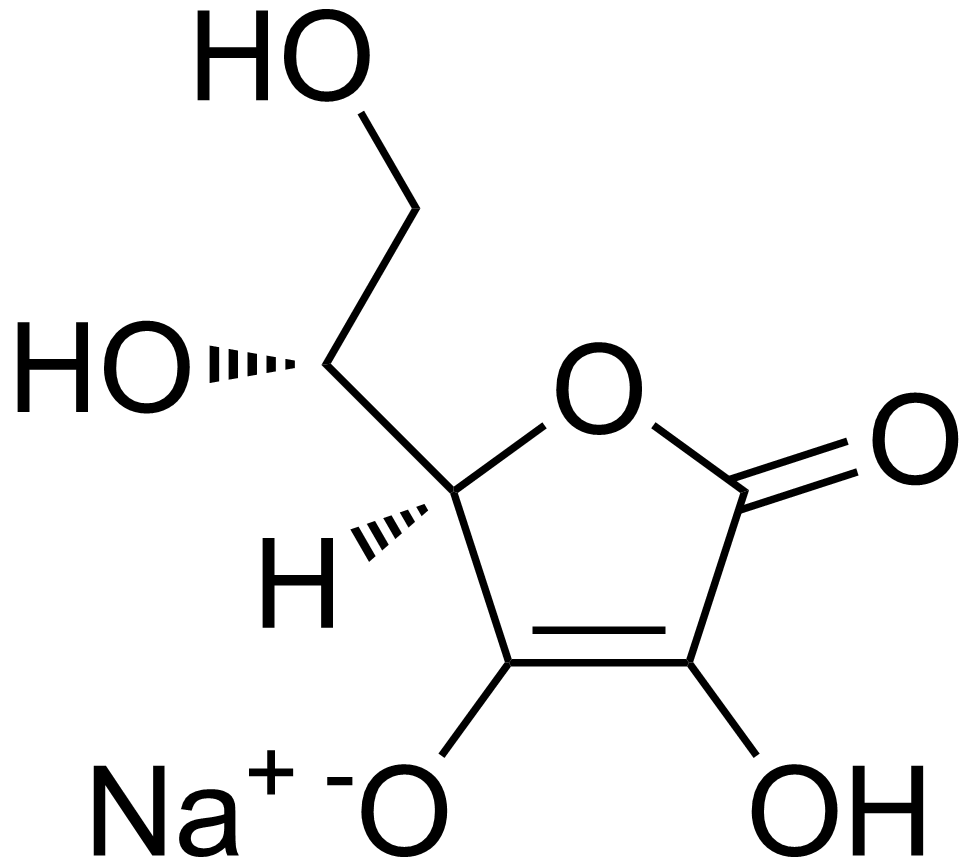
- Sodium erythorbate

Names
- IUPAC name Sodium 1,4-anhydro-1-oxo-D-erythro-hex-2-enitol-3-O-ate
- Systematic IUPAC name Sodium (2R)-2-[(1R)-1,2-dihydroxyethyl]-4-hydroxy-5-oxo-2,5-dihydrofuran-3-olate
- Other names D-isoascorbate; erythorbic acid, sodium salt; E316; araboascorbic acid, monosodium salt, D- (6CI); D-erythro-hex-2-enonic acid, γ-lactone, monosodium salt (8CI,9CI); Erbit N; Eribate N; isoascorbate C sodium; Isona; sodium isoascorbate; sodium D-isoascorbate

Identifiers
CAS Number	6381-77-7
3D model (JSmol)	Interactive image
ChEBI	CHEBI:51438
ChemSpider	16736142
ECHA InfoCard	100.026.340
EC Number	228-973-9
E number	E316 (antioxidants, ...)
PubChem CID	23683938
UNII	BZ468R6XRD
CompTox Dashboard (EPA)	DTXSID5020570
- InChI: InChI=1S/C6H8O6.Na/c7-1-2(8)5-3(9)4(10)6(11)12-5;/h2,5,7-10H,1H2;/q;+1/p-1/t2-,5-;/m1./s1 Key: PPASLZSBLFJQEF-RKJRWTFHSA-M; InChI=1/C6H8O6/c7-1-2(8)5-3(9)4(10)6(11)12-5/h2,5,7-10H,1H2/t2-,5-/m1/s1 Key: CIWBSHSKHKDKBQ-DUZGATOHBV
- SMILES: [Na+].OC[C@@H](O)[C@H]1OC(=O)C(O)=C1[O-]

Properties
Chemical formula	C_{6}H_{7}NaO_{6}
Molar mass	198.11 g/mol
Appearance	White crystalline solid
Density	1.2
Melting point	168 to 170 °C (334 to 338 °F; 441 to 443 K)
Solubility in water	16 g/100 mL

Hazards
NFPA 704 (fire diamond)	1 1 0
- Except where otherwise noted, data are given for materials in their standard state (at 25 °C [77 °F], 100 kPa). verify (what is ?) Infobox references

Sodium erythorbate (C_{6}H_{7}NaO_{6}) is a food additive used predominantly in meats, poultry, and soft drinks. Chemically, it is the sodium salt of erythorbic acid.

== Uses ==
When used in processed meat such as hot dogs, bologna, and beef sticks, it increases the rate at which nitrite reduces to nitric oxide, thus facilitating a faster cure and retaining the pink coloring. As an antioxidant structurally related to vitamin C, it helps improve flavor stability and prevents the formation of carcinogenic nitrosamines. When used as a food additive, its E number is E316.

The use of erythorbic acid and sodium erythorbate as a food preservative has increased greatly since the U.S. Food and Drug Administration banned the use of sulfites as preservatives in foods intended to be eaten fresh (such as ingredients for fresh salads) and as food processors have responded to the fact that some people are allergic to sulfites.

It is occasionally used in beverages, baked goods, and potato salad.

Alternative applications include the development of additives that could be utilized as antioxidants in general. For instance, this substance has been implemented in the development of corrosion inhibitors for metals and it has been implemented in active packaging. Furthermore, sodium erythorbate's antioxidative properties have been shown to reduce the production of thiobarbituric acid reactive substances (TBARS) in frozen meats, effectively increasing their shelf-life.

== Production ==
Sodium erythorbate is produced from sugars derived from different sources, such as beets, sugarcane, and corn. These sugars are converted to ordinary D-glucose. The glucose is converted to a 2-keto sugar acid intermediate, most commonly 2-keto-D-gluconic acid, by Pseudomonas fluorescens bacteria.

An urban myth claims that sodium erythorbate is made from ground earthworms; however, there is no truth to the myth. It is thought that the origin of the legend comes from the similarity of the chemical name to the words earthworm and bait.

== Chemistry ==
Sodium erythorbate is soluble in water. The pH of the aqueous solution of the sodium salt is between 5 and 6. A 10% solution, made from commercial grade sodium erythorbate, may have a pH of 7.2 to 7.9. In its dry, crystalline state it is nonreactive. But, when in solution with water it readily reacts with atmospheric oxygen and other oxidizing agents, which makes it a valuable antioxidant.
