= Orange GGN =

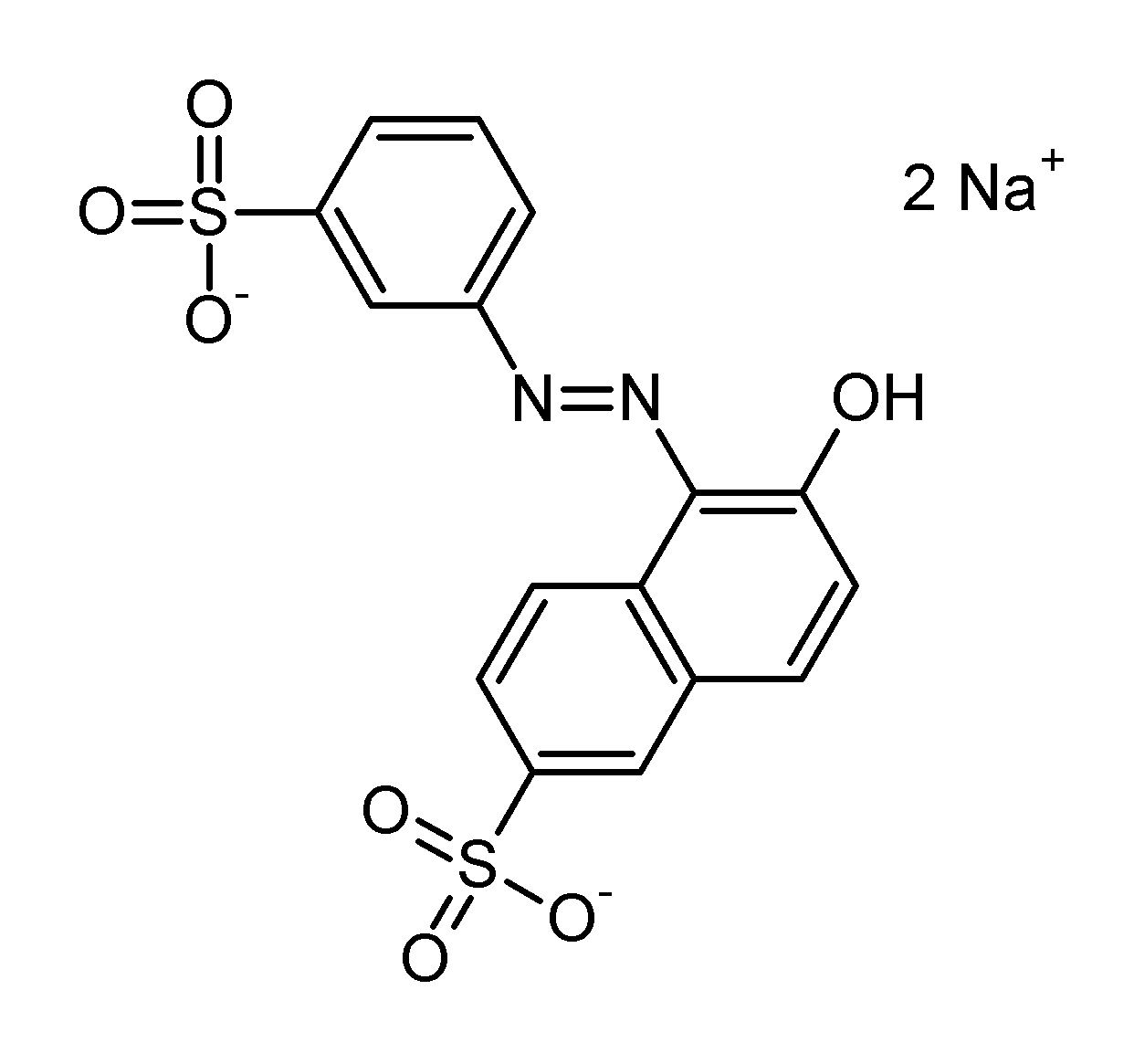

Names
- Other names: 1-(m-Sulfophenylazo)-2-naphthol-6-sulfonic acid, disodium salt; Food Orange 2; C.I. 15980

Identifiers
CAS Number	2347-72-0
3D model (JSmol)	Interactive image
ChemSpider	20152418
ECHA InfoCard	100.017.340
E number	E111 (colours)
PubChem CID	16868
UNII	35HF83708U
CompTox Dashboard (EPA)	DTXSID90893685
- InChI: InChI=1S/C16H12N2O7S2.2Na/c19-15-7-4-10-8-13(27(23,24)25)5-6-14(10)16(15)18-17-11-2-1-3-12(9-11)26(20,21)22;;/h1-9,19H,(H,20,21,22)(H,23,24,25);;/q;2*+1/p-2/b18-17+;; Key: CECHAJXICNIUQL-QIKYXUGXSA-L; InChI=1/C16H12N2O7S2.2Na/c19-15-7-4-10-8-13(27(23,24)25)5-6-14(10)16(15)18-17-11-2-1-3-12(9-11)26(20,21)22;;/h1-9,19H,(H,20,21,22)(H,23,24,25);;/q;2*+1/p-2/b18-17+;; Key: CECHAJXICNIUQL-JLAJEUQUBK
- SMILES: [Na+].[Na+].[O-]S(=O)(=O)c1cccc(c1)/N=N/c2c3ccc(cc3ccc2O)S([O-])(=O)=O

Properties
Chemical formula	C_{16}H_{10}N_{2}Na_{2}O_{7}S_{2}
Molar mass	452.36 g·mol^{−1}
- Except where otherwise noted, data are given for materials in their standard state (at 25 °C [77 °F], 100 kPa). verify (what is ?) Infobox references

Orange GGN, also known as alpha-naphthol orange, is an azo dye formerly used as a food dye. It is the disodium salt of 1-(m-sulfophenylazo)-2-naphthol-6-sulfonic acid. In Europe, it was denoted by the E Number E111, but has been forbidden for use in foods since 1 January 1978. It has never been included in the food additives list of the Codex Alimentarius. As such, it is forbidden for food use in general, because toxicological data has shown it is harmful.

The absorption spectrum of Orange GGN and Sunset Yellow is nearly identical in visible and ultraviolet range, but they can be distinguished by their IR spectra.
