= Brown HT =

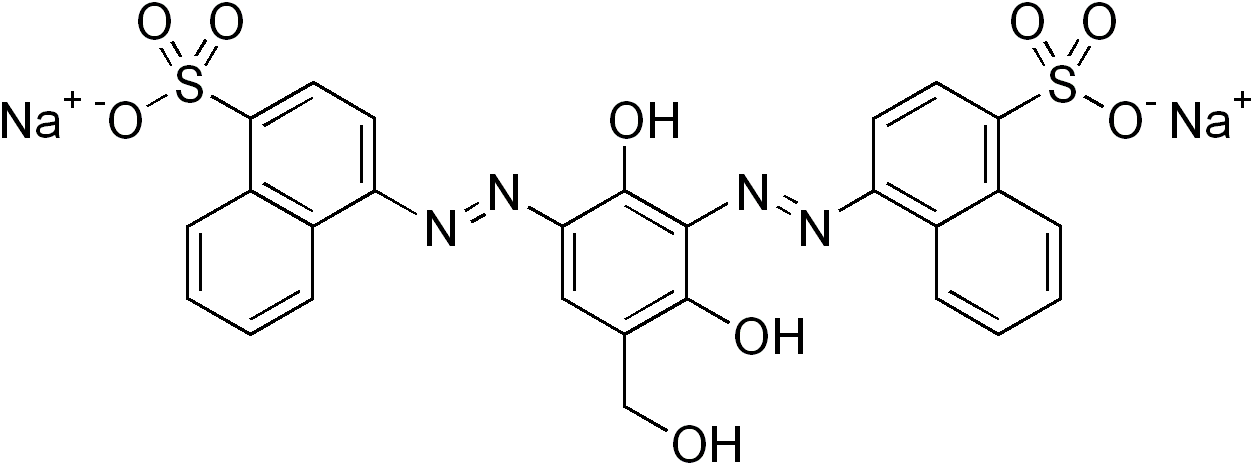

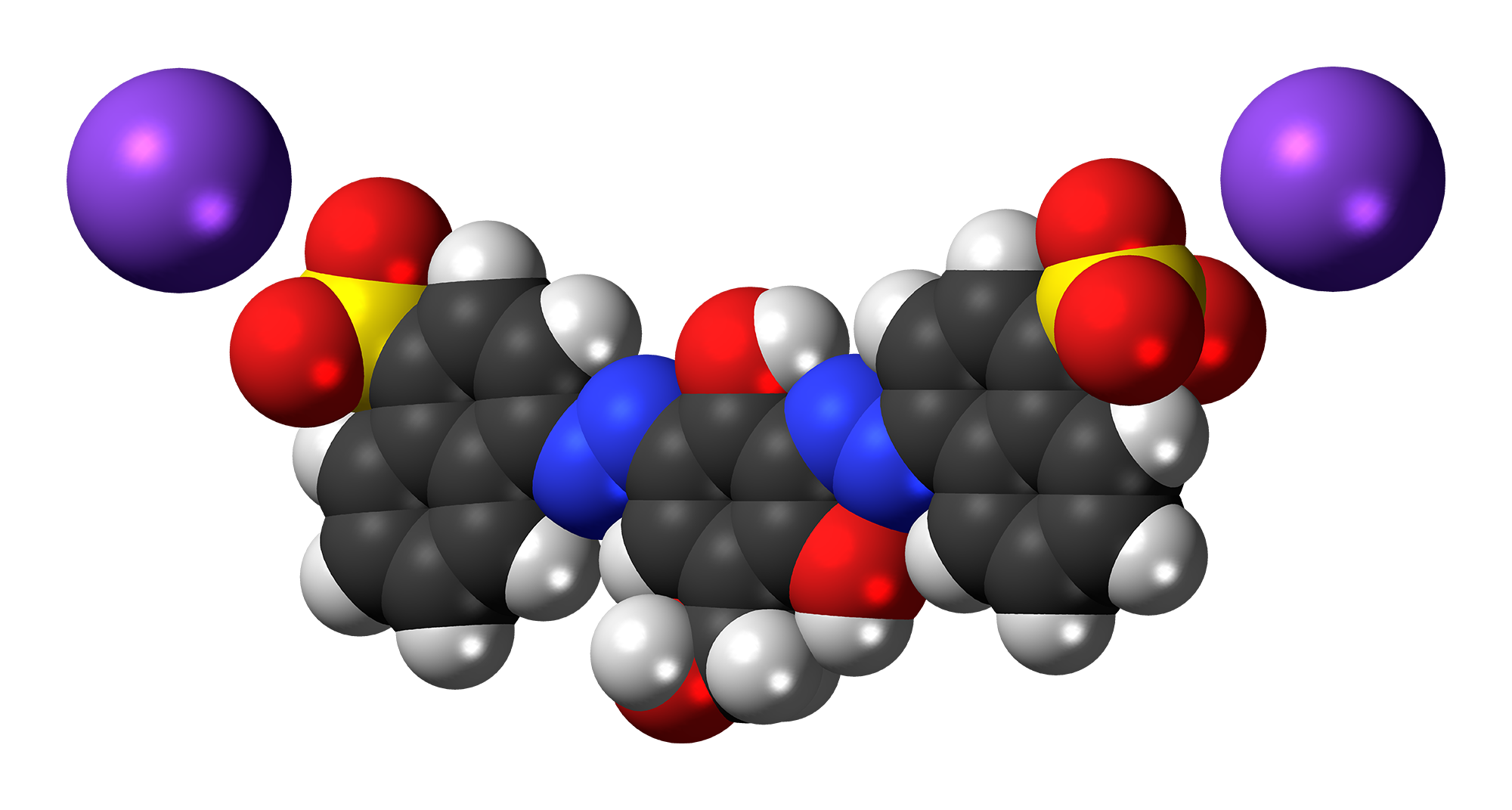

Names
- IUPAC name Disodium 4-[(2E)-2-[(5Z)-3-(hydroxymethyl)-2,6-dioxo-5-[(4-sulfonatonaphthalen-1-yl)hydrazinylidene]-1-cyclohex-3-enylidene]hydrazinyl]naphthalene-1-sulfonate
- Other names: Chocolate Brown HT; Food Brown 3; C.I. 20285, E155

Identifiers
CAS Number	4553-89-3
3D model (JSmol)	Interactive image
ChEMBL	ChEMBL1697823
ChemSpider	21172062
ECHA InfoCard	100.022.659
E number	E155 (colours)
PubChem CID	6536776
UNII	067L3J47ID
CompTox Dashboard (EPA)	DTXSID9020324
- InChI: InChI=1/C27H20N4O9S2.2Na/c32-14-15-13-22(30-28-20-9-11-23(41(35,36)37)18-7-3-1-5-16(18)20)27(34)25(26(15)33)31-29-21-10-12-24(42(38,39)40)19-8-4-2-6-17(19)21;;/h1-13,32-34H,14H2,(H,35,36,37)(H,38,39,40);;/q;2*+1/p-2 Key: BIRIBMFCDVVRKL-NUQVWONBAS
- SMILES: [Na+].[Na+].Oc3c(cc(CO)c(O)c3N=Nc2ccc(c1ccccc12)S([O-])(=O)=O)N=Nc5ccc(c4ccccc45)S([O-])(=O)=O

Properties
Chemical formula	C_{27}H_{18}N_{4}Na_{2}O_{9}S_{2}
Molar mass	652.56 g/mol
- Except where otherwise noted, data are given for materials in their standard state (at 25 °C [77 °F], 100 kPa). Infobox references

Brown HT, also called Chocolate Brown HT, Food Brown 3, and C.I. 20285, is a brown synthetic coal tar diazo dye.

When used as a food dye, its E number is E155. It is used to substitute cocoa or caramel as a colorant. It is used mainly in chocolate cakes, but can also be found in desserts, cookies, candy, cheeses, teas, yogurts, jams, chocolate drinks, ice creams, fruit products, fish, wafers, breakfast cereals, and other products.

It is approved for use by the European Union. It is banned in Australia, Austria, Belgium, Denmark, France, Germany, Norway, Sweden, Switzerland, Russia and the United States.
