= Scarlet GN =

- Kekulé, canonical skeletal formula of scarlet GN ((6E)-6-hydrazinylidene)

Names
- Systematic IUPAC name Disodium 3-[(2,4-Dimethyl-5-sulfonatophenyl)hydrazinylidene]-4-oxonaphthalene-1-sulfonate
- Other names: Crimson 4R; C.I. Food Red 1; Food red 1; FD & C Red no. 4; Hexacol Ponceau SX; Maple Ponceau SX; Ponceau SX; Purple 4R; E125

Identifiers
CAS Number	4548-53-2 (Z)
3D model (JSmol)	Interactive image; Interactive image
ChemSpider	5020702 (Z)
ECHA InfoCard	100.019.870
EC Number	221-856-3
E number	E125 (colours)
PubChem CID	6537642 (Z); 5483118 (E)
UNII	X3W0AM1JLX
CompTox Dashboard (EPA)	DTXSID9062938
- InChI: InChI=1S/C18H16N2O7S2.2Na/c1-10-8-11(2)17(16(9-10)29(25,26)27)20-19-14-7-6-12-13(18(14)21)4-3-5-15(12)28(22,23)24;;/h3-9,20H,1-2H3,(H,22,23,24)(H,25,26,27);;/q;2*+1/p-2/b19-14-;; Key: AQJHOKDCKYSJAS-MHZTUVSFSA-L
- SMILES: [Na+].Cc3cc(S(=O)(=O)[O-])c(N=Nc2c(O)c1c(cc2)c(S(=O)(=O)[O-])ccc1)c(C)c3.[Na+]; CC1=CC(=C(NN=C2C=CC3=C(C=CC=C3C2=O)S(=O)(=O)O[Na])C(C)=C1)S(=O)(=O)O[Na]

Properties
Chemical formula	C_{18}H_{14}N_{2}Na_{2}O_{7}S_{2}
Molar mass	480.42 g·mol^{−1}
- Except where otherwise noted, data are given for materials in their standard state (at 25 °C [77 °F], 100 kPa). verify (what is ?) Infobox references

Scarlet GN, or C.I. Food Red 2, FD&C Red No. 4, or C.I. 14815 is a red azo dye once used as a food dye. As a food additive, it has the E number E125, although it is banned in Europe. It is usually used as a disodium salt.

== Preparation ==
To synthesize Food Red 2, 2,4-dimethylaniline-6-sulfonic acid is diazotized with sodium nitrite and hydrochloric acid Diazotization. The resulting diazonium salt is reacted with 5-hydroxynaphthalene-1-sulfonic acid via azo coupling.

== Use ==
Originally, Food Red 2 was used as a food colorant. Under the designation E 125, Food Red 2 was approved as a food colorant in the EU by Directive 62/2645/EEC until the end of 1976.

Food Red 2 is mainly used as a colorant in cosmetics (shampoos, bubble bath, liquid soaps). It is approved in the EU by Regulation (EC) No. 1223/2009. The colorant is also approved for cosmetics in South Africa, Turkey, and Thailand, whereas in Japan and the USA it may not be used in food, pharmaceuticals, or cosmetics.

In the United States, it is not permitted for use in food or ingested drugs and may only be used in externally applied drugs and cosmetics, due to potential carcinogenic effects from ingesting it. An exception was added in 1965 to allow its use in the coloring of maraschino cherries, which were considered mainly decorative and not a foodstuff. This exception was repealed and the dye banned in the US on September 22, 1976 due to mounting safety concerns. In the European Union, it is not permitted as a food additive.
