= 2-Phenylphenol =

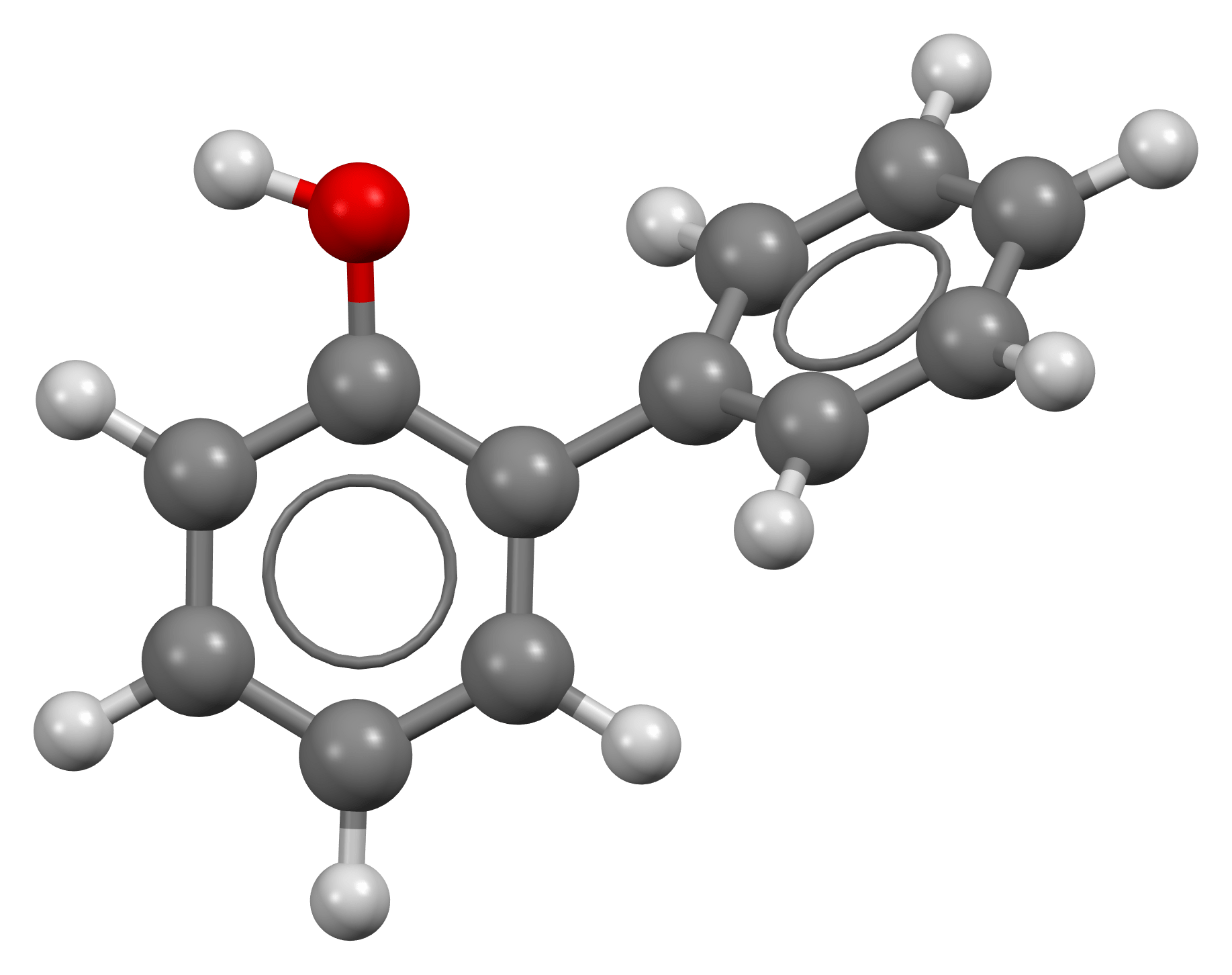
- Ball-and-stick model of 2-Phenylphenol

Names
- Preferred IUPAC name [1,1′-Biphenyl]-2-ol
- Other names: 2-Phenylphenol; 2-Biphenylol; o-Phenylphenol; Biphenylol; 2-Hydroxybiphenyl; Orthophenyl phenol; o-Xenol; Orthoxenol

Identifiers
| CAS Number | 90-43-7 |
| 3D model (JSmol) | Interactive image |
| ChEBI | CHEBI:17043 |
| ChEMBL | ChEMBL108829 |
| ChemSpider | 13839012 |
| ECHA InfoCard | 100.001.812 |
| EC Number | 201-993-5 |
| E number | E231 (preservatives) |
| KEGG | D08367 |
| PubChem CID | 7017 |
| RTECS number | DV5775000 |
| UNII | D343Z75HT8 |
| UN number | 3077 |
| CompTox Dashboard (EPA) | DTXSID2021151 |
- InChI: InChI=1S/C12H10O/c13-12-9-5-4-8-11(12)10-6-2-1-3-7-10/h1-9,13H Key: LLEMOWNGBBNAJR-UHFFFAOYSA-N; InChI=1/C12H10O/c13-12-9-5-4-8-11(12)10-6-2-1-3-7-10/h1-9,13H Key: LLEMOWNGBBNAJR-UHFFFAOYAF
- SMILES: Oc2ccccc2c1ccccc1

Properties
| Chemical formula | C_{12}H_{10}O |
| Molar mass | 170.211 g·mol^{−1} |
| Density | 1.293 g/cm^{3} |
| Melting point | 55.5 to 57.5 °C (131.9 to 135.5 °F; 328.6 to 330.6 K) |
| Boiling point | 280 to 284 °C (536 to 543 °F; 553 to 557 K) |

Pharmacology
| ATC code | D08AE06 (WHO) |

Hazards
- GHS labelling
| Pictograms | (GHS07: Exclamation mark) (GHS09: Environmental hazard) |
| Signal word | Warning |
| Hazard statements | H315, H319, H335, H400 |
| Precautionary statements | P261, P264, P264+P265, P271, P273, P280, P302+P352, P304+P340, P305+P351+P338, P319, P321, P332+P317, P337+P317, P362+P364, P391, P403+P233, P405, P501 |
- Except where otherwise noted, data are given for materials in their standard state (at 25 °C [77 °F], 100 kPa). verify (what is ?) Infobox references

2-Phenylphenol, or o-phenylphenol, is an organic compound with the formula C_{6}H_{5}−C_{6}H_{4}OH. It is one of three isomers of monohydroxylated biphenyl. It is a white solid. It is a biocide used as a preservative with E number E231 and under the trade names Dowicide, Torsite, Fungal, Preventol, Nipacide and many others.

== Uses ==
The primary use of 2-phenylphenol is as an agricultural fungicide. It is generally applied post-harvest as a fungicide used for waxing citrus fruits.

It is also used for disinfection of seed boxes. It is a general surface disinfectant, used in households, hospitals, nursing homes, farms, laundries, barber shops, and food processing plants. It can be used on fibers and other materials. It is used to disinfect hospital and veterinary equipment. Other uses are in rubber industry and as a laboratory reagent. It is also used in the manufacture of other fungicides, dye stuffs, resins and rubber chemicals. The sodium salt of orthophenyl phenol, sodium orthophenyl phenol, is a preservative, used to treat the surface of citrus fruits.

2-Phenylphenol is a precursor to 9,10-dihydro-9-oxa-10-phosphaphenanthrene-10-oxide, a commercial fire retardant.

== Preparation ==
It can be prepared by condensation of cyclohexanone to give cyclohexenylcyclohexanone. The latter undergoes dehydrogenation to give 2-phenylphenol. Another route, it is a significant and recovered by product of the reaction of chlorobenzene with alkali which primarily gives phenol.

== Safety ==
LD50 (rats) is 2700 to 3000 mg/kg. 2-Phenylphenol is no longer a permitted food additive in the European Union but is still allowed as a post-harvest treatment in 4 EU countries. As a fungicide in food packaging orthophenyl phenol may migrate into the contents.
