= Octyl gallate =

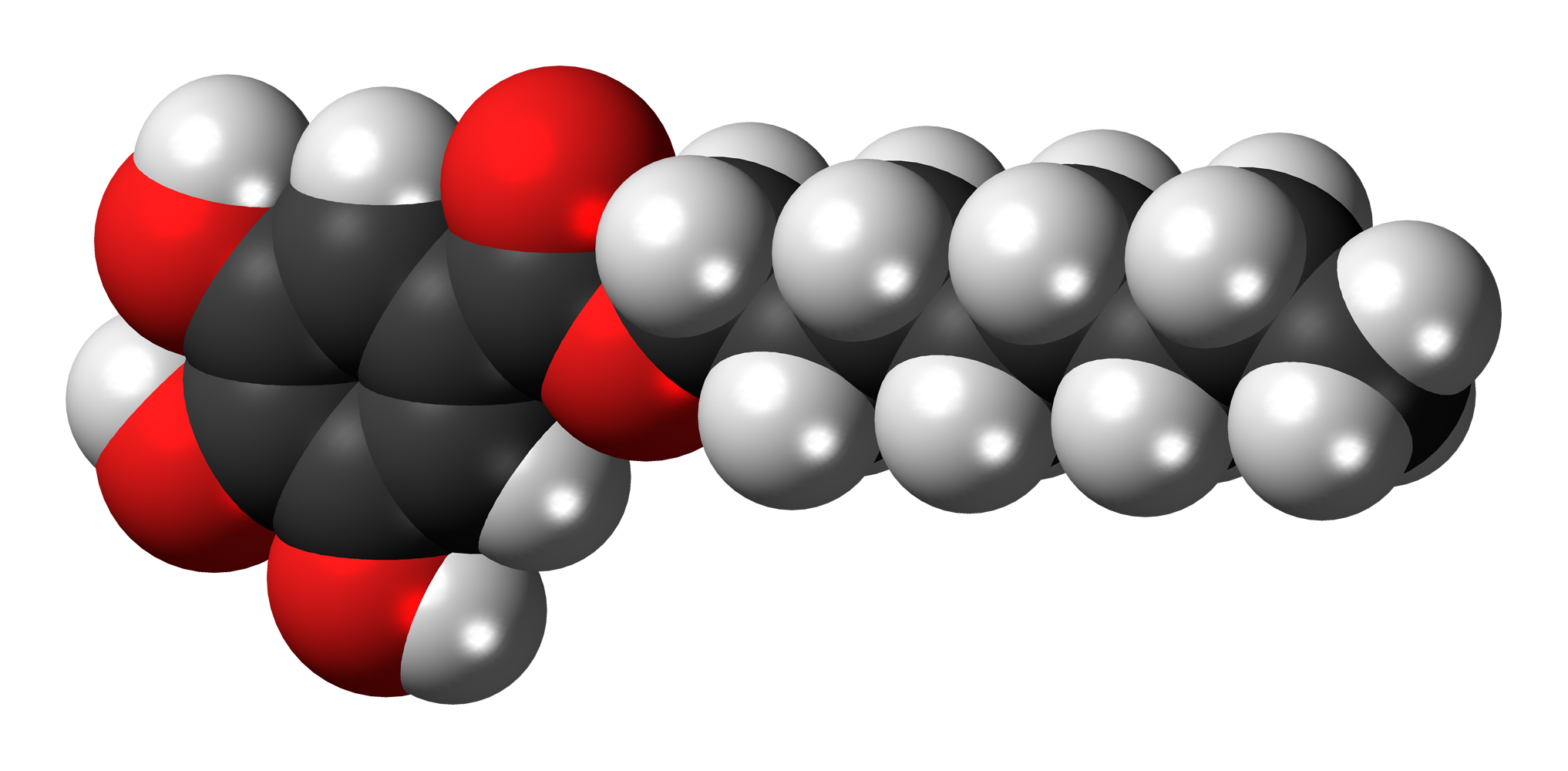

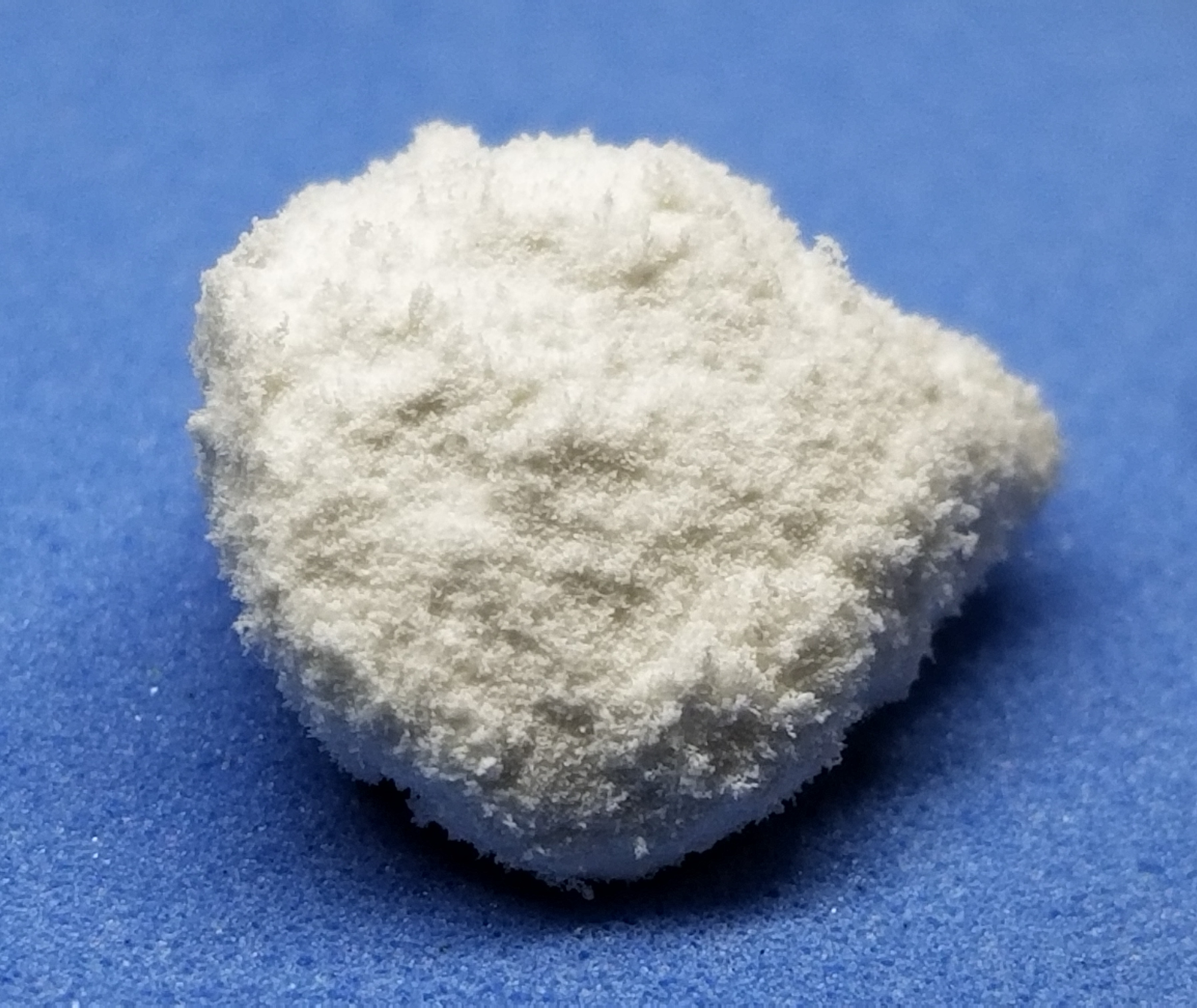

Names
- Preferred IUPAC name Octyl 3,4,5-trihydroxybenzoate
- Other names E311; Progallin O; n-Ocyl gallate; Stabilizer GA-8; Gallic acid octyl ester; 3,4,5-Trihydroxybenzoic acid octyl ester

Identifiers
CAS Number	1034-01-1
3D model (JSmol)	Interactive image
ChEBI	CHEBI:83631
ChEMBL	ChEMBL277346
ChemSpider	55194
ECHA InfoCard	100.012.594
EC Number	213-853-0
E number	E311 (antioxidants, ...)
PubChem CID	61253
UNII	079IIA2811
CompTox Dashboard (EPA)	DTXSID4040713
- InChI: InChI=1S/C15H22O5/c1-2-3-4-5-6-7-8-20-15(19)11-9-12(16)14(18)13(17)10-11/h9-10,16-18H,2-8H2,1H3 Key: NRPKURNSADTHLJ-UHFFFAOYSA-N; InChI=1/C15H22O5/c1-2-3-4-5-6-7-8-20-15(19)11-9-12(16)14(18)13(17)10-11/h9-10,16-18H,2-8H2,1H3 Key: NRPKURNSADTHLJ-UHFFFAOYAL
- SMILES: CCCCCCCCOC(=O)C1=CC(O)(=C(C(=C1)O)O)

Properties
Chemical formula	C_{15}H_{22}O_{5}
Molar mass	282.336 g·mol^{−1}
Appearance	White solid
Melting point	98 to 101 °C (208 to 214 °F; 371 to 374 K)

Hazards
- GHS labelling
Pictograms	(GHS07: Exclamation mark)
Signal word	Warning
Hazard statements	H302, H317
Precautionary statements	P261, P264, P270, P272, P280, P301+P312, P302+P352, P321, P330, P333+P313, P363, P501
- Except where otherwise noted, data are given for materials in their standard state (at 25 °C [77 °F], 100 kPa). verify (what is ?) Infobox references

Octyl gallate is the ester of 1-octanol and gallic acid. As a food additive, it is used under the E number E311 as an antioxidant and preservative.

== Properties ==
Octyl gallate is a white powder with a characteristic odor. It is very slightly soluble in water and soluble in alcohol. Its solubility in lard is 1.1%. Octyl gallate darkens in the presence of iron.

== Uses ==
This antioxidant is used in numerous pharmaceutical, cosmetic, and food products; such as soaps, shampoos, shaving soaps, skin lotions, deodorants, margarine, and peanut butter.

It is a synergistic antioxidant with butylated hydroxytoluene (BHT) and butylated hydroxyanisole (BHA).
