= Dodecyl gallate =

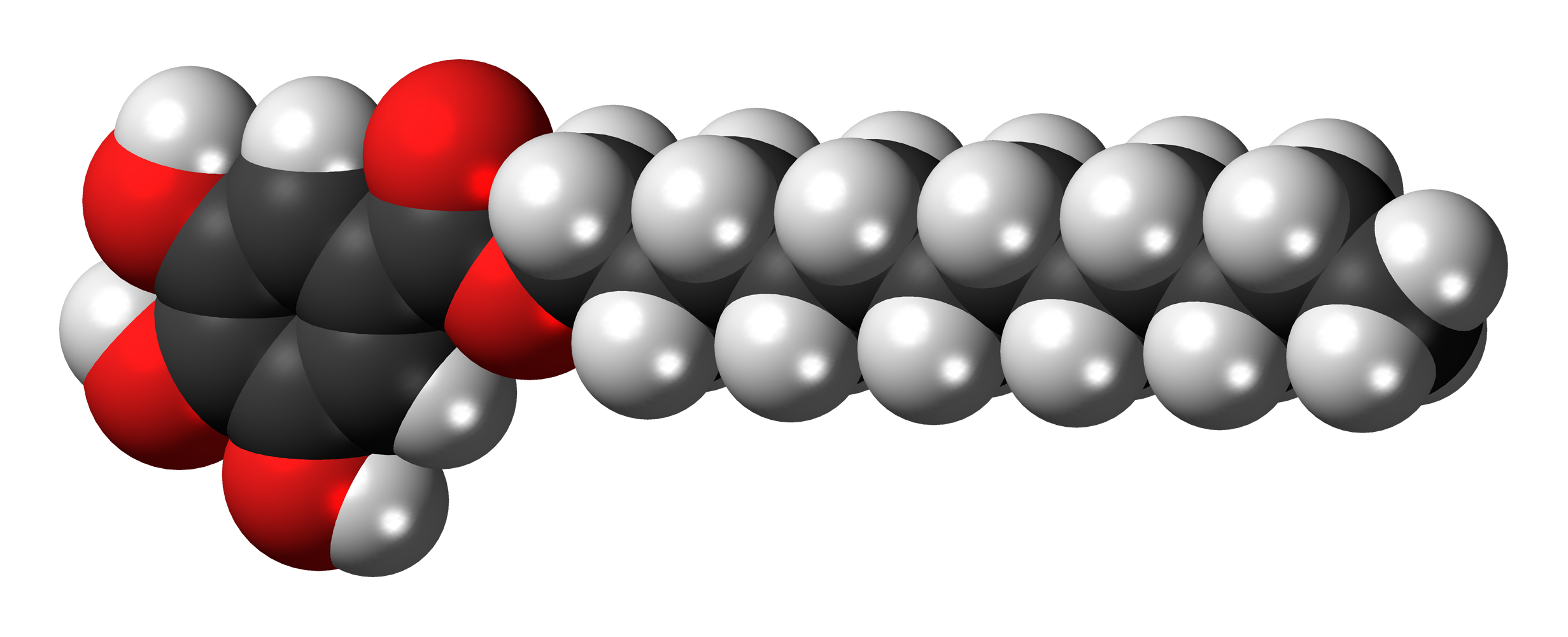

Names
- Preferred IUPAC name Dodecyl 3,4,5-trihydroxybenzoate
- Other names Lauryl gallate E312

Identifiers
CAS Number	1166-52-5
3D model (JSmol)	Interactive image
ChEMBL	ChEMBL16121
ChemSpider	13777
ECHA InfoCard	100.013.291
E number	E312 (antioxidants, ...)
PubChem CID	14425
UNII	45612DY463
CompTox Dashboard (EPA)	DTXSID0048189
- InChI: InChI=1S/C19H30O5/c1-2-3-4-5-6-7-8-9-10-11-12-24-19(23)15-13-16(20)18(22)17(21)14-15/h13-14,20-22H,2-12H2,1H3 Key: RPWFJAMTCNSJKK-UHFFFAOYSA-N; InChI=1/C19H30O5/c1-2-3-4-5-6-7-8-9-10-11-12-24-19(23)15-13-16(20)18(22)17(21)14-15/h13-14,20-22H,2-12H2,1H3 Key: RPWFJAMTCNSJKK-UHFFFAOYAC
- SMILES: CCCCCCCCCCCCOC(=O)C1=CC(=C(C(=C1)O)O)O

Properties
Chemical formula	C_{19}H_{30}O_{5}
Molar mass	338.44 g/mol
- Except where otherwise noted, data are given for materials in their standard state (at 25 °C [77 °F], 100 kPa). verify (what is ?) Infobox references

Dodecyl gallate, or lauryl gallate, is the ester of dodecanol and gallic acid. As a food additive it is used under the E number E312 as an antioxidant and preservative.
