= List of food additives =

Food additives are substances added to food to preserve flavor or enhance its taste, appearance, or other qualities.

== Purposes ==
Additives are used for many purposes but the main uses are:

Acids
Food acids are added to make flavors "sharper", and also act as preservatives and antioxidants. Common food acids include vinegar, citric acid, tartaric acid, malic acid, folic acid, fumaric acid, and lactic acid.
Acidity regulators
Acidity regulators are used to change or otherwise control the acidity and alkalinity of foods.
Anticaking agents
Anticaking agents keep powders such as milk powder from caking or sticking.
Antifoaming agents
Antifoaming agents reduce or prevent foaming in foods.
Antioxidants
Antioxidants such as vitamin C act as preservatives by inhibiting the effects of oxygen on food, and can be beneficial to health.
Bulking agents
Bulking agents such as starch are additives that increase the bulk of a food without affecting its nutritional value.
Food coloring
Colorings are added to food to replace colors lost during preparation, or to make food look more attractive.
Color retention agents
In contrast to colorings, color retention agents are used to preserve a food's existing color.
Emulsifiers
Emulsifiers allow water and oils to remain mixed together in an emulsion, as in mayonnaise, ice cream, and homogenized milk.
Flavors
Flavors are additives that give food a particular taste or smell, and may be derived from natural ingredients or created artificially.
Flavor enhancers
Flavor enhancers enhance a food's existing flavors. They may be extracted from natural sources (through distillation, solvent extraction, maceration, among other methods) or created artificially.
Flour treatment agents
Flour treatment agents are added to flour to improve its color or its use in baking.
Glazing agents
Glazing agents provide a shiny appearance or protective coating to foods.
Humectants
Humectants prevent foods from drying out.
Tracer gas
Tracer gas allow for package integrity testing to prevent foods from being exposed to atmosphere, thus guaranteeing shelf life.
Preservatives
Preservatives prevent or inhibit spoilage of food due to fungi, bacteria and other microorganisms.
Stabilizers
Stabilizers, thickeners and gelling agents, like agar or pectin (used in jam for example) give foods a firmer texture. While they are not true emulsifiers, they help to stabilize emulsions.
Sweeteners
Sweeteners are added to foods for flavoring. Sweeteners other than sugar are added to keep the food energy (calories) low, or because they have beneficial effects for diabetes mellitus and tooth decay.
Thickeners
Thickeners are substances which, when added to the mixture, increase its viscosity without substantially modifying its other properties.

Caffeine and other GRAS (generally recognized as safe) additives such as sugar and salt are not required to go through the regulation process.

== 0–9 ==
- 1,4-heptonolactone – food acid *
- 2-hydroxybiphenyl – preservative

== A ==
- Abietic acid –
- Acacia vera –
- Acacia – thickener, emulsifier, and stabilizer
- Acesulfame potassium – artificial sweetener
- Acesulfame –
- Acetic acid – acidity regulator
- Acetic acid esters of mono- and diglycerides of fatty acids – emulsifier
- Acetone –
- Acetylated distarch adipate – thickener, vegetable gum
- Acetylated distarch phosphate – thickener, vegetable gum
- Acetylated oxidised starch – thickener, vegetable gum
- Acetylated starch – thickener, vegetable gum
- Acid treated starch – thickener, vegetable gum
- Adipic acid – food acid
- Agar – thickener, vegetable gum, stabilizer, gelling agent
- Alcohol –
- Alfalfa –
- Alginic acid – thickener, vegetable gum, stabilizer, gelling agent, emulsifier
- Alitame – artificial sweetener
- Alkaline treated starch – thickener, vegetable gum
- Alkanet – color (red)
- Allspice –
- Allura red AC – color (FDA: FD&C Red #40)
- Almond oil – used as a substitute for olive oil. Also used as an emollient.
- Aluminium – color (silver)
- Aluminium ammonium sulfate – mineral salt
- Aluminium potassium sulfate – mineral salt
- Aluminium silicate – anti-caking agent
- Aluminium sodium sulfate – mineral salt
- Aluminium sulfate – mineral salt
- Amaranth – color (red) (FDA: [DELISTED] Red #2) Note that amaranth dye is unrelated to the amaranth plant
- Amaranth oil – high in squalene and unsaturated fatty acids – used in food and cosmetic industries.
- Amchur (mango powder) –
- Ammonium acetate – preservative, acidity regulator
- Ammonium adipates – acidity regulator
- Ammonium alginate – thickener, vegetable gum, stabilizer, gelling agent, emulsifier
- Ammonium bicarbonate – mineral salt
- Ammonium carbonate – mineral salt
- Ammonium chloride – mineral salt
- Ammonium ferric citrate – food acid
- Ammonium fumarate – food acid
- Ammonium hydroxide – mineral salt
- Ammonium lactate – food acid
- Ammonium malate – food acid
- Ammonium phosphates – mineral salt
- Ammonium phosphatides – emulsifier
- Ammonium polyphosphates – anti-caking agent
- Ammonium sulfate – mineral salt, improving agent
- Amylases – flour treatment agent
- Angelica (Angelica archangelica) –
- Anise –
- Annatto – color
- Anthocyanins – color
- Apricot oil – a cooking oil from certain cultivars.
- Arabinogalactan – thickener, vegetable gum
- Argan oil – a food oil from Morocco that has also attracted recent attention in Europe.
- Argon – propellant
- Rocket (Arugula) –
- Asafoetida –
- Ascorbic acid (Vitamin C) – antioxidant (water-soluble)
- Ascorbyl palmitate – antioxidant (fat soluble)
- Ascorbyl stearate – antioxidant (fat soluble)
- Aspartame – artificial sweetener
- Aspartame-acesulfame salt – artificial sweetener
- Astaxanthin – color
- Avocado oil – used a substitute for olive oil. Also used in cosmetics and skin care products.
- Azodicarbonamide – flour bleaching agent. Also used in the production of foamed plastics and the manufacture of gaskets. Banned as a food additive in Australia and Europe.
- Azorubine – color (red) (FDA: Ext D&C Red #10)

== B ==
- Babassu oil – similar to, and used as a substitute for coconut oil.
- Baking powder – leavening agent; includes acid and base
- Baking soda – food base
- Balm, lemon –
- Balm oil –
- Balsam of Peru – used in food and drink for flavoring
- Barberry –
- Barley flour –
- Basil (Ocimum basilicum) –
- Basil extract –
- Bay leaves –
- Beeswax – glazing agent
- Beet red – color (red)
- Beetroot red – color (red)
- Ben oil – extracted from the seeds of the moringa oleifera. High in behenic acid. Extremely stable edible oil. Also suitable for biofuel.
- Bentonite – anti-caking agent
- Benzoic acid – preservative
- Benzoyl peroxide – flour treatment agent
- Berebere –
- Bergamot – in Earl Grey tea
- Beta-apo-8'-carotenal (C 30) – color
- Beta-apo-8'-carotenic acid ethyl ester – color
- Betanin – color (red)
- Biphenyl – preservative
- Bison grass (Hierochloe odorata) –
- Bixin – color
- Black 7984 – color (brown and black)
- Black cardamom –
- Black cumin –
- Blackcurrant seed oil – used as a food supplement, because of high content of omega-3 and omega-6 fatty acids. Also used in cosmetics.
- Black limes –
- Pepper (black, white, and green) –
- Black PN – color (brown and black)
- Bleached starch – thickener, vegetable gum
- Bolivian Coriander (Porophyllum ruderale) –
- Bone phosphate – anti-caking agent
- Borage (Borago officinalis) –
- Borage seed oil – similar to blackcurrant seed oil – used primarily medicinally.
- Borax –
- Boric acid – preservative
- Brilliant Black BN- color (brown and black)
- Brilliant blue FCF – color (FDA: FD&C Blue #1)
- Brilliant Scarlet 4R – color (FDA: Ext D&C Red #8)
- Brominated vegetable oil – emulsifier, stabiliser
- Brown FK – color (brown and black)
- Bush tomato –
- Butane – propellant
- Butylated hydroxyanisole (BHA) – antioxidant (fat soluble)
- Butylated hydroxytoluene (BHT) – antioxidant (fat soluble)

== C ==
- Cacao shell –
- Cachou extract –
- Cactus root extract –
- Cadinene –
- Caffeine – stimulant
- Cajeput oil –
- Calamus –
- Calcium 5'-ribonucleotides – flavor enhancer
- Calcium acetate – preservative, acidity regulator
- Calcium alginate – thickener, vegetable gum, stabilizer, gelling agent, emulsifier
- Calcium ascorbate – antioxidant (water-soluble)
- Calcium aluminosilicate (calcium aluminium silicate) – anti-caking agent
- Calcium ascorbate (Vitamin C) –
- Calcium benzoate – preservative
- Calcium bisulfite – preservative, antioxidant
- Calcium carbonates – color (white), anticaking agent, stabiliser
- Calcium chloride – mineral salt
- Calcium citrates – food acid, firming agent
- Calcium diglutamate – flavor enhancer
- Calcium disodium EDTA – preservative
- Calcium ferrocyanide – anti-caking agent
- Calcium formate – preservative
- Calcium fumarate – food acid
- Calcium gluconate – acidity regulator
- Calcium guanylate – flavor enhancer
- Calcium hydrogen sulfite – preservative, antioxidant
- Calcium hydroxide – mineral salt
- Calcium inosinate – flavor enhancer
- Calcium lactate – food acid
- Calcium lactobionate – stabilizer
- Calcium malates – food acid
- Calcium oxide – mineral salt
- Calcium pantothenate (Vitamin B_{5}) –
- Calcium peroxide –
- Calcium phosphates – mineral salt, anti-caking agent, firming agent
- Calcium polyphosphates – anti-caking agent
- Calcium propionate – preservative
- Calcium salts of fatty acids – emulsifier, stabiliser, anti-caking agent
- Calcium silicate – anti-caking agent
- Calcium sorbate – preservative
- Calcium stearoyl lactylate – emulsifier
- Calcium sulfate – flour treatment agent, mineral salt, sequestrant, improving agent, firming agent
- Calcium sulfite – preservative, antioxidant
- Calcium tartrate – food acid, emulsifier
- Camomile –
- Candelilla wax – glazing agent
- Candle nut –
- Canola oil/Rapeseed oil – one of the most widely used cooking oils, from a (trademarked) cultivar of rapeseed
- Canthaxanthin – color
- Caper (Capparis spinosa) –
- Caprylic acid - preservative
- Capsanthin – color
- Capsorubin – color
- Carrageenan – A family of linear sulphated polysaccharides extracted from red seaweeds.
- Caramel I (plain) – color (brown and black)
- Caramel II (Caustic Sulfite process) – color (brown and black)
- Caramel III (Ammonia process) – color (brown and black)
- Caramel IV (Ammonia sulfite process) – color (brown and black)
- Caraway –
- Carbamide – flour treatment agent
- Carbon black – color (brown and black)
- Carbon dioxide – acidity regulator, propellant
- Cardamom –
- carmines – color (red)
- Carmoisine – color (red) (FDA: Ext D&C Red #10)
- Carnauba wax – glazing agent
- Carob pod –
- Carob pod oil/Algaroba oil – used medicinally
- Carotenes – color
  - Alpha-carotene – color
  - Beta-carotene – color
  - Gamma-carotene – color
- Carrageenan – thickener, vegetable gum, stabilizer, gelling agent, emulsifier
- Carrot oil –
- Cashew oil – somewhat comparable to olive oil. May have value for fighting dental cavities.
- Cassia –
- Catechu extract –
- Celery salt –
- Celery seed –
- Wheat germ oil – used as a food supplement, and for its "grainy" flavor. Also used medicinally. Highly unstable.
- Chalk – color (white), anticaking agent, stabiliser
- Chervil (Anthriscus cerefolium) –
- Chicory –
- Chicory Root Extract – High in Inulin
- Chile pepper –
- Chili powder –
- Chives (Allium schoenoprasum) –
- Chlorine dioxide – flour treatment agent
- Chlorine – flour treatment agent
- Chlorophylls and Chlorophyllins – color (green)
- Chocolate Brown HT – color
- Choline salts and esters – emulsifier
- Chrysoine resorcinol – color (red)
- Cicely (Myrrhis odorata) –
- Sweet cicely (Myrrhis odorata) –
- Cilantro (see Coriander) (Coriandrum sativum) –
- Cinnamon –
- Cinnamon oil – used for flavoring.
- Citranaxanthin – color
- Citric acid – food acid
- Citric acid esters of mono- and diglycerides of fatty acids – emulsifier
- Citrus red 2 – color (red)
- Cloves –
- Cochineal – color (red)
- Coconut oil – a cooking oil, high in saturated fat – particularly used in baking and cosmetics.
- Sage (Salvia officinalis) –
- Copper complexes of chlorophylls – color (green)
- Coriander –
- Coriander seed oil – used medicinally. Also used as a flavoring agent in pharmaceutical and food industries.
- Corn oil – one of the most common, and inexpensive cooking oils.
- Corn syrup –
- Cottonseed oil – a major food oil, often used in industrial food processing.
- Cress –
- Crocetin – color
- Crocin – color
- Crosslinked Sodium carboxymethylcellulose – emulsifier
- Cryptoxanthin – color
- Cumin –
- Cumin oil/Black seed oil – used as a flavor, particularly in meat products. Also used in veterinary medicine.
- Cupric sulfate – mineral salt
- Curcumin – color (yellow and orange)
- Curry powder –
- Curry leaf (Murraya koenigii) –
- Cyanocobalamin (Vitamin B12) –
- Cyclamates – artificial sweetener
- Cyclamic acid – artificial sweetener
- beta-cyclodextrin – emulsifier
- Lemongrass (Cymbopogon citratus, C. flexuosus, and other species) –

== D ==
- Damiana (Turnera aphrodisiaca, T. diffusa) –
- Dandelion leaf –
- Dandelion Root –
- Dandelion (Taraxacum officinale) –
- Decanal dimethyl acetal –
- Decanal –
- Decanoic acid –
- Dehydroacetic acid – preservative
- Delta-tocopherol(synthetic) – antioxidant
- Devil's claw (Harpagophytum procumbens)– medicinal
- Dextrin roasted starch – thickener, vegetable gum
- Diacetyltartaric acid esters of mono- and diglycerides of fatty acids – emulsifier
- Dicalcium diphosphate – anti-caking agent
- Dilauryl thiodipropionate – antioxidant
- Dill seed –
- Dill (Anethum graveolens) –
- Dimethyl dicarbonate – preservative
- Dimethylpolysiloxane – emulsifier, anti-caking agent
- Dioctyl sodium sulfosuccinate – emulsifier
- Diphenyl – preservative
- Diphosphates – mineral salt, emulsifier
- Dipotassium guanylate – flavor enhancer
- Dipotassium inosinate – flavor enhancer
- Disodium 5'-ribonucleotides – flavor enhancer
- Disodium ethylenediaminetetraacetate – antioxidant, preservative
- Disodium guanylate – flavor enhancer
- Disodium inosinate – flavor enhancer
- Distarch phosphate – thickener, vegetable gum
- Distearyl thiodipropionate – antioxidant
- Dl-alpha-tocopherol (synthetic) – antioxidant
- Dodecyl gallate – antioxidant

== E ==
- Echinacea –
- EDTA – Antioxidant, Chelating Agent
- Egg –
- Egg yolk –
- Egg white –
- Elderberry –
- Eleutherococcus senticosus –
- Enzymatically hydrolyzed Carboxymethyl cellulose – emulsifier
- Enzyme treated starch – thickener, vegetable gum
- Epazote (Chenopodium ambrosioides) –
- Epsom salts – mineral salt, acidity regulator, firming agent
- Erythorbic acid – antioxidant
- Erythrosine – color (red) (FDA: FD&C Red #3)
- Erythritol – sweetener
- Ethanol (alcohol) –
- Ethoxyquin - antioxidant, preservative
- Ethyl maltol – flavor enhancer
- Ethyl methyl cellulose – thickener, vegetable gum, emulsifier
- Ethylparaben (ethyl para-hydroxybenzoate) – preservative
- Ethylenediamine tetraacetic acid –
- Evening primrose oil – used as a food supplement for its purported medicinal properties.

== F ==
- False flax oil – made of the seeds of Camelina sativa. Can be considered as a food or fuel oil.
- Fantesk –
- Farnesol –
- Fast green FCF – color (FDA: FD&C Green #3)
- Fat –
- Flavoxanthin – color
- Fennel (Foeniculum vulgare) –
- Fenugreek –
- Ferric ammonium citrate – food acid
- Ferrous gluconate – color retention agent
- Ferrous lactate –
- Filé powder –
- Five-spice powder (Chinese) –
- Fo-ti-tieng –
- Formaldehyde – preservative
- Formic acid – preservative
- Fructose –
- Fumaric acid – acidity regulator
- Folic acid – fortyfying agent

== G ==
- Galangal –
- Galangal root –
- Galbanum oil –
- Gallic acid –
- Gamma-tocopherol(synthetic) – antioxidant
- Garam masala –
- Garlic extract –
- Garlic –
- Garlic oil –
- Gelatin/gelatine – Gelling agent, emulsifier
- Gellan gum – thickener, vegetable gum, stabilizer, emulsifier
- Ginger –
- Ginger oil –
- Ginger root –
- Ginseng –
- Glacial Acetic acid – preservative, acidity regulator
- Glucitol –
- Gluconate –
- Glucono delta-lactone – acidity regulator
- Glucose oxidase – antioxidant
- Glucose syrup – sweetener
- Glutamate –
- Glutamic acid – flavor enhancer
- Gluten –
- Glycerin – humectant, sweetener
- Glycerol –
- Glycerol ester of wood rosin – emulsifier
- Glyceryl distearate – emulsifier
- Glyceryl monostearate – emulsifier
- Glycine – flavor enhancer
- Glyoxylic acid –
- Gold – color (gold)
- Grains of paradise –
- Grape color extract –
- Grape seed oil – suitable for cooking at high temperatures. Also used as a salad oil, and in cosmetics.
- Green S – color (green)
- Green tea –
- Guanylic acid – flavor enhancer
- Guar gum – thickener, vegetable gum, stabilizer
- Guaranine –
- Gum arabic / Gum acacia / E414 – thickener, vegetable gum, stabilizer, emulsifier
- Gum guaicum – preservative

== H ==
- Haw bark –
- Hazelnut oil – used for its flavor. Also used in skin care, because of its slight astringent nature.
- Heliotropin –
- Helium – propellant
- Hemlock oil –
- Hemp oil – a high quality food oil.
- Heptyl p-hydroxybenzoate – preservative
- Hesperidin –
- Hexamine (hexamethylene tetramine) – preservative
- Hexyl acetate –
- High fructose corn syrup –
- Horseradish –
- Hydrochloric acid – acidity regulator
- Hydroxypropyl cellulose – thickener, vegetable gum, emulsifier
- Hydroxypropyl distarch phosphate – thickener, vegetable gum
- Hydroxypropyl methylcellulose – thickener, vegetable gum, emulsifier
- Hydroxypropyl starch – thickener, vegetable gum
- Hyssop (Hyssopus officinalis) –

== I ==
- Indanthrene blue RS – color (blue)
- Indigo carmine – color (blue) (FDA: FD&C Blue #2)
- Indigotine – color (blue) (FDA: FD&C Blue #2)
- Indole –
- Inosinate –
- Inosinic acid – flavor enhancer
- Inositol –
- Insoluble fiber –
- Intense sweeteners –
- Inulin –
- Invert sugar –
- Invertase –
- Iron ammonium citrate –
- Iron –
- Iron oxides and hydroxides – color
- Isobutane – propellant
- Isomalt – humectant
- Isopropyl citrates – antioxidant, preservative

== J ==
- Jasmine –
- Jamaican jerk spice –
- Jasmine absolute –
- Jiaogulan (Gynostemma pentaphyllum) –
- Juniper –
- Juniper berry –
- Juniper berry oil – used as a flavor. Also used medicinally, including traditional medicine.
- Juniper extract –

== K ==
- Kaffir Lime Leaves (Citrus hystrix, C. papedia) –
- Kaolin – anti-caking agent
- Kapok seed oil, obtained from any of several related tree species, all referred to as "Kapok trees", for example: Ceiba pentandra, Bombax ceiba and Bombax costatum – used as an edible oil, and in soap production.
- Karaya gum – thickener, vegetable gum, stabilizer, emulsifier
- Kelp –
- Kokam –
- Kola nut extract –
- Konjac – thickener, vegetable gum
- Konjac glucomannate – thickener, vegetable gum
- Konjac gum – thickener, vegetable gum

== L ==
- L-cysteine – flour treatment agent
- Lactic acid – acidity regulator, preservative, antioxidant
- Lactic acid esters of mono- and diglycerides of fatty acids – emulsifier
- Lactitol – humectant
- Lactose –
- Lactylated fatty acid esters of glycerol and propylene glycol – emulsifier
- Larch gum –
- Lard –
- Latolrubine – color
- Laurel berry –
- Laurel leaf oil –
- Lavender (Lavandula spp.) –
- Lavender oil –
- Lecithins – antioxidant, Emulsifier
- Lecithin citrate – preservative
- Lemon –
- Lemon balm (Melissa officinalis) –
- Lemon extract –
- Lemon juice –
- Lemon Myrtle (Backhousia citriodora) –
- Lemon oil –
- Lemon verbena (Lippia citriodora) –
- Lemongrass Oil –
- Leucine – flavor enhancer
- Licorice –
- Lipases – flavor enhancer
- Lithol Rubine BK – color
- Litholrubine – color
- Locust bean gum – thickener, vegetable gum, stabilizer, gelling agent, emulsifier
- Long pepper –
- Lovage (Levisticum officinale) –
- L(+)-Tartaric acid – food acid
- Lutein – color
- Lycopene – color
- Lysine –
- Lysozyme – preservative

== M ==
- Macadamia oil – used as an edible oil. Also used as a massage oil.
- Mace –
- Magnesium –
- Magnesium carbonate – anti-caking agent, mineral salt
- Magnesium chloride – mineral salt
- Magnesium citrate – acidity regulator
- Magnesium diglutamate – flavor enhancer
- Magnesium hydroxide – mineral salt
- Magnesium lactate – food acid
- Magnesium oxide – anti-caking agent
- Magnesium phosphates – mineral salt, anti-caking agent
- Magnesium salts of fatty acids – emulsifier, stabiliser, anti-caking agent
- Magnesium silicate – anti-caking agent
- Magnesium stearate – emulsifier, stabiliser
- Magnesium sulfate – mineral salt, acidity regulator, firming agent
- Mahleb –
- Malabathrum –
- Malic acid – acidity regulator
- Malt extract – flavor enhancer
- Maltitol – humectant, stabiliser
- Maltodextrin – carbohydrate sweetener
- Maltol – flavor enhancer
- Maltose –
- Mandarin oil – leavening agent
- Manganese –
- Mannitol – humectant, anti-caking agent, sweetener
- Margarine –
- Marjoram (Origanum majorana) –
- Mastic –
- Meadowfoam seed oil – highly stable oil, with over 98% long-chain fatty acids. Competes with rapeseed oil for industrial applications.
- Mega-purple – a Kosher food additive made from grapes
- Mentha arvensis oil/Mint oil, used in flavoring toothpastes, mouthwashes and pharmaceuticals, as well as in aromatherapy and other medicinal applications.
- Metatartaric acid – food acid, emulsifier
- Methionine –
- Methyl butyrate –
- Methyl disulfide –
- Methyl ethyl cellulose – thickener, vegetable gum, emulsifier
- Methyl hexenoate –
- Methyl isobutyrate –
- Methylcellulose – thickener, emulsifier, vegetable gum
- Methylparaben (methyl para-hydroxybenzoate) – preservative
- Methyltheobromine –
- Microcrystalline cellulose – anti-caking agent
- Milk thistle (Silybum) –
- Milk –
- Mint (Mentha spp.) –
- Mixed acetic and tartaric acid esters of mono- and diglycerides of fatty acids – emulsifier
- Modified starch –
- Molasses extract –
- Molybdenum –
- Bergamot (Monarda didyma) –
- Mono- and diglycerides of Fatty acids – emulsifier
- Monoammonium glutamate – flavor enhancer
- Monopotassium glutamate – flavor enhancer
- Monosodium glutamate (MSG) – flavor enhancer
- Monostarch phosphate – thickener, vegetable gum
- Montanic acid esters – humectant
- Mullein (Verbascum thapsus) –
- Mustard –
- Mustard oil – (essential oil), containing a high percentage of allyl isothiocyanate or other isothiocyanates, depending on the species of mustard
- Mustard oil (pressed) – used in India as a cooking oil. Also used as a massage oil.
- Mustard plant –
- Mustard seed –

== N ==
- Natamycin – preservative
- Neohesperidin dihydrochalcone – artificial sweetener
- Niacin (vitamin B_{3}) – color retention agent
  - nicotinic acid (vitamin B_{3}) – color retention agent
  - Nicotinamide (vitamin B_{3}) – color retention agent
- Nigella (Kolanji, Black caraway) –
- Nisin – preservative
- Nitrogen – propellant
- Nitrous oxide – propellant
- Norbixin – color
- Nordihydroguaiaretic acid - antioxidant. Banned as a food additive since the early 1960s.
- Nutmeg –

== O ==
- Octyl gallate – antioxidant, preservative
- Evening primrose (Oenothera biennis et al.) –
- Okra oil (Hibiscus seed oil) – from the seed of the Hibiscus esculentus. Composed predominantly of oleic and lanoleic acids.
- Oleomargarine –
- Olive oil – used in cooking – cosmetics – soaps and as a fuel for traditional oil lamps
- Orange GGN – color (orange)
- Orange oil – like lemon oil – cold pressed rather than distilled. Consists of 90% d-Limonene. Used as a fragrance, in cleaning products and in flavoring foods.
- Orcein – color (red)
- Orchil – color (red)
- Oregano (Origanum vulgare, O. heracleoticum, and other species) –
- Oregano oil – contains thymol and carvacrol
- Orris root –
- Orthophenyl phenol – preservative
- Oxidised polyethylene wax – humectant
- Oxidised starch – thickener, vegetable gum
- Oxystearin – antioxidant, sequestrant

== P ==
- Palm oil – the most widely produced tropical oil. Also used to make biofuel.
- Panax ginseng –
- Panax quinquefolius –
- Ponch phoran –
- Pandan leaf –
- Pantothenic acid (Vitamin B_{5}) –
- Papain – A cysteine protease hydrolase enzyme present in papaya (Carica papaya) and mountain papaya (Vasconcellea cundinamarcensis).
- Paprika red –
- Paprika –
- Paprika extract –
- Paraffins – glazing agent
- Parsley (Petroselinum crispum) –
- Patent blue V – color (blue)
- Peanut oil/Ground nut oil – mild-flavored cooking oil.
- Pecan oil – valued as a food oil, but requiring fresh pecans for good quality oil.
- Pectin – vegetable gum, emulsifier
- Perilla seed oil – high in omega-3 fatty acids. Used as an edible oil, for medicinal purposes, in skin care products and as a drying oil.
- Phosphated distarch phosphate – thickener, vegetable gum
- Phosphoric acid – food acid
- Phytic acid – preservative
- Pigment Rubine – color
- Pimaricin – preservative
- Pine needle oil
- Pine seed oil – an expensive food oil, used in salads and as a condiment.
- Pistachio oil – strongly flavored oil, particularly for use in salads.
- Prune kernel oil – marketed as a gourmet cooking oil
- Poly vinyl pyrrolidone –
- Polydextrose – humectant
- Polyethylene glycol 8000 – antifoaming agent
- Polyglycerol esters of fatty acids – emulsifier
- Polyglycerol polyricinoleate – emulsifier
- Polymethylsiloxane – antifoaming agent
- Polyoxyethylene (40) stearate – emulsifier
- Polyoxyethylene (8) stearate – emulsifier, stabilizer
- Polyphosphates – mineral salt, emulsifier
- Polysorbate 20 – emulsifier
- Polysorbate 40 – emulsifier
- Polysorbate 60 – emulsifier
- Polysorbate 65 – emulsifier
- Polysorbate 80 – emulsifier
- Polyvinylpolypyrrolidone – color stabiliser
- Pomegranate seeds (though some consider these a fruit, not a spice) –
- Ponceau 4R – color (FDA: Ext D&C Red #8)
- Ponceau 6R – color
- Ponceau SX – color
- Poppy seed –
- Poppyseed oil – used for cooking, moisturizing skin, and in paints, varnishes and soaps.
- Potassium acetates – preservative, acidity regulator
- Potassium adipate – food acid
- Potassium alginate – thickener, vegetable gum, stabilizer, gelling agent, emulsifier
- Potassium aluminium silicate – anti-caking agent
- Potassium ascorbate – antioxidant (water-soluble)
- Potassium benzoate – preservative
- Potassium bicarbonate – mineral salt
- Potassium bisulfite – preservative, antioxidant
- Potassium bromate – flour treatment agent
- Potassium carbonate – mineral salt
- Potassium chloride – mineral salt
- Potassium citrates – food acid
- Potassium ferrocyanide – anti-caking agent
- Potassium fumarate – food acid
- Potassium gluconate – stabiliser
- Potassium hydrogen sulfite – preservative, antioxidant
- Potassium hydroxide – mineral salt
- Potassium lactate – food acid
- Potassium malate – food acid
- Potassium metabisulfite – preservative, antioxidant
- Potassium nitrate – preservative, color fixative
- Potassium nitrite – preservative, color fixative
- Potassium phosphates – mineral salt
- Potassium propionate – preservative
- Potassium salts of fatty acids – emulsifier, stabiliser, anti-caking agent
- Potassium sodium tartrate – food acid
- Potassium sorbate – preservative
- Potassium sulfate – mineral salt, seasoning
- Potassium sulfite – preservative, antioxidant
- Potassium tartrates – food acid
- Powdered Cellulose – anti-caking agent
- Primrose (Primula) – candied flowers, tea
- Processed Eucheuma seaweed – thickener, vegetable gum, stabilizer, gelling agent, emulsifier
- Propane-1,2-diol alginate – thickener, vegetable gum, stabilizer, emulsifier
- Propionic acid – preservative
- Propyl gallate – antioxidant
- Propylene glycol – humectant
- Propylene glycol alginate – thickener, vegetable gum, stabilizer, emulsifier
- Propylene glycol esters of fatty acids – emulsifier
- Propylparaben (propyl para-hydroxybenzoate) – preservative
- Pumpkin seed oil – a specialty cooking oil, produced in Austria and Slovenia. Doesn't tolerate high temperatures.
- Pulegone – flavoring present in mint
- Purslane –
- Pyridoxine hydrochloride (Vitamin B_{6}) –

== Q ==
- Quatre épices –
- Quillaia extract – humectant
- Quinoa oil – similar in composition and use to corn oil
- Quinoline Yellow WS – color (yellow and orange) (FDA: D&C Yellow #10)

== R ==
- Ramtil oil – pressed from the seeds of the one of several species of genus Guizotia abyssinica (Niger pea) in India and Ethiopia. Used for both cooking and lighting.
- Ras-el hanout –
- Raspberry (leaves) –
- Red 2G – color
- Refined microcrystalline wax – glazing agent
- Rhodoxanthin – color
- Riboflavin (vitamin B_{2}) – color (yellow and orange)
- Rice bran oil – suitable for high temperature cooking. Widely used in Asia.
- Rosemary (Rosmarinus officinalis) –
- Rubixanthin – color

== S ==
- Saccharin – artificial sweetener
- Safflower oil – a flavorless and colorless cooking oil.
- Safflower –
- Saffron – color
- Saigon Cinnamon –
- Salad Burnet (Sanguisorba minor or Poterium sanguisorba) –
- Salt –
- Sandalwood – color
- Savory (Satureja hortensis, S. montana) –
- Scarlet GN – color
- Sesame oil – used as a cooking oil, and as a massage oil, particularly in India.
- Sesame seed –
- Shellac – glazing agent
- Sichuan pepper (Xanthoxylum piperitum) –
- Silicon dioxide – anti-caking agent
- Silver – color (silver)
- Luohanguo –
- Sodium acetate – preservative, acidity regulator
- Sodium adipate – food acid
- Sodium alginate – thickener, vegetable gum, stabilizer, gelling agent, emulsifier
- Sodium aluminium phosphate – acidity regulator, emulsifier
- Sodium aluminosilicate (sodium aluminium silicate) – anti-caking agent
- Sodium ascorbate – antioxidant (water-soluble)
- Sodium benzoate – preservative
- Sodium bicarbonate – mineral salt
- Sodium bisulfite (sodium hydrogen sulfite) – preservative, antioxidant
- Sodium carbonate – mineral salt
- Sodium carboxymethylcellulose – emulsifier
- Sodium citrates – food acid
- Sodium dehydroacetate – preservative
- Sodium erythorbate – antioxidant
- Sodium erythorbin – antioxidant
- Sodium ethyl para-hydroxybenzoate – preservative
- Sodium ferrocyanide – anti-caking agent
- Sodium formate – preservative
- Sodium fumarate – food acid
- Sodium gluconate – stabiliser
- Sodium hydrogen acetate – preservative, acidity regulator
- Sodium hydroxide – mineral salt
- Sodium lactate – food acid
- Sodium malates – food acid
- Sodium metabisulfite – preservative, antioxidant, bleaching agent
- Sodium methyl para-hydroxybenzoate – preservative
- Sodium nitrate – preservative, color fixative
- Sodium nitrite – preservative, color fixative
- Sodium orthophenyl phenol – preservative
- Sodium propionate – preservative
- Sodium propyl para-hydroxybenzoate – preservative
- Sodium sorbate – preservative
- Sodium stearoyl lactylate – emulsifier
- Sodium succinates – acidity regulator, flavor enhancer
- Sodium salts of fatty acids – emulsifier, stabiliser, anti-caking agent
- Sodium sulfite – mineral salt, preservative, antioxidant
- Sodium sulfite – preservative, antioxidant
- Sodium tartrates – food acid
- Sodium tetraborate – preservative
- Sorbic acid – preservative
- Sorbitan monolaurate – emulsifier
- Sorbitan monooleate – emulsifier
- Sorbitan monopalmitate – emulsifier
- Sorbitan monostearate – emulsifier
- Sorbitan tristearate – emulsifier
- Sorbitol – humectant, emulsifier, sweetener
- Sorbol –
- Sorrel (Rumex spp.) –
- Soybean oil – accounts for about half of worldwide edible oil production.
- Spearmint oil – often used in flavoring mouthwash and chewing gum, among other applications.
- Star anise –
- Star anise oil – highly fragrant oil using in cooking. Also used in perfumery and soaps, has been used in toothpastes, mouthwashes, and skin creams. 90% of the world's star anise crop is used in the manufacture of Tamiflu, a drug used to treat avian flu.
- Starch sodium octenylsuccinate – thickener, vegetable gum
- Stearic acid – anti-caking agent
- Stearyl tartarate – emulsifier
- Succinic acid – food acid
- Sucralose – artificial sweetener
- Sucroglycerides – emulsifier
- Sucrose acetate isobutyrate – emulsifier, stabiliser
- Sucrose esters of fatty acids – emulsifier
- Sugar –
- Sulfur dioxide – preservative, antioxidant
- Sulfuric acid – acidity regulator
- Sumac –
- Sunflower oil – a common cooking oil, also used to make biodiesel.
- Sunset Yellow FCF – color (yellow and orange) (FDA: FD&C Yellow #6)
- Sweet basil –
- Sweet woodruff –

== T ==
- Talc – anti-caking agent
- Tamarind – flavoring
- Tanacetum balsamita / Costmary –
- Tandoori masala –
- Tannins – color, emulsifier, stabiliser, thickener
- Tansy –
- Tara gum – thickener, vegetable gum, stabilizer
- Tarragon (Artemisia dracunculus) –
- Tartaric acid esters of mono- and diglycerides of fatty acids – emulsifier
- Tartrazine – color (yellow and orange) (FDA: FD&C Yellow #5)
- Tea oil/Camellia oil – widely used in southern China as a cooking oil. Also used in making soaps, hair oils and a variety of other products.
- Tert-butylhydroquinone – antioxidant
- Tetrahydrocannabinol- flavor enhancer, potent anti-carcinogen –
- Thaumatin – flavor enhancer, artificial sweetener
- Theine –
- Thermally oxidised soya bean oil – emulsifier
- Thiabendazole – preservative
- Thiamine (Vitamin B1) –
- Thiodipropionic acid – antioxidant
- Thujaplicins – preservatives registered in Japan
- Thyme – used as a flavor, particularly as seasoning for meat products.
- stannous chloride – color retention agent, antioxidant
- Titanium dioxide – color (white)
- Tocopherol (Vitamin E) –
- Tocopherol concentrate (natural) – antioxidant
- Tragacanth – thickener, vegetable gum, stabilizer, emulsifier
- Triacetin – humectant
- Triammonium citrate – food acid
- Triethyl citrate – thickener, vegetable gum
- Trimethylxanthine –
- Triphosphates – mineral salt, emulsifier
- Trisodium phosphate – mineral salt, antioxidant
- Turmeric – color (yellow and orange)

== V ==
- Vanilla (Vanilla planifolia) – flavoring
- Vegetable carbon – color (brown and black)
- Vinegar –
- Violaxanthin – color
- Vitamin –
  - Vitamin A (Retinol) –
  - Vitamin B_{1} (Thiamine) –
  - Vitamin B_{2} (Riboflavin) –
  - Vitamin B_{5} (Pantothenic acid) –
  - Vitamin B_{6} (Pyrodoxine) –
  - Vitamin B_{12} (Cyanocobalamin) –
  - Vitamin C (Ascorbic acid) –
  - Vitamin D (Calciferol) –
  - Vitamin E (Tocopherol) –
  - Vitamin K (Potassium) –

== W ==
- Walnut oil – used for its flavor, also used by Renaissance painters in oil paints
- Wasabi –
- Water –
- Wattleseed – thickener

== X ==
- Xanthan gum – thickener, vegetable gum, stabilizer
- Xylitol – humectant, stabiliser

== Y ==
- Yellow 2G – color (yellow and orange)
- Yucca extract – foaming agent, stabilizer

== Z ==
- Zeaxanthin – color
- Zinc acetate – flavor enhancer

== See also ==
- Food Chemicals Codex
- List of additives in cigarettes
- List of food additives, Codex Alimentarius
- List of unrefined sweeteners
- List of phytochemicals in food
