= Ammonium ferric citrate =

Highly soluble organic compound, food ingredient

- Structure of ammonium ferric citrate

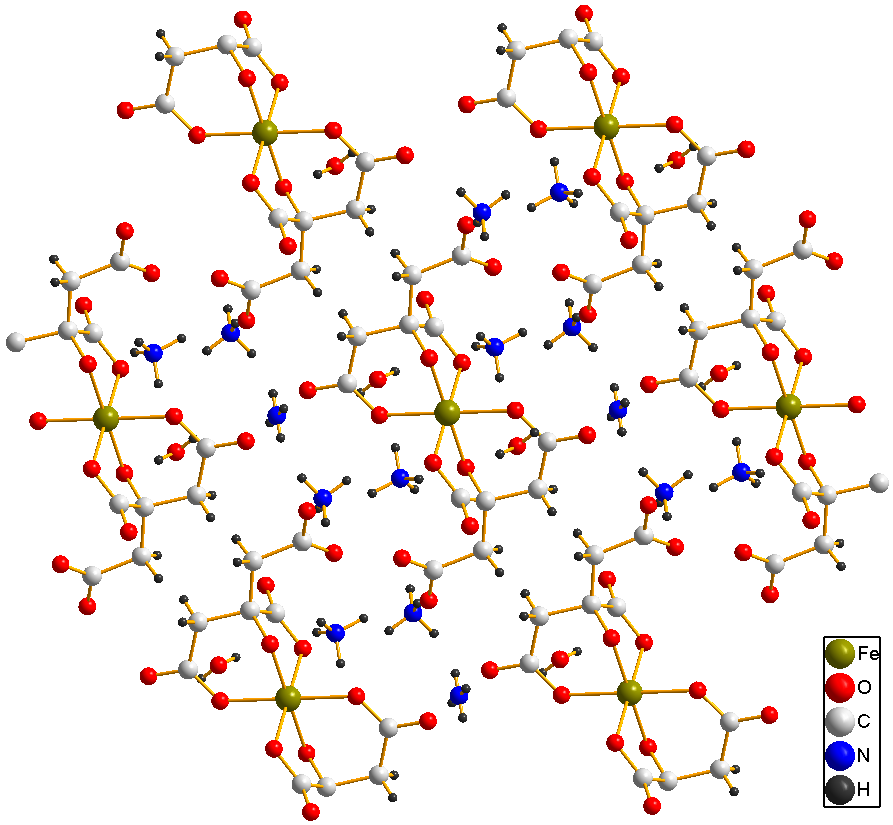
- Crystal structure of [NH_{4}]_{5}[Fe(C_{6}H_{4}O_{7})_{2}]·2H_{2}O

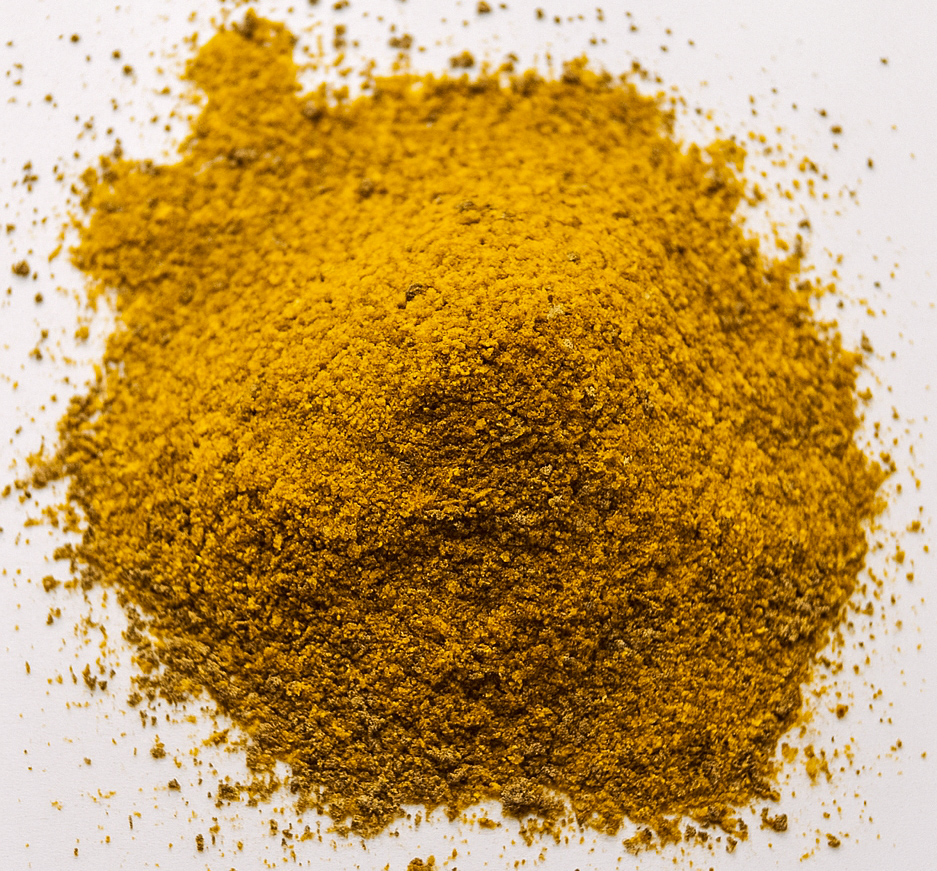
- Powdered ammonium ferric citrate

Names
- IUPAC name 2-Hydroxypropane-1,2,3-tricarboxylate, ammonium iron(3+) salt
- Other names Ferric ammonium citrate Ammonium iron(III) citrate Ammonium ferric citrate Iron ammonium citrate FerriSeltz

Identifiers
CAS Number	1185-57-5
3D model (JSmol)	Interactive image
ChEBI	CHEBI:31604
ChEMBL	ChEMBL1200460
ChemSpider	13804
ECHA InfoCard	100.013.351
EC Number	214-686-6
E number	E381 (antioxidants, ...)
KEGG	D01644
PubChem CID	14457
UNII	UVP74NG1C5
CompTox Dashboard (EPA)	DTXSID9040477
- InChI: InChI=1S/C6H8O7.Fe.H3N/c7-3(8)1-6(13,5(11)12)2-4(9)10;;/h13H,1-2H2,(H,7,8)(H,9,10)(H,11,12);;1H3/q;+3;/p-2 Key: FRHBOQMZUOWXQL-UHFFFAOYSA-L; InChI=1/C6H8O7.Fe.H3N/c7-3(8)1-6(13,5(11)12)2-4(9)10;;/h13H,1-2H2,(H,7,8)(H,9,10)(H,11,12);;1H3/q;+3;/p-2 Key: FRHBOQMZUOWXQL-NUQVWONBAA
- SMILES: C(C(=O)[O-])C(CC(=O)[O-])(C(=O)[O-])O.N.[Fe+3]

Properties
Chemical formula	C_{6}H_{8}O_{7}⋅xFe^{3+}⋅yNH_{3}
Appearance	yellow crystals or powder

Pharmacology
ATC code	V08CA07 (WHO)

Hazards
- Safety data sheet (SDS)
- Except where otherwise noted, data are given for materials in their standard state (at 25 °C [77 °F], 100 kPa). verify (what is ?) Infobox references

Ammonium ferric citrate (also known as ferric ammonium citrate or ammoniacal ferrous citrate) has the formula [NH_{4}]{y}[Fe{x}(C_{6}H_{4}O_{7})]. The iron in this compound is trivalent. All three carboxyl groups and the central hydroxyl group of citric acid are deprotonated. A distinguishing feature of this compound is that it is very soluble in water, in contrast to ferric citrate which is not very soluble.

In its crystal structure each moiety of citric acid has lost four protons. The deprotonated hydroxyl group and two of the carboxylate groups ligate to the ferric center, while the third carboxylate group coordinates with the ammonium.

== Uses ==
Ammonium ferric citrate has a range of uses, including:

- As a food ingredient, it has an INS number 381, and is used as an acidity regulator, for example in the Scottish beverage Irn-Bru.
- Water purification
- As a reducing agent of metal salts of low activity like gold and silver
- With potassium ferricyanide as part of the cyanotype photographic process
- Used in Kligler's Iron Agar (KIA) test to identify enterobacteriaceae bacteria by observing their metabolism of different sugars, producing hydrogen sulfide
- In medical imaging, ammonium ferric citrate is used as a contrast medium.
- As a hematinic

== See also ==
- Food additive
- List of food additives
