= C6H13NO3S =

C_{6}H_{13}NO_{3}S is the molecular formula for several chemical compounds containing six carbon atoms, thirteen hydrogen atoms, one nitrogen atom, three oxygen atoms, and one sulfur atom.

The molecular formula C_{6}H_{13}NO_{3}S (molar mass: 179.23 g/mol) may refer to:

- Cyclamic acid
- Fudosteine
