= Potassium in biology =

The sodium–potassium pump is a critical enzyme for regulating sodium and potassium levels in cells.

Potassium is the main intracellular ion for all types of cells, while having a major role in maintenance of fluid and electrolyte balance. Potassium is necessary for the function of all living cells and is thus present in all plant and animal tissues. It is found in especially high concentrations within plant cells, and in a mixed diet, it is most highly concentrated in fruits. The high concentration of potassium in plants, associated with comparatively very low amounts of sodium there, historically resulted in potassium first being isolated from the ashes of plants (potash), which in turn gave the element its modern name. The high concentration of potassium in plants means that heavy crop production rapidly depletes soils of potassium, and agricultural fertilizers consume 93% of the potassium chemical production of the modern world economy.

The functions of potassium and sodium in living organisms are quite different. Animals, in particular, employ sodium and potassium differentially to generate electrical potentials in animal cells, especially in nervous tissue. Potassium depletion in animals, including humans, results in various neurological dysfunctions. Characteristic concentrations of potassium in model organisms are: 30–300 mM in E. coli, 300 mM in budding yeast, 100 mM in mammalian cell and 4 mM in blood plasma.

== Function in plants ==
The main role of potassium in plants is to provide the ionic environment for metabolic processes in the cytosol, and as such functions as a regulator of various processes including growth regulation. Plants require potassium ions (K^{+}) for protein synthesis and for the opening and closing of stomata, which is regulated by proton pumps to make surrounding guard cells either turgid or flaccid. A deficiency of potassium ions can impair a plant's ability to maintain these processes. Potassium also functions in other physiological processes such as photosynthesis, protein synthesis, activation of some enzymes, phloem solute transport of photoassimilates into source organs, and maintenance of cation:anion balance in the cytosol and vacuole.

== Function in animals ==
Potassium is the major cation (K^{+}, a positive ion) inside animal cells, while sodium (Na^{+}) is the major cation outside animal cells. The difference between the concentrations of these charged particles causes a difference in electric potential between the inside and outside of cells, known as the membrane potential. The balance between potassium and sodium is maintained by ion transporters in the cell membrane. All potassium ion channels are tetramers with several conserved secondary structural elements. A number of potassium channel structures have been solved including voltage gated, ligand gated, tandem-pore, and inwardly rectifying channels, from prokaryotes and eukaryotes. The cell membrane potential created by potassium and sodium ions allows the cell to generate an action potential—a "spike" of electrical discharge. The ability of cells to produce electrical discharge is critical for body functions such as neurotransmission, muscle contraction, and heart function.

== Dietary recommendations ==
The U.S. National Academy of Medicine (NAM), on behalf of both the U.S. and Canada, sets Dietary Reference Intakes, including Estimated Average Requirements (EARs) and Recommended Dietary Allowances (RDAs), or Adequate Intakes (AIs) for when there is not sufficient information to set EARs and RDAs.

US adequate intakes (AIs) for potassium
Age	Male	Female	Pregnancy	Lactation
Birth to 6 months	400 mg	400 mg		
7–12 months	860 mg	860 mg		
1–3 years	2,000 mg	2,000 mg		
4–8 years	2,300 mg	2,300 mg		
9–13 years	2,500 mg	2,300 mg		
14–18 years	3,000 mg	2,300 mg	2,600 mg	2,500 mg
19–50 years	3,400 mg	2,600 mg	2,900 mg	2,800 mg
51+ years	3,400 mg	2,600 mg		

As for safety, the NAM also sets tolerable upper intake levels (ULs) for vitamins and minerals, but for potassium the evidence was insufficient, so no UL was established.

In 2019, the National Academies of Sciences, Engineering, and Medicine revised the Adequate Intake for potassium to 2,600 mg/day for females 19 years of age and older who are not pregnant or lactating, and 3,400 mg/day for males 19 years of age and older.

The European Food Safety Authority (EFSA) refers to the collective set of information as Dietary Reference Values, with Population Reference Intake (PRI) instead of RDA, and Average Requirement instead of EAR. AI and UL are defined the same as in the United States. For people ages 15 and older, the AI is set at 3,500 mg/day. AIs for pregnancy is 3,500 mg/day, for lactation 4,000 mg/day. For children ages 1–14 years, the AIs increase with age from 800 to 2,700 mg/day. These AIs are lower than the U.S. RDAs. The EFSA reviewed the same safety question and decided that there was insufficient data to establish a UL for potassium.

=== Labeling ===
For U.S. food and dietary supplement labeling purposes, the amount in a serving is expressed as a percent of Daily Value (%DV). For potassium labeling purposes, 100% of the Daily Value was 3500 mg, but as of May 2016, it has been revised to 4700 mg. A table of the old and new adult Daily Values is provided at Reference Daily Intake.

== Supplements ==
20 mEq (781 mg) potassium from potassium gluconate (4680 mg), or potassium citrate (2040 mg), mixed with a half-cup (1.12 dL) water, taken two to four times a day, may be used on a daily basis.

=== Labeling ===
Because of the risk of small-bowel lesions, the US FDA requires some potassium salts (for example potassium chloride) containing more than 99 mg (about 1.3 mEq) to be labeled with a warning.

== Food sources ==
Eating a variety of foods that contain potassium is the best way to get an adequate amount. Foods with high sources of potassium include kiwifruit, orange juice, potatoes, coconut, avocados, apricots, parsnips and turnips, although many other fruits, vegetables, legumes, and meats contain potassium.

Common foods very high in potassium:

- beans (white beans and others)
- dark leafy greens (spinach, Swiss chard, and others)
- potatoes
- dried fruit (apricots, peaches, prunes, raisins; figs and dates)
- squash
- yogurt
- fish (salmon)
- avocado
- nuts (pistachios, almonds, walnuts, etc.)
- seeds (squash, pumpkin, sunflower)

Foods containing the highest concentration:

- dried herbs
- sun dried tomatoes
- cocoa powder (14% fat)
- whey powder
- paprika
- yeast extract
- rice bran
- molasses
- dry roasted soybeans

== Deficiency ==
=== High blood pressure/Hypertension ===
Diets low in potassium increase risk of hypertension, stroke and cardiovascular disease.

=== Hypokalemia ===
A severe shortage of potassium in body fluids may cause a potentially fatal condition known as hypokalemia. Hypokalemia typically results from loss of potassium through diarrhea, diuresis, or vomiting. Symptoms are related to alterations in membrane potential and cellular metabolism. Symptoms include muscle weakness and cramps, paralytic ileus, ECG abnormalities, intestinal paralysis, decreased reflex response and (in severe cases) respiratory paralysis, alkalosis and arrhythmia.

In rare cases, habitual consumption of large amounts of black licorice has resulted in hypokalemia. Licorice contains a compound (glycyrrhizin) that increases urinary excretion of potassium.

=== Insufficient intake ===
Adult women in the United States consume on average half the AI, for men two-thirds. For all adults, fewer than 5% exceed the AI. Similarly, in the European Union, insufficient potassium intake is widespread.

== Side effects and toxicity ==
Gastrointestinal symptoms are the most common side effects of potassium supplements, including nausea, vomiting, abdominal discomfort, and diarrhea. Taking potassium with meals or taking a microencapsulated form of potassium may reduce gastrointestinal side effects.

Hyperkalemia is the most serious adverse reaction to potassium. Hyperkalemia occurs when potassium builds up faster than the kidneys can remove it. It is most common in individuals with renal failure. Symptoms of hyperkalemia may include tingling of the hands and feet, muscular weakness, and temporary paralysis. The most serious complication of hyperkalemia is the development of an abnormal heart rhythm (arrhythmia), which can lead to cardiac arrest.

Although hyperkalemia is rare in healthy individuals, oral doses greater than 18 grams taken at one time in individuals not accustomed to high intakes can lead to hyperkalemia.

== See also ==
- Biology and pharmacology of chemical elements
- Action potential – Neuron communication by electric impulses
- Calcium in biology
- Electrolyte – Substance whose dissolved ions conduct electricity
- Iodine in biology
- Magnesium in biology
- Membrane potential – Electric potential difference between interior and exterior of a biological cell
- Selenium in biology
- Sodium in biology
