= Iron(II) lactate =

Names
- IUPAC name Ferrous 2-hydroxypropanoate
- Other names: Iron dilactate; Iron(II) lactate; E585

Identifiers
CAS Number	5905-52-2
3D model (JSmol)	Interactive image
ChemSpider	20839
ECHA InfoCard	100.025.098
E number	E585 (acidity regulators, ...)
PubChem CID	22197
UNII	5JU4C2L5A0
CompTox Dashboard (EPA)	DTXSID501018671 DTXSID20905003, DTXSID501018671
- InChI: InChI=1/2C3H6O3.Fe/c2*1-2(4)3(5)6;/h2*2,4H,1H3,(H,5,6);/q;;+2/p-2 Key: DKKCQDROTDCQOR-NUQVWONBAL
- SMILES: [Fe+2].[O-]C(=O)C(O)C.[O-]C(=O)C(O)C

Properties
Chemical formula	C_{6}H_{10}FeO_{6}
Molar mass	233.9888 g/mol (anhydrous); 288.03464 g/mol (trihydrate)
Appearance	greenish-white powder
Melting point	500 °C (932 °F; 773 K)
Solubility in water	trihydrate: 2.1 g/100ml (10 °C); 8.5 g/100ml (100 °C) dihydrate: 2% (25 °C)
Solubility	soluble in alkali citrates negligible in alcohol insoluble in ether

Hazards
- GHS labelling
Pictograms	(GHS07: Exclamation mark)
Signal word	Warning
Hazard statements	H302, H315, H319, H335
Precautionary statements	P261, P264, P264+P265, P270, P271, P280, P301+P317, P302+P352, P304+P340, P305+P351+P338, P319, P321, P330, P332+P317, P337+P317, P362+P364, P403+P233, P405, P501
- Except where otherwise noted, data are given for materials in their standard state (at 25 °C [77 °F], 100 kPa). Infobox references

Ferrous lactate, or iron(II) lactate, are coordination complexes of iron(II) with one or more lactate ligands. One example is [Fe(lactate)_{2}(H_{2}O)_{2}](H_{_{2}}O), where lactate is CH_{3}CH(OH)CO^{−}_{2}. It is a colorless solid.

== Production ==
Iron(II) lactate can be produced through several reactions, among which are calcium lactate with iron(II) sulfate according to the following reaction:

Ca(C_{3}H_{5}O_{3})_{2}(aq) + FeSO_{4}(aq) → CaSO_{4}↓ + Fe(C_{3}H_{5}O_{3})_{2}(aq)

Another route yielding iron(II) lactate is to combine lactic acid with calcium carbonate and iron(II) sulfate.

== Uses ==
Iron(II) lactate is used as a reagent in the production of proton-exchange membrane fuel cells (PEMFCs), specifically in the production of cathode catalytic converters used in these cells. It is an acidity regulator, and, since it oxidizes on contact with air, it has found use as a color retention agent for foodstuffs such as olives. It is also used as a remedy for iron-deficiency anemia, both to fortify foods with iron and as a nutritional supplement in tablet or pill form. As a food additive it is coded under the E number E585.
