= E350 =

E350 or E-350 may refer to:

- E350 (food additive), an EU recognised food additive
- E-350, a Ford E-Series van or minibus
- E-350, in the List of AMD Accelerated Processing Unit microprocessors
- E350, a Mercedes-Benz E-Class sedan or wagon

== See also ==
- Canon EOS 350D, a digital single-lens reflex camera
