= Sequestrant =

Food preservative

A sequestrant is a food additive which improves the quality and stability of foods. A sequestrant forms chelate complexes with polyvalent metal ions, especially copper, iron and nickel. This can prevent the oxidation of the fats in the food. Sequestrants are therefore a type of preservative.

The name comes from Latin and means "to withdraw from use".

Common sequestrants are:

- Calcium chloride (E509)
- Calcium acetate (E263)
- Calcium disodium ethylene diamine tetra-acetate (E385)
- Glucono delta-lactone (E575)
- Sodium gluconate (E576)
- Potassium gluconate (E577)
- Sodium tripolyphosphate (E451)
- Sodium hexametaphosphate (E452i)

Sodium and calcium salts of EDTA are also commonly used in many foods and beverages.
