= Pistachio (disambiguation) =

A pistachio is a culinary nut and the tree that bears it.

Pistachio may also refer to:

- Pistachio green, a pale green similar to the color of the nut's interior meat
- Pistachio ice cream, an ice cream flavor made with pistachio nuts or flavor
- Pistachio oil, a pressed oil, extracted from the fruit of Pistacia vera, the pistachio nut
- Pistachio pudding, a green pudding made from pistachio nuts
- The L4 microkernel family, a computer operating system component
- Pishtaco, a South American bogeyman
- The Pishtacos, a Peruvian gang
- Mitsubishi Pistachio, a three-door sedan introduced by Mitsubishi Motors in December 1999
- Yaz Pistachio, a character in Bloom County
- Vincenzo Pistacchio, Catholic Bishop of Bitetto (1499–1518) and Conversano (1494–1499), Italy
