= E353 =

E353 may refer to:

- Metatartaric acid, a food additive in the E number series
- E353 series, a group of 3- or 9-coach Japanese Electric Multiple Units.
