= E350 (food additive) =

E350 is an EU recognised food additive. It comes in two forms,

- E350 (i) Sodium malate
- E350 (ii) Sodium hydrogen malate

Sodium malate is a sodium salt of malic acid (E296), a natural acid present in fruit, its alate is used as a buffer and flavouring in soft drinks, confectionery and other foods. The D,L - and D-isomers are not allowed for infants - who lack the enzymes to metabolise these compounds.
