= Colour retention agent =

Colour retention agents are food additives that are added to food to prevent the colour from changing. Many of them work by absorbing or binding to oxygen before it can damage food (antioxidants). For example, ascorbic acid (vitamin C) is often added to brightly coloured fruits such as peaches during canning.

== List of colour retention agent ==
E number	Common name	Max permitted level	Sources	Application
E222	Sodium bisulfite		Sulfite food and beverage additives	Meat, hominy, bananas
E300	Ascorbic acid	GMP	Standard 1.3.1 - Food Additives (Australian)	Wine, sparkling wine and fortified wine
E300	Ascorbic acid	0.03% (w/w), or 0.02% (w/w) depending on the matrix	The Miscellaneous Food Additives Regulations 1995	Fruit and vegetable-based drinks, juices and baby foods Fat-containing cereal-based foods including biscuits and rusks

== See also ==
- Artificial sweetener
- Acidity regulator
- Codex Alimentarius
- E number
- Food colouring
- Food safety
- List of antioxidants in food
- List of food additives
- List of food additives, Codex Alimentarius
- List of fruits
- List of vegetables
