= Assugrin =

Sugar substitute brand

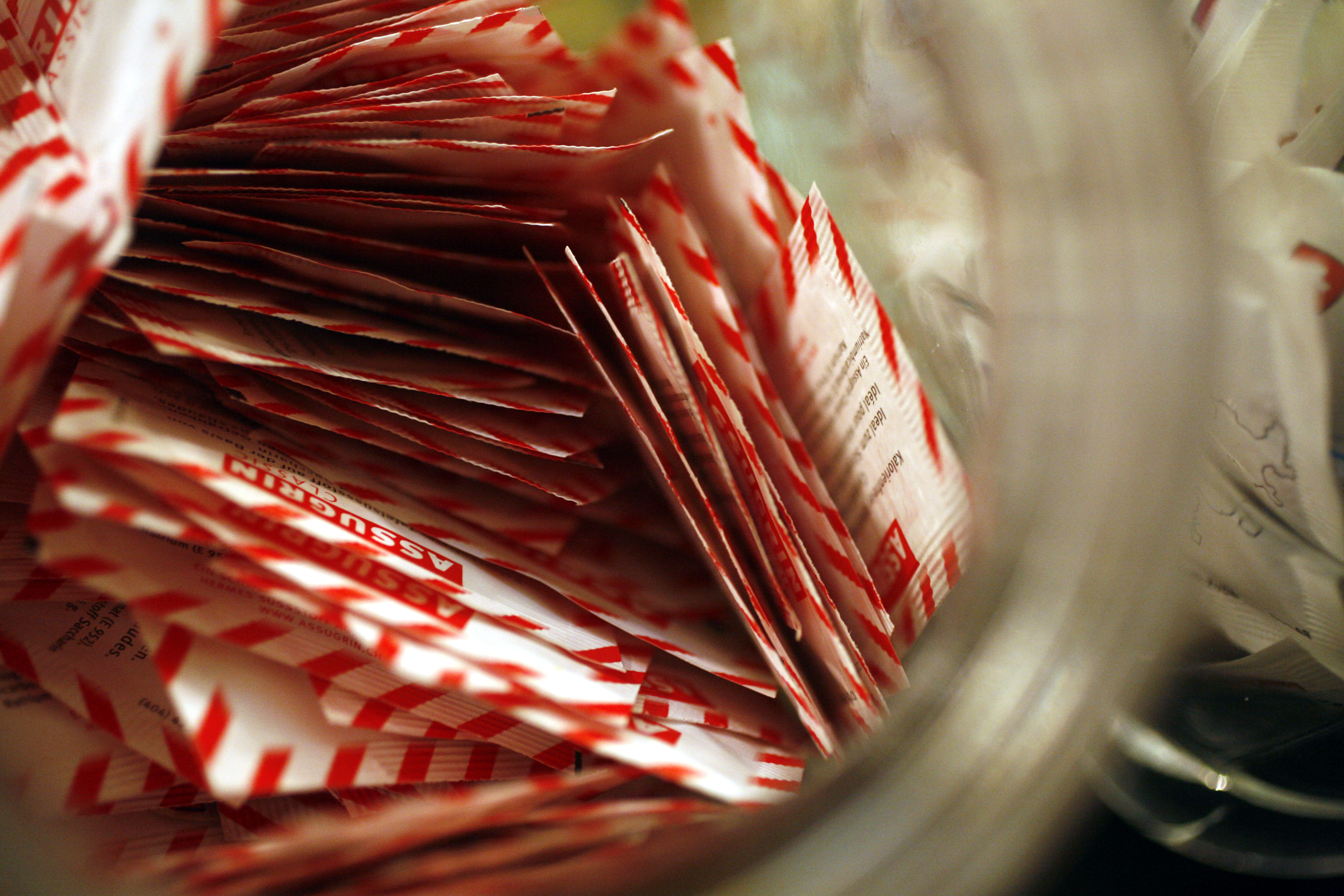
Packets of Assugrin, a brand of cyclamate sugar substitute.

Assugrin is a brand name for a sugar substitute that is a blend of cyclamate and saccharin. Produced in Switzerland by MCM Klosterfrau Vertriebsgesellschaft, Assugrin was the main table sweetener in West Germany.

== History ==
Cyclamate sugar substitute was discovered in 1937 by two American chemists and tested over the subsequent twenty years. After cyclamate was declared safe for consumption in the mid-1950s, the Hermes Company announced their new product, Assugrin, in 1954. More than a decade later, in 1965, Hermes company came up with a mixture of saccharin and cyclamate. It was later introduced to the market under the brand name Assugrin. In that same year, aspartame was discovered. Aspartame was introduced into the Assugrin brand as Assugrin Gold.

In 1987, orange and lemon varieties were added to the West German low-calorie soft drink Assugrin Exquisit. In 1990, Albi launched Assugrin Aktiv (Iso-Mineral-Fitness-Drink), a reduced calorie sports drink. Hermes Sweeteners Ltd introduced Assugrin Light blended sweetener as a "special diet food" in 1995.

In 2002, the Assugrin brand was introduced in Brazil through a new dietetic sweetener made with saccharin, water, artificial sweeteners, and sodium cyclamate.

In 2003, Swiss sweeteners producer Hermes Edulcorants, headquartered in Zurich, generated 67 million Swiss francs ($53.2 million/€44.4 million) for 2003. Their brand, the Assugrin sweetener, was being sold in about 100 countries, but mainly in Switzerland, Germany, and Austria. Assugrin also has a presence in Spain and Brazil.
