= Sodium fumarate =

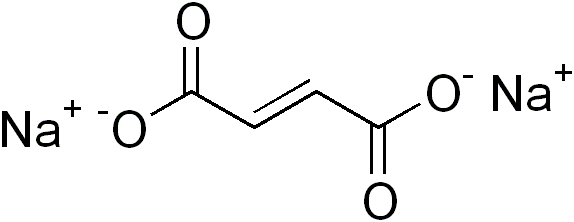

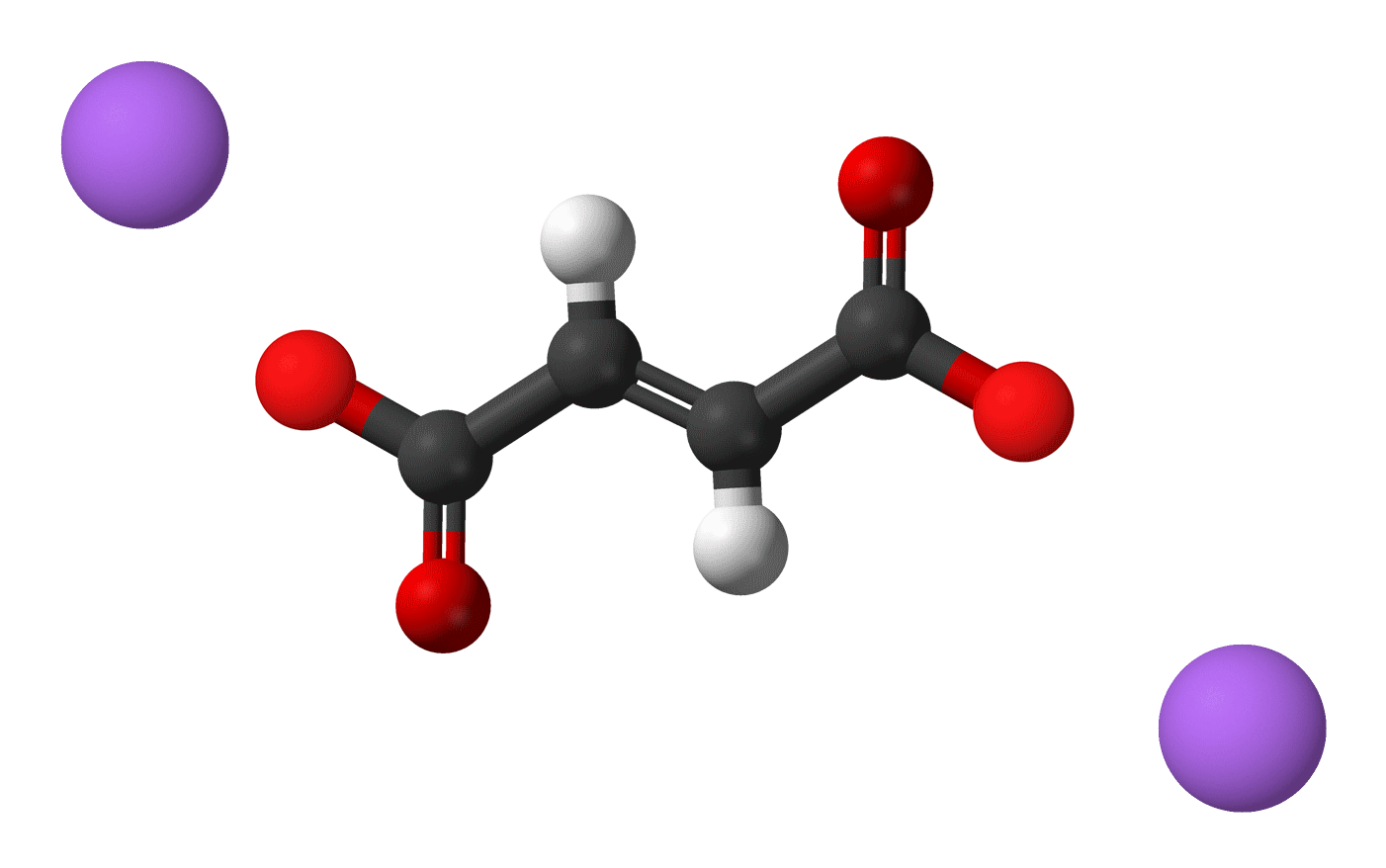

Names
- Preferred IUPAC name Disodium (2E)-but-2-enedioate
- Other names Disodium fumarate

Identifiers
CAS Number	5873-57-4; 7704-73-6 (non-specific)
3D model (JSmol)	Interactive image
ChEBI	CHEBI:115156
ChemSpider	4895542
ECHA InfoCard	100.037.337
PubChem CID	9734
UNII	F11949924I
CompTox Dashboard (EPA)	DTXSID10168802
- InChI: InChI=1S/C4H4O4.2Na/c5-3(6)1-2-4(7)8;;/h1-2H,(H,5,6)(H,7,8);;/q;2*+1/p-2/b2-1+;; Key: MSJMDZAOKORVFC-SEPHDYHBSA-L; InChI=1/C4H4O4.2Na/c5-3(6)1-2-4(7)8;;/h1-2H,(H,5,6)(H,7,8);;/q;2*+1/p-2/b2-1+;; Key: MSJMDZAOKORVFC-HYKNURKJBY
- SMILES: [Na+].[Na+].[O-]C(=O)\C=C\C([O-])=O

Properties
Chemical formula	C_{4}H_{2}Na_{2}O_{4}
Molar mass	160.04 g/mol
Appearance	White powder
- Except where otherwise noted, data are given for materials in their standard state (at 25 °C [77 °F], 100 kPa). verify (what is ?) Infobox references

Sodium fumarate, also called disodium fumarate, is a compound with the molecular formula Na_{2}C_{4}H_{2}O_{4}. It is the sodium salt of fumaric acid, used as an acidity regulator in processed foods. Sodium fumarate and fumaric acid are sometimes used as terminal electron acceptors in the cultivation of certain anaerobic microorganisms. It appears as an odourless, white, crystalline powder and is soluble in water.
