= Potassium malate =

Chemical compound

Names
- IUPAC name dipotassium 2-hydroxybutanedioate
- Other names Dipotassium malate; E351

Identifiers
CAS Number	585-09-1
3D model (JSmol)	Interactive image
ChemSpider	144374
ECHA InfoCard	100.008.683
E number	E351 (antioxidants, ...)
PubChem CID	164689
UNII	5YO4AE78DB
CompTox Dashboard (EPA)	DTXSID80974053
- InChI: InChI=1S/C4H6O5.2K/c5-2(4(8)9)1-3(6)7;;/h2,5H,1H2,(H,6,7)(H,8,9);;/q;2*+1/p-2 Key: SVICABYXKQIXBM-UHFFFAOYSA-L; InChI=1/C4H6O5.2K/c5-2(4(8)9)1-3(6)7;;/h2,5H,1H2,(H,6,7)(H,8,9);;/q;2*+1/p-2 Key: SVICABYXKQIXBM-NUQVWONBAI
- SMILES: C(C(C(=O)[O-])O)C(=O)[O-].[K+].[K+]

Properties
Chemical formula	C_{4}H_{4}K_{2}O_{5}
Molar mass	210.268 g·mol^{−1}
- Except where otherwise noted, data are given for materials in their standard state (at 25 °C [77 °F], 100 kPa). verify (what is ?) Infobox references

Potassium malate is a compound with formula K_{2}(C_{2}H_{4}O(COO)_{2}). It is the potassium salt of malic acid.

As a food additive, it has the E number E351. It is used as acidity regulator for use in, for example, canned vegetables, soups, sauces, fruit products, and soft drinks. It also acts as an antioxidant and a food flavoring agent.

It is an important compound in the transport of nitrate from the roots of a plant to the leaves of the plant. Potassium malate is the salt that transports from the leaves to the root. At the root, the potassium malate oxidizes to potassium carbonate, then is converted to potassium nitrate by soil nitrate and transported back to the leaves.
