= Metatartaric acid =

- Idealized chemical structure of metartaric acid

Names
- Other names E353

Identifiers
CAS Number	39469-81-3 (unspecified form); 56959-20-7 (polyether form)
3D model (JSmol)	Interactive image
ChemSpider	32820791
ECHA InfoCard	100.116.846
EC Number	609-694-5
E number	E353 (antioxidants, ...)
PubChem CID	92024228
- InChI: InChI=1S/C8H8O10/c9-1(5(11)12)3-7(15)18-4(8(16)17-3)2(10)6(13)14/h1-4,9-10H,(H,11,12)(H,13,14) Key: KWBYTEOPKORPPY-UHFFFAOYSA-N
- SMILES: C1(C(=O)OC(C(=O)O1)C(C(=O)O)O)C(C(=O)O)O

Properties
Chemical formula	(C_{4}H_{4}O_{5})_{n}
Molar mass	Variable
Appearance	Off-white solid
Solubility in water	Freely soluble
Solubility in ethanol	Soluble
- Except where otherwise noted, data are given for materials in their standard state (at 25 °C [77 °F], 100 kPa). Infobox references

Metatartaric acid is a food additive. Chemically, it is a polymeric lactone of variable composition and different molecular weights obtained through a dehydration reaction by heating tartaric acid.

== Uses ==
As a food additive, it has the E number E353 and is classified as an acidity regulator. It is added to wine to prevent the precipitation of potassium hydrogen tartrate and calcium tartrate.
