= Potassium gluconate =

Chemical compound

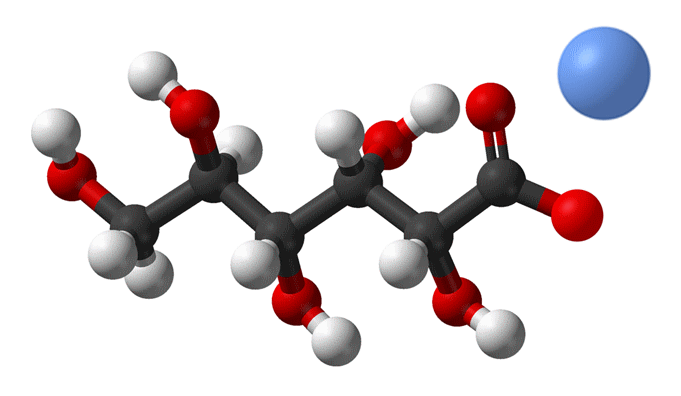

Clinical data
- AHFS/Drugs.com: Consumer Drug Information
- MedlinePlus: a601072
- ATC code: A12BA05 (WHO)

Identifiers
- IUPAC name: Potassium (2R,3S,4R,5R)-2,3,4,5,6-pentahydroxyhexanoate
- CAS Number: 299-27-4
- PubChem CID: 16760467
- ChemSpider: 8931
- UNII: 12H3K5QKN9
- E number: E577 (acidity regulators, ...)
- CompTox Dashboard (EPA): DTXSID7029617
- ECHA InfoCard: 100.005.523

Chemical and physical data
- Formula: C_{6}H_{11}KO_{7}
- Molar mass: 234.245 g·mol^{−1}
- 3D model (JSmol): Interactive image
- Melting point: 180 °C (356 °F) (decomposes)
- SMILES: [K+].[O-]C(=O)[C@H](O)[C@@H](O)[C@H](O)[C@H](O)CO
- InChI: InChI=1S/C6H12O7.K/c7-1-2(8)3(9)4(10)5(11)6(12)13;/h2-5,7-11H,1H2,(H,12,13);/q;+1/p-1/t2-,3-,4+,5-;/m1./s1; Key:HLCFGWHYROZGBI-JJKGCWMISA-M

Potassium gluconate is the potassium salt of the conjugate base of gluconic acid. It is also referred to as 2,3,4,5,6-pentahydroxycaproic acid potassium salt, D-gluconic acid potassium salt, or potassium D-gluconate.

It contains 16.69% elemental potassium by mass. Thus 5.99 g of potassium gluconate contains 1 g of potassium.

It has a density of 1.73 g/cm^{3}.

== Dietary uses ==
Potassium gluconate is used as a mineral supplement and sequestrant. It is sold over-the-counter as tablets or capsules providing up to 593 mg of potassium gluconate, thereby containing 99 mg or 2.53 milliequivalents of elemental potassium. This is the permissible upper limit for each tablet or capsule of over-the-counter potassium supplements sold in the US. Potassium gluconate is also sold over-the-counter as bulk powder.

As a food additive, potassium gluconate is used as an acidity regulator and yeast food. It is known as E number reference E577.

=== Safety ===
Its oral median lethal dose (LD_{50}) in rats is 10.38 g/kg. This is not an indicator of a safe oral daily dose in rats or humans.
