= Acidulant =

Chemical compounds that give a sour flavor to foods

Malic acid is added to some confectionaries to confer sour flavor.

Acidulants are chemical compounds that give a tart, sour, or acidic flavor to foods or enhance the perceived sweetness of foods. Acidulants can also function as leavening agents and emulsifiers in some kinds of processed foods. Though acidulants can lower pH they differ from acidity regulators, which are food additives specifically intended to modify the stability of food or enzymes within it. Typical acidulants are acetic acid (e.g. in pickles) and citric acid. Many beverages, such as colas, contain phosphoric acid. Sour candies often are formulated with malic acid. Other acidulants used in food production include: fumaric acid, tartaric acid, lactic acid and gluconic acid.

Acid	Description	Formulation	pKa (when applicable, pKa1)
Acetic acid	Gives vinegar its sour taste and distinctive smell.	C_{2}H_{4}O_{2}	4.756
Ascorbic acid	Found in various fruits, such as oranges and bell peppers, and gives a crisp, slightly sour taste; it is better known as vitamin C.	C_{6}H_{8}O_{6}	4.10
Citric acid	Found in citrus fruits and gives them their sour taste.	C_{6}H_{8}O_{7}	3.13
Fumaric acid	Found in bolete mushrooms, Iceland moss and lichens. Not found in fruits, used as a substitute for citric and tartaric acid. Enhances flavor and sourness.	C_{4}H_{4}O_{4}	3.03
Lactic acid	Found in various dairy and/or fermented products and gives them a rich tartness.	C_{3}H_{6}O_{3}	3.86
Malic acid	Found in apples and rhubarb and gives them their sour/tart taste.	C_{4}H_{6}O_{5}	3.03
Phosphoric acid	Used in some soft drinks for a sour and tangy flavour, as well as to act as a preservative.	H_{3}PO_{4}	2.14
Tartaric acid	Found in grapes and wines and gives them a tart taste. Also called racemic acid.	C_{4}H_{6}O_{6}	2.89

== See also ==
- Food additive
- List of food additives
- Sour sanding
