= Sodium malate =

Names
- Preferred IUPAC name Disodium hydroxybutanedioate
- Other names Disodium malate

Identifiers
CAS Number	676-46-0
3D model (JSmol)	Interactive image
ChEBI	CHEBI:91260
ChEMBL	ChEMBL182856
ChemSpider	8407
ECHA InfoCard	100.010.571
E number	E350i (antioxidants, ...)
PubChem CID	8736
UNII	2EFF9N315F
CompTox Dashboard (EPA)	DTXSID7046831
- InChI: InChI=1S/C4H6O5.2Na/c5-2(4(8)9)1-3(6)7;;/h2,5H,1H2,(H,6,7)(H,8,9);;/q;2*+1/p-2 Key: WPUMTJGUQUYPIV-UHFFFAOYSA-L; InChI=1/C4H6O5.2Na/c5-2(4(8)9)1-3(6)7;;/h2,5H,1H2,(H,6,7)(H,8,9);;/q;2*+1/p-2 Key: WPUMTJGUQUYPIV-NUQVWONBAU
- SMILES: [Na+].[Na+].[O-]C(=O)CC(O)C([O-])=O

Properties
Chemical formula	C_{4}H_{4}Na_{2}O_{5}
Molar mass	178.051 g·mol^{−1}
- Except where otherwise noted, data are given for materials in their standard state (at 25 °C [77 °F], 100 kPa). verify (what is ?) Infobox references

Sodium malate is a compound with formula Na_{2}(C_{2}H_{4}O(COO)_{2}). It is the sodium salt of malic acid. As a food additive, it has the E number E350.

== Properties ==
Sodium malate is an odorless white crystalline powder. It is freely soluble in water.

== Use ==
It is used as an acidity regulator and flavoring agent. It tastes similar to sodium chloride (table salt).
