= Brilliant Black BN =

Names
- IUPAC name Tetrasodium (6Z)-4-acetamido-5-oxo-6-[[7-sulfonato-4-(4-sulfonatophenyl)azo-1-naphthyl]hydrazono]naphthalene-1,7-disulfonate
- Other names: C.I. Food Black 1; 1743 Black; Black PN; Blue Black BN; Brilliant Acid Black; C.I. 28440; Certicol Black PNW; Cilefa Black B; E 151; Edicol Supra Black BN; Hexacol Black PN; L Black 8000; Melan Black; Xylene Black F

Identifiers
CAS Number	2519-30-4
3D model (JSmol)	Interactive image
ChemSpider	21159661
ECHA InfoCard	100.017.951
EC Number	219-746-5
E number	E151 (colours)
PubChem CID	5359750
UNII	2WPR32U0CP
CompTox Dashboard (EPA)	DTXSID2020183
- InChI: InChI=1S/C28H21N5O14S4.4Na/c1-14(34)29-23-10-11-24(50(42,43)44)20-13-25(51(45,46)47)27(28(35)26(20)23)33-32-22-9-8-21(18-7-6-17(12-19(18)22)49(39,40)41)31-30-15-2-4-16(5-3-15)48(36,37)38;;;;/h2-13,35H,1H3,(H,29,34)(H,36,37,38)(H,39,40,41)(H,42,43,44)(H,45,46,47);;;;/q;4*+1/p-4 Key: GMMAPXRGRVJYJY-UHFFFAOYSA-J
- SMILES: CC(=O)NC1=C2C(=C(C=C1)S(=O)(=O)[O-])C=C(C(=NNC3=C4C=C(C=CC4=C(C=C3)N=NC5=CC=C(C=C5)S(=O)(=O)[O-])S(=O)(=O)[O-])C2=O)S(=O)(=O)[O-].[Na+].[Na+].[Na+].[Na+]

Properties
Chemical formula	C_{28}H_{17}N_{5}Na_{4}O_{14}S_{4}
Molar mass	867.66 g·mol^{−1}
- Except where otherwise noted, data are given for materials in their standard state (at 25 °C [77 °F], 100 kPa). verify (what is ?) Infobox references

Brilliant Black BN (also known as Brilliant Black PN, Brilliant Black A, Black PN, Food Black 1, Naphthol Black, C.I. Food Black 1, or C.I. 28440) is a synthetic black diazo dye. It is soluble in water. It usually comes as tetrasodium salt. It has the appearance of solid, fine powder or granules. Calcium and potassium salts are known as well.

When used as a food dye, its E number is E151. It is used in food decorations and coatings, desserts, sweets, ice cream, mustard, red fruit jams, soft drinks, flavored milk drinks, fish paste, lumpfish caviar and other foods. Brilliant Black BN is used for staining animal by-products in category 2.

Brilliant Black BN is approved in the European Union. It has been banned in the United States and Japan. Brilliant Black BN was banned in Norway until 2001 when it was unbanned due to trade relationships with other countries.
