= Mega Purple =

Food additive made from grapes

Mega Purple is a grape juice concentrate by Vie-Del Company of Fresno, California. It is used as a food additive. The process used for producing the additive is proprietary. Based on the descriptions of effects to wines by winemakers it is likely produced by a series of processes such as vacuum distillation, fractional distillation, and solvent extraction. The product is one of a series of concentrates marketed as kosher additives for food with names such as Mega "Cherry Shade" Grape Juice Concentrate, Mega Purple Grape Juice Concentrate, Mega Red Grape Juice Concentrate

== In winemaking ==
There has been some discussion in the industry regarding the use of additives such as Mega Purple to bolster or enhance sensory attributes such as color, taste and mouth feel. It is reported that as much as 20% of the total production of such additives is related to wines. According to journal reports, Mega Purple is used by almost every low- to moderate-value wine producer (below US$20 per 750 ml bottle) to help standardize the bottled product ensuring a more uniform product.

It is produced by concentrating the teinturier grape Rubired, a cross between Alicante Ganzin and Tinta Cão, has 68% sugar and sells for approximately $135 a gallon.

Mega Purple has raised some controversy within the wine consuming community as its use is considered to be akin to adulterating a wine. Others, such as John Williams, winemaker for Frog's Leap Winery, has stated that the need for its use is evidence of poor viticulture and/or winemaking.
