= Lithol Rubine BK =

Names
- IUPAC name Calcium (4Z)-4-[(4-methyl-2-sulfonatophenyl)hydrazono]-3-oxo-2-naphthalenecarboxylate
- Other names: Pigment Rubine; Carmine 6B; Brilliant Carmine 6B; Permanent Rubin L6B; Litholrubine; Latolrubine; C.I. Pigment Red 57; C.I. Pigment Red 57:1; D&C Red No. 7; C.I. 15850:1; E180

Identifiers
CAS Number	5281-04-9
3D model (JSmol)	Interactive image
ChemSpider	17215383
ECHA InfoCard	100.023.736
E number	E180 (colours)
PubChem CID	9571018
UNII	ECW0LZ41X8
CompTox Dashboard (EPA)	DTXSID201045895 DTXSID7027594, DTXSID201045895
- InChI: InChI=1S/C18H14N2O6S.Ca/c1-10-6-7-14(15(8-10)27(24,25)26)19-20-16-12-5-3-2-4-11(12)9-13(17(16)21)18(22)23;/h2-9,21H,1H3,(H,22,23)(H,24,25,26);/q;+2/p-2/b20-19+; Key: PZTQVMXMKVTIRC-RZLHGTIFSA-L; InChI=1/C18H14N2O6S.Ca/c1-10-6-7-14(15(8-10)27(24,25)26)19-20-16-12-5-3-2-4-11(12)9-13(17(16)21)18(22)23;/h2-9,21H,1H3,(H,22,23)(H,24,25,26);/q;+2/p-2/b20-19+; Key: PZTQVMXMKVTIRC-LGRYAOMWBK
- SMILES: [Ca+2].[O-]S(=O)(=O)c3cc(C)ccc3/N=N/c1c2ccccc2cc(C([O-])=O)c1O

Properties
Chemical formula	C_{18}H_{12}CaN_{2}O_{6}S
Molar mass	424.44 g/mol
Appearance	Red powder
Solubility in water	slightly soluble in hot water, insoluble in cold water and ethanol
- Except where otherwise noted, data are given for materials in their standard state (at 25 °C [77 °F], 100 kPa). verify (what is ?) Infobox references

Lithol Rubine BK is a reddish synthetic azo dye. It has the appearance of a red powder and is magenta when printed. It is slightly soluble in hot water, insoluble in cold water, and insoluble in ethanol. When dissolved in dimethylformamide, its absorption maximum lies at about 442 nm. It is usually supplied as a calcium salt. It is prepared by azo coupling with 3-hydroxy-2-naphthoic acid. It is used to dye plastics, paints, printing inks, and for textile printing. It is normally used as a standard magenta in the three and four color printing processes.

When used as a food dye, it has E number E180. It is used to color cheese rind, and it is a component in some lip balms.
