= Sodium gluconate =

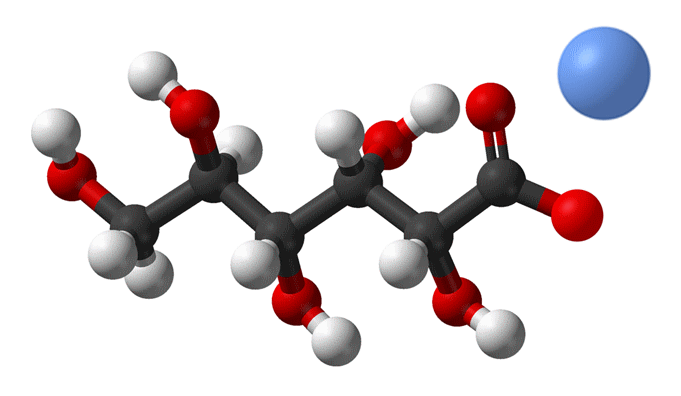

Names
- IUPAC name Sodium (2R,3S,4R,5R)-2,3,4,5,6-pentahydroxyhexanoate
- Other names Sodium D-gluconate

Identifiers
CAS Number	527-07-1
3D model (JSmol)	Interactive image
ChEBI	CHEBI:84997
ChEMBL	ChEMBL1200919
ChemSpider	76397
ECHA InfoCard	100.007.644
E number	E576 (acidity regulators, ...)
PubChem CID	23672301
UNII	R6Q3791S76
CompTox Dashboard (EPA)	DTXSID7027170
- InChI: InChI=1S/C6H12O7.Na/c7-1-2(8)3(9)4(10)5(11)6(12)13;/h2-5,7-11H,1H2,(H,12,13);/q;+1/p-1/t2-,3-,4+,5-;/m1./s1 Key: UPMFZISCCZSDND-JJKGCWMISA-M; InChI=1S/C6H12O7.Na/c7-1-2(8)3(9)4(10)5(11)6(12)13;/h2-5,7-11H,1H2,(H,12,13);/q;+1/p-1/t2-,3-,4+,5-;/m1./s1
- SMILES: [Na+].[O-]C(=O)[C@H](O)[C@@H](O)[C@H](O)[C@H](O)CO

Properties
Chemical formula	C_{6}H_{11}NaO_{7}
Molar mass	218.137 g·mol^{−1}
Appearance	White powder
Odor	Odorless
Solubility in water	58 g/100 mL
Solubility in ethanol and diethyl ether	Slightly soluble

Hazards
- Lethal dose or concentration (LD, LC)
LD_{50} (median dose)	10380 mg/kg (oral, rat)
- Except where otherwise noted, data are given for materials in their standard state (at 25 °C [77 °F], 100 kPa). verify (what is ?) Infobox references

Sodium gluconate is a compound with formula NaC_{6}H_{11}O_{7}. It is the sodium salt of gluconic acid. Its E number is E576. This white, water-soluble powder has a wide range of applications across industries. Originally derived from gluconic acid in the 19th century, sodium gluconate is known for its chelating properties and is utilized as a chelating agent in various processes. It finds applications in textile, metal surface treatment, cement, and more. Moreover, its non-toxic nature and biodegradability contribute to its use in environmentally conscious practices.

== Production ==
Sodium gluconate can be produced by chemical synthesis, an enzymatic process, or fermentation, the last of which is used commercially.

In the fermentation process, glucose is fermented by microorganisms yielding gluconic acid. Aspergillus niger and Gluconobacter oxidans are used in industry. Sodium gluconate is derived by neutralizing gluconic acid with sodium hydroxide.

== Applications ==
Sodium gluconate's early uses were primarily in medicine due to its mild and non-toxic properties. Over time, its applications expanded to various industries, including food, pharmaceuticals, construction, textiles, and more, as its versatile properties and safety profile became more widely recognized.

Food industry: Sodium gluconate is used as a food additive for various purposes, including as a sequestrant to prevent metal ions from affecting the color, flavor, or stability of food products.

Construction: Sodium gluconate is employed in the construction industry as a concrete admixture. It acts as a water reducer and retarder, enhancing the workability and performance of concrete.

Textiles: In textile dyeing and printing, it is utilized as a chelating agent to improve color fastness.

Metallurgy: Sodium gluconate is employed for metal surface treatment and cleaning, particularly for steel surfaces.

Cleaning Products: It can be found in cleaning agents for glass bottles and as a chelating agent in various cleaning formulations.

== Safety and regulation ==
Sodium Gluconate is generally recognized as safe (GRAS) for consumption by regulatory authorities such as the U.S. Food and Drug Administration (FDA). It is considered non-toxic and safe for use in food and pharmaceuticals.

== Environmental impact ==
Sodium Gluconate is known for its biodegradability, which means it can break down naturally in the environment. It is considered environmentally friendly.
