= Fudosteine =

Chemical compound

Clinical data
- Trade names: Cleanal
- Other names: S-(3-Hydroxypropyl)-L-cysteine

Legal status
- Legal status: Rx in Japan

Identifiers
- IUPAC name: (2R)-2-Amino-3-(3-hydroxypropylsulfanyl)propanoic acid
- CAS Number: 13189-98-5
- PubChem CID: 134669
- ChemSpider: 118692
- UNII: UR9VPI71PT
- KEGG: D01845
- ChEBI: CHEBI:31637
- ChEMBL: ChEMBL1555183
- CompTox Dashboard (EPA): DTXSID4046440

Chemical and physical data
- Formula: C_{6}H_{13}NO_{3}S
- Molar mass: 179.23 g·mol^{−1}
- 3D model (JSmol): Interactive image
- SMILES: C(CO)CSC[C@@H](C(=O)O)N
- InChI: InChI=1S/C6H13NO3S/c7-5(6(9)10)4-11-3-1-2-8/h5,8H,1-4,7H2,(H,9,10)/t5-/m0/s1; Key:KINWYTAUPKOPCQ-YFKPBYRVSA-N

Fudosteine (Cleanal) is a mucolytic agent. In Japan, it is approved for the treatment of bronchial asthma, chronic bronchitis, pulmonary emphysema, bronchiectasis, pulmonary tuberculosis, pneumoconiosis, atypical mycobacterial disease, and diffuse panbronchiolitis.

Fudosteine works by increasing mucin secretion by inhibiting expression of the protein mucin 5AC.
