= Prune kernel oil =

Prune kernel oil is a recently developed vegetable oil, pressed from the seeds ("kernel") of the d'Agen prune plum. The seeds are extracted from the fruitstones of the plum and have an oil content of 35% by weight, consisting of 70% oleic acid and 20% linoleic acid. The oil has a flavour reminiscent of bitter almond, and has been aggressively marketed as a gourmet virgin cooking oil. It is also used in the cosmetic industry for its emollient properties.
