= Sucrose esters =

Class of chemical compounds

Sucrose esters or sucrose fatty acid esters are a group of non-naturally occurring surfactants chemically synthesized from the esterification of sucrose and fatty acids (or glycerides). This group of substances is remarkable for the wide range of hydrophilic-lipophilic balance (HLB) that it covers. The polar sucrose moiety serves as a hydrophilic end of the molecule, while the long fatty acid chain serves as a lipophilic end of the molecule. Due to this amphipathic property, sucrose esters act as emulsifiers; i.e., they have the ability to bind both water and oil simultaneously. Depending on the HLB value, some can be used as water-in-oil emulsifiers, and some as oil-in-water emulsifiers. Sucrose esters are used in cosmetics, food preservatives, food additives, and other products. A class of sucrose esters with highly substituted hydroxyl groups, olestra, is also used as a fat replacer in food.

Sucrose monostearate

== History ==
Sucrose esters were first mentioned in 1880 by Herzfeld who described the preparation of sucrose octaacetate. The substance is still in use today as a food additive. In 1921, Hess and Messner synthesized sucrose octapalmitate and sucrose octastearate. Both are sucrose fatty acid esters.

Rosenthal, in 1924, synthesized highly substituted sucrose fatty acid esters using the classical condensation reaction between sucrose and the acid chloride of the drying oil fatty acid; pyridine was used as a solvent. Rheineck, Rabin, and Long followed the same procedure using alternative polyhydroxyl molecules such as mannitol. These condensation gave low yields, and the products, which were dark in color, needed extensive purification. Moreover, pyridine is a toxic solvent, so the synthesis was not commercially successful.

In 1939, Cantor, who patented a production route of sucrose fatty acid esters from starch factory by-products, claimed that the products could be used as emulsifying agents or fats. The classical esterification was used with a mixture of pyridine and either chloroform or carbon tetrachloride as a solvent.

Later, the concept of synthesizing sucrose esters from sucrose and fatty acids was patented in 1952. The new synthesis pathway, which involved transesterification of triglycerides and sucrose in the new solvent dimethylformamide, or DMF, was invented and seemed promising.

In the 1950s, Foster Snell and his team conducted research on the production of several mono- and di-substituted sucrose esters. Many processes are still used in commercial production today.

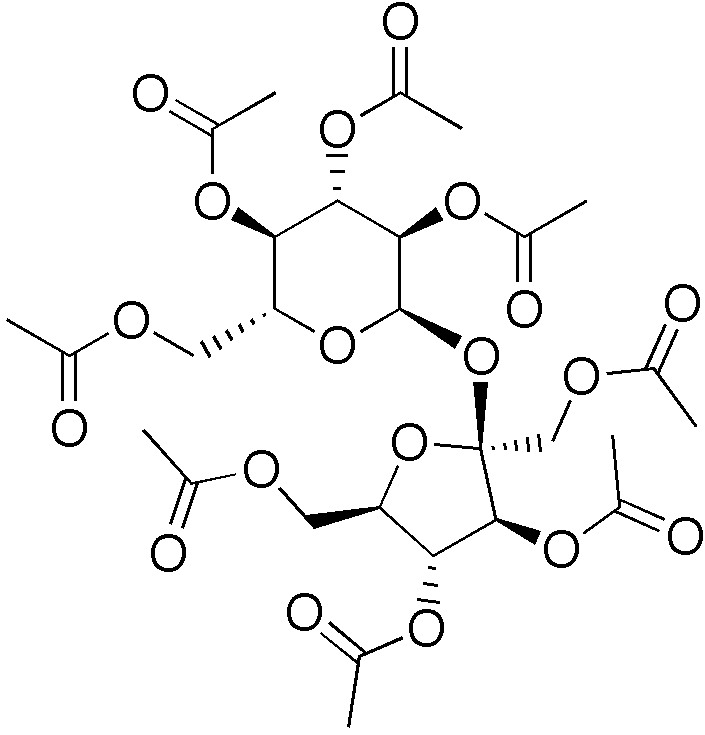
sucrose ocataacetate

== Structure ==
Sucrose is a disaccharide formed from condensation of glucose and fructose to produce α-D-glucopyranosyl-(1→2)-β-D-fructofuranoside. Sucrose has 8 hydroxyl groups which can be reacted with fatty acid esters to produce sucrose esters. Among the 8 hydroxyl groups on sucrose, three (C6, C1', and C6') are primary while the others (C2, C3, C4, C3', and C4') are secondary. (The numbers 1-6 indicate the position of the carbons on glucose while the numbers 1'-6' indicate the position of the carbons on fructose.) The three primary hydroxyl groups are more reactive due to lower steric hindrance, so they react with fatty acids first, resulting in a sucrose mono-, di-, or triester. Typical saturated fatty acids that are used to produce sucrose esters are lauric acid, myristic acid, palmitic acid, stearic acid and behenic acid, and typical unsaturated fatty acids are oleic acid and erucic acid.

== Chemical properties ==
=== Emulsification ===
Due to the hydrophilic property of sucrose and the lipophilic property of fatty acids, the overall hydrophilicity of sucrose esters can be tuned by the number of hydroxyl groups that are reacted with fatty acids and the identity of the fatty acids. The fewer free hydroxyl groups and the more lipophilic fatty acids, the less hydrophilic the resulting sucrose ester becomes. Sucrose esters' HLB values can range from 1-16. Low HLB (3.5-6.0) sucrose esters act as a water-in-oil emulsifier while high HLB (8-18) sucrose esters act as an oil-in-water emulsifier.

== Physical properties ==
Sucrose esters are off-white powders. Though produced from sucrose, sucrose esters do not have a sweet taste, but are bland or bitter.

=== Thermal stability ===
The melting point of sucrose esters is between 40 °C and 60 °C depending on the type of fatty acids and the degree of substitution. Sucrose esters can be heated to 185 °C without losing their functionality. However, the color of the product might change due to caramelization of sucrose.

=== pH stability ===
Sucrose esters are stable in the pH range of 4 to 8, so they can be used as an additive in most foods. At pH higher than 8, saponification (hydrolysis of the ester bond to release the original sucrose and the salt of fatty acids) might occur. Hydrolysis could also occur at pH lower than 4.

=== Hydrophilic - Lipophilic Balance ===
This part of the article aims at disambiguating of the notion of HLB, "Hydrophile - Lipophile Balance", attributed to Sucrose Fatty Acid Ester surfactants (also named sucrose esters or sugar esters).

The attribution of HLB values to sucrose esters emulsifiers at the origin is unclear, since no bibliographic source can be found on how the attribution has been made. There is no early scientific data, dating back to the 1990s or earlier, supporting experimentally the current HLB scale attributed to sucrose esters. However, a clear numerical correlation is found between the Griffin HLB scale defined for non-ionic poly(ethylene oxide) (PEO) surfactants and the HLB scale attributed to marketed sucrose esters.

For polyethylene oxide non ionic surfactants the HLB is defined by the Griffin's scale (Equation 1):

$HLB = 20 \times \left ( \frac{Mass \ of \ the \ hydrophilic \ part \ of \ the \ surfactant \ (PEO \ part)}{Total \ mass \ of \ the \ surfactant} \right )$

For sucrose esters, it became (Equation 2):

$HLB = 20 \times \left ( \frac{Mass \ of \ sucrose \ monoesters \ in \ the \ sucrose \ esters \ blend}{Total \ mass \ of \ the \ sucrose \ ester \ blend} \right )$

For example, for a sucrose ester mixture containing 80% of sucrose monoester, HLB = 16. This equation has been applied regardless the length of the fatty chain. A correspondence table can be written for different grades of sucrose esters according to this equation. The values calculated correspond quite closely with the data given by the suppliers (the data have been harvested from the respective suppliers' websites in March 2020).

Ryoto sugar ester Sisterna sucrose ester	P-1670 L-1695	S-1670 PS750	P-1570 S-1570 OWA-1570 L70 SP70	S-1170	S-970 SP50	S-770	S-570 SP30	S-370 B-370	S-270 SP10
% monoesters in the blend (in weight)	80	75	70	55	50	40	30	20	10
HLB calculated (Equation 2)	16	15	14	11	10	8	6	4	2
HLB attributed by the supplier Ryoto Sisterna	16	16	15	11	9 11	7	5 6	3	2

Notes: % monoesters and HLB reported in this table are the approximative values indicated by the suppliers for each blend. B= Behenate (22 carbon chain) - S = stearate (18 carbon chain) - O = Oleate (18 carbon chain, 1 unsaturation) - P = Palmitate (16 carbon chain) - M = myristate (14 carbon chain) - L = Laurate (12 carbon chain)

It means that a transposition of the HLB scale of the PEO surfactants has been made for defining the HLB of sucrose esters, because both families of surfactants are non-ionic surfactants. There are two issues with this transposition. The first one is that in this numerical transposition of the Griffin's scale to sucrose esters, the monoesters content is supposed to correspond the hydrophilic part of the surfactant what is a strong approximation because the monoesters fraction is not purely hydrophilic, since it also contains a high proportion of hydrophobic fatty chains in mass percent. It means also that, for example, a sucrose laurate blend (a sucrose grafted with a 12 carbon fatty acid) and a sucrose stearate blend (a sucrose grafted with an 18 carbon fatty acid) have the same HLB (see Table), despite the fact that sucrose laurates are really more hydrophilic and water-soluble than sucrose stearates.

The second issue is that this HLB scale, established for non-ionic PEO surfactants on the basis of experimental data, is valid only for the latter. This scale has a genuine predictive value for choosing the right PEO surfactant for a given application, typically oil-in-water or water-in-oil emulsification. Because of that, the same predictive effect is expected for the HLB index of sucrose ester, although this index has not been built on the basis of an experimental scale, but on the basis of a calculation. By using the same notion of HLB for different categories of surfactants, it is also expected that this tool would be predictive for comparing surfactants belonging to different families, e.g. PEO surfactants and sucrose esters emulsifiers. It is not the case as long as experiments have not brought evidence that correspondences are possible between the scales applied to different surfactants families. Otherwise, it brings confusion.

Non-ionic carbohydrate surfactants have a very different chemical structure and different physicochemical properties compared to polyethylene oxide surfactants family. It is the case notably for their emulsifying properties, for their sensitivity to temperature and their interaction with water through hydrogen bonding. Hence, by using the same calculated HLB scale for sucrose fatty acid esters and for polyethylene surfactants, instead of an experimental HLB scale, it is very likely that this scale will not predict properly the properties of sucrose esters. For the same reason, comparison of sucrose esters with non-ionic carbohydrate based surfactants such as Tween series is also uncertain, because the latter are grafted with polyethylene oxide chains that make them behave as PEO surfactants rather than carbohydrate surfactants.

Therefore, the HLB scale of sucrose esters as defined by suppliers up to now (March 2020) should be merely considered as an index ranking them from the most hydrophilic (high HLB) to the most lipophilic (low HLB). It is useful for comparing their properties within the sucrose ester family, but it should not be used as an experimental predictive tool for comparing their emulsifying properties to other kinds of surfactants, especially for high HLB index.

The HLB scales, defined in the 1950s, have been built from experimental methods. It is notably the case of the Griffin's scale set above, that has been established experimentally by comparing the stability of emulsions involving different oils and stabilized by a large range of POE surfactants. From this large quantity of experimental data, an experimental HLB scale has been built up. Since a relationship between the surfactant structure and the results was observed, then a numerical equation has been worked out. The equation facilitated the determination of the HLB of new PEO surfactants without the need of new experiments. This calculation thus is strictly valid within the limit of the PEO surfactants family.

Efforts to clarify the HLB of sucrose esters and related carbohydrate surfactants by experimental methods has been made in few works. Methods are based on the comparison of the stability of emulsions, on the "water number method" or on the "Phase Inversion Temperature" (PIT) method. The results tend to show that the experimental HLB of sucrose monoesters, composed of 100% of monoesters for purified products and around 70-80% for industrial blends, would be rather around 11-12 for short fatty chains (6 to 12 carbons) and around 10-11 for long fatty chains (14 to 18 carbons). These values would better describe their emulsifying behavior and would better make the correspondence with other families of surfactants. Notably, the experimental range of HLB of sucrose esters would not be so wide as the calculated HLB indicated on suppliers technical sheets, especially not as high as HLB 16. It is also important to point out the fact that in experiments, the residual amount of fatty acid (even less than 2% in weight) and the state of protonation of the latter has a significant effect on the phase properties and the emulsifying properties of sucrose esters, because the deprotonated fatty acid is highly surface active while the protonated fatty acid is not. This state of protonation has also an impact on the experimental determination of the HLB.

The "wide range of HLB" currently defined for sucrose esters marketed blends, which is supposed to spread up to 16, should be considered with a critical point of view at the light of these observations. While the use of the different grades of sucrose esters is well documented in some applications, notably for food formulations, clarifying their HLB scale on an experimental basis will help their implementation in new applications not yet documented.

== Production ==
Sucrose esters are mainly manufactured by using interesterification, the transfer of fatty acid from one ester to another. In this case, it means that the fatty acids used for the synthesis of sucrose esters are themselves in the esterified form. There are three processes that have been developed.

=== Solvent process ===
The process involves transesterification of sucrose and triglycerides under a basic condition at 90 °C. DMF was used as a solvent at first, but was later substituted with dimethyl sulfoxide or DMSO, which is less hazardous and cheaper. This process produces a mixture of sucrose monoesters and more substituted esters at about a 5:1 ratio.

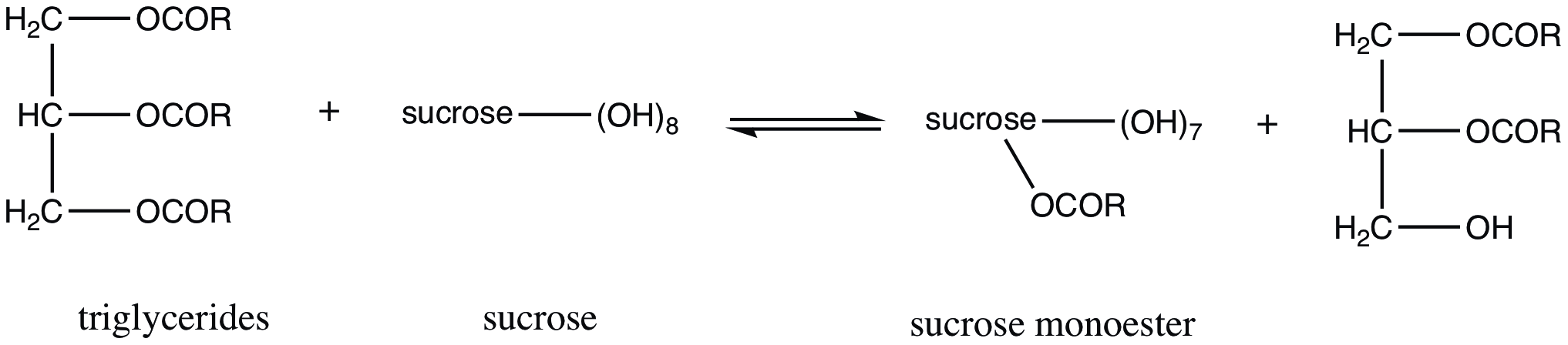

The other method involves transesterification of sucrose and fatty acid methyl ester using sodium methoxide as a basic catalyst. The by-product methanol can be removed via distillation to drive the equilibrium to favor sucrose esters.

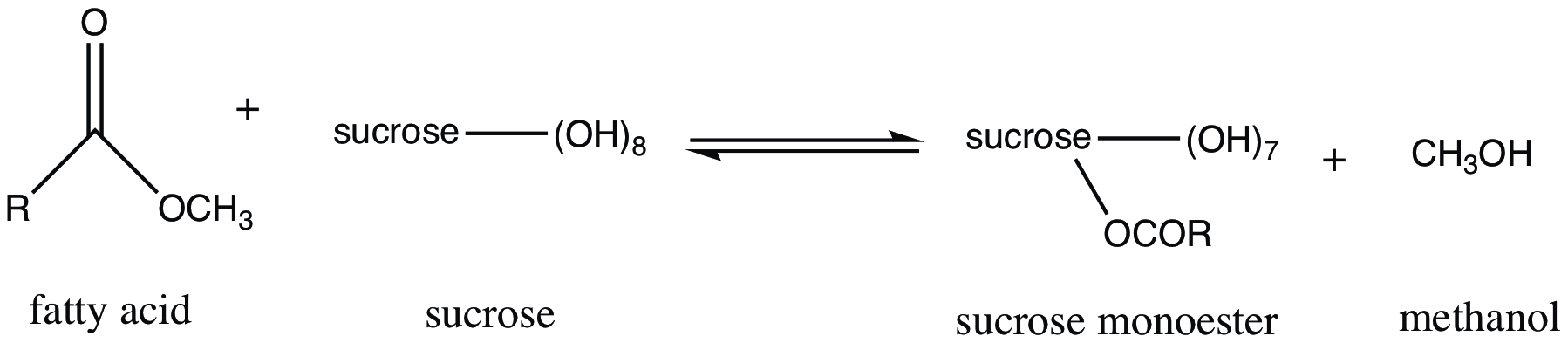

The process does not work for food industry because DMF is poisonous and may not be used in food production.

=== Emulsion process ===
The concept of microemulsion is applied in this process. The transesterification involves sucrose and fatty acid methyl ester in a solvent, propylene glycol. A basic catalyst, such as anhydrous potassium carbonate, and soap, or a fatty acid salt, are added. The reaction is carried out at 130-135 °C. Propylene glycol is removed through distillation under vacuum at above 120 °C. The purified product is achieved by filtration. The yield of the reaction is 96%. 85% of sucrose esters is monosubstituted and 15% is disubstituted.

=== Melt process ===
Molten sucrose is used instead of solvent. The reaction involves molten sucrose and fatty acid ester (methyl ester or triglyceride) with a basic catalyst, potassium carbonate or potassium soap. The high temperature (170-190 °C) is required for this process. Since the process is carried out at a high temperature, sucrose can be degraded.

Later, a new synthesis pathway was introduced. First, sucrose and fatty acid soap are dissolved in water. Then, fatty acid ester and a basic catalyst are added to the solution. The solution must be heated and the pressure should be reduced to remove water and form a molten mixture. The transesterification is carried in the temperature range of 110-175 °C.

== Uses ==
=== Cosmetics ===
Some sucrose esters, such as sucrose distearate, sucrose dilaurate, sucrose palmitate, etc. are added in cosmetics products as an emulsifier. Some have a function in skin conditioning and emollient. Cosmetics products that might have sucrose esters as an ingredient includes eyelash products, hair treatments, oil gels, skin products and deodorants.

=== Fruit preservation ===
Sucrose esters of fatty acid (E 473) are used for surface treatment of some climacteric fruits such as peaches, pears, cherries, apples, bananas, etc. E473 is allowed for application on fruit surfaces in the EU at whatever level is needed to achieve a technical effect (‘quantum satis’) and has limited allowance in the US as a component of protective coatings for fruits (CFR §172.859, limited categories inc. avocados, apples, limes [but not other citrus], peaches, pars, plums, pineapples).The coating preserves the fruits by blocking respiratory gases.

=== Pharmaceuticals ===
Due to their surfactant properties, sucrose esters are used in pharmaceutical research as a stabilizer or a surfactant on vesicles for drug delivery systems.

=== Foods ===
Sucrose esters are used as food additives in a variety of food. European Parliament and Council Directive No 95/2/EC limited the use of sucrose esters under E 473 in each kind of food. No longer in force, Date of end of validity: 20/01/2010; Repealed by 32008R1333 .

Foodstuff	Maximum level
Canned liquid coffee	1 g/L
Heat-treated meat products	5 g/kg (on fat)
Fat emulsions for baking purposes	10 g/kg
Fine bakery wares	10 g/kg
Beverage whiteners	20 g/kg
Edible ice	5 g/kg
Sugar confectionery	5 g/kg
Desserts	5 g/kg
Sauces	10 g/L
Soups and broths	2 g/L
Fresh fruits, surface treatment	quantum satis
Non-alcoholic aniseed-based drinks	5 g/L
Non-alcoholic coconut and almond drinks	5 g/L
Spirituous beverages (excluding wine and beer)	5 g/L
Powders for the preparation of hot beverages	10 g/L
Dairy-based drinks	5 g/L
Dietary food supplements	quantum satis
Dietetic foods intended for special medical purposes; Dietetic formulae for weight control intended to replace total daily food intake or an individual meal	5 g/kg
Chewing gum	10 g/kg
Cream analogues	5 g/kg
Sterilised cream and sterilised cream with reduced fat content	5 g/kg

== Legal status ==
Japan was the first country that allowed the use of sucrose esters as food additives. The Japanese Ministry of Health and Welfare approved sucrose esters in 1959. Then, in 1969, FAO/WHO approved the use of sucrose esters.

Sucrose esters were approved and registered by European Food Safety Authority or EFSA under the E number of E 473.

In the US, sucrose esters were approved by the FDA (Food and Drug Administration).
