= Blackcurrant seed oil =

Blackcurrant seed oil is derived from the seeds of Ribes nigrum (black currant, or European currant). It contains an unusually high amount of omega-6 (15–20 percent) as well as a high amount of omega-3 fatty acids (12–14 percent). It also contains linoleic acid as well as 2–4 percent stearidonic acid. There are some indications that blackcurrant seed oil is anti-inflammatory and cardioprotective. In European folk medicine, black currant once had a considerable reputation for controlling diarrhea, promoting urine output (as a diuretic) and reducing arthritic and rheumatic pains. It is primarily used medicinally and as a diet supplement.
