= Pistachio oil =

Oil pressed from pistachio nuts

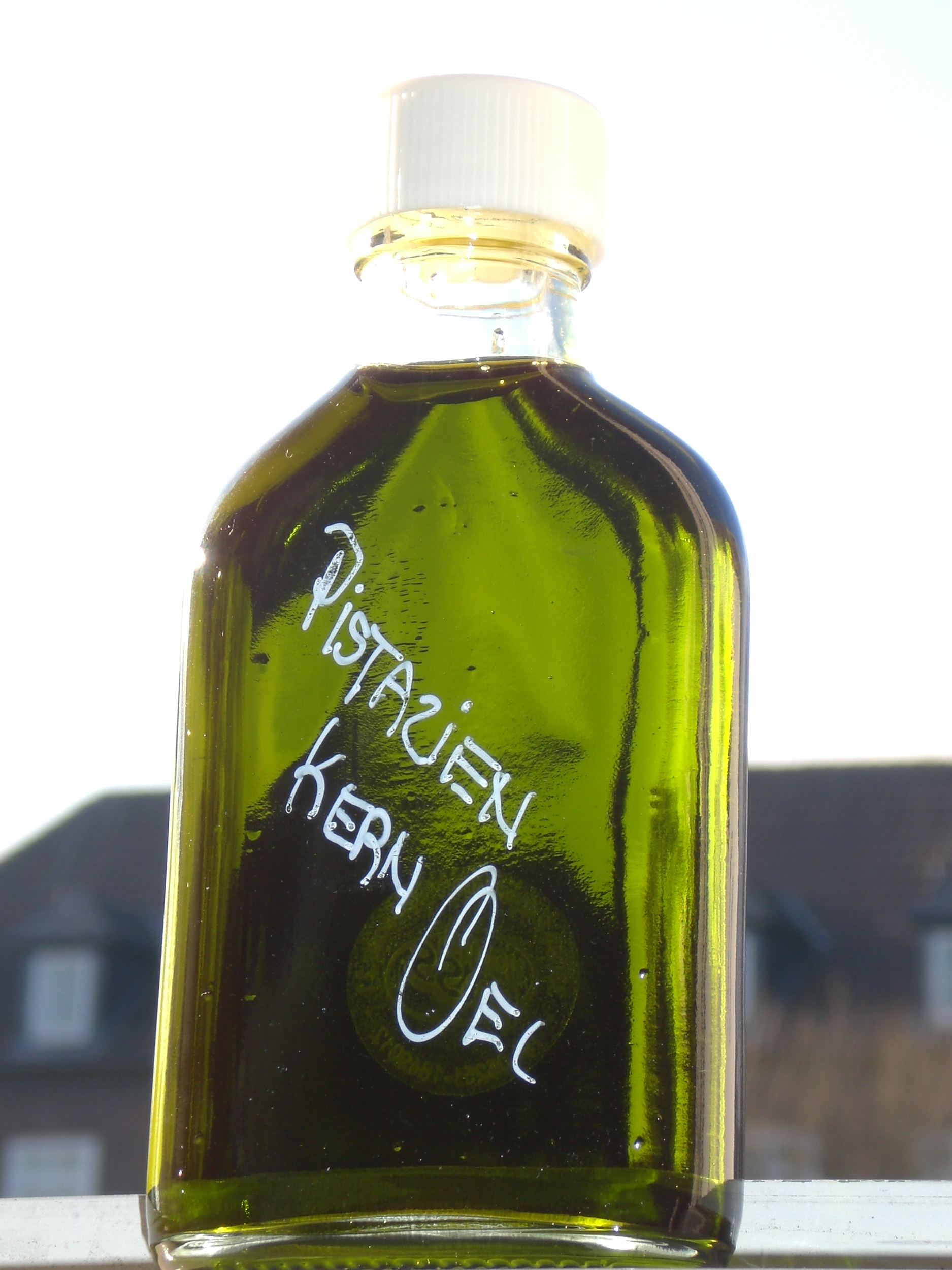
Pistachio oil

Pistachio oil is a pressed oil, extracted from the fruit of Pistacia vera, the pistachio nut.

== Composition ==
In all vegetable oils, the composition can vary depending on the cultivar, environmental conditions, harvesting, and processing.

The intense coloration, very characteristic of pistachio oil, is due to the content of chromophores, particularly chlorophyll and carotenoids. The total carotenoid content has been reported to be 15 – 61 mg/kg, with the main components in order of concentration being lutein, β-carotene, neoxanthin, luteoxanthin, and violaxanthin. The luteoxanthin content apparently increases, becoming the main species, in cold-pressed oils. The total chlorophyll content is much higher in pistachio oils extracted with solvents. The chlorophyll content is 128–200 mg/kg in solvent-extracted oils and 12–50 mg/kg in "virgin" oils, with the main components being chlorophyll a, chlorophyll b, pheophytin a, and pheophytin b.

The high concentration of monounsaturated and polyunsaturated fatty acids makes it susceptible to auto-oxidation, which can be delayed by naturally present tocopherols or added antioxidants. The total sterol concentration detected in unrefined oils is 1840–4500 mg/kg. Other minor components of pistachio oil found in some studies include squalene, phenols with aldehydes, terpenes, and alcohols that give it a characteristic aromatic note.

== Culinary uses ==
Compared to other nut oils, pistachio oil has a particularly strong flavor. Like other nut oils, it tastes similar to the nut from which it is extracted. Pistachio oil is high in Vitamin E, containing 19 mg/100g. It contains 12.7% saturated fats, 53.8% monounsaturated fats, 32.7% linoleic acid, and 0.8% omega-3 fatty acid. Pistachio oil is used as a table oil to add flavor to foods such as steamed vegetables.

== Manufacturing uses ==
Pistachio oil is also used in skin care products.
