= Cyclamate =

Cyclamate (Sodium cyclamate)

Names
- Preferred IUPAC name Sodium cyclohexylsulfamate

Identifiers
CAS Number	139-05-9
3D model (JSmol)	Interactive image
ChEMBL	ChEMBL273977
ChemSpider	8421
ECHA InfoCard	100.004.863
E number	E952(iv) (glazing agents, ...)
PubChem CID	8751
UNII	1I6F42RME1
CompTox Dashboard (EPA)	DTXSID6020355
- InChI: InChI=1S/C6H13NO3S.Na/c8-11(9,10)7-6-4-2-1-3-5-6;/h6-7H,1-5H2,(H,8,9,10);/q;+1/p-1 Key: UDIPTWFVPPPURJ-UHFFFAOYSA-M; InChI=1/C6H13NO3S.Na/c8-11(9,10)7-6-4-2-1-3-5-6;/h6-7H,1-5H2,(H,8,9,10);/q;+1/p-1 Key: UDIPTWFVPPPURJ-REWHXWOFAV
- SMILES: [Na+].O=S([O-])(=O)NC1CCCCC1

Properties
Chemical formula	C_{6}H_{12}NNaO_{3}S
Molar mass	201.22 g·mol^{−1}

Hazards
NFPA 704 (fire diamond)	2 1 0
- Except where otherwise noted, data are given for materials in their standard state (at 25 °C [77 °F], 100 kPa). verify (what is ?) Infobox references

Cyclamate is an artificial sweetener. It is 30–50 times sweeter than sucrose (table sugar), making it the least potent of the commercially used artificial sweeteners. It is often used with other artificial sweeteners, especially saccharin; the mixture of 10 parts cyclamate to 1 part saccharin is common and masks the off-tastes of both sweeteners. It is less expensive than most sweeteners, including sucralose, and is stable under heating. Safety concerns led to it being banned in a few countries, though the European Union considers it safe.

== Chemistry ==
Cyclamate is the sodium or calcium salt of cyclamic acid (cyclohexanesulfamic acid), which itself is prepared by reacting freebase cyclohexylamine with either sulfamic acid or sulfur trioxide.

Prior to 1973, Abbott Laboratories produced sodium cyclamate (Sucaryl) by a mixture of ingredients including the addition of pure sodium (flakes or rods suspended in solvent) with cyclohexylamine, chilled and filtered through a high speed centrifugal separator, dried, granulated and micro-pulverised for powder or tablet usage.

== History ==
Cyclamate was discovered in 1937 at the University of Illinois by graduate student Michael Sveda. Sveda was working in the lab on the synthesis of an antipyretic drug. He put his cigarette down on the lab bench, and when he put it back in his mouth, he discovered the sweet taste of cyclamate.

The patent for cyclamate was purchased by DuPont and later sold to Abbott Laboratories, which undertook the necessary studies and submitted a New Drug Application in 1950. Abbott intended to use cyclamate to mask the bitterness of certain drugs such as antibiotics and pentobarbital. In 1958, it was designated GRAS (generally recognized as safe) by the United States Food and Drug Administration. Cyclamate was marketed in tablet form for use by diabetics as an alternative tabletop sweetener, as well as in a liquid form. As cyclamate is stable to heat, it was and is marketed as suitable for use in cooking and baking.

In 1966, a study reported that some intestinal bacteria could desulfonate cyclamate to produce cyclohexylamine, a compound suspected to have some chronic toxicity in animals. Further research resulted in a 1969 study that found the common 10:1 cyclamate–saccharin mixture increased the incidence of bladder cancer in rats. The released study was showing that eight out of 240 rats fed a mixture of saccharin and cyclamates, at levels equivalent to humans ingesting 550 cans of diet soda per day, developed bladder tumors.

Sales continued to expand, and in 1969, annual sales of cyclamate had reached $1 billion, which increased pressure from public safety watchdogs to restrict the usage of cyclamate. In October 1969, Department of Health, Education & Welfare Secretary Robert Finch, bypassing Food and Drug Administration Commissioner Herbert L. Ley, Jr., removed the GRAS designation from cyclamate and banned its use in general-purpose foods, though it remained available for restricted use in dietary products with additional labeling; in October 1970, the FDA, under a new commissioner, banned cyclamate completely from all food and drug products in the United States.

Abbott Laboratories claimed that its own studies were unable to reproduce the 1969 study's results, and, in 1973, Abbott petitioned the FDA to lift the ban on cyclamate. This petition was eventually denied in 1980 by FDA Commissioner Jere Goyan. Abbott Labs, together with the Calorie Control Council (a political lobby representing the diet foods industry), filed a second petition in 1982. Although the FDA has stated that a review of all available evidence does not implicate cyclamate as a carcinogen in mice or rats, cyclamate remains banned from food products in the United States. The petition is now held in abeyance, though not actively considered. It is unclear whether this is at the request of Abbott Labs or because the petition is considered to be insufficient by the FDA.

In 2000, a paper was published describing the results of a 24-year-long experiment in which 16 monkeys were fed a normal diet and 21 monkeys were fed either 100 or 500 mg/kg cyclamate per day; the higher dose corresponds to about 30 cans of a diet beverage. Two of the high-dosed monkeys and one of the lower-dosed monkeys were found to have malignant cancer, each with a different kind of cancer, and three benign tumors were found. The authors concluded that the study failed to demonstrate that cyclamate was carcinogenic because the cancers were all different, occurred at the same frequency as expected in healthy monkeys, and there was no way to link cyclamate to each of them. The substance did not show any DNA-damaging properties in DNA repair assays.

== Legal status ==
Cyclamate is approved as a sweetener in at least 130 countries. In the late 1960s, cyclamate was banned in the United Kingdom; however, it was approved after being re-evaluated by the European Union in 1996.

In the Philippines, cyclamate was banned until the Philippine Food and Drug Administration lifted the ban in 2013, declaring it safe for consumption. Cyclamate remains banned in the United States, South Korea, and Bangladesh.

== Brands ==
Sweeteners produced by Sweet'n Low and Sugar Twin for Canada contain cyclamate, though not those produced for the United States.

- Assugrin (Switzerland, Brazil)
- Cap Cangkir (Indonesia)
- Chuker (Argentina) – Merisant Company 2, SARL
- Cologran
- Huxol (Germany) in liquid form
- Hermesetas (Switzerland, incl. UK market) in mini tablet, granulated, and liquid form
- Novasweet (Russia)
- Rio (Produced under license and authority of SweetLife AG Switzerland by SweetLife Ltd, China)
- Sucaryl
- Sugar Twin (Canada)
- Suitli (Bulgaria)
- Sweet'n Low (Canada)
- Sugromax (New Zealand)
