= Cyclamic acid =

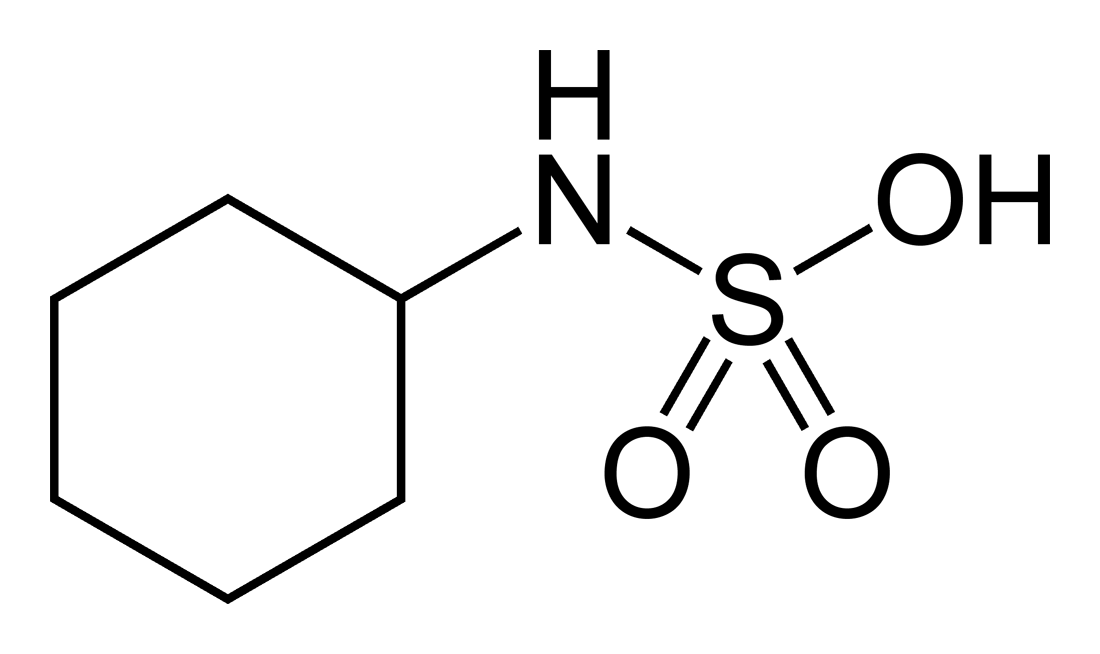
- Skeletal formula of cyclamic acid

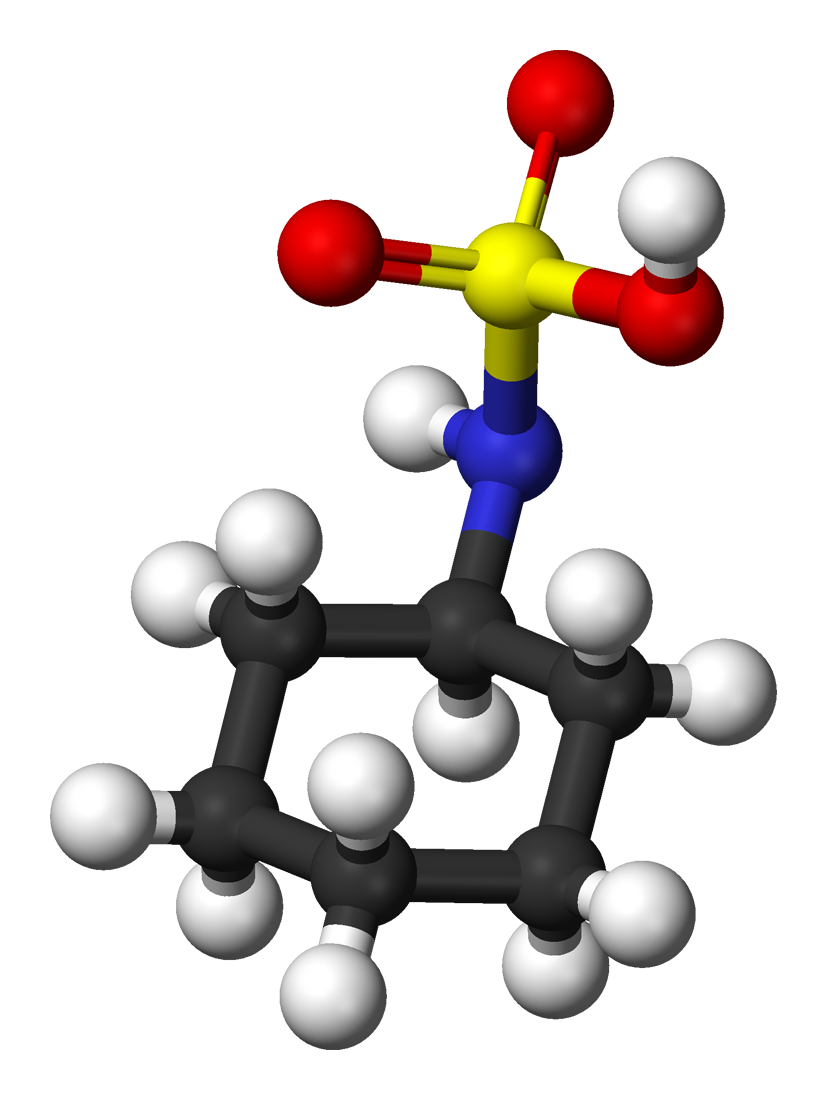
- Ball-and-stick model of cyclamic acid

Names
- Preferred IUPAC name Cyclohexylsulfamic acid

Identifiers
CAS Number	100-88-9
3D model (JSmol)	Interactive image
ChEBI	CHEBI:15964
ChEMBL	ChEMBL1206440
ChemSpider	7252
ECHA InfoCard	100.002.635
E number	E952(i) (glazing agents, ...)
KEGG	D02442
PubChem CID	7533
UNII	HN3OFO5036
CompTox Dashboard (EPA)	DTXSID5041809
- InChI: InChI=1S/C6H13NO3S/c8-11(9,10)7-6-4-2-1-3-5-6/h6-7H,1-5H2,(H,8,9,10) Key: HCAJEUSONLESMK-UHFFFAOYSA-N; InChI=1/C6H13NO3S/c8-11(9,10)7-6-4-2-1-3-5-6/h6-7H,1-5H2,(H,8,9,10) Key: HCAJEUSONLESMK-UHFFFAOYAT
- SMILES: O=S(=O)(O)NC1CCCCC1

Properties
Chemical formula	C_{6}H_{13}NO_{3}S
Molar mass	179.23 g·mol^{−1}
- Except where otherwise noted, data are given for materials in their standard state (at 25 °C [77 °F], 100 kPa). verify (what is ?) Infobox references

Cyclamic acid is a compound with formula C_{6}H_{13}NO_{3}S.

It is included in E number "E952".

Cyclamic acid is mainly used as catalyst in the production of paints and plastics, and furthermore as a reagent for laboratory usage.

The sodium and calcium salts of cyclamic acid are used as artificial sweeteners under the name cyclamate.
