= Food additive =

Substances added to food

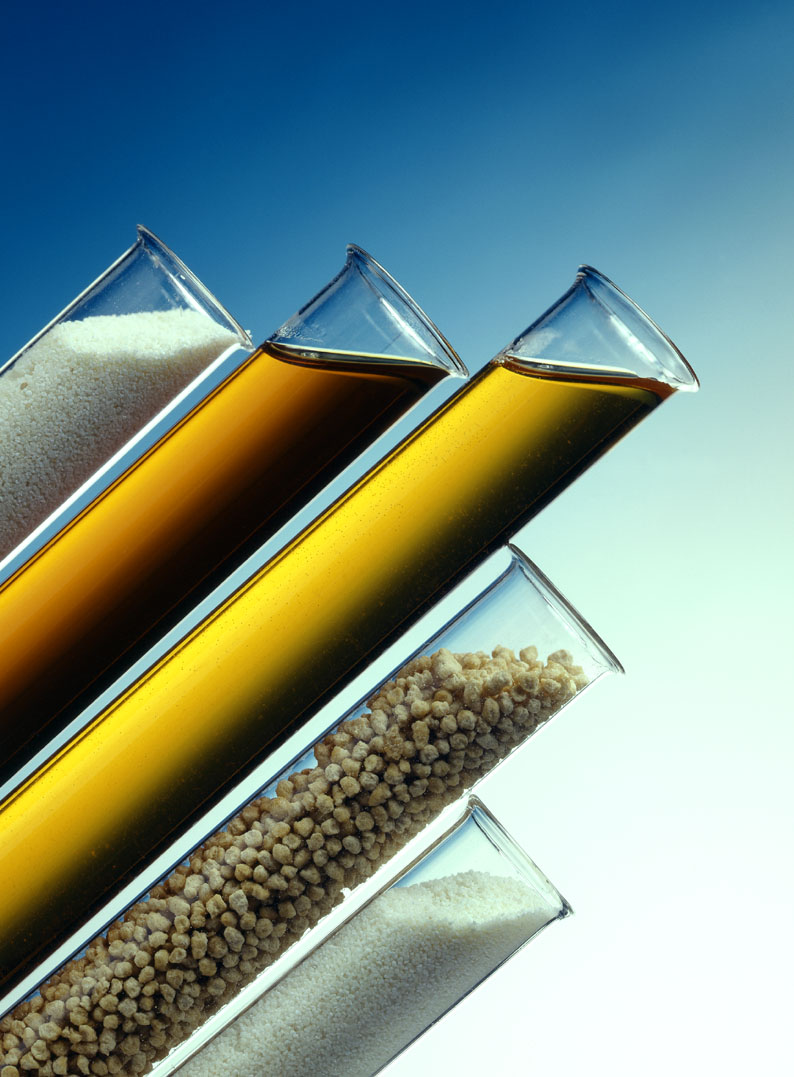
The different forms of emulsifier lecithin – powder, two different concentration liquids, granular and powder lecithin

Food additives are substances added to food to preserve flavor or enhance taste, appearance, or other sensory qualities. Some additives, such as vinegar (pickling), salt (salting), smoke (smoking) and sugar (crystallization), have been used for centuries to preserve food. This allows for longer-lasting foods, such as bacon, sweets, and wines.

With the advent of ultra-processed foods in the late 20th century, many additives having both natural and artificial origin were introduced. Food additives also include substances that may be introduced to food indirectly (called "indirect additives") in the manufacturing process through packaging, storage or transport.

In Europe and internationally, many additives are designated with E numbers, while in the United States, additives in amounts deemed safe for human consumption are designated as GRAS.

== Identification ==
To regulate these additives and inform consumers each additive is assigned a unique number called an "E number", which is used in Europe for all approved additives. This numbering scheme has been adopted and extended by the Codex Alimentarius Commission as the International Numbering System for Food Additives (INS) to internationally identify all additives (INS number.,

E numbers are all prefixed by "E", but countries outside Europe use only the number, whether the additive is approved in Europe or not.

For example, acetic acid is written as E260 on products sold in Europe, but is simply known as additive 260 in some countries. Additive 103, alkannin, is not approved for use in Europe, so does not have an E number, although it is approved for use in Australia and New Zealand. Since 1987, Australia has had an approved system of labelling for additives in packaged foods. Each food additive has to be named or numbered. The numbers are the same as in Europe, but without the prefix "E".

The United States Food and Drug Administration (FDA) lists these items as GRAS; they are listed under both their Chemical Abstracts Service number and FDA regulation under the United States Code of Federal Regulations.

The FDA publishes a list of food additives for all approved ingredients.

=== Categories ===
Food additives can be divided into several groups, although there is some overlap because some additives exert more than one effect. For example, salt is both a preservative as well as a flavor.

- Acidulants confer sour or acid taste. Common acidulants include vinegar, citric acid, tartaric acid, malic acid, fumaric acid, and lactic acid.
- Acidity regulators are used for controlling the pH of foods for stability or to affect activity of enzymes.
- Anticaking agents keep powders such as milk powder from caking or sticking.
- Antifoaming agents reduce or prevent foaming in foods. Foaming agents do the reverse.
- Antioxidants such as vitamin C are preservatives by inhibiting the degradation of food by oxygen.
- Bulking agents such as starch are additives that increase the bulk of a food without affecting its taste.
- Colorings are added to food to replace colors lost during preparation or to make food look more attractive.
- Fortifying agents: Vitamins and minerals may be added to increase the nutritional value
- In contrast to colorings, color retention agents are used to preserve a food's existing color.
- Emulsifiers allow water and oils to remain mixed together in an emulsion, as in mayonnaise, ice cream, and homogenized milk.
- Flavorings are additives that give food a particular taste or smell, and may be derived from natural ingredients or created artificially.

In Europe, flavorings do not have an E-code and they are not considered as food additives.

- Flavor enhancers enhance a food's existing flavors. A popular example is monosodium glutamate. Some flavor enhancers have their own flavors that are independent of the food.
- Flour treatment agents are added to flour to improve its color or its use in baking.
- Glazing agents provide a shiny appearance or protective coating to foods.
- Humectants prevent foods from drying out.
- Tracer gas allows for package integrity testing to prevent foods from being exposed to atmosphere, thus guaranteeing shelf life.
- Preservatives prevent or inhibit spoilage of food due to fungi, bacteria and other microorganisms.
- Stabilizers, thickening and gelling agents, like agar or pectin (used in jam for example) give foods a firmer texture. While they are not true emulsifiers, they help to stabilize emulsions.
- Sweeteners are added to foods for flavoring. Sweeteners other than sugar are added to keep the food energy (calories) low.
- Thickening agents are substances which, when added to the mixture, increase its viscosity without substantially modifying its other properties.
- Bisphenols, phthalates, and perfluoroalkyl chemicals (PFCs) are indirect additives used in manufacturing or packaging. In July 2018 the American Academy of Pediatrics called for more careful study of those three substances, along with nitrates and food coloring, as they might harm children during development.

== Safety and regulation ==
With the increasing use of processed foods since the 19th century, food additives are more widely used. Many countries regulate their use. For example, boric acid was widely used as a food preservative from the 1870s to the 1920s, but was banned after World War I due to its toxicity, as demonstrated in animal and human studies. During World War II, the urgent need for cheap, available food preservatives led to boric acid being used again, but it was finally banned in the 1950s. Such cases led to a general mistrust of food additives, and an application of the precautionary principle led to the conclusion that only additives that are known to be safe should be used in foods. In the United States, this induced adoption of the Delaney clause, an amendment to the Federal Food, Drug, and Cosmetic Act of 1938, stating that no carcinogenic substances may be used as food additives. However, after the banning of cyclamates in the United States and Britain in 1969, saccharin, the only remaining legal artificial sweetener at the time, was found to cause cancer in rats. Widespread public outcry in the United States, partly communicated to Congress by postage-paid postcards supplied in the packaging of sweetened soft drinks, led to the retention of saccharin, despite its violation of the Delaney clause. However, in 2000, saccharin was found to be carcinogenic in rats due only to their unique urine chemistry.

In 2007, Food Standards Australia New Zealand published an official shoppers' guidance with which the concerns of food additives and their labeling are mediated. In the EU, it can take 10 years or more to obtain approval for a new food additive. This includes five years of safety testing, followed by two years for evaluation by the European Food Safety Authority (EFSA) and another three years before the additive receives an EU-wide approval for use in every country in the European Union. Apart from testing and analyzing food products during the whole production process to ensure safety and compliance with regulatory standards, Trading Standards officers (in the UK) protect the public from any illegal use or potentially dangerous mis-use of food additives by performing random testing of food products.

There has been controversy associated with the risks and benefits of food additives. Natural additives may be similarly harmful or be the cause of allergic reactions in certain individuals. For example, safrole was used to flavor root beer until it was shown to be carcinogenic. Due to the application of the Delaney clause, it may not be added to foods, even though it occurs naturally in sassafras and sweet basil.

=== Hyperactivity ===
Although concerns have been expressed about a linkage between additives and hyperactivity, there is no clear evidence of a cause-and-effect relationship.

=== Toxicity assessment ===
In the US, Redbook 2000 provides core FDA guidelines for toxicity testing of direct food additives under 21 CFR § 170.3, including tiered studies and ADME evaluations.

In Europe, the EFSA proposed the tier approach to evaluate the potential toxicity of food additives in 2012. It is based on four dimensions: toxicokinetics (absorption, distribution, metabolism and excretion); genotoxicity; subchronic (at least 90 data) and chronic toxicity and carcinogenity; reproductive and developmental toxicity.

=== Micronutrients ===
A subset of food additives, micronutrients added in food fortification processes preserve nutrient value by providing vitamins and minerals to foods such as flour, cereal, margarine and milk which normally would not retain such high levels. Added ingredients, such as air, bacteria, fungi, and yeast, also contribute manufacturing and flavor qualities, and reduce spoilage.

== Regulation in the United States ==
The United States Food and Drug Administration defines a food additive as "any substance the intended use of which results or may reasonably be expected to result directly or indirectly in its becoming a component or otherwise affecting the characteristics of any food". For a novel food additive to be approved, a food additive approval petition must be submitted to the FDA. The identity of the ingredient, the proposed use in the food system, the technical effect of the ingredient, a method of analysis for the ingredient in foods, information on the manufacturing process, and full safety reports must be defined in a food additive petition. The FDA evaluates the chemical composition of the ingredient, the quantities that would be typically consumed, acute and chronic health impacts, and other safety factors. The FDA reviews the petition prior to market approval of the additive.

== Standardization ==
ISO has published a series of standards regarding the topic and these standards are covered by ICS 67.220.

== See also ==
- Food Chemicals Codex
- Joint FAO/WHO Expert Committee on Food Additives
- List of food labeling regulations
