= Acidity regulator =

Substance which controls acidity or alkalinity

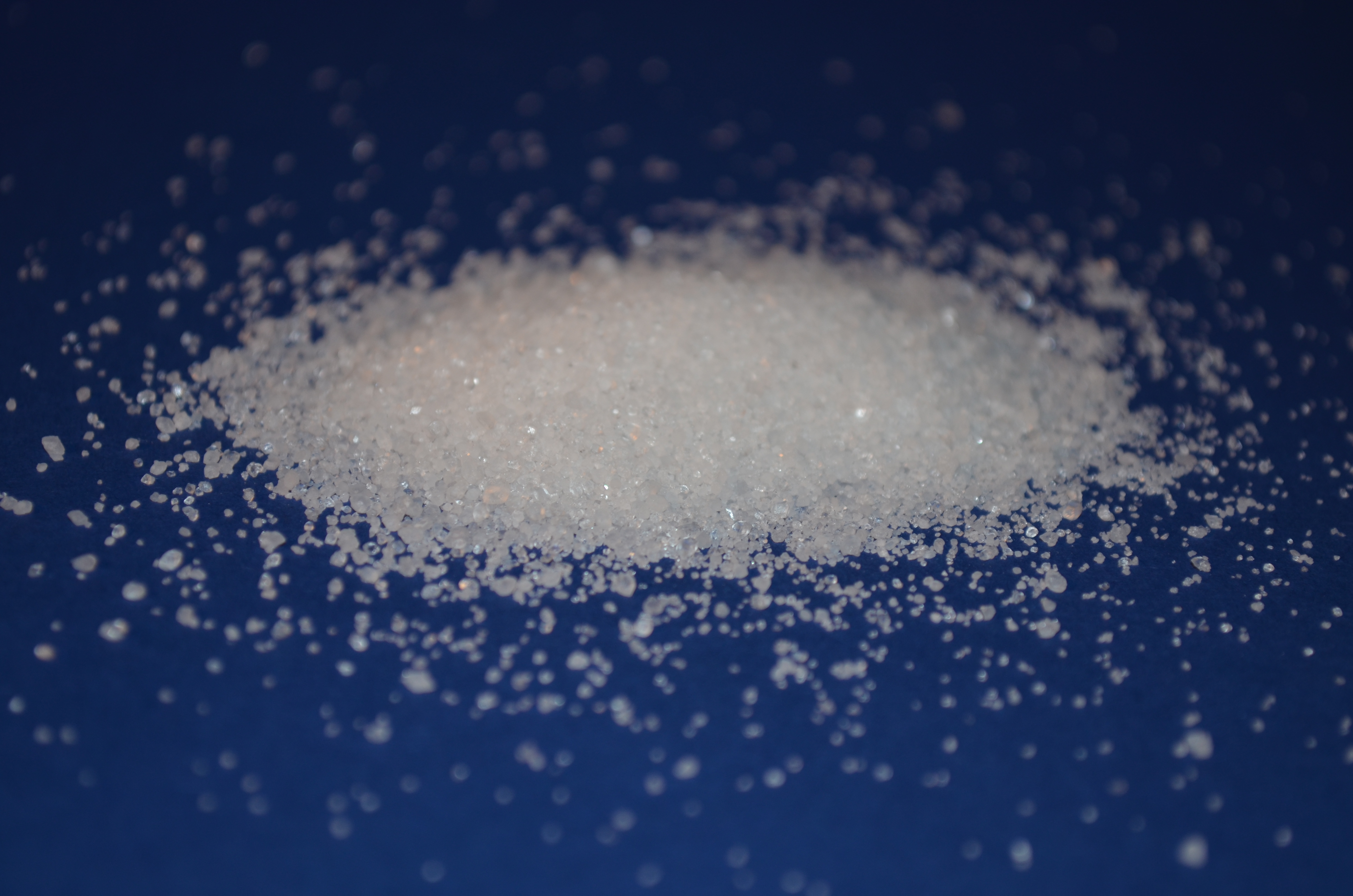
Anhydrous citric acid

Acidity regulators, or pH control agents, are natural or synthesized substances used to change or maintain pH (acidity or basicity). They can be organic or mineral acids, bases, neutralizing agents, or buffering agents. Although many acid regulators are safely used as a food additive, they also have applications in drilling fluids, aquariums, and any environment where a stable pH is necessary.

Both acidity regulator and pH control agent can be used interchangeably. In the context of food-safe substances, however, acidity regulator is typically used over pH control agent.

== List of acidity regulators ==
Below is a list of substances commonly used as acidity regulators. When used in food additives, they may instead be known by their E number. Acidity regulators usually have an E number between 200 and 399, depending on their use case. Typical agents include the following acids and their sodium salts, in order by their E number (if applicable):

- Sorbic acid (E 200)
- Benzoic acid (E 210)
- Acetic acid (E 260)
- Calcium acetate (E 263)
- Lactic acid (E 270)
- Propionic acid (E 280)
- Malic acid (E 296)
- Fumaric acid (E 297)
- Citric acid (E 330)
- Tartaric acid (E 334)

== Culinary use ==
Food-based applications of acidity regulators are used to keep pH stable, as an incorrect pH can result in bacteria growth. They can also be used as a food preservative by means of acidification, which prevents bacteria growth altogether, or as a way to enhance the flavor and/or texture of a food or drink.

Acidity regulators differ from acidulants, which are often acidic but are added to confer sour flavors. They are not intended to stabilize the food, although that can be a collateral benefit.

== Other uses ==
pH control agents are used in fracturing fluids to keep its fluid chemistry consistent, as many of its additives (such as gel polymers) require it to stay at a constant pH range. Without proper pH control, the variability can cause the liquid to destabilize, potentially destroying equipment (via corrosion) and making fracture propagation less efficient.

In industrial plants (namely water treatment plants), pH control agents are used to correct the pH of incoming fluids, and in some cases assist in the disinfection of those fluids. An unstable pH can lead to the corrosion or scaling of equipment. The most common chemicals used to adjust pH in industrial plants are sulfuric acid and sodium hydroxide.

In the fishkeeping hobby, pH control agents may be used to keep the pH within a range suitable for the plants and animals living in the enclosure, especially in cases where the carbonate hardness is low.

== See also ==
- Adipic acid
- Buffer solution
- List of food additives
- Sodium bicarbonate
