= Sulfite food and beverage additives =

Food additives

The topic of sulfite food and beverage additives covers the application of sulfites in food chemistry. "Sulfite" is jargon that encompasses a variety of materials that are commonly used as preservatives or food additive in the production of diverse foods and beverages. Although sulfite salts are relatively nontoxic, their use has led to controversy, resulting in extensive regulations. Sulfites are a source of sulfur dioxide (SO_{2}), a bactericide.

== Chemical principles ==
=== Inventory ===
- sodium bisulfite, NaHSO_{3}: ill-defined, widely used source of bisulfite, which predominates below pH 7
- sodium metabisulfite, Na_{2}S_{2}O_{5}: well-defined, widely used source of bisulfite, which predominates below pH 7
- potassium bisulfite, KHSO_{3}: ill-defined, widely used source of bisulfite, which predominates below pH 7
- potassium metabisulfite, K_{2}S_{2}O_{5},: well-defined, widely used source of bisulfite, which predominates below pH 7
- sodium sulfite, Na_{2}SO_{3}: well-defined, widely used source of sulfite, which predominates above pH 7
- potassium sulfite, K_{2}SO_{3}: well-defined, widely used source of sulfite, which predominates above pH 7

=== Descriptive chemistry ===
Sulfite is SO_{3}^{2-}, available as its sodium and potassium salts, Na_{2}SO_{3} and K_{2}SO_{3}, respectively. When dissolved in water, these salts react with oxygen to give the corresponding sulfate salts, which are innocuous. Sodium sulfite used industrial as a corrosion inhibitor/oxygen scavenger.

Monoprotonation of sulfite gives HSO_{3}^{−}, which is called bisulfite. The sodium and potassium salts of bisulfite are not available, but solid and solutions of the approximate formula NaHSO_{3} and KHSO_{3} are widely marketed as sodium bisulfite and potassium bisulfite. Closely related are the metabisulfite salts with formula Na_{2}S_{2}O_{5} and K_{2}S_{2}O_{5}, respectively sodium metabisulfite and potassium metabisulfite. These salts dissolve to give solutions containing the bisulfite ion.

== E numbers ==
E numbers for sulfites as food additives are:

E150b	Caustic sulfite caramel
E150d	Sulfite ammonia caramel
E220	Sulfur dioxide
E221	Sodium sulfite
E222	Sodium bisulfite (sodium hydrogen sulfite)
E223	Sodium metabisulfite
E224	Potassium metabisulfite
E225	Potassium sulfite
E226	Calcium sulfite
E227	Calcium hydrogen sulfite (preservative)
E228	Potassium hydrogen sulfite

== Use in wine and beer industry ==
Sulfites occur naturally in wines to some extent. Sulfites are commonly introduced to arrest fermentation at a desired time, and may also be added to wine as preservatives to prevent spoilage and oxidation at several stages of the winemaking. Sulfur dioxide (SO_{2}) protects wine from not only oxidation, but also from bacteria. Without sulfites, grape juice would quickly turn to vinegar.

Organic wines are not necessarily sulfite-free, but generally have lower amounts and regulations stipulate lower maximum sulfite contents for these wines. In general, white wines contain more sulfites than red wines and sweeter wines contain more sulfites than drier ones.

The compound sodium metabisulfite is used in almost all commercial wines to prevent oxidation and preserve flavor, sodium bisulfite is sold by some home winemaking suppliers for the same purpose. In fruit canning, sodium bisulfite is used to prevent browning (caused by oxidation) and to kill microbes. The sulfur dioxide released by these salts kills yeasts, fungi, and bacteria in the grape juice before fermentation. Once the levels of sulfur dioxide have subsided (about 24 hours), fresh yeast is added for fermentation.

It is later added to bottled wine to prevent the formation of vinegar if bacteria are present, and to protect the color, aroma and flavor of the wine from oxidation, which causes browning and other chemical changes.

Sodium metabisulfite and potassium metabisulfite are the primary ingredients in Campden tablets, used for wine and beer making. Most beers no longer contain sulfites, although some alcoholic ciders contain them.

== Other foods ==
Shrimp are sometimes treated with sulfites on fishing vessels, the chemical may not appear on the label.

== Vegetables and fruit ==
Sulfites are often used as preservatives in dried fruits, preserved radish, and dried potato products. Sodium bisulfite is also added to leafy green vegetables in salad bars and elsewhere, to preserve freshness, under names like LeafGreen. It can be used to preserve color of some fruits, such as bananas.

== Regulation and safety ==
Australia and New Zealand

It is approved for use in Australia and New Zealand

In Australia and New Zealand, sulfites must be declared in the statement of ingredients when present in packaged foods in concentrations of 10 mg/kg (ppm) or more as an ingredient; or as an ingredient of a compound ingredient; or as a food additive or component of a food additive; or as a processing aid or component of a processing aid.

Canada

Sulfites that can be added to foods in Canada are potassium bisulfite, potassium metabisulfite, sodium bisulfite, sodium dithionite, sodium metabisulfite, sodium sulfite, sulfur dioxide and sulfurous acid. These can also be declared using the common names sulfites, sulfates, sulfiting agents.

EU

In the European Union, "EU law requires food labels to indicate "contains sulfites" (when exceeding 10 milligrams per kilogram or per litre) without specifying the amount".

In the European Union an equivalent regulation came into force in November 2005. In 2012, a new regulation for organic wines came into force.

UK

In the United Kingdom, similar laws to the EU apply. Bottles of wine that contain over 10 mg/L (ppm) of sulfites are required to bear "contains sulphites" on the label. This does not differ whether sulfites are naturally occurring or added in the winemaking process.

US

In 1986, the U.S. Food and Drug Administration banned the addition of sulfites to all fresh fruit and vegetables that are eaten raw.

In 1986, the U.S. Food and Drug Administration banned the use of sulfites as preservatives on foods intended to be eaten fresh (such as salad ingredients). This has contributed to the increased use of erythorbic acid and its salts as preservatives.

Generally, U.S. labeling regulations do not require products to indicate the presence of sulfites in foods unless it is added specifically as a preservative; still, many companies voluntarily label sulfite-containing foods. Sulfites used in food processing (but not as a preservative) are required to be listed if they are not incidental additives (21 CFR 101.100(a)(3)), and if there are more than 10 ppm in the finished product (21 CFR 101.100(a)(4)) On July 8, 1986, sodium bisulfite (and other sulfites : "The chemicals affected by the order are sulfur dioxide, sodium sulfite, sodium bisulfite, potassium bisulfite, sodium metabisulfite and potassium metabisulfite.") was banned from use by the U.S. FDA on fresh fruits and vegetables following the deaths of 13 people and many illnesses, mainly among asthmatics.

In the United States, wines bottled after mid-1987 must have a label stating that they contain sulfites if they contain more than 10 parts per million (ppm).

== Safety ==
=== Toxicity ===
Sodium bisulfite has low toxicity, 130 mg/kg (mice, intravenous). The acceptable daily intake is up to 0.7 milligrams (Sulfur dioxide equivalent) per kilogram of body weight. Sodium metabisulfite oxidizes in the liver to harmless sulfate which is excreted in the urine.

=== Other health effects ===
It may cause adverse reactions in those who are sensitive to sulfites, including respiratory reactions in asthmatics, anaphylaxis, and other allergic reactions in sensitive individuals.

Adverse reactions to sulfites appear to be very rare in the general population. An adverse reaction to sulfite is not a true allergy. Chronic skin conditions in the hands, perineum, and face have been reported in individuals that regularly use cosmetics or medications containing sulfites. Occupational exposure to sulfites has been reported to cause persistent skin symptoms.

Breathing difficulty can commence within minutes after eating a food containing sulfites. Asthmatics may experience asthma attacks from sulfite fumes as well. Other potential symptoms include sneezing, swelling of the throat, hives, and migraine.

A 2017 study has shown negative impacts from sulfites on bacteria found in the human microbiome.
