= Disulfite =

Disulfite ion
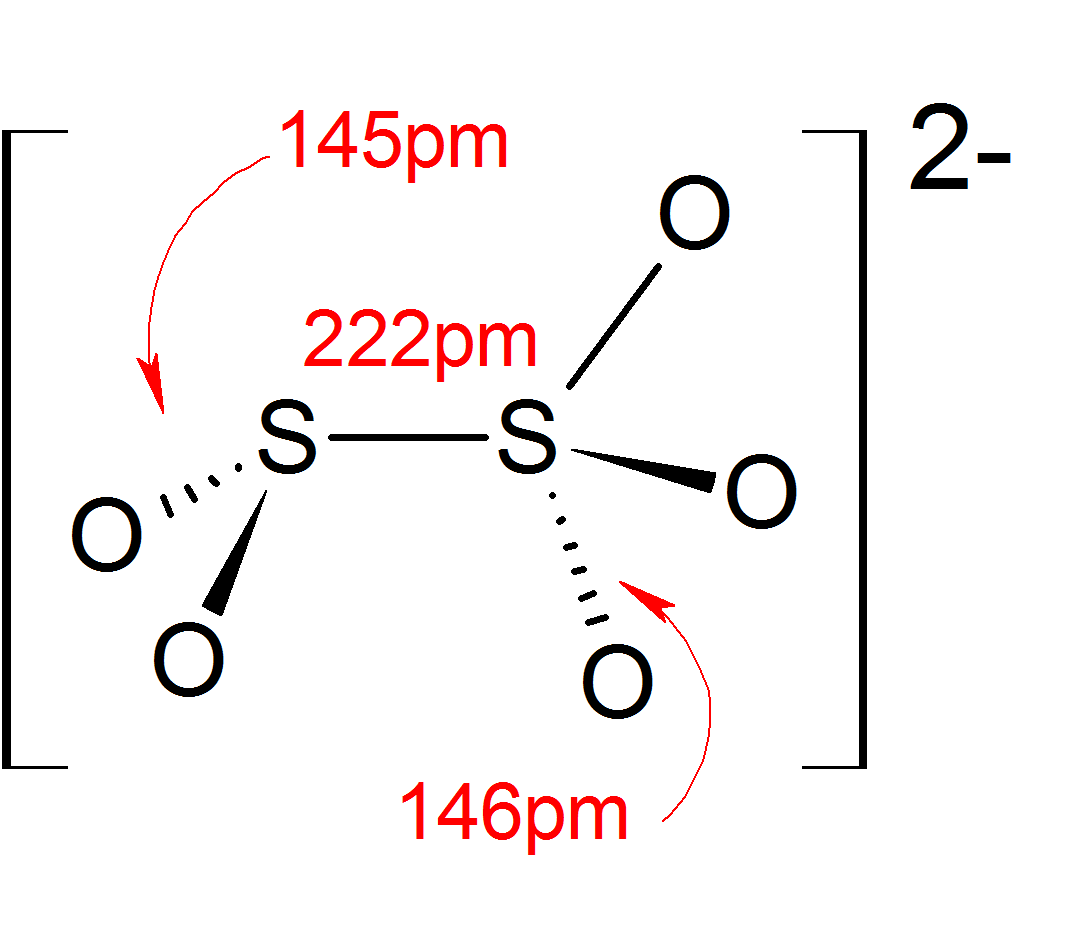

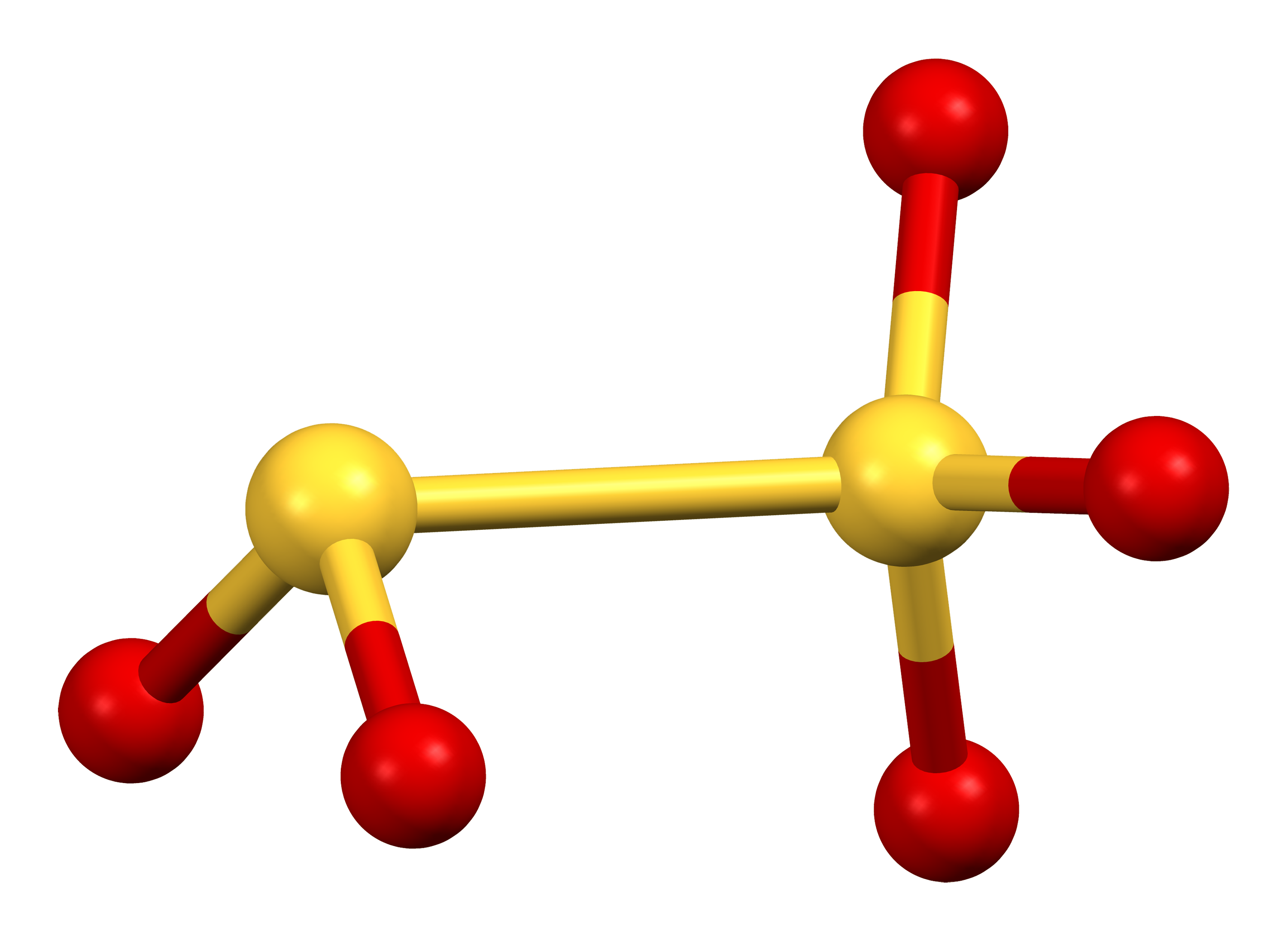

Names
- IUPAC name disulfite
- Systematic IUPAC name pentaoxido-1κ^{3}O,2κ^{2}O-disulfate(S—S)(2−)
- Other names metabisulfite ion pyrosulfite

Identifiers
CAS Number	23134-05-6
3D model (JSmol)	Interactive image
ChemSpider	140610
PubChem CID	159940
UNII	7992SO049K
CompTox Dashboard (EPA)	DTXSID70945813
- InChI: InChI=1S/H2O5S2/c1-6(2)7(3,4)5/h(H,1,2)(H,3,4,5)/p-2 Key: WBZKQQHYRPRKNJ-UHFFFAOYSA-L
- SMILES: [O-][S+2]([O-])([O-])[S+]([O-])[O-]

Properties
Chemical formula	S_{2}O_{5}^{2−}
Conjugate acid	Disulfurous acid
- Except where otherwise noted, data are given for materials in their standard state (at 25 °C [77 °F], 100 kPa). verify (what is ?) Infobox references

A disulfite, commonly known as metabisulfite or pyrosulfite, is a chemical compound containing the ion S_{2}O_{5}^{2−}. It is a colorless dianion that is primarily marketed in the form of sodium metabisulfite or potassium metabisulfite. When dissolved in water, these salts release the hydrogensulfite HSO_{3}^{−} anion. These salts act equivalently to sodium hydrogensulfite or potassium hydrogensulfite.

== Structure ==
In contrast to disulfate (S_{2}O_{7}^{2−}), disulfite ion (S_{2}O_{5}^{2−}) has an unsymmetrical structure with an S-S bond. The oxidation state of the sulfur atom bonded to 3 oxygen atoms is +5 while oxidation number of other sulfur atom is +3.

The anion consists of an SO_{2} group linked to an SO_{3} group, with the negative charge more localized on the SO_{3} end. The S–S bond length is 2.22 Å, and the "thionate" and "thionite" S–O distances are 1.46 and 1.50 Å respectively.

=== Production ===
Salts of disulfite ion are produced by dehydration of salts of hydrogensulfite ion (HSO_{3}^{−}). When solutions of sodium hydrogensulfite or potassium hydrogensulfite are evaporated, sodium metabisulfite and potassium metabisulfite result.

2 HSO_{3}^{−} S_{2}O_{5}^{2−} + H_{2}O

Although the equilibrium lies far to the left, evaporation of a bisulfite salt will produce a substantial amount of disulfite.

Disulfite is the conjugate base of disulfurous acid (pyrosulfurous acid), which originates from sulfurous acid in accordance with the dehydration reaction above:

2 H_{2}SO_{3} → 2 HSO_{3}^{−} + 2 H^{+} → H_{2}S_{2}O_{5} + H_{2}O

The disulfite ion also arises from the addition of sulfur dioxide to the sulfite ion:

HSO_{3}^{−} SO_{3}^{2−} + H^{+} SO_{3}^{2−} + SO_{2} S_{2}O_{5}^{2−}

== Use ==
Disulfite salts are used for preserving food and beverages and as antioxidants, with the main species used for this purpose being sodium metabisulfite (E223) and potassium metabisulfite (E224). Sulfites are implicated in asthmatic reactions and may also cause symptoms in non-asthmatic individuals, namely dermatitis, urticaria, flushing, hypotension, abdominal pain and diarrhea, and even life-threatening anaphylaxis.
