= Sulfite =

Anion of sulfur with 3 oxygen atoms

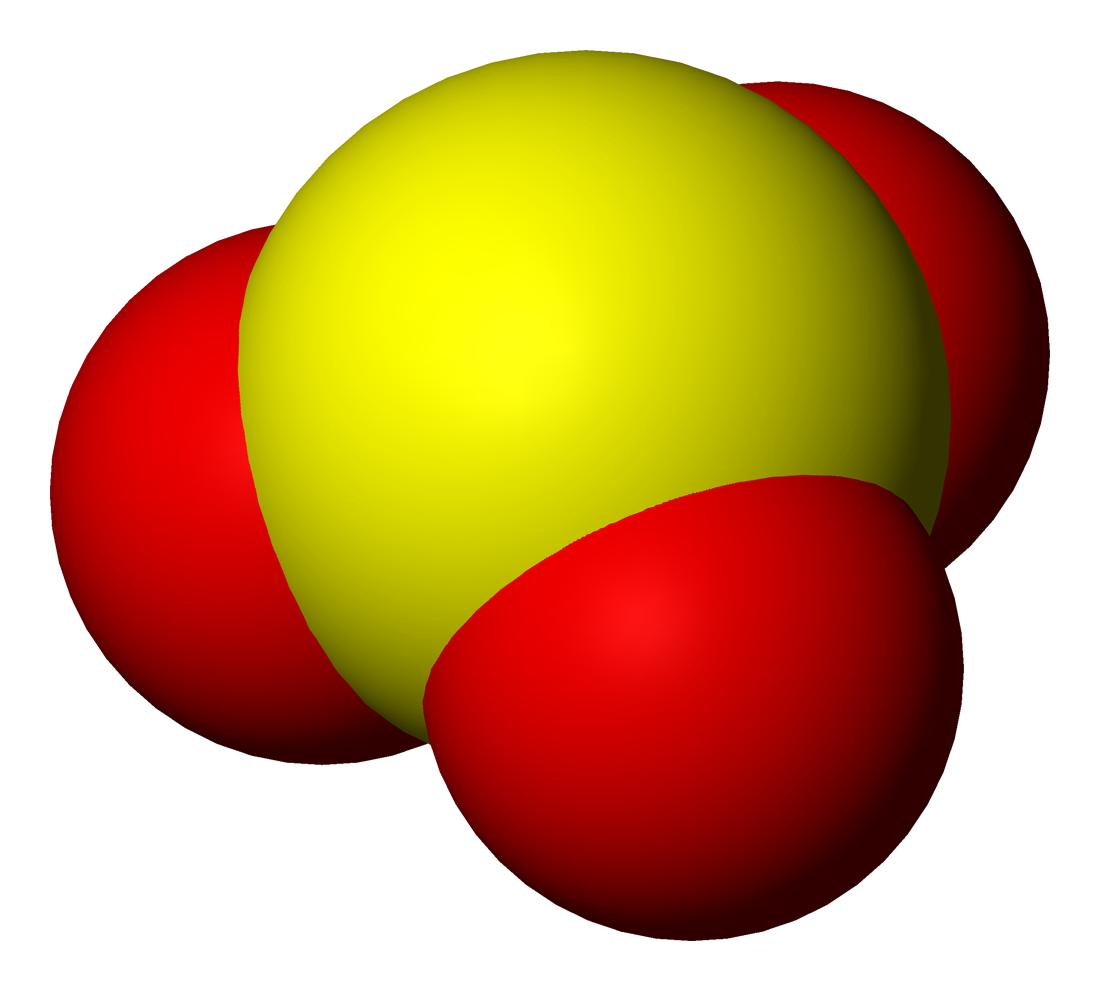
- A space-filling model of the sulfite anion.

Identifiers
CAS Number	14265-45-3
3D model (JSmol)	Interactive image
ChEBI	CHEBI:17359
ChemSpider	1068
Gmelin Reference	1449
PubChem CID	1099
UNII	15744271E9
- InChI: InChI=1S/H2O3S/c1-4(2)3/h(H2,1,2,3)/p-2 Key: LSNNMFCWUKXFEE-UHFFFAOYSA-L
- SMILES: [O-]S(=O)[O-]

Properties
Chemical formula	SO_{3}^{2−}

Related compounds
Related ions	bisulfite; disulfite; sulfate; selenite; tellurite
Related compounds	sulfur dioxide; sulfur trioxide; sulfurous acid
- Except where otherwise noted, data are given for materials in their standard state (at 25 °C [77 °F], 100 kPa). Infobox references

Sulfites or sulphites are compounds that contain the sulfite ion (systematic name: sulfate(IV) ion), SO_{3}^{2−}. The sulfite ion is the conjugate base of bisulfite. Although its acid (sulfurous acid) is elusive, its salts are widely used.

Sulfites are substances that naturally occur in some foods and the human body. They are also used as regulated food additives. When in food or drink, sulfites are often lumped together with sulfur dioxide.

== Structure ==
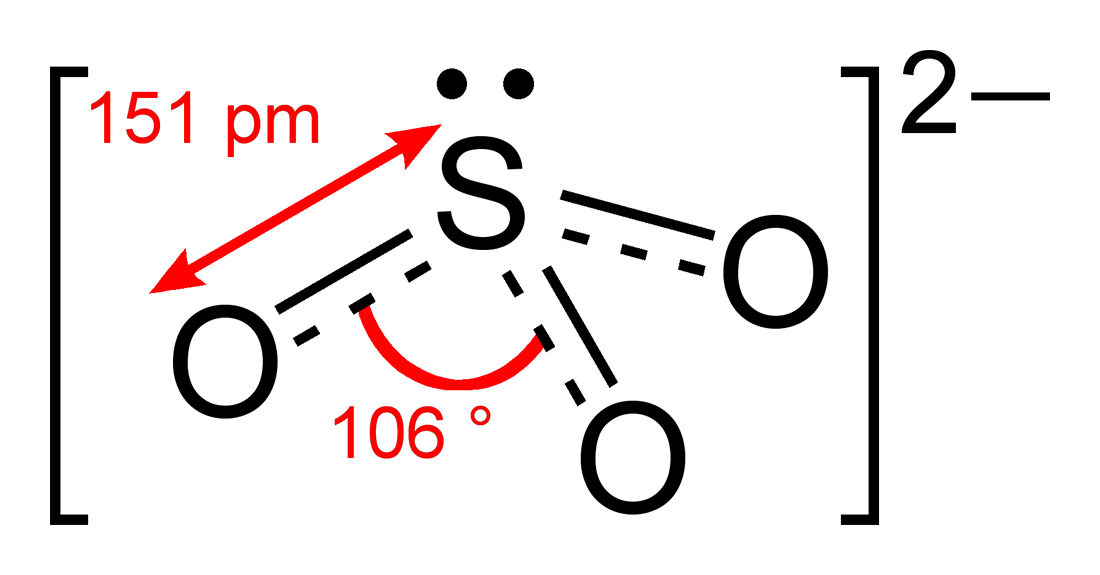
The structure of the sulfite anion

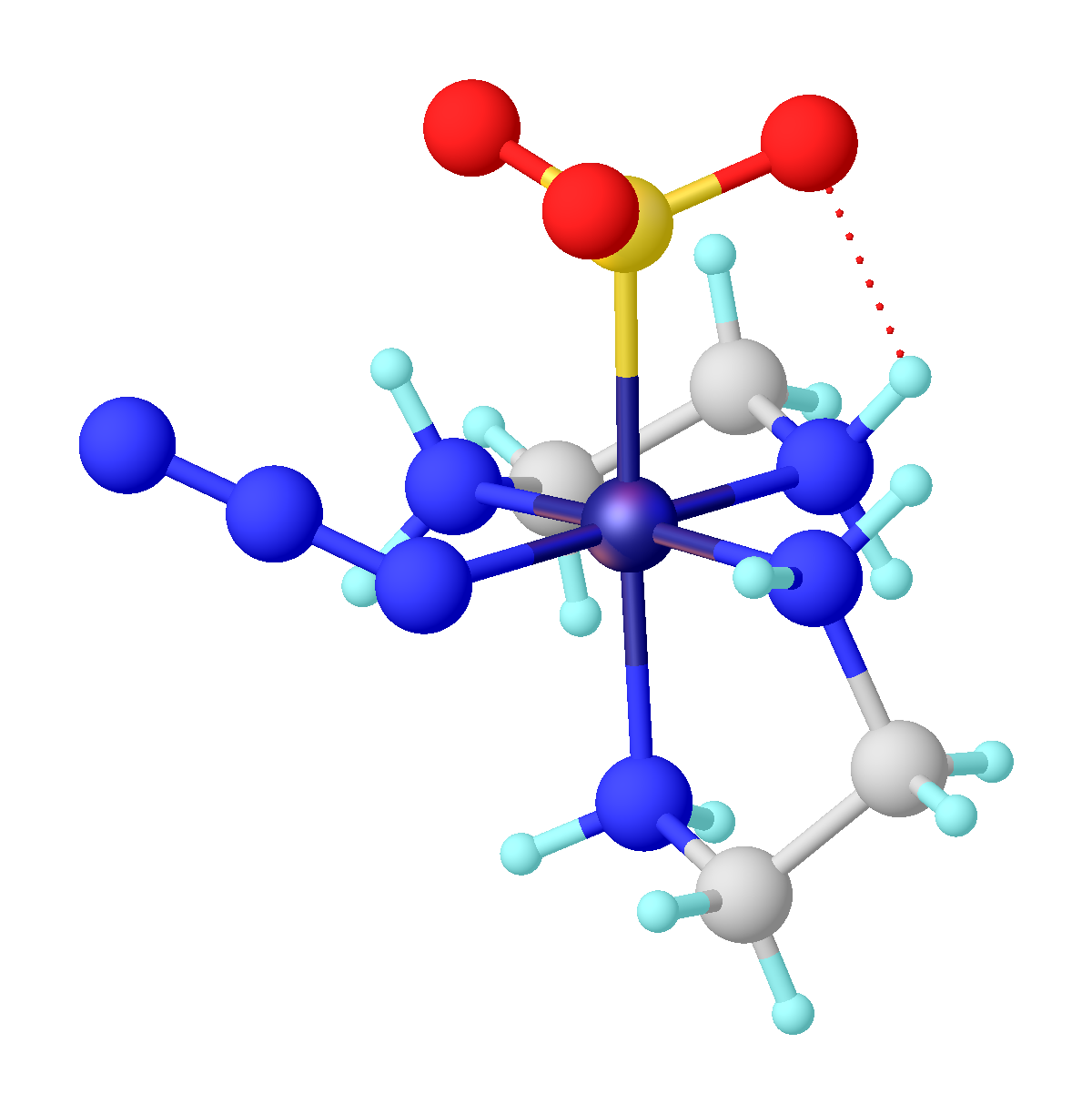
Sulfite is a ligand in coordination chemistry. The structure of Co(ethylenediamine)_{2}(SO_{3})N_{3}.

The structure of the sulfite anion can be described with three equivalent resonance structures. In each resonance structure, the sulfur atom is double-bonded to one oxygen atom with a formal charge of zero (neutral), and sulfur is singly bonded to the other two oxygen atoms, which each carry a formal charge of −1, together accounting for the −2 charge on the anion. There is also a non-bonded lone pair on the sulfur, so the structure predicted by VSEPR theory is trigonal pyramidal, as in ammonia (NH_{3}). In the hybrid resonance structure, the S−O bonds are equivalently of bond order one and one-third.

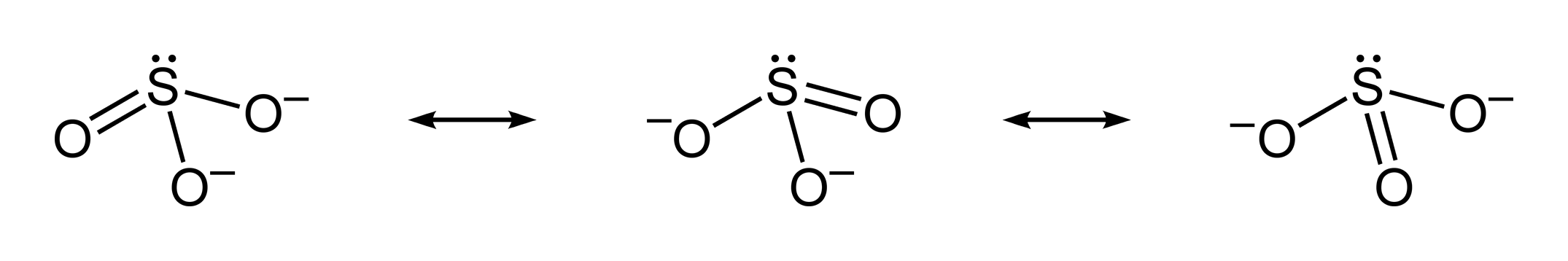
Resonance structures of the sulfite ion

Evidence from ^{17}O NMR spectroscopic data suggests that protonation of the sulfite ion gives a mixture of isomers:

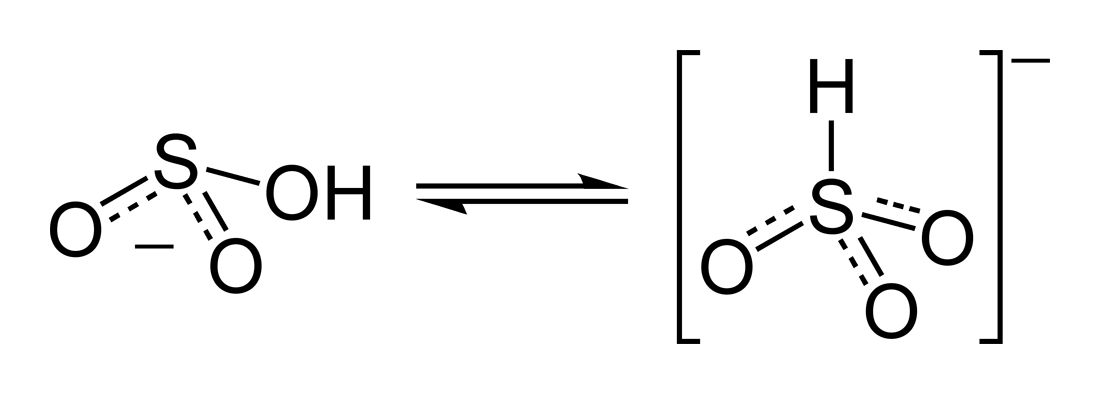

== Commercial uses ==
Sulfites are used as a food preservative or enhancer. They may come in various forms, such as:

- Sulfur dioxide, which is not a sulfite, but a closely related chemical oxide
- Potassium bisulfite or potassium metabisulfite
- Sodium bisulfite, sodium metabisulfite or sodium sulfite

=== Wine ===
Sulfites occur naturally in all wines to some extent. Sulfites are commonly introduced to arrest fermentation at a desired time, and may also be added to wine as preservatives to prevent spoilage and oxidation at several stages of the winemaking. Sulfur dioxide (SO_{2}) protects wine not only from oxidation, but also from bacteria.

Organic wines are not necessarily sulfite-free, but generally have lower amounts and regulations stipulate lower maximum sulfite contents for these wines. In general, white wines contain more sulfites than red wines and sweeter wines contain more sulfites than drier ones.

In the United States, wines bottled after mid-1987 must have a label stating that they contain sulfites if they contain more than 10 parts per million (ppm). In the European Union an equivalent regulation came into force in November 2005. This includes sulfur dioxide, and the limit is on the milligrams per kilogram or per litre of sulfur dioxide equivalent. In 2012, a new EU regulation for organic wines came into force. In the United Kingdom, similar laws apply. Bottles of wine that contain over 10 mg/L (ppm) of "sulfites" (or sulfur dioxide) are required to bear "contains sulphites" on the label. This does not differ if sulfites are naturally occurring or added in the winemaking process.

=== Other foods ===
Sulfites are often used as preservatives in dried fruits, preserved radish, and dried potato products.

Most beers no longer contain sulfites, although some alcoholic ciders contain them. Although shrimp are sometimes treated with sulfites on fishing vessels, the chemical may not appear on the label. In 1986, the Food and Drug Administration in the United States banned the addition of sulfites to all fresh fruit and vegetables that are eaten raw.

=== E numbers ===
E numbers (European food additive codes) for sulfites as preservative food additives are:

E220	Sulfur dioxide
E221	Sodium sulfite
E222	Sodium bisulfite (sodium hydrogen sulfite)
E223	Sodium metabisulfite
E224	Potassium metabisulfite
E225	Potassium sulfite
E226	Calcium sulfite
E227	Calcium hydrogen sulfite
E228	Potassium hydrogen sulfite

In addition, two non-preservative food additives are produced by reacting with sulfite and hence have "sulfite" in the name:

E150b	Caustic sulfite caramel
E150d	Sulfite ammonia caramel

Both are types of caramel coloring. The sulfite in these additives have a tight chemical bond with the caramel and are not easily freed.

== Health effects ==
Allergic reactions to sulfites appear to be very rare in the general population, but more common in hyperallergic individuals.

Sulfites are counted among the top nine food allergens, but a reaction to sulfite is seldom a true allergy. Some people have positive skin allergy tests to sulfites indicating true (IgE-mediated) allergy. Chronic skin conditions in the hands, perineum, and face have been reported in individuals that regularly use cosmetics or medications containing sulfites. Occupational exposure to sulfites has been reported to cause persistent skin symptoms.

It may cause breathing difficulty within minutes after eating a food containing it. Asthmatics and possibly people with salicylate sensitivity (or aspirin sensitivity) are at an elevated risk for reaction to sulfites. Anaphylaxis and life-threatening reactions are rare. Other potential symptoms include sneezing, swelling of the throat, hives, and migraine.

A 2017 study has shown negative impacts of sulfites on bacteria found in the human microbiome.

== Use and labeling regulations ==
In 1986, the U.S. Food and Drug Administration banned the use of sulfites as preservatives on foods intended to be eaten fresh (such as salad ingredients). This has contributed to the increased use of erythorbic acid and its salts as preservatives. They also cannot be added to foods high in vitamin B1 such as meats because sulfites can destroy vitamin B1 from foods

Generally, U.S. labeling regulations do not require products to indicate the presence of sulfites in foods unless it is added specifically as a preservative; still, many companies voluntarily label sulfite-containing foods. Sulfites used in food processing (but not as a preservative) are required to be listed if they are not incidental additives (21 CFR 101.100(a)(3)), and if there are more than 10 ppm in the finished product (21 CFR 101.100(a)(4))

Sulfites that are allowed to be added in food in the US are sulfur dioxide, sodium sulfite, sodium bisulfite, potassium bisulfite, sodium metabisulfite, and potassium metabisulfite. Products likely to contain sulfites at less than 10 ppm (fruits and alcoholic beverages) do not require ingredients labels, and the presence of sulfites usually is undisclosed.

In Australia and New Zealand, sulfites must be declared in the statement of ingredients when present in packaged foods in concentrations of 10 mg/kg (ppm) or more as an ingredient; or as an ingredient of a compound ingredient; or as a food additive or component of a food additive; or as a processing aid or component of a processing aid.

Sulfites that can be added to foods in Canada are potassium bisulfite, potassium metabisulfite, sodium bisulfite, sodium dithionite, sodium metabisulfite, sodium sulfite, sulfur dioxide and sulfurous acid. These can also be declared using the common names sulfites, sulfates, sulfiting agents.

In the European Union, "EU law requires food labels to indicate "contains sulfites" (when exceeding 10 milligrams per kilogram or per litre) without specifying the amount".

== Metabolic diseases ==
People with molybdenum cofactor deficiency cannot perform a number of metabolic functions, including the breakdown of sulfite. This causes an accumulation of sulfite in the blood, leading to neurological damage and death within months of birth unless treated. Treatment in the form of fosdenopterin, requiring daily injections, became available in 2009.

== See also ==
- HSO_{3}^{−} bisulfite ion
- H_{2}SO_{3} sulfurous acid
- SO_{2} sulfur dioxide
- Sulfite esters
- Other sulfur oxyacids
- Sulfur trioxide (uncharged SO_{3}; a sulfate precursor)
- Grant v The Australian Knitting Mills
- Transition metal sulfito complex
