= Antichlor =

Agent used to decompose residual chlorine after bleaching

An antichlor is a substance used to decompose residual hypochlorite or chlorine after chlorine-based bleaching, in order to prevent ongoing reactions with, and therefore damage to, the material that has been bleached. Antichlors include sodium bisulfite, potassium bisulfite, sodium metabisulfite, sodium thiosulfate, and hydrogen peroxide.

In the textile industry, the antichlor is usually added right before the end of the bleaching process. Antichlors are used mainly on fiber, textiles, and paper pulp. Rinsing with water should follow the antichlor treatment in order to flush out by-products of the procedure. For household use, rinsing both before and after use is recommended.

Hydrogen peroxide is by itself a strong bleaching agent and should be used only in diluted form, such as a 3% solution in water. Hypochlorite plus peroxide releases triplet oxygen, which is itself a bleaching agent, but is short-lived in water solution. Reacting large amounts of peroxide can release enough oxygen to create a fire or explosion hazard.

Antichlors are sometimes added to shampoos for treating hair after swimming in chlorinated water.
