= Calcium sulfite =

Names
- IUPAC name Calcium sulfite
- Other names: Sulfurous acid, calcium salt (1:1); E226

Identifiers
CAS Number	10257-55-3 (anhydrous); 72878-03-6 (tetrahydrate); 29501-28-8 (hemihydrate)
3D model (JSmol)	Interactive image
ChemSpider	8329549
ECHA InfoCard	100.030.529
EC Number	233-596-8
E number	E226 (preservatives)
PubChem CID	10154041
UNII	7078964UQP
CompTox Dashboard (EPA)	DTXSID10883104
- InChI: InChI=1S/Ca.H2O3S/c;1-4(2)3/h;(H2,1,2,3)/q+2;/p-2; InChI=1/Ca.H2O3S/c;1-4(2)3/h;(H2,1,2,3)/q+2;/p-2 Key: GBAOBIBJACZTNA-NUQVWONBAU
- SMILES: [Ca+2].[O-]S([O-])=O

Properties
Chemical formula	CaSO_{3}
Molar mass	120.17 g/mol
Appearance	White solid
Melting point	600 °C (1,112 °F; 873 K)
Solubility in water	4.3 mg/100 mL (18 °C)
Solubility product (K_{sp})	3.1×10^{−7}

Hazards
Flash point	Non-flammable

Related compounds
Other anions	Calcium sulfate
Other cations	Sodium sulfite
- Except where otherwise noted, data are given for materials in their standard state (at 25 °C [77 °F], 100 kPa). verify (what is ?) Infobox references

Calcium sulfite, or calcium sulphite, is a chemical compound, the calcium salt of sulfite with the formula CaSO_{3}·x(H_{2}O). Two crystalline forms are known, the hemihydrate and the tetrahydrate, respectively CaSO_{3}·½(H_{2}O) and CaSO_{3}·4(H_{2}O). All forms are white solids. It is most notable as the product of flue-gas desulfurization.

== Production ==
It is produced on a large scale by flue gas desulfurization (FGD). When coal or other fossil fuel is burned, the byproduct is known as flue gas. Flue gas often contains SO_{2}, whose emission is often regulated to prevent acid rain. Sulfur dioxide is scrubbed before the remaining gases are emitted through the chimney stack. An economical way of scrubbing SO_{2} from flue gases is by treating the effluent with Ca(OH)_{2} hydrated lime or CaCO_{3} limestone.

Scrubbing with limestone follows the following idealized reaction:

SO_{2} + CaCO_{3} → CaSO_{3} + CO_{2}

Scrubbing with hydrated lime follows the following idealized reaction:

SO_{2} + Ca(OH)_{2} → CaSO_{3} + H_{2}O

The resulting calcium sulfite oxidizes in air to give gypsum:

2 CaSO_{3} + O_{2} → 2 CaSO_{4}

The gypsum, if sufficiently pure, is marketable as a building material.

== Uses ==
=== Water treatment ===
Used in some shower filters to remove chlorine due to its reducing properties and slow dissolution in water.

=== Drywall ===
Calcium sulfite is generated as the intermediate in the production of gypsum, which is the main component of drywall. A typical US home contains 7 metric tons of such drywall gypsum board.

=== Food additive ===
As a food additive it is used as a preservative under the E number E226. Along with other antioxidant sulfites, it is commonly used in preserving wine, cider, fruit juice, canned fruit and vegetables. Sulfites are strong reducers in solution, they act as oxygen scavenger antioxidants to preserve food, but labeling is required as some individuals might be hypersensitive.

=== Wood pulp production ===
Chemical wood pulping is the removal of cellulose from wood by dissolving the lignin that binds the cellulose together. Calcium sulfite can be used in the production of wood pulp through the sulfite process, as an alternative to the Kraft process that uses hydroxides and sulfides instead of sulfites. Calcium sulfite was used, but has been largely replaced by magnesium and sodium sulfites and bisulfites to attack the lignin.

=== Gypsum ===
There is a possibility to use calcium sulfite to produce gypsum by oxidizing (adding O_{2}) it in water mixture with the manganese (Mn^{2+}) cation or sulfuric acid catalyzers.

== Structure ==
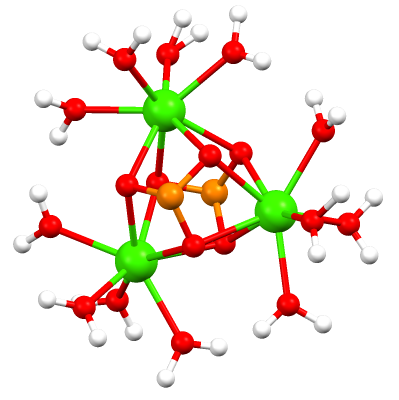
Structure of the [Ca_{3}(SO_{3})_{2}(H_{2}O)_{12}]^{2+} cage in calcium sulfite tetrahydrate.

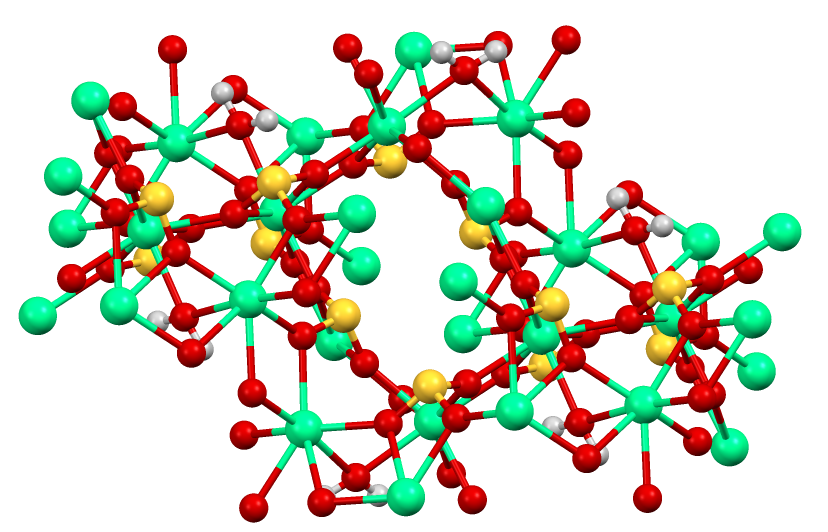
Structure of anhydrous CaSO_{3}.

X-ray crystallography shows that anhydrous calcium sulfite has a complicated polymeric structure. The tetrahydrate crystallizes as a solid solution of Ca_{3}(SO_{3})2(SO_{4})^{.}12H_{2}O and Ca_{3}(SO_{3})2(SO_{3})^{.}12H_{2}O. The mixed sulfite-sulfate represents an intermediate in the oxidation of the sulfite to the sulfate, as is practiced in the production of gypsum. This solid solution consists of [Ca_{3}(SO_{3})_{2}(H_{2}O)_{12}]^{2+} cations and either sulfite or sulfate as the anion. These crystallographic studies confirm that sulfite anion adopts a pyramidal geometry.

== Natural occurrence ==
Calcium sulfite(III) hemihydrate occurs in the nature as the rare mineral hannebachite.

== See also ==
- Sulfite
- Magnesium sulfite
- Sodium sulfite
- Sodium bisulfite
- Sodium metabisulfite
- Campden tablet
