= Hair dye stripping =

Removing deposited color from hair

Hair dye stripping is a process used to rid the hair of unwanted deposited color.

== Hair dye chemistry ==
Most modern hair coloring relies on oxidative reactions. Despite changes in commercial formulations over time, the underlying chemistry has remained largely the same and commonly involves aromatic amines that function as dye precursors and coupling agents. These compounds are typically associated with products marketed as permanent hair dyes, although some semi-permanent formulations also rely on oxidative dye chemistry.

Oxidative hair dye systems generally contain primary, secondary, or tertiary amines at concentrations of approximately 0.1–3%. These intermediates are relatively small and lipid-soluble molecules, properties that enable them to penetrate the hair shaft and, to some extent, the skin. Because oxidative dyes form larger colored molecules within the hair shaft through chemical reactions with oxidizing agents, the resulting pigments become trapped within the hair structure, producing longer-lasting coloration.

== Procedure ==
Hair dye stripping is a chemical process involving the application of a sulfur-based product to hair in order to remove deposited color. Hair dye strippers raise sulfite levels to make hair more porous and reverse the oxidation of color molecules. This breaks the bonds dyes form between one another and the hair shaft that were formed by oxidizing small hair color intermediates, shrinking the molecules and allowing hair color to be washed out of the hair. Because of the chemical nature of hair dye strippers, they are effective on both newly dyed hair and older dye.

Note that this type of color correction is ineffective on hair lightened with hydrogen peroxide, as hair bleaching is an irreversible chemical reaction that oxidizes hair's melanin, effectively rendering it colorless. Most color depositing dyes use a weak hydrogen peroxide-based developer, or oxidizing agent, so results may not match natural hair color.

Regulation

In the United States, color additives used in cosmetics and other products regulated by the U.S. Food and Drug Administration (FDA) must receive premarket approval. Approved color additives are listed in federal regulations that specify their permitted uses, purity standards, and any applicable restrictions. Color additives that do not have a regulatory listing are not permitted for use in FDA-regulated products.

Under FDA regulations, the term externally applied cosmetics does not include the lips or body surfaces lined with mucous membranes. As a result, color additives approved only for external cosmetic use cannot automatically be used in products such as lipsticks unless the relevant regulation explicitly authorizes that application (21 CFR §70.3(v)). Federal regulations also prohibit the use of color additives in injections unless the additive is specifically listed as approved for that purpose. This restriction includes procedures such as tattooing and permanent makeup, which involve injecting pigment into the skin. Approval of a color additive for other uses does not authorize its use by injection, and currently no color additives are listed in federal regulations as approved for injection (21 CFR §70.5(b)).

== Notes for usage ==
It is advisable to follow color removal with a clear color filler before attempting to color hair again because hair will be more porous and re-dyed hair may darken more intensely and quickly. Additionally, hair dye stripping products often have a strong, lingering odor reminiscent of rotting eggs due to their sulfuric nature.

== Caution ==
Hair dye strippers contain chemical irritants. Avoid direct skin contact and use in well-ventilated areas.
