= Potassium sulfite =

Names
- IUPAC name Potassium sulfite
- Other names: E225

Identifiers
CAS Number	10117-38-1
3D model (JSmol)	Interactive image
ChemSpider	23332
ECHA InfoCard	100.030.279
PubChem CID	24958
UNII	015KZC652E
CompTox Dashboard (EPA)	DTXSID80889532
- InChI: InChI=1S/2K.H2O3S/c;;1-4(2)3/h;;(H2,1,2,3)/q2*+1;/p-2 Key: BHZRJJOHZFYXTO-UHFFFAOYSA-L; InChI=1/2K.H2O3S/c;;1-4(2)3/h;;(H2,1,2,3)/q2*+1;/p-2 Key: BHZRJJOHZFYXTO-NUQVWONBAU
- SMILES: [O-]S(=O)[O-].[K+].[K+]

Properties
Chemical formula	K_{2}SO_{3}
Molar mass	158.26 g/mol
Appearance	White solid
Density	2.49 g/cm^{3}
Solubility in water	Soluble
Acidity (pK_{a})	8
Magnetic susceptibility (χ)	−64.0·10^{−6} cm^{3}/mol

Hazards
Flash point	Non-flammable

Related compounds
Other anions	Potassium sulfate Potassium selenite
Other cations	Sodium sulfite
- Except where otherwise noted, data are given for materials in their standard state (at 25 °C [77 °F], 100 kPa). verify (what is ?) Infobox references

Potassium sulfite is the inorganic compound with the formula K_{2}SO_{3}. It is the salt of potassium cation and sulfite anion. It is a white solid that is highly soluble in water. Potassium sulfite is used for preserving food and beverages.

== History ==
Potassium sulfite was first obtained by Georg Ernst Stahl in the early 18th century, and was therefore known afterwards as Stahl's sulphureous salt. It became the first discovered sulfite and was first properly studied along with other sulfites by French chemists in the 1790s, and it was called sulphite of potash in the early 19th century. Gilles-François Boulduc also discovered the salt in water of Passy in the 1720s.

== Production and reactions ==
Potassium sulfite is produced by the thermal decomposition of potassium metabisulfite at 190 °C:

K_{2}S_{2}O_{5} → K_{2}SO_{3} + SO_{2}

== Structure ==
The structure of solid K_{2}SO_{3}, as assessed by X-ray crystallography. The S-O distances are 1.515 Å, and the O-S-O angles are 105.2°
