= Aam papad =

Fruit leather made out of mango pulp

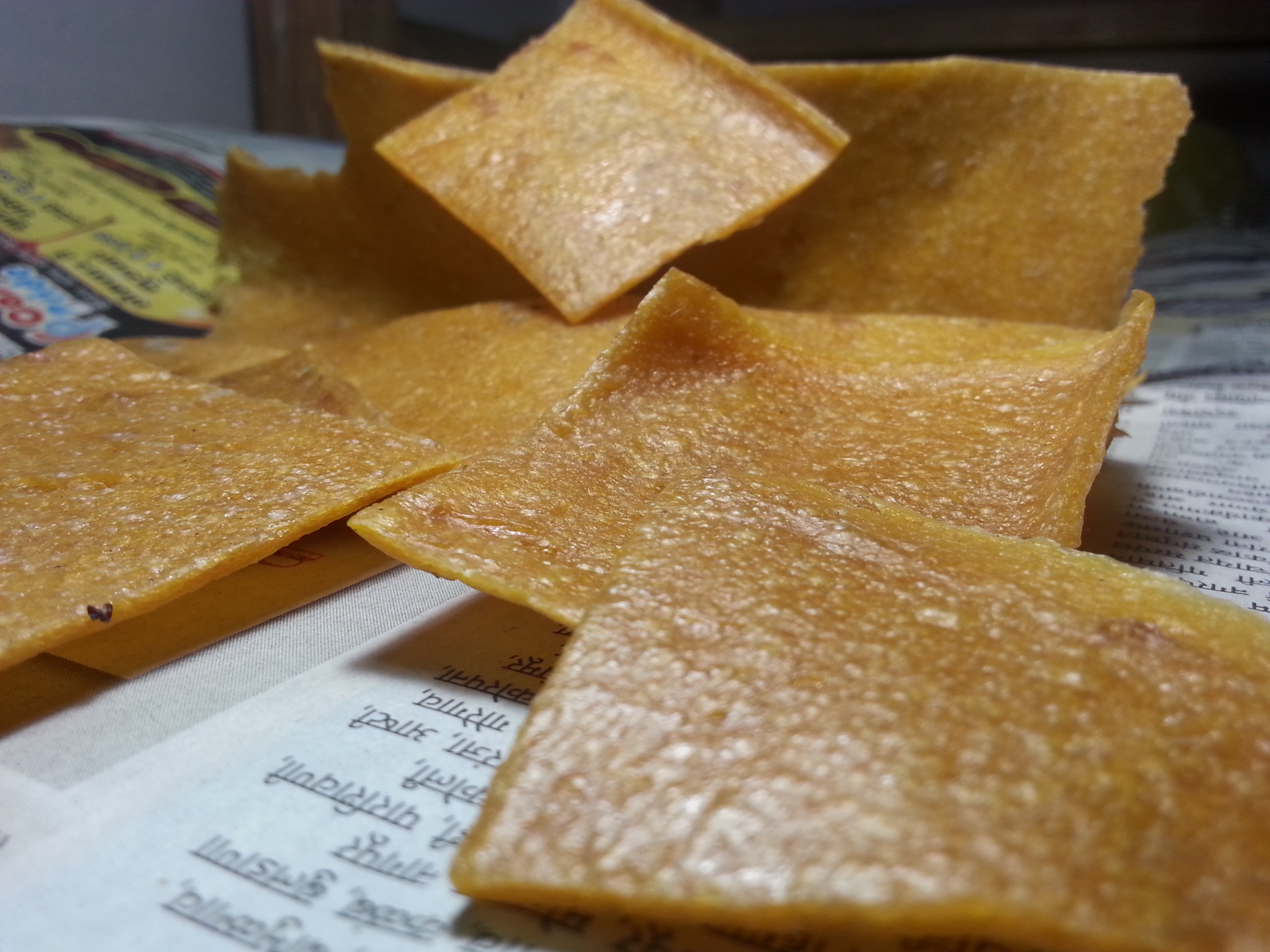
- Amba vadi, as it is known in Maharashtra
- Alternative names: Mamidi tandra, amawat, aamsotto, mambla, maanga thera
- Place of origin: South Asia
- Region or state: Bangladesh, India, Sri Lanka
- Main ingredients: Mango pulp, sugar

Aam papad is a fruit leather made out of mango pulp mixed with concentrated sugar solution and sun dried. It is also known as aamba sadhaa (Odia), aamta (Assamese), amawat (Bhojpuri), maanga thera (Malayalam), mamidi tandra (Telugu), aamsotto (Bengali) and amba vadi (Marathi).

Traditional aam papad is sweet, although it is available in different varieties. It can be preserved for months making it popular in the off season of mangoes.

== Preparation ==
Mango pulp is mixed with potassium metabisulfite and spread on trays to dry in the sun. After the first layer dries, another layer is spread over it and allowed to dry. The process is repeated until the desired thickness is reached. The thickness varies depending upon the quality of mango pulp used. When this thickness is reached the aam papad is cut into pieces and wrapped in oiled paper or into different packages.

Manufacturing mamiditandra (aam dapad) in Andhra Pradesh
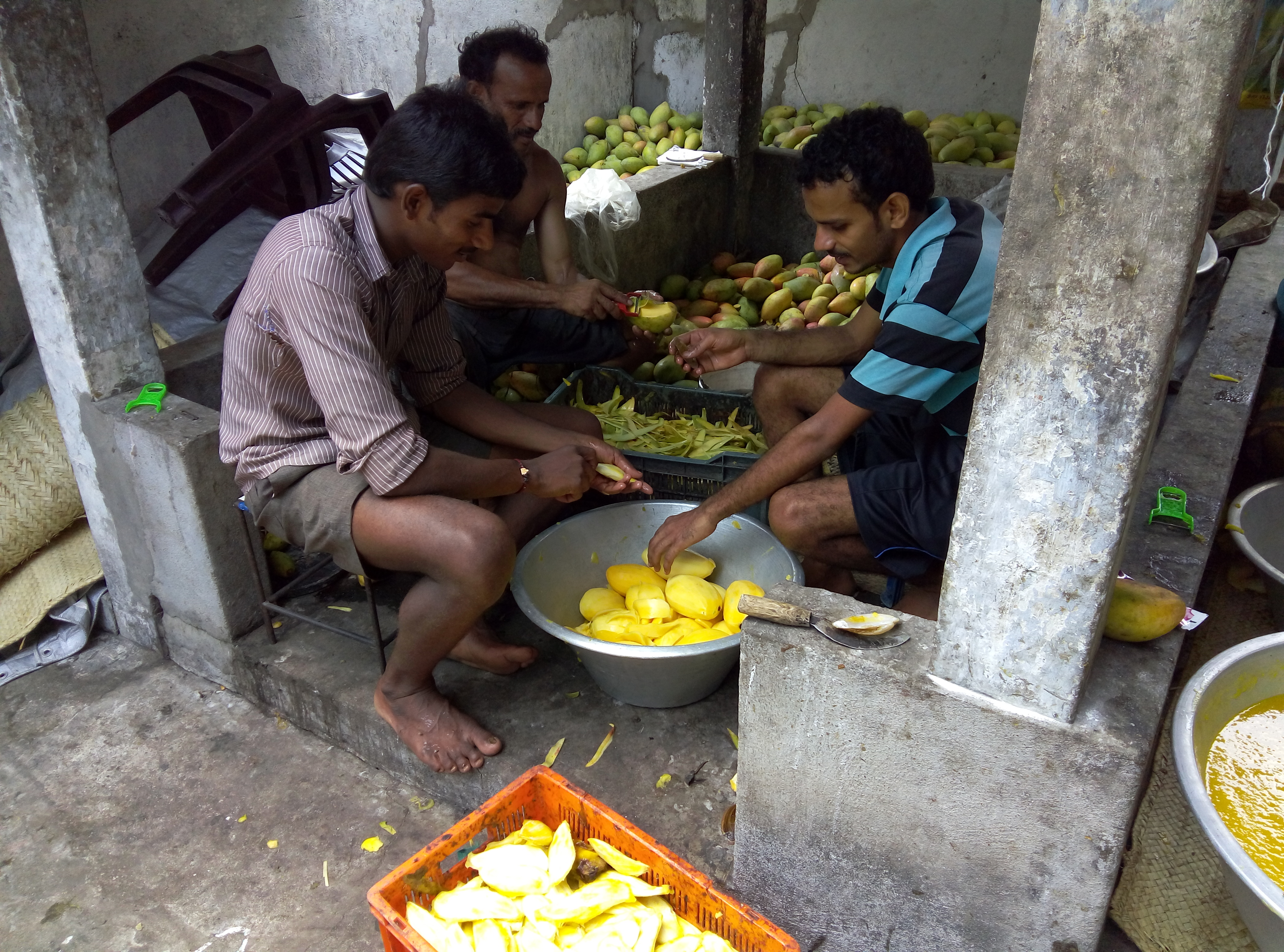

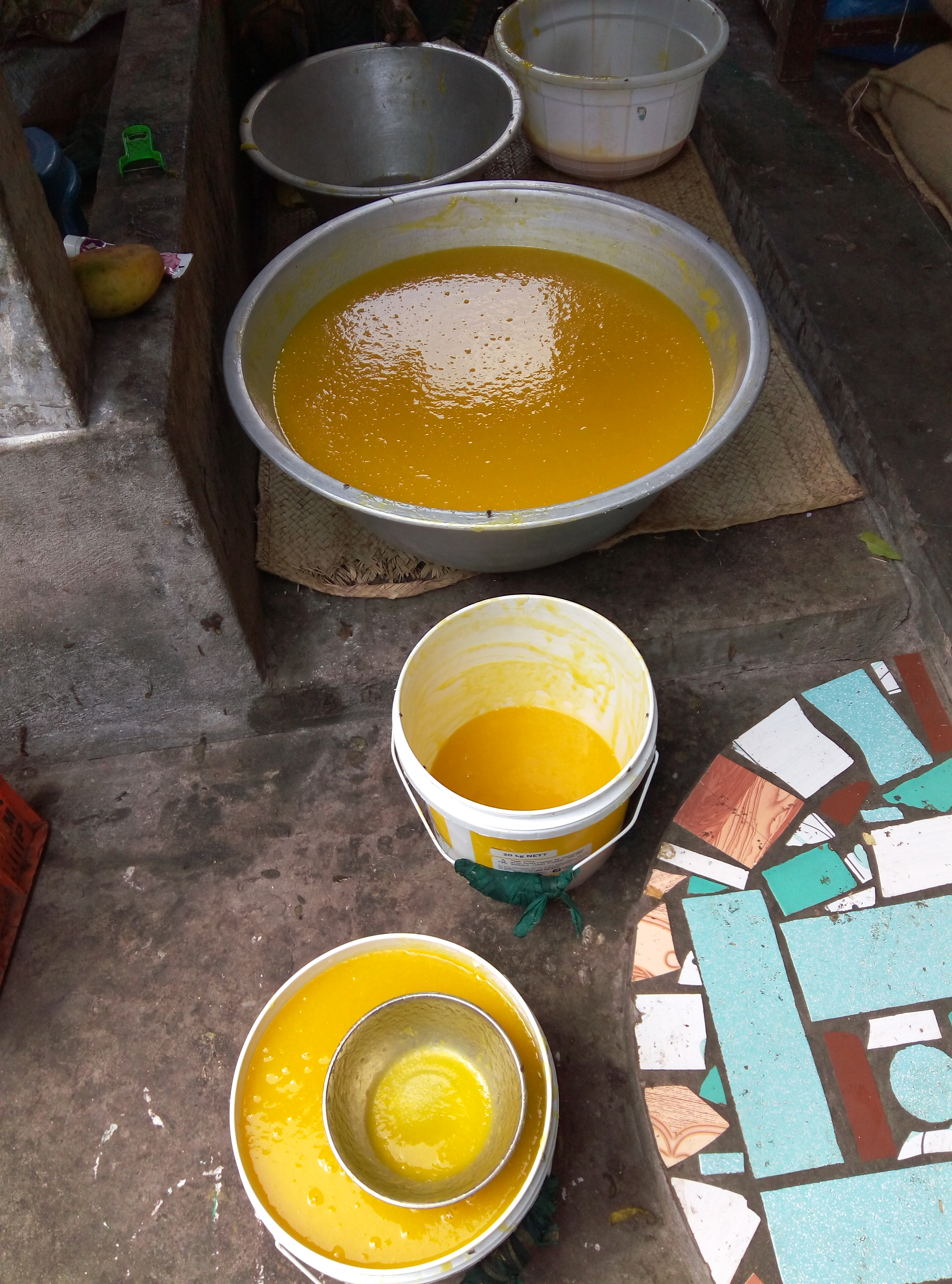

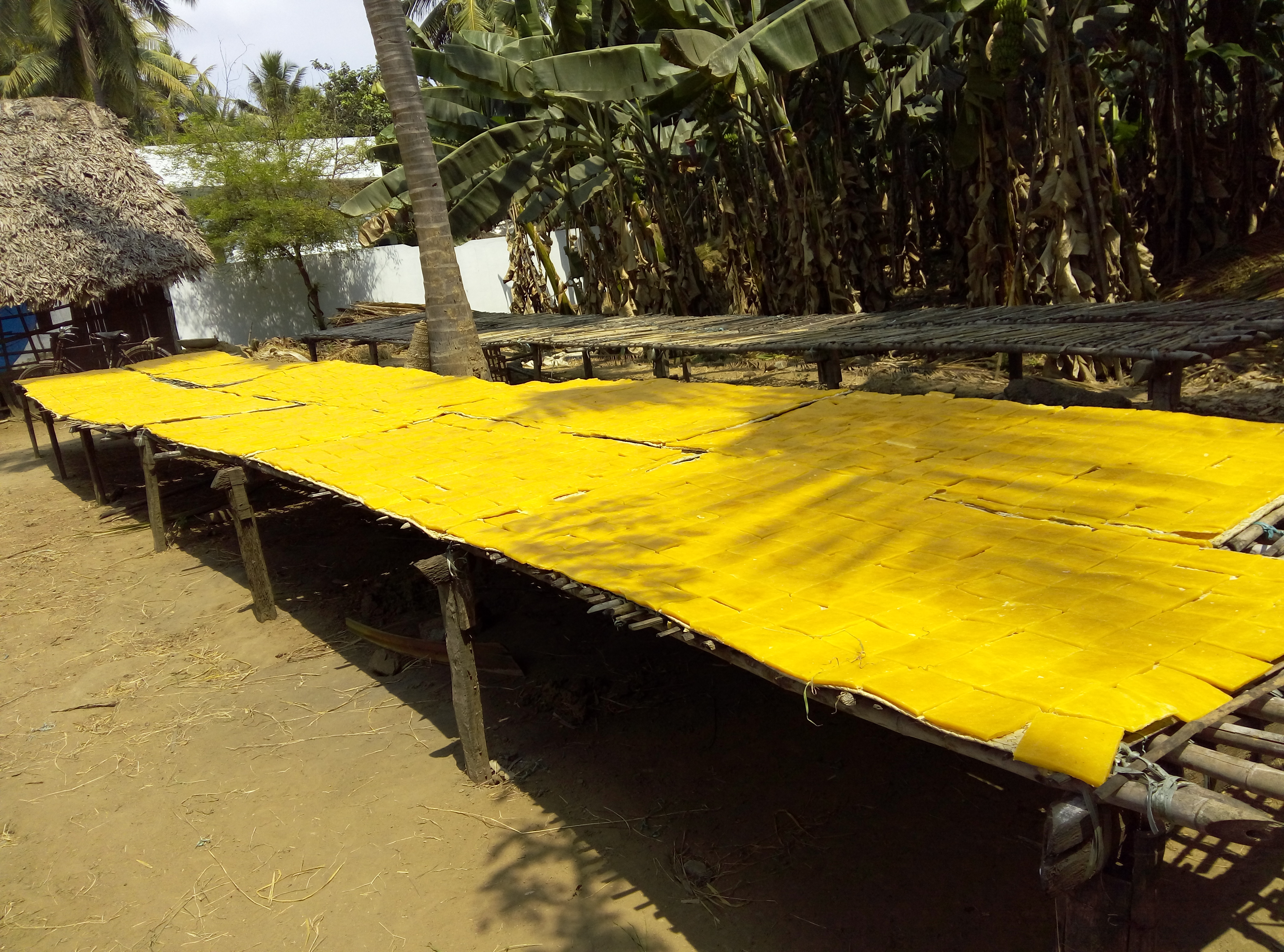

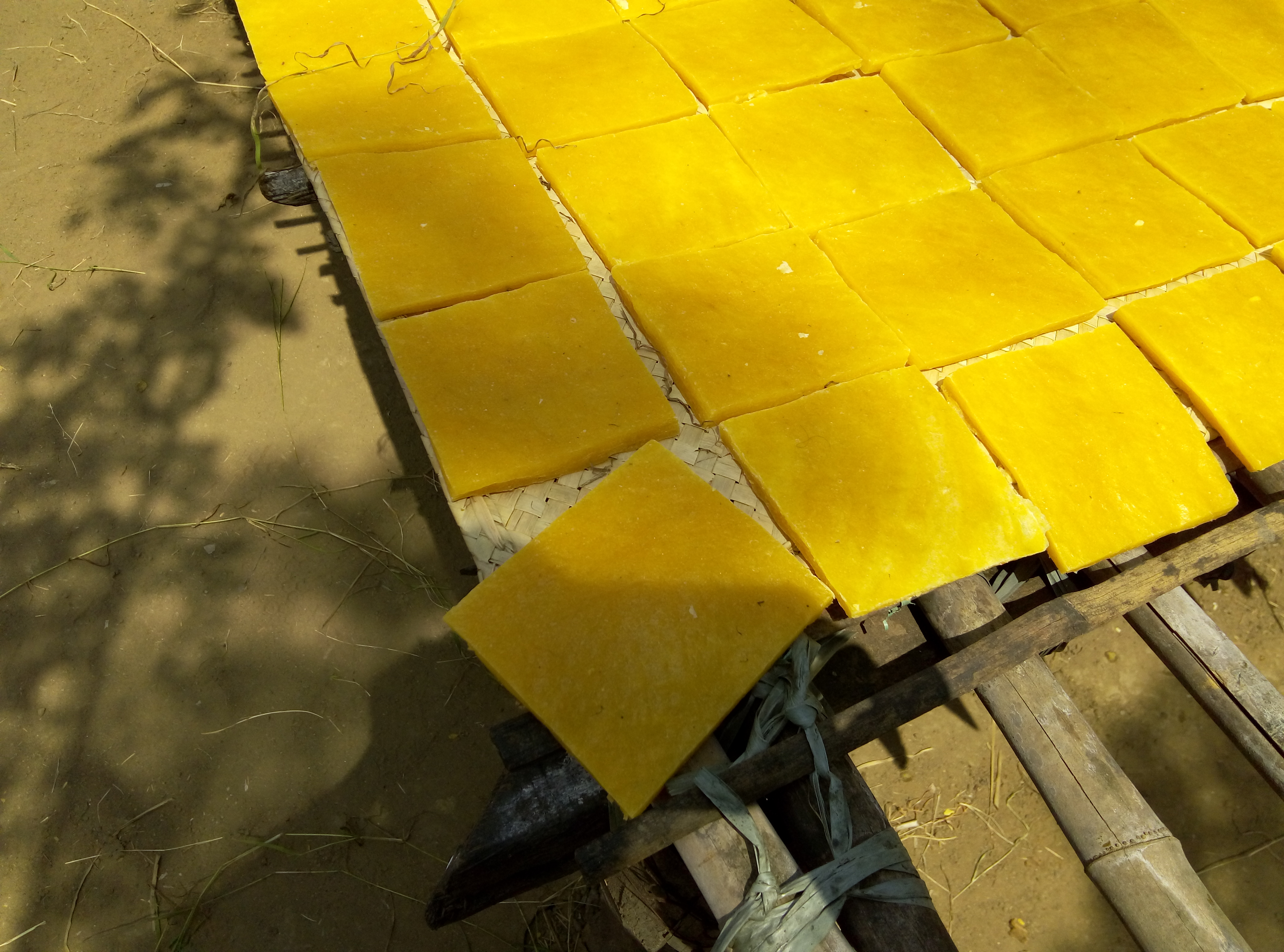

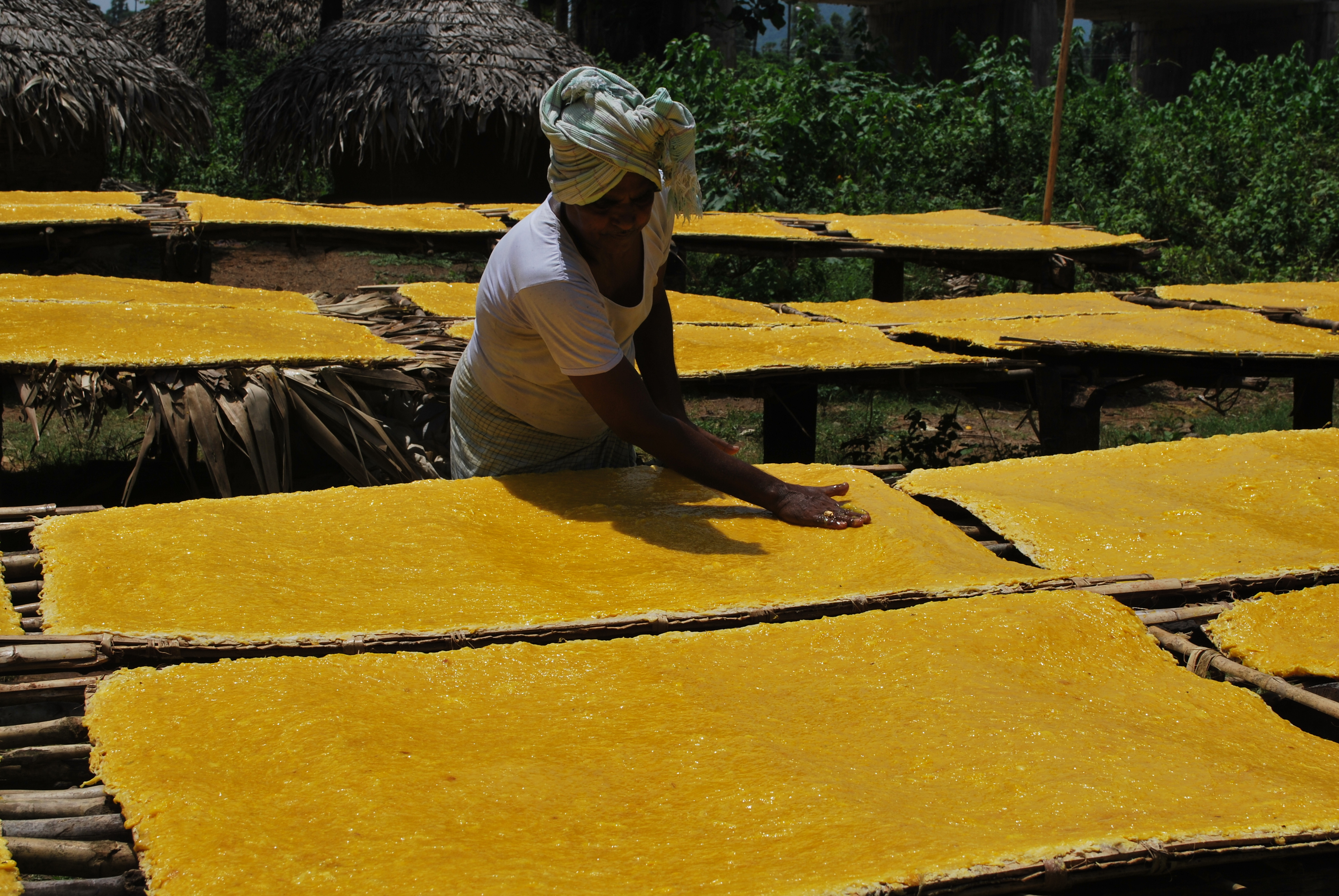
