= Calcium bisulfite =

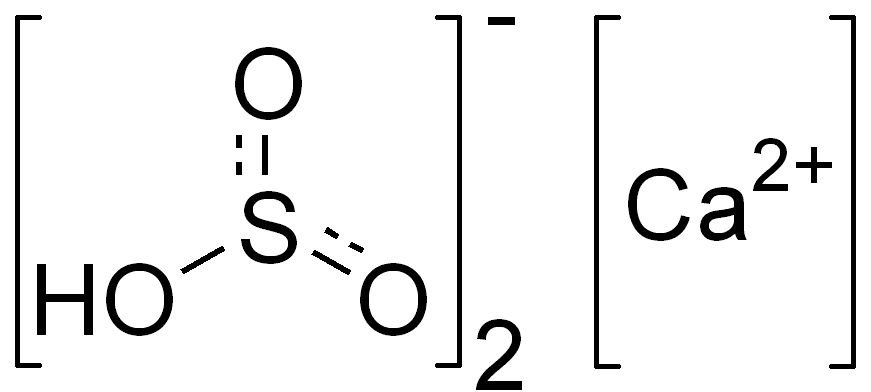

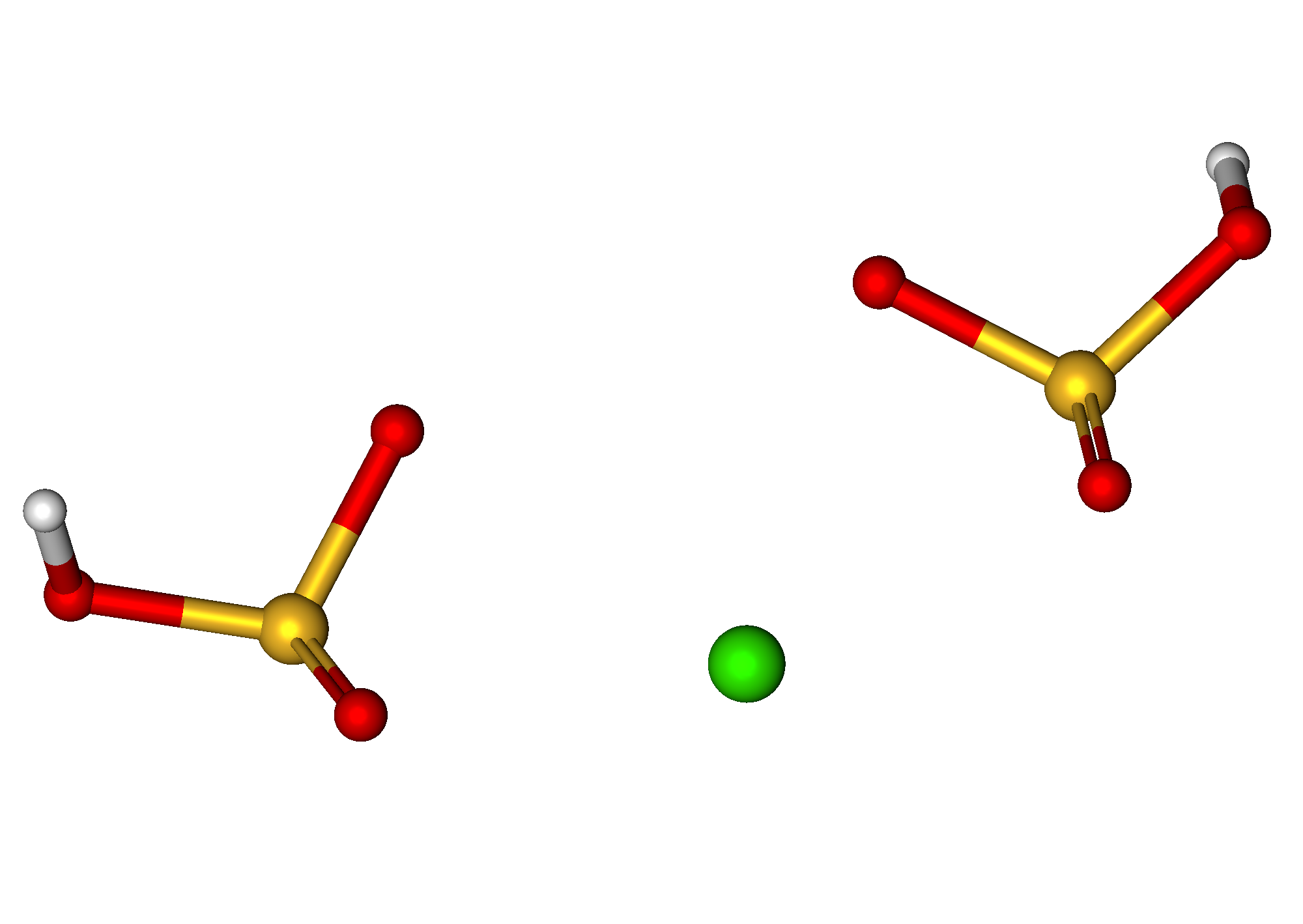

Names
- IUPAC name Calcium hydrogen sulfite
- Other names: Calcium bisulphite; E227

Identifiers
CAS Number	13780-03-5
3D model (JSmol)	Interactive image
ChemSpider	24475
ECHA InfoCard	100.034.007
E number	E227 (preservatives)
PubChem CID	26268
RTECS number	EV9294500
UNII	SNM7K02JP2
CompTox Dashboard (EPA)	DTXSID50889620
- InChI: InChI=1S/Ca.2H2O3S/c;2*1-4(2)3/h;2*(H2,1,2,3)/q+2;;/p-2 Key: LVGQIQHJMRUCRM-UHFFFAOYSA-L; InChI=1/Ca.2H2O3S/c;2*1-4(2)3/h;2*(H2,1,2,3)/q+2;;/p-2 Key: LVGQIQHJMRUCRM-NUQVWONBAX
- SMILES: OS(=O)[O-].OS(=O)[O-].[Ca+2]

Properties
Chemical formula	Ca(HSO_{3})_{2}
Molar mass	202.22 g/mol
Melting point	203 °C
- Except where otherwise noted, data are given for materials in their standard state (at 25 °C [77 °F], 100 kPa). verify (what is ?) Infobox references

Calcium bisulfite (calcium bisulphite or calcium hydrogen sulfite) is an inorganic compound which is the salt of a calcium cation and a bisulfite anion. It may be prepared by treating lime with an excess of sulfur dioxide and water. As a food additive it is used as a preservative under the E number E227. Calcium bisulfite is an acid salt and behaves like an acid in aqueous solution. It is used in the sulfite process for producing paper from wood chips.

== Synthesis ==
Calcium bisulfite can be prepared by treating lime (chemical formula Ca(OH)_{2}) with an excess of sulfur dioxide and water. Upon synthesis of calcium bisulfite solution, it will have a green to yellow opaque appearance as an aqueous solution.

== Chemical reactions ==
When calcium bisulfite reacts with the surrounding air, a crystalline precipitate will form composed of calcium sulfate dihydrate.

When calcium bisulfite is digested as a food additive, different reactions in metabolic pathways can result. One common pathway results in a reaction that will yield 6%-8% sulfur dioxide. This can go to sulfite when absorbed by the lungs, and the sulfite will be converted to sulfate in the liver by an enzyme called sulfite oxidase. Sulfite can be harmful for people susceptible to asthma, leading to asthma attacks. Sulfite can also cause urticaria and angioedema in otherwise healthy individuals.

A process known as wet limestone scrubbing is a means by which sulfur dioxide is removed from the waste emitted during the combustion of fossil fuels. A step in this process is the oxidation of calcium bisulfite to produce sulfate. When this reaction occurs in an aqueous solution, gypsum results. The rate of this reaction can be increased in the presence of magnesium(II) sulfate as a catalyst.

Other catalysts for the oxidation of calcium bisulfite include manganese, iron, cobalt, nickel, lead, and zinc.

== Application ==
=== Economical ===
Calcium bisulfite is one of the chemicals used in an overall mild bisulfite treatment meant to increase the sugar yield efficiency in processing timber excess to biofuel and jet fuel. The use of the Mild Bisulfite methodology both increases the yield and also saves cost in shipping wood to ethanol plants for processing.

Calcium bisulfite is often used as a food preservative. One such case is to brine cherries. However, research is showing that some microorganisms can cause cherries to rot since they produce the enzyme polygalacturonase that can work even in the presence of calcium bisulfite. Three species of fungi that are especially capable of rotting brined cherries are Aspergillus niger, Cytospora leucostoma, and Penicillium expansum.

=== Medicinal ===
A calcium bisulfite liquor solution is used in the process of converting dihydroquercetin in tree bark pulp and then converting dihydroquercetin to a usable form: quercetin. Calcium bisulfite is not the optimum bisulfite compound for this reaction since the calcium ions can be removed from the calcium bisulfite solution during the reaction, thereby inhibiting the mechanism. However, calcium bisulfites, like other bisuflites such as ammonium bisulfite, have a catalytic capacity in this reaction since they are not used up and can be reused.

== See also ==
- Pulp (paper)
- Potassium bisulfite
- Sodium bisulfite
