= Bisulfite =

Chemical compound or ion

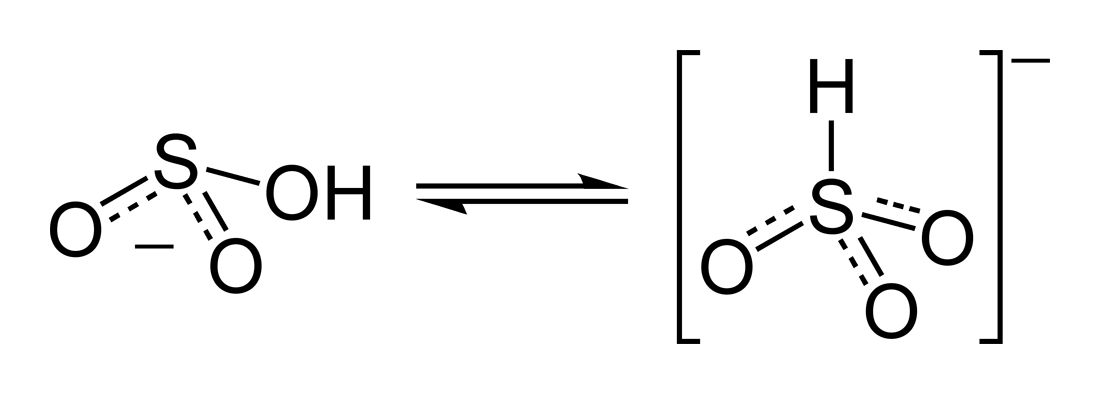
Equilibrium reaction relating the two tautomers of bisulfite.

The bisulfite ion (IUPAC-recommended nomenclature: hydrogensulfite) is the ion HSO_{3}^{−}. Salts containing the HSO_{3}^{−} ion are also known as "sulfite lyes". Sodium bisulfite is used interchangeably with sodium metabisulfite (Na_{2}S_{2}O_{5}). Sodium metabisulfite dissolves in water to give a solution of NaHSO_{3}.

Na_{2}S_{2}O_{5} + H_{2}O → 2 NaHSO_{3}

== Structure ==
The bisulfite anion exists in solution as a mixture of two tautomers. One tautomer has the proton attached to one of the three oxygen atoms. In the second tautomer the proton resides on sulfur. The S-protonated tautomer has C_{3v} symmetry. The O-protonated tautomer has only C_{s} symmetry.

== Reactions ==
=== Tautomerization ===
There exist two tautomers of bisulfite. They interconvert readily but can be characterized individually by various spectroscopic methods. They have been observed by ^{17}O NMR spectroscopy:

HSO_{3}^{−} $\ce{<=>>}$ SO_{2}(OH)^{−} K = 4.9

=== Acid-base reactions ===
Solutions of bisulfite are typically prepared by treatment of sulfur dioxide with aqueous base:

SO_{2} + OH^{−} → HSO_{3}^{−}

HSO_{3}^{−} is the conjugate base of sulfurous acid, (H_{2}SO_{3}).

HSO_{3}^{−} is a weakly acidic species with a pK_{a} of 6.97. Its conjugate base is sulfite, SO_{3}^{2−}:

HSO_{3}^{−} ⇌ SO_{3}^{2−} + H^{+}

=== Dehydration/hydration equilibria ===
Attempted isolation of the common salts of bisulfite results in dehydration of the anion with formation of metabisulfite (S_{2}O_{5}^{2−}), also known as disulfite:

2 HSO_{3}^{−} ⇌ S_{2}O_{5}^{2−} + H_{2}O

Because of this equilibrium, anhydrous sodium and potassium salts of bisulfite cannot be obtained. However, there are some reports of anhydrous bisulfites with large counter ions.

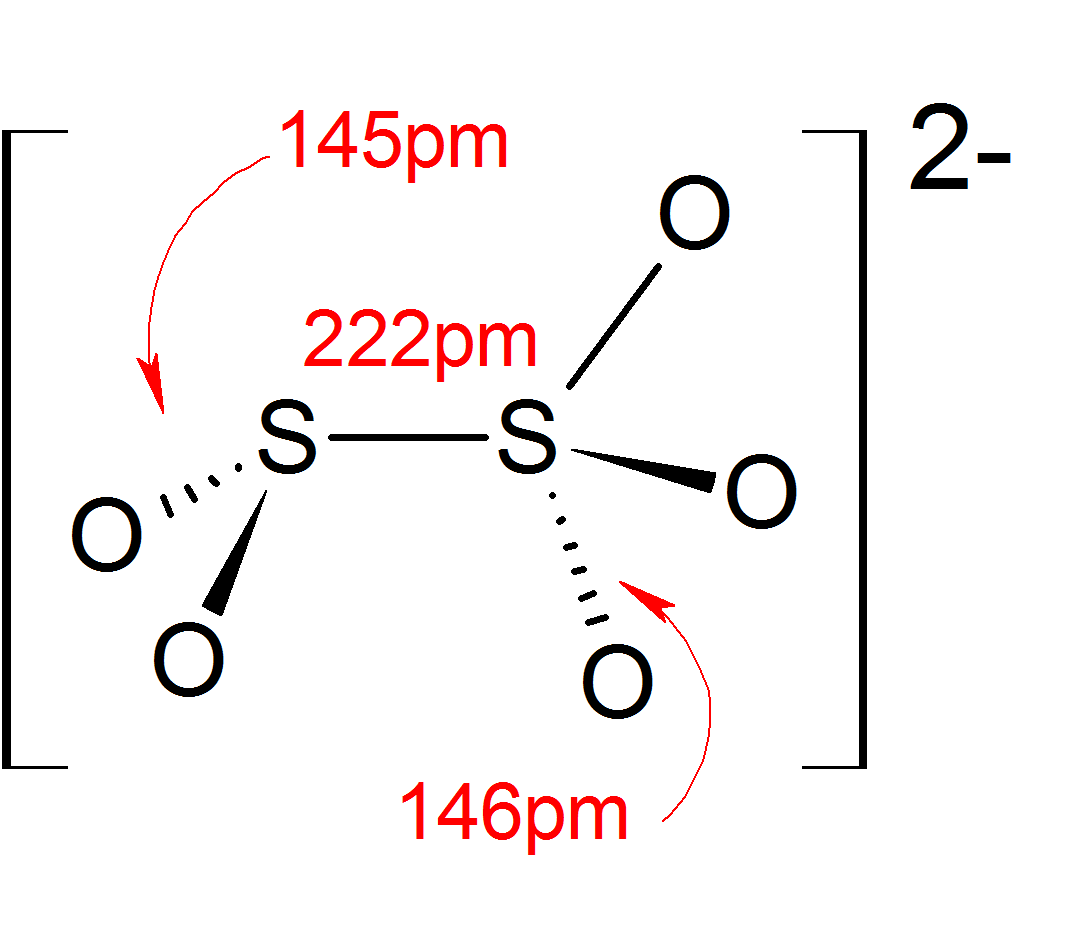
Structure of disulfite (aka metabisulfite) ion.

=== Redox reactions ===
Bisulfite is a good reducing agent, especially for oxygen scrubbing:

2 HSO_{3}^{−} + O_{2} → 2 SO_{4}^{2−} + 2 H^{+}

Its reducing properties are exploited to precipitate gold from auric acid (gold dissolved in aqua regia) and reduce chromium(VI) to chromium(III). In water chlorination, sodium bisulfite is used to reduce the residual 'chlorine' which can have a negative impact on aquatic life.

=== Organic synthesis ===

In organic chemistry, sodium bisulfite is used to form adducts with aldehyde and with certain cyclic ketones. These adducts are α-hydroxysulfonic acids. This reaction is useful for the separation and purification of aldehydes. The bisulfite adducts are charged and so are more soluble in polar solvents. The reaction can be reversed in base or strong acid. Examples of such procedures are described for benzaldehyde, 2-tetralone, citral, the ethyl ester of pyruvic acid and glyoxal. In the ring-expansion reaction of cyclohexanone with diazald, the bisulfite reaction is reported to allow differentiation between the primary reaction product cycloheptanone and the main contaminant cyclooctanone.

Another use of bisulfite in organic chemistry is as a mild reducing agent, for example to remove traces or excess amounts of chlorine, bromine, iodine, hypochlorite salts, osmate esters, chromium trioxide and potassium permanganate. Sodium bisulfite is a decoloration agent in purification procedures because it reduces strongly coloured oxidizing agents, conjugated alkenes and carbonyl compounds.

Bisulfite is also the key ingredient in the Bucherer reaction. In this reaction an aromatic hydroxyl group is converted to the corresponding amine group. This is a reversible reaction. The first step in this reaction is an addition reaction of sodium bisulfite to an aromatic double bond. The Bucherer carbazole synthesis is a related organic reaction that uses sodium bisulfite as a reagent.

=== Bisulfite DNA sequencing ===
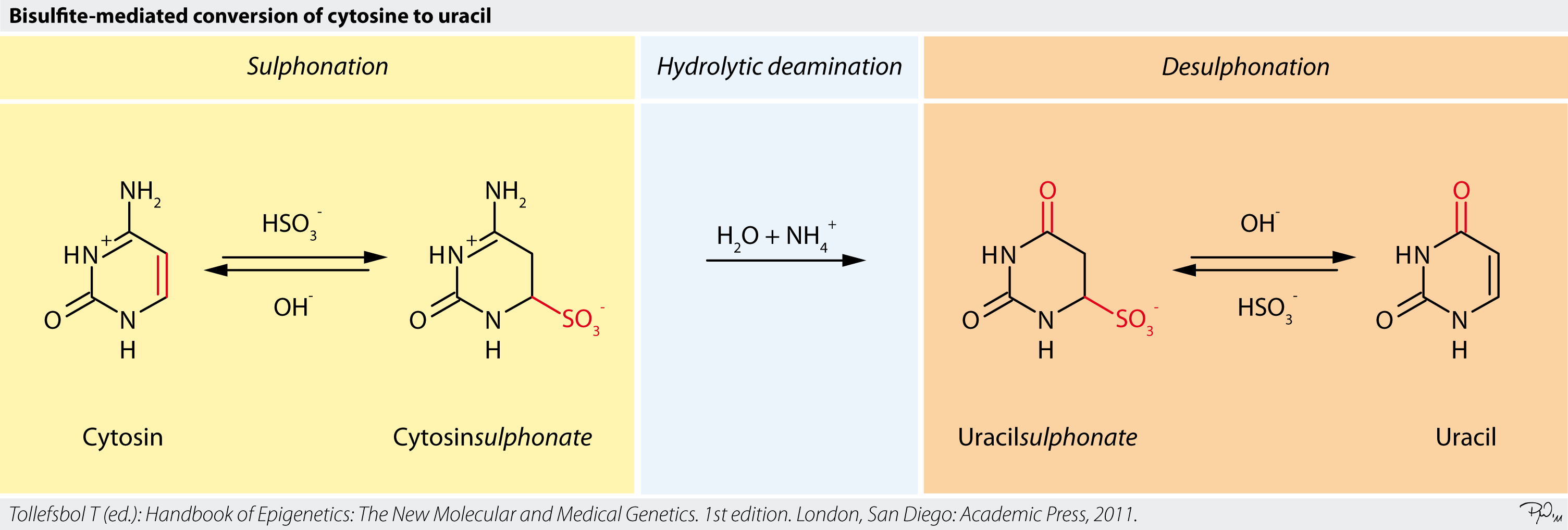
The chemical reaction that underlies the bisulfite-mediated conversion of cytosine to uracil.

Sodium bisulfite is used in the analysis of the methylation status of cytosines in DNA.

In this technique, sodium bisulfite deaminates cytosine into uracil, but does not affect 5-methylcytosine, a methylated form of cytosine with a methyl group attached to carbon 5.

When the bisulfite-treated DNA is amplified via polymerase chain reaction, the uracil is amplified as thymine and the methylated cytosines are amplified as cytosine. DNA sequencing techniques are then used to read the sequence of the bisulfite-treated DNA. Those cytosines that are read as cytosines after sequencing represent methylated cytosines, while those that are read as thymines represent unmethylated cytosines in the genomic DNA.
