= Potassium metabisulfite =

- Potassium metabisulfite

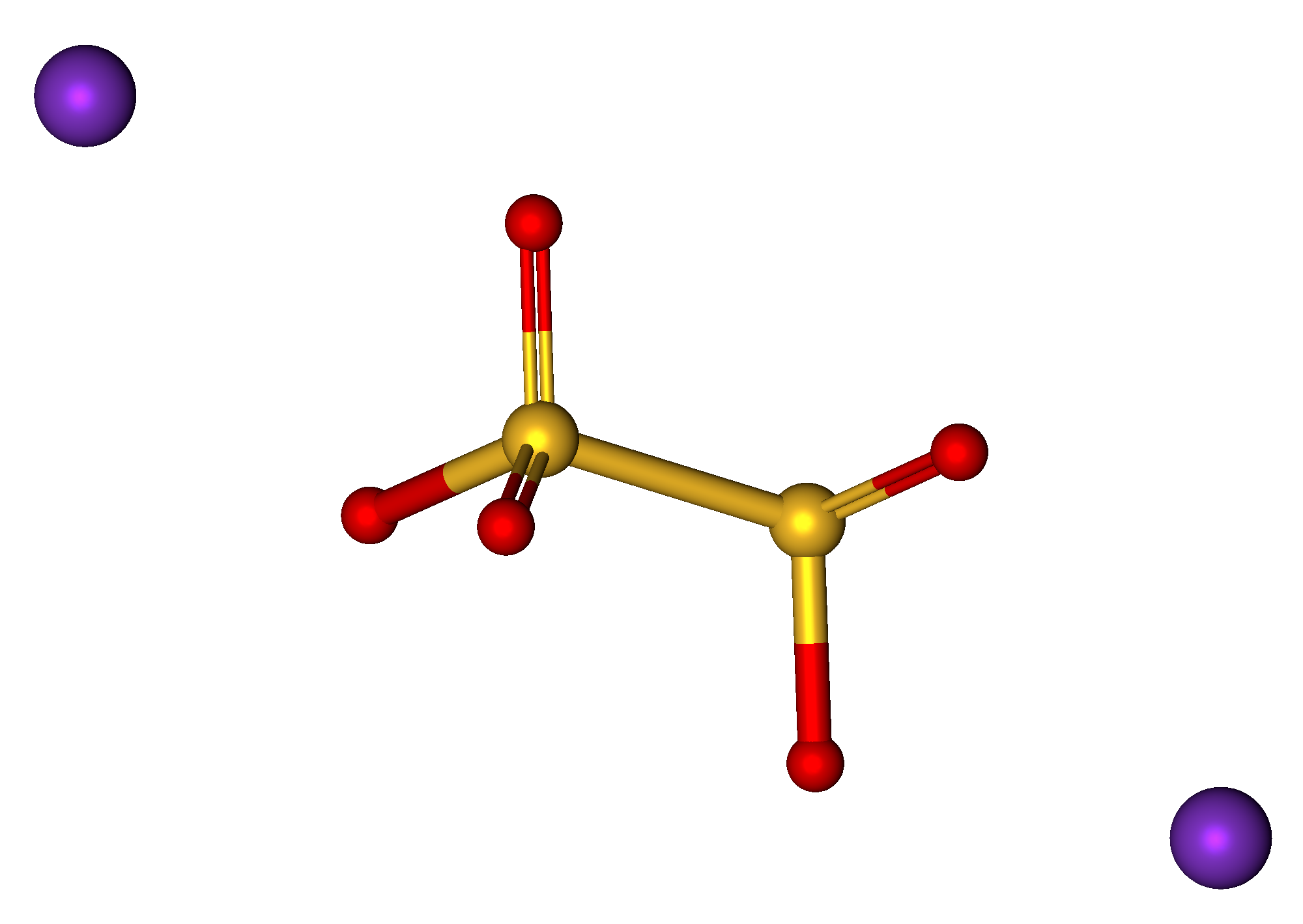

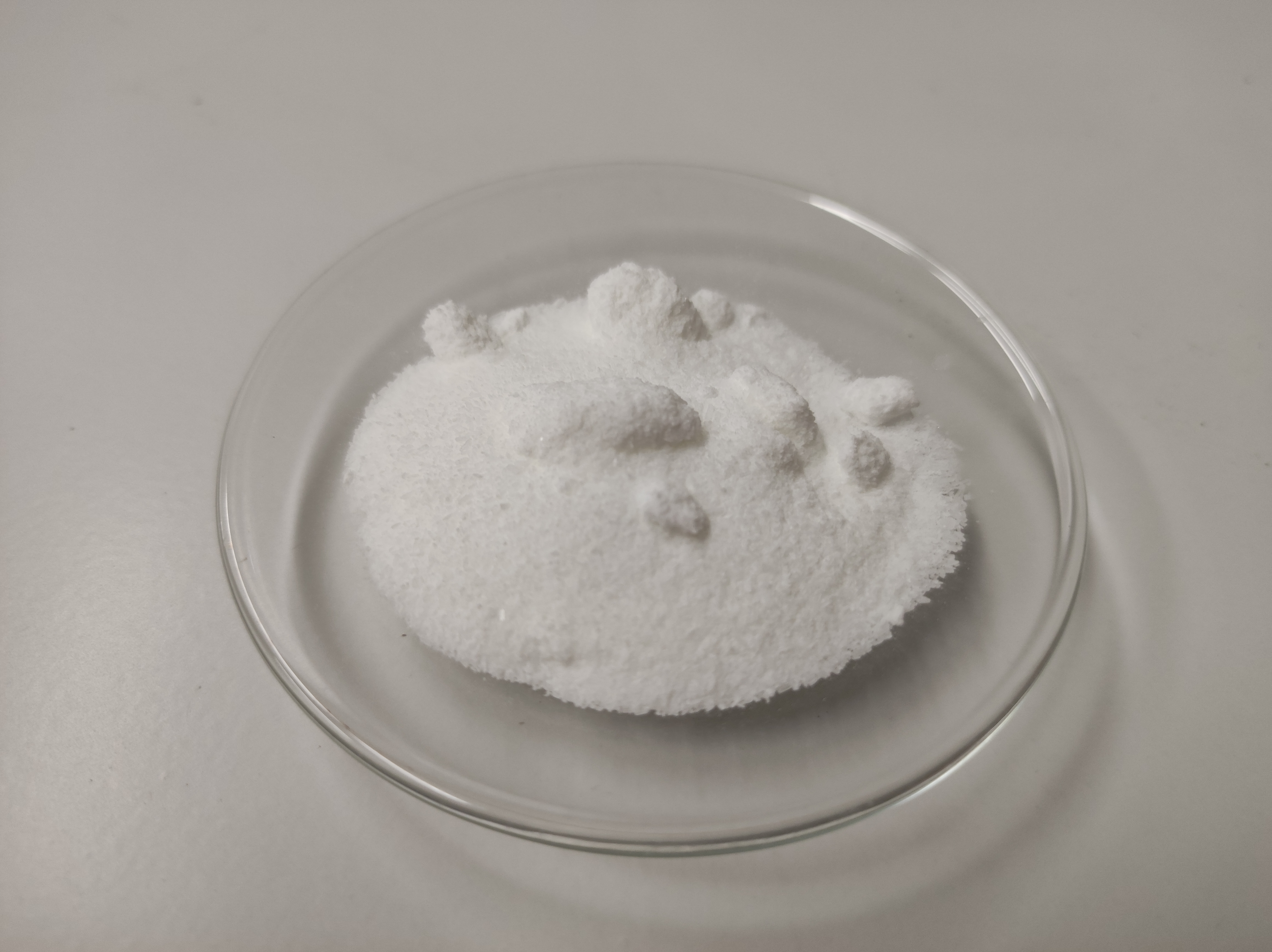

Names
- Other names: Potassium pyrosulfite; Dipotassium disulfite; Potassium metabisulphite; Dipotassium disulphite

Identifiers
CAS Number	16731-55-8
3D model (JSmol)	Interactive image
ChemSpider	26061
ECHA InfoCard	100.037.072
E number	E224 (preservatives)
PubChem CID	28019
RTECS number	TT4920000
UNII	65OE787Q7W
CompTox Dashboard (EPA)	DTXSID1021293
- InChI: InChI=1S/2K.H2O5S2/c;;1-6(2)7(3,4)5/h;;(H,1,2)(H,3,4,5)/q2*+1;/p-2 Key: RWPGFSMJFRPDDP-UHFFFAOYSA-L; InChI=1/2K.H2O5S2/c;;1-6(2)7(3,4)5/h;;(H,1,2)(H,3,4,5)/q2*+1;/p-2 Key: RWPGFSMJFRPDDP-NUQVWONBAF
- SMILES: [K+].[K+].[O-]S(=O)S([O-])(=O)=O

Properties
Chemical formula	K_{2}S_{2}O_{5}
Appearance	White crystalline powder
Odor	Pungent (sulfur dioxide)
Density	2.34 g/cm^{3} (solid)
Melting point	190 °C (374 °F; 463 K) decomposes
Solubility in water	450 g/L (20 °C)
Solubility	Insoluble in ethanol

Hazards
- Occupational safety and health (OHS/OSH)
Main hazards	Irritant, asthma risk
- GHS labelling
Pictograms	(GHS05: Corrosive) (GHS07: Exclamation mark)
Signal word	Danger
Hazard statements	H315, H318, H335
Precautionary statements	P261, P264, P271, P280, P302+P352, P304+P340, P305+P351+P338, P310, P312, P321, P332+P313, P362, P403+P233, P405, P501
NFPA 704 (fire diamond)	1 0 0
Safety data sheet (SDS)	ICSC 1175

Related compounds
Other anions	Potassium bisulfite Potassium sulfite
Other cations	Sodium metabisulfite
- Except where otherwise noted, data are given for materials in their standard state (at 25 °C [77 °F], 100 kPa). verify (what is ?) Infobox references

Potassium metabisulfite, K_{2}S_{2}O_{5}, also known as potassium pyrosulfite, is a white crystalline powder with a pungent odour. It is mainly used as an antioxidant or chemical sterilant. As a disulfite, it is chemically very similar to sodium metabisulfite, with which it is sometimes used interchangeably. Potassium metabisulfite has a monoclinic crystal structure.

== Preparation and reactions ==
Potassium metabisulfite can be prepared by treating a solution of potassium hydroxide with sulfur dioxide.

2 SO_{2} + 2 KOH → K_{2}S_{2}O_{5} + H_{2}O

It decomposes at 190 °C, yielding potassium sulfite and sulfur dioxide:

K_{2}S_{2}O_{5} → K_{2}SO_{3} + SO_{2}

== Uses ==
It is used as a food additive, also known as E224. It is restricted in use and may cause allergic reactions in some sensitive persons.

=== Wine ===
Potassium metabisulfite is a common wine or must additive, in which it forms sulfur dioxide (SO_{2}). Sulfur dioxide is a disinfectant. It also acts as a potent antioxidant, protecting both the color and delicate flavors of wine.

A high dose would be 3 grams of potassium metabisulfite per six-gallon bucket of must or around 132 milligrams per liter (yielding roughly 75 ppm of SO_{2}) prior to fermentation; then 6 grams per six-gallon bucket (150 ppm of SO_{2}) at bottling. Some countries regulate the SO_{2} content of wines.

Winemaking equipment is sanitized by spraying with a 1% SO_{2} (2 tsp potassium metabisulfite per L) solution.

=== Beer ===
Potassium metabisulfite is sometimes used in the brewing industry to inhibit the growth of wild bacteria and fungi. This step is called 'stabilizing'. It is also used to neutralize monochloramine from tap water. It is used both by homebrewers and commercial brewers alike. It is not used as much for brewing beer, because the wort is almost always boiled, which kills most microorganisms.

=== Other uses ===
- Potassium metabisulfite is sometimes added to lemon juice as a preservative.
- Potassium metabisulfite is used in the textile industry for dyeing and cotton printing.
- Potassium metabisulfite is sometimes used to precipitate gold from solution in aqua regia (as an alternative to sodium sulfite).
- It is a component of certain photographic developers and solutions used in photographic processing, keeping active developing species from contact with oxygen.
- It is used as a bleaching agent in the production of coconut cream.
- It is used in some pickles as a preservative.
- It is used in tint etching iron-based metal samples for microstructural analysis.
- It is used in aam papad as a preservative.

== Chemical structure ==
Potassium metabisulfite is not a bisulfite (HSO^{−}_{3}), salts of which are rarely isolated. Instead it is a pyrosulfite (S_{2}O^{2−}_{5}), which would result from dehydration of the hypothetical bisulfite:

2 HSO^{−}_{3} → O_{3}S−SO^{2−}_{2} + H_{2}O

The sodium, potassium, and ammonium bisulfites behave similarly. The S-S distance is about 222 pm and the S-O distances are near 147 pm. A double salt with an authentic bisulfite anion has been characterized in the form of K_{5}(HSO_{3})_{3}(S_{2}O_{5}).

== See also ==
- Campden tablet
