= Sodium bisulfite =

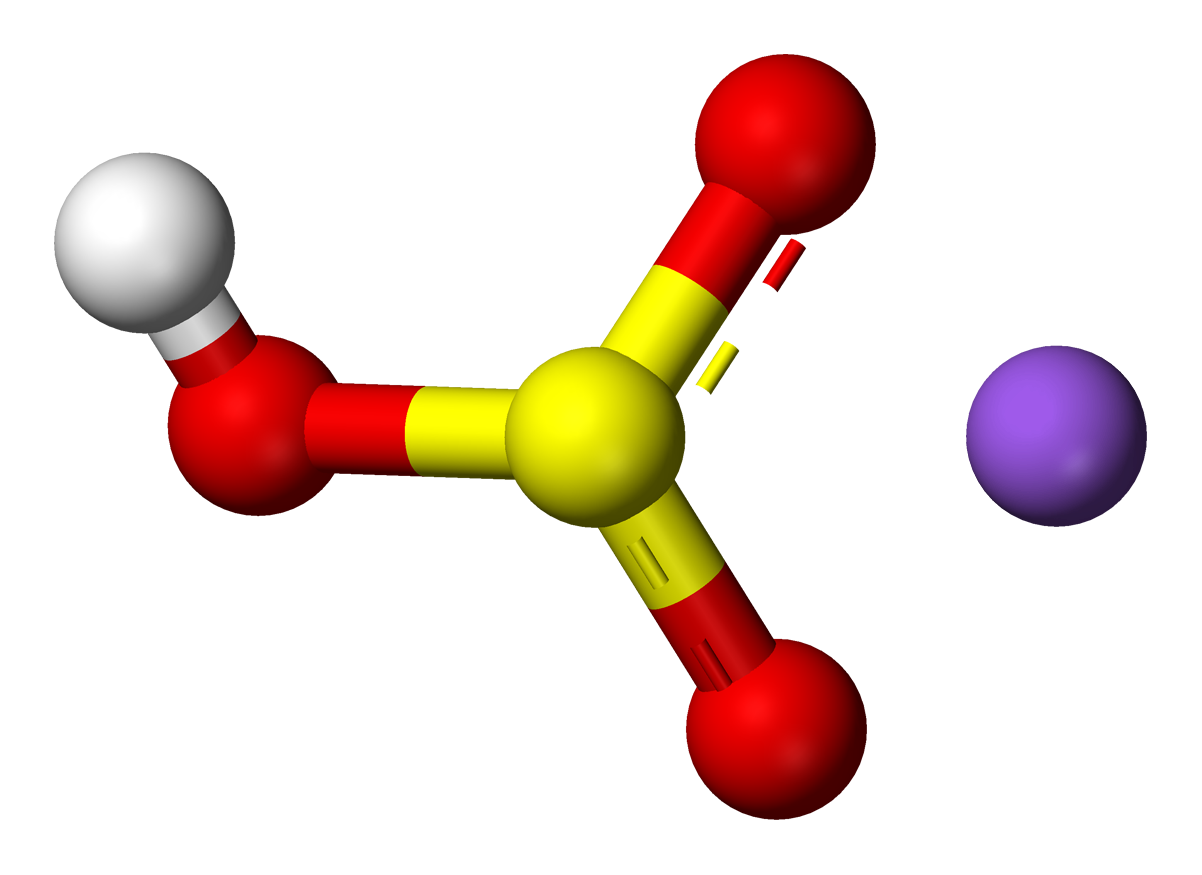
- Ball-and-stick model of a bisulfite anion (left) and a sodium cation (right)

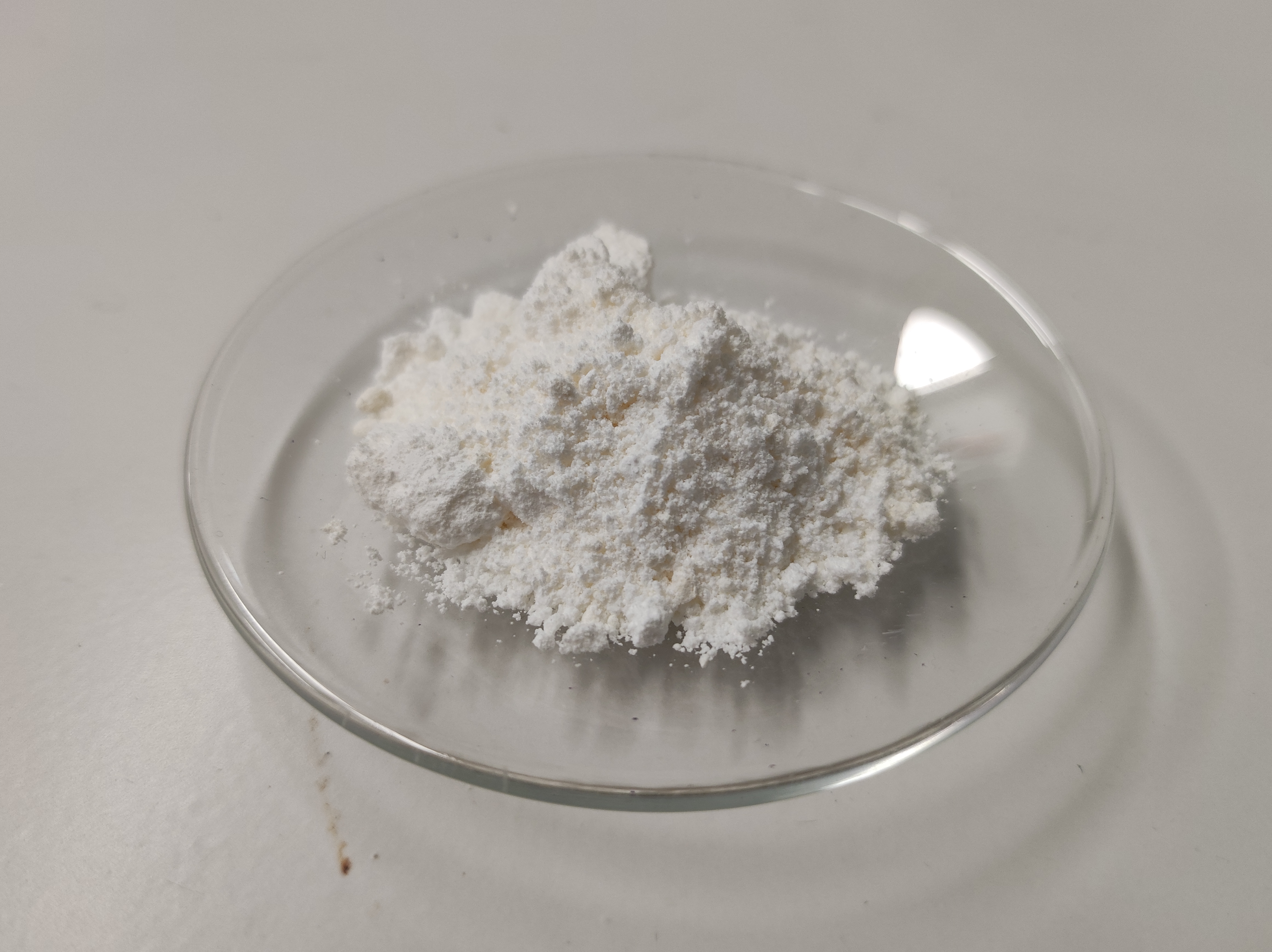

Names
- IUPAC name Sodium hydrogen sulfite
- Other names: E222; sodium bisulphite

Identifiers
CAS Number	7631-90-5
3D model (JSmol)	Interactive image
ChEBI	CHEBI:26709
ChEMBL	ChEMBL1689285
ChemSpider	571016
ECHA InfoCard	100.028.680
E number	E222 (preservatives)
PubChem CID	23665763
RTECS number	VZ2000000
UNII	TZX5469Z6I
CompTox Dashboard (EPA)	DTXSID8034902
- InChI: InChI=1S/Na.H2O3S/c;1-4(2)3/h;(H2,1,2,3)/q+1;/p-1 Key: DWAQJAXMDSEUJJ-UHFFFAOYSA-M; InChI=1/Na.H2O3S/c;1-4(2)3/h;(H2,1,2,3)/q+1;/p-1 Key: DWAQJAXMDSEUJJ-REWHXWOFAL
- SMILES: [Na+].[O-]S(=O)O

Properties
Chemical formula	NaHSO_{3}
Molar mass	104.061 g/mol
Appearance	White solid
Odor	Slight sulfurous odor
Density	1.48 g/cm^{3}
Melting point	150 °C (302 °F; 423 K)
Boiling point	315 °C (599 °F; 588 K)
Solubility in water	42 g/100 mL
Refractive index (n_{D})	1.526

Hazards
- GHS labelling
Pictograms	(GHS07: Exclamation mark)
Hazard statements	H302
Precautionary statements	P301+P312+P330
NFPA 704 (fire diamond)	2 0 1
Flash point	Non-flammable
- NIOSH (US health exposure limits)
PEL (Permissible)	none
REL (Recommended)	TWA 5 mg/m^{3}
IDLH (Immediate danger)	N.D.

Related compounds
Other anions	Sodium sulfite Sodium metabisulfite Sodium biselenite
Other cations	Potassium bisulfite
- Except where otherwise noted, data are given for materials in their standard state (at 25 °C [77 °F], 100 kPa). verify (what is ?) Infobox references

Sodium bisulfite (or sodium bisulphite, sodium hydrogen sulfite) is a chemical mixture with the approximate chemical formula NaHSO_{3}. Sodium bisulfite is not a real compound, but a mixture of salts that dissolve in water to give solutions composed of sodium and bisulfite ions. It appears in form of white or yellowish-white crystals with an odor of sulfur dioxide. Sodium bisulfite is used in a variety industries such as a food additive with E number E222 in the food industry. It is also used as a reducing agent for applications in the textile and cosmetics industries.

== Synthesis ==
Sodium bisulfite solutions can be prepared by treating a solution of suitable base, such as sodium hydroxide or sodium bicarbonate with sulfur dioxide.

SO_{2} + NaOH → NaHSO_{3}
SO_{2} + NaHCO_{3} → NaHSO_{3} + CO_{2}

Attempts to crystallize the product yield sodium metabisulfite (also called sodium disulfite), Na_{2}S_{2}O_{5}.

Upon dissolution of the metabisulfite in water, bisulfite is regenerated:

Na_{2}S_{2}O_{5} + H_{2}O → 2 Na^{+} + 2 HSO_{3}^{−}

Sodium bisulfite is formed during the Wellman-Lord process.

== Uses ==
=== Cosmetics ===
Sodium bisulfite functions as a hair-waving/straightening agent. As of 1998, sodium bisulfite was used in 58 cosmetic products including hair conditioners, moisturizers, and hair dyes.

=== Food industry ===
Sodium bisulfite is used to prevent discoloration, bleach food starches, and delay spoilage of the product. In the US, EPA, FDA, and American Conference of Governmental Industrial Hygienists established a working place threshold limit value for sulfur dioxide (which is formed from bisulfite) of 2ppm averaged over 8 hours, and a 3-hour level of 5ppm. Even with this threshold established, the FDA recognized sodium bisulfite as "generally recognized as safe" compound.

Sulfites in food can be assayed by the Monier-Williams type procedure, HPLC after extraction, and Flow Injection analysis.

=== Textile industry ===
Sodium bisulfite is used as an antichlor in the textile industry. Antichlors are very useful in the textile industry because bleaching of compounds using chlorine is a standard practice.

== Safety ==
The International Agency for Research on Cancer concluded that there was inadequate evidence that sodium bisulfite was carcinogenic. Under specific conditions such as acidity and concentration level, sodium bisulfite was able to cause negative alterations to the genome such as catalyzing transamination, and to induce sister-chromatid exchanges suggesting possible genotoxicity. In a study using Osbourne-Mendel strain rats, it was concluded that oral toxicity was not significant if the consumed concentration was less than 0.1% (615 ppm as SO_{2}). A study by Servalli, Lear, and Cottree in 1984 found that sodium bisulfite did not produce membrane fusion in hepatic and murine glial cells and human fibroblasts, so there is no oral toxicity. These clinical studies concluded that sodium bisulfite was safe to use in cosmetic formulations.

The concentrations of sodium bisulfite that could be dangerous are well beyond the concentrations discussed in the cosmetic and food industry, thereby indicating it is extremely unlikely to pose an environmental threat.

The World Health Organization Expert Committee on Food Additives concluded that 0-0.7 mg of sulfur dioxide equivalent/kg of body weight per day will cause no harm to an individual consuming this compound as a food additive. Sulfites exhibit no genotoxicity and carcinogenicity.

== See also ==
- Sodium metabisulfite
- Calcium bisulfite
- Potassium bisulfite
- Croscarmellose sodium
- Sulfurous acid
