= Sulfurous acid =

Chemical compound

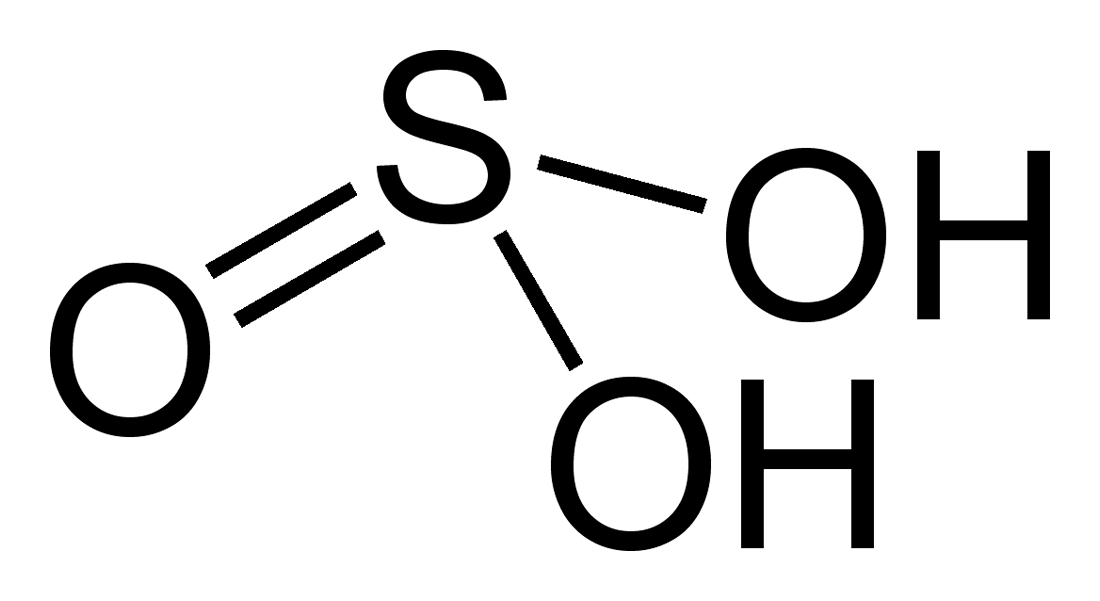
- Sulfuric(IV) acid

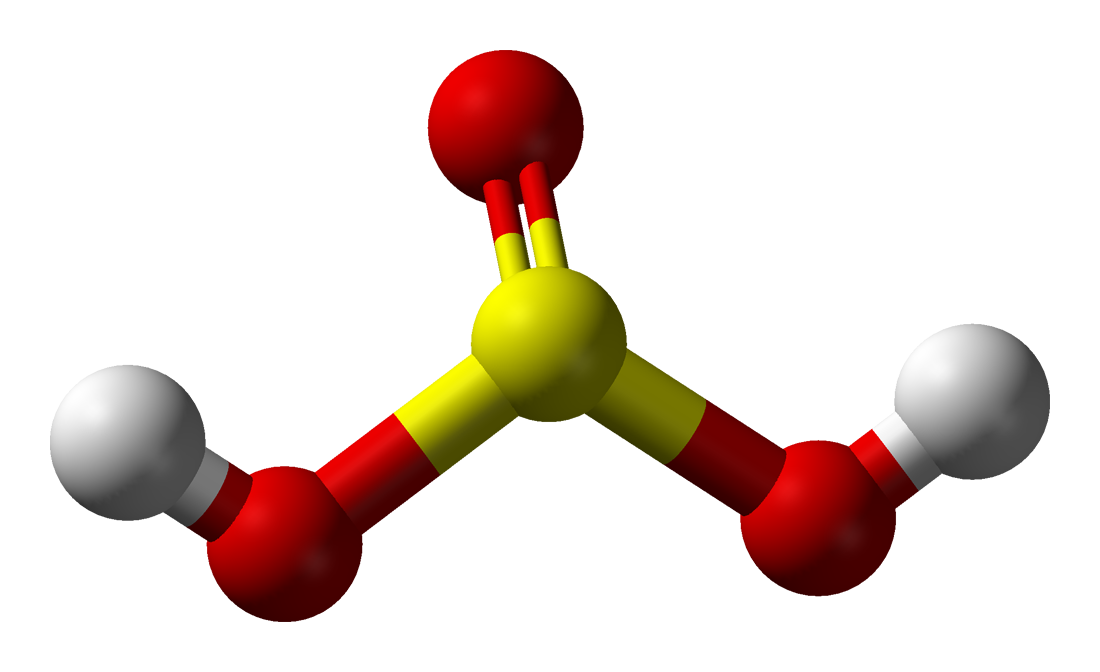
- Ball-and-stick model of sulfurous acid

Names
- IUPAC name Sulfurous acid
- Other names Thionic acid Sulfinic acid

Identifiers
CAS Number	7782-99-2
3D model (JSmol)	Interactive image; Tautomer: Interactive image
ChEBI	CHEBI:48854
ChEMBL	ChEMBL1161699
ChemSpider	1069
ECHA InfoCard	100.029.066
EC Number	231-973-1
Gmelin Reference	1458
KEGG	C00094
PubChem CID	1100
UNII	J1P7893F4J
CompTox Dashboard (EPA)	DTXSID7042435
- InChI: InChI=1S/H2O3S/c1-4(2)3/h(H2,1,2,3) Key: LSNNMFCWUKXFEE-UHFFFAOYSA-N; InChI=1/H2O3S/c1-4(2)3/h(H2,1,2,3) Key: LSNNMFCWUKXFEE-UHFFFAOYAJ
- SMILES: O[S](=O)O; Tautomer: O[S+](O)[O-]

Properties
Chemical formula	H_{2}SO_{3}
Molar mass	82.07 g/mol
Acidity (pK_{a})	1.857, 7.172
Conjugate base	Bisulfite

Hazards
- GHS labelling
Pictograms	(GHS05: Corrosive) (GHS07: Exclamation mark)
Signal word	Danger
Hazard statements	H314, H332
Precautionary statements	P260, P264, P271, P280, P301+P330+P331, P303+P361+P353, P304+P312, P304+P340, P305+P351+P338, P310, P312, P321, P363, P405, P501
Flash point	Non-flammable
Safety data sheet (SDS)	ICSC 0074

Related compounds
Related compounds	Sulfur dioxide Sulfuric acid Selenous acid
- Except where otherwise noted, data are given for materials in their standard state (at 25 °C [77 °F], 100 kPa). verify (what is ?) Infobox references

Sulfurous acid (United Kingdom spelling: sulphurous acid) is the chemical compound with the formula H_{2}SO_{3}.

Raman spectra of solutions of sulfur dioxide in water show only signals due to the SO_{2} molecule and the bisulfite ion, HSO_{3}^{−}. The intensities of the signals are consistent with the following equilibrium:

SO_{2} + H_{2}O ⇌ HSO_{3}^{−} + H^{+} K_{a} = 1.54×10^{−2}; pK_{a} = 1.81.

^{17}O NMR spectroscopy provided evidence that solutions of sulfurous acid and protonated sulfites contain a mixture of isomers, which is in equilibrium:

[H−OSO_{2}]^{−} ⇌ [H−SO_{3}]^{−}

Attempts to concentrate the solutions of sulfurous acid simply reverse the equilibrium, producing sulfur dioxide and water vapor. A clathrate with the formula 4SO_{2}·23H_{2}O has been crystallised. It decomposes above 7 °C.

== History and production ==
Sulfurous acid is commonly known not to exist in its free state, and owing to this, it is stated in textbooks that it cannot be isolated in the water-free form. However, the molecule has been detected in the gas phase in 1988 by the dissociative ionization of diethyl sulfite. The conjugate bases of this elusive acid are, however, common anions, bisulfite (or hydrogen sulfite) and sulfite. Sulfurous acid is an intermediate species in the formation of acid rain from sulfur dioxide.

== Uses ==
Aqueous solutions of sulfur dioxide, which sometimes are referred to as sulfurous acid, are used as reducing agents and as disinfectants, as are solutions of bisulfite and sulfite salts. They are oxidised to sulfuric acid or sulfate by accepting another oxygen atom.

The reaction of concentrated aqueous sulfurous acid with sulfur monochloride gives tetrathionic acid, which can be neutralized to give various tetrathionate salts:

2 H_{2}SO_{3} + S_{2}Cl_{2} → H_{2}S_{4}O_{6} + 2 HCl
H_{2}S_{4}O_{6} + 2 KOH → K_{2}S_{4}O_{6} + 2 KCl

== See also ==
- Bisulfite
- Carbonic acid
- Pulp (paper)
- Sulfite paper pulp process
- Sulfite
- Sulfuric acid
