= Sodium metabisulfite =

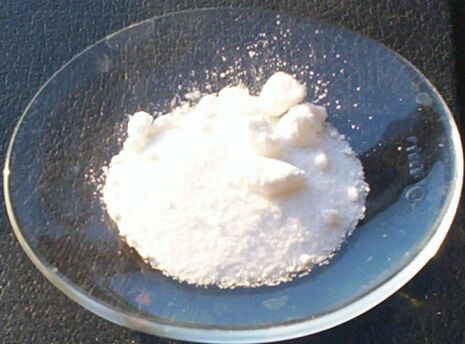
- Sodium metabisulfite

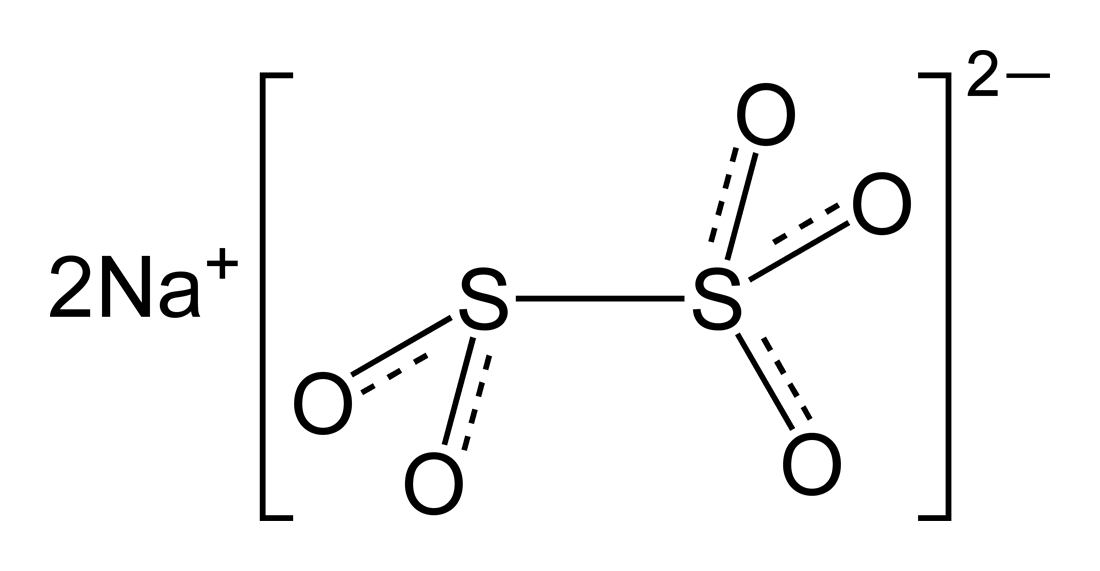
- Structure of sodium metabisulfite

Names
- Other names: Sodium pyrosulfite; Sodium disulfite

Identifiers
CAS Number	7681-57-4
3D model (JSmol)	Interactive image
ChEBI	CHEBI:114786
ChEMBL	ChEMBL2016976
ChemSpider	571015
ECHA InfoCard	100.028.794
EC Number	231-673-0
E number	E223 (preservatives)
KEGG	D02054
PubChem CID	656671
RTECS number	UX8225000
UNII	4VON5FNS3C
UN number	1759 (SODIUM METABISULFITE)
CompTox Dashboard (EPA)	DTXSID0029684
- InChI: Key: HRZFUMHJMZEROT-UHFFFAOYSA-L; InChI=1S/2Na.H2O5S2/c;;1-6(2)7(3,4)5/h;;(H,1,2)(H,3,4,5)/q2*+1;/p-2
- SMILES: [O-]S(=O)S(=O)(=O)[O-].[Na+].[Na+]

Properties
Chemical formula	Na_{2}S_{2}O_{5}
Molar mass	190.107 g/mol
Appearance	White to yellow powder
Odor	Faint SO_{2}
Density	1.48 g/cm^{3}
Melting point	170 °C (338 °F; 443 K) decomposition begins at 150 °C
Solubility in water	45.1 g/100 mL (0 °C); 65.3 g/100 mL (20 °C); 81.7 g/100 mL (100 °C)
Solubility	Very soluble in glycerol Slightly soluble in ethanol

Hazards
- GHS labelling
Pictograms	(GHS05: Corrosive) (GHS07: Exclamation mark)
Signal word	Danger
Hazard statements	H302, H318
Precautionary statements	P264, P270, P280, P301+P312, P305+P351+P338, P310, P330, P501
NFPA 704 (fire diamond)	2 0 1
- NIOSH (US health exposure limits)
PEL (Permissible)	None
REL (Recommended)	TWA 5 mg/m^{3}
IDLH (Immediate danger)	N.D.
Safety data sheet (SDS)	Mallinckrodt MSDS

Related compounds
Other anions	Sodium sulfite Sodium bisulfite
Other cations	Potassium metabisulfite
Related compounds	Sodium dithionite Sodium thiosulfate Sodium sulfate
- Except where otherwise noted, data are given for materials in their standard state (at 25 °C [77 °F], 100 kPa). verify (what is ?) Infobox references

Sodium metabisulfite or sodium pyrosulfite (IUPAC spelling; Br. E. sodium metabisulphite or sodium pyrosulphite) is an inorganic compound of chemical formula Na_{2}S_{2}O_{5}. The substance is sometimes referred to as disodium metabisulfite. It is used as a disinfectant, antioxidant, and preservative agent. When dissolved in water it forms sodium bisulfite.

== Preparation ==
Sodium metabisulfite can be prepared by treating a solution of sodium hydroxide with sulfur dioxide. When conducted in warm water, Na_{2}SO_{3} initially precipitates as a yellow solid. With more SO_{2}, the solid dissolves to give the disulfite, which crystallises upon cooling.

SO_{2} + 2 NaOH → Na_{2}SO_{3} + H_{2}O
SO_{2} + Na_{2}SO_{3} → Na_{2}S_{2}O_{5}

which yields a residue of colourless solid Na_{2}S_{2}O_{5}.

== Chemical structure ==
The anion metabisulfite consists of an SO_{2} group linked to an SO_{3} group, with the negative charge more localised on the SO_{3} end. The S–S bond length is 2.22 Å, and the "thionate" and "thionite" S–O distances are 1.46 and 1.50 Å, respectively.

== Reactivity ==
Upon dissolution in water, bisulfite is generated:

Na_{2}S_{2}O_{5} + H_{2}O → 2 Na^{+} + 2 HSO_{3}^{−}

== Uses ==
Sodium and potassium metabisulfite have many major and niche uses. It is widely used for preserving food and beverages.

- Sodium metabisulphite is one of the main ingredients in "Drywhite", a composition used to prevent chipped potatoes oxidising during storage prior to use in many fish and chip shops.
- Sodium metabisulfite is added as an excipient to medications which contain adrenaline (epinephrine), in order to prevent the oxidation of adrenaline. For example, it is added to combination drug formulations which contain a local anaesthetic and adrenaline, and to the formulation in epinephrine autoinjectors, such as the EpiPen. This lengthens the shelf life of the formulation, although the sodium metabisulfite reacts with adrenaline, causing it to degrade and form epinephrine sulfonate.
- In combination with sodium hydrosulfite it is used as a rust-stain remover
- It is used in photography as an antioxidant in photographic film development.
- Concentrated sodium metabisulfite can be used to remove tree stumps. Some brands contain 98% sodium metabisulfite, and cause degradation of lignin in the stumps, facilitating removal.
- It is also used as an excipient in some tablets, such as paracetamol.
- It can be added to a blood smear in a test for sickle cell anaemia (and other similar forms of haemoglobin mutation). The substance causes defunct cells to sickle (through a complex polymerisation) hence confirming disease.
- It is used as a bleaching agent in the production of coconut cream.
- It (or liquid SO_{2}) is commonly used as an antimicrobial and antioxidant in winemaking; bottled wine indicates its use with the label "Contains Sulfites" in the US.
- It is used as a reducing agent to break sulfide bonds in shrunken items of clothing made of natural fibres, thus allowing the garment to go back to its original shape after washing.
- It is used as an SO_{2} source (mixed with air or oxygen) for the destruction of cyanide in commercial gold cyanidation processes.
- It is used as an SO_{2} source (mixed with air or oxygen) for the precipitation of elemental gold in chloroauric (aqua regia) solutions.
- It is used in the water treatment industry to quench residual chlorine.
- It is used in tint etching iron-based metal samples for microstructural analysis.
- It is used as a fungicide for anti-microbe and mould prevention during shipping of consumer goods such as shoes and clothing. Plastic stickers and packaging (such as Micro-Pak™) containing the anhydrous, sodium metabisulfite solid active ingredient are added prior to shipping. The devices absorb moisture from the atmosphere during shipping and release low levels of sulfur dioxide.
- It is used for preserving fruit during shipping.
- It is used as an additive in the extraction of starch from tubers, fruit, and cereal crops.
- It is used as a pickling agent to treat high pressure reverse osmosis and nanofiltration water desalination membranes for extended storage periods between uses.
- It is used to create a bisulfite adduct from ketones to aid in separation of the ketone product. The usage of metabisulfite versus the sulfite is also more entropically favourable.

== Safety ==
Sodium metabisulfite, despite not being flammable, decomposes at 150°C releasing toxic sulfur dioxide. It is corrosive when dissolved in water. Some people who are sulfite sensitive may experience an allergic reaction to sodium metabisulfite, sometimes severe, resulting in labeling requirements for food safety. In 2024, it was named ‘allergen of the year 2024’ by the American Contact Dermatitis Society.
