= Sodium sulfite =

Sodium sulphite
- Sodium sulfite

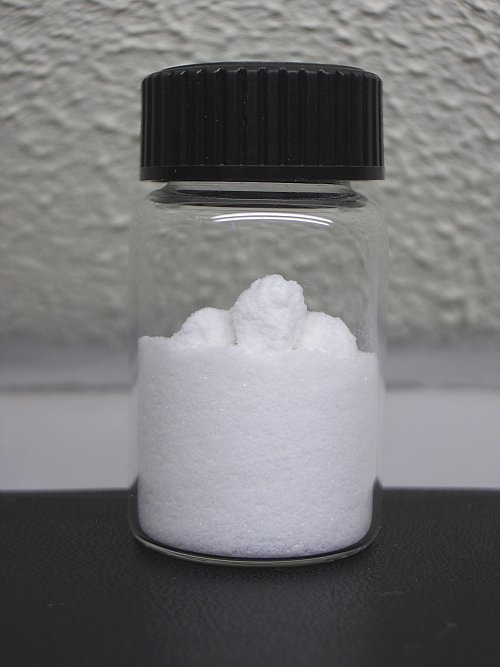
anhydrous
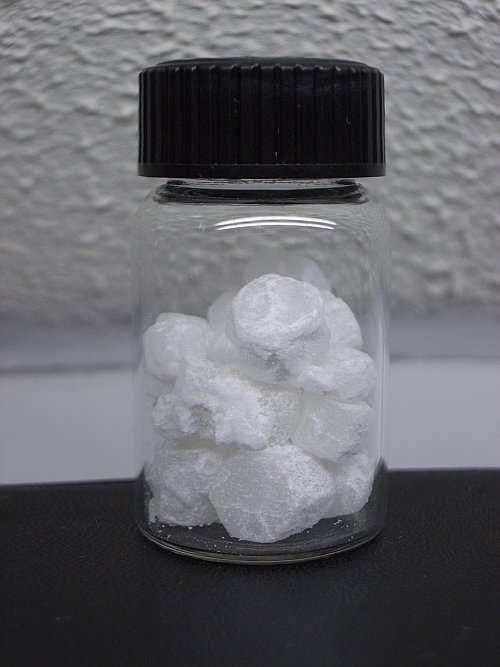
hydrate

Names
- IUPAC name Sodium sulfite
- Other names: Hypo clear (photography); E221

Identifiers
| CAS Number | 7757-83-7 |
| 3D model (JSmol) | Interactive image |
| ChEBI | CHEBI:86477 |
| ChemSpider | 22845 |
| ECHA InfoCard | 100.028.929 |
| EC Number | 231-821-4 |
| E number | E221 (preservatives) |
| PubChem CID | 24437 |
| RTECS number | WE2150000 |
| UNII | VTK01UQK3G |
| CompTox Dashboard (EPA) | DTXSID2044260 |
- InChI: InChI=1S/2Na.H2O3S/c;;1-4(2)3/h;;(H2,1,2,3)/q2*+1;/p-2 Key: GEHJYWRUCIMESM-UHFFFAOYSA-L; InChI=1/2Na.H2O3S/c;;1-4(2)3/h;;(H2,1,2,3)/q2*+1;/p-2 Key: GEHJYWRUCIMESM-NUQVWONBAK
- SMILES: [O-]S(=O)[O-].[Na+].[Na+]

Properties
| Chemical formula | Na_{2}SO_{3} |
| Molar mass | 126.043 g/mol |
| Appearance | White solid |
| Odor | Odorless |
| Density | 2.633 g/cm^{3} (anhydrous); 1.561 g/cm^{3} (heptahydrate) |
| Melting point | 33.4 °C (92.1 °F; 306.5 K) (dehydration of heptahydrate); 500 °C (anhydrous) |
| Boiling point | Decomposes |
| Solubility in water | 27.0 g/100 mL water (20 °C) |
| Solubility | Soluble in glycerol Insoluble in ammonia, chlorine |
| log P | −4 |
| Acidity (pK_{a}) | ~9 (heptahydrate) |
| Refractive index (n_{D}) | 1.565 |

Structure
| Crystal structure | Hexagonal (anhydrous); Monoclinic (heptahydrate) |

Hazards
| NFPA 704 (fire diamond) | 2 0 0 |
| Flash point | Non-flammable |
| Safety data sheet (SDS) | ICSC 1200 |

Related compounds
| Other anions | Sodium selenite |
| Other cations | Potassium sulfite |
| Related compounds | Sodium bisulfite Sodium metabisulfite Sodium sulfate |
- Except where otherwise noted, data are given for materials in their standard state (at 25 °C [77 °F], 100 kPa). verify (what is ?) Infobox references

Sodium sulfite (sodium sulphite) is the inorganic compound with the chemical formula Na_{2}SO_{3}. A white, water-soluble solid, it is used commercially as an antioxidant and preservative. It is also suitable for the softening of lignin in the pulping and refining processes of wood and lignocellulosic materials. A heptahydrate is also known but it is less useful because of its greater susceptibility toward oxidation by air.

== Preparation ==
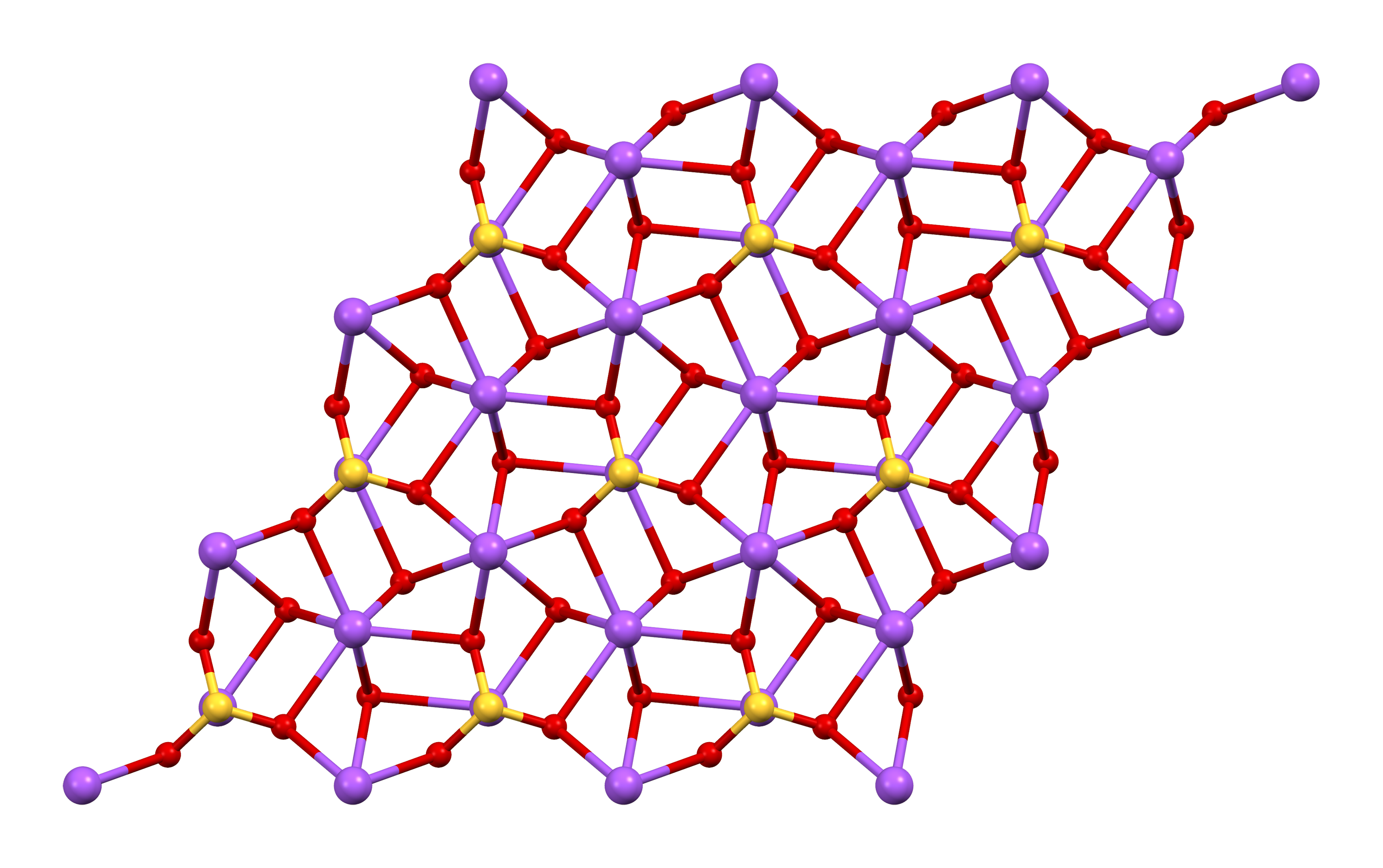
Structure of anhydrous sodium sulfite

Sodium sulfite can be prepared by treating a solution of sodium hydroxide with sulfur dioxide. When conducted in warm water, Na_{2}SO_{3} initially precipitates as a white solid. With more SO_{2}, the solid dissolves to give the disulfite, which crystallizes upon cooling.

SO_{2} + 2 NaOH → Na_{2}SO_{3} + H_{2}O

Sodium sulfite is made industrially by treating sulfur dioxide with a solution of sodium carbonate. The overall reaction is:

SO_{2} + Na_{2}CO_{3} → Na_{2}SO_{3} + CO_{2}

== Uses ==
Sodium sulfite is primarily used in the pulp and paper industry. It has been also applied in the thermomechanical conversion of wood to fibres (defibration) for producing medium density fibreboards (MDF).

As an oxygen scavenger agent, it is used to treat water being fed to steam boilers to avoid corrosion problems, in the photographic industry, it protects developer solutions from oxidation and (as hypo clear solution) to wash fixer (sodium thiosulfate) from film and photo-paper emulsions.

As a reducing agent it is used in the textile industry as a bleaching, desulfurizing, and dechlorinating agent (e.g. in swimming pools). Its reducing properties are exploited in its use as a preservative to prevent dried fruit from discoloring, and for preserving meats.

It is used as a reagent in sulfonation and sulfomethylation agent. It is used in the production of sodium thiosulfate.

The Wellman–Lord process utilizes sodium sulfite for flue gas desulfurization.

== Reactions ==
Sodium sulfite is primarily used as a mild reducing agent. The heptahydrate crystals effloresce in warm dry air. Heptahydrate crystals also oxidize in air to form sodium sulfate. The anhydrous form is more resistant to oxidation by air.

== Structure ==
According to X-ray crystallography sodium sulfite heptahydrate features pyramidal SO_{3}^{2-} centers. The S-O distances are 1.50 and the O-S-O angles are near 106º.
