= Potassium bisulfite =

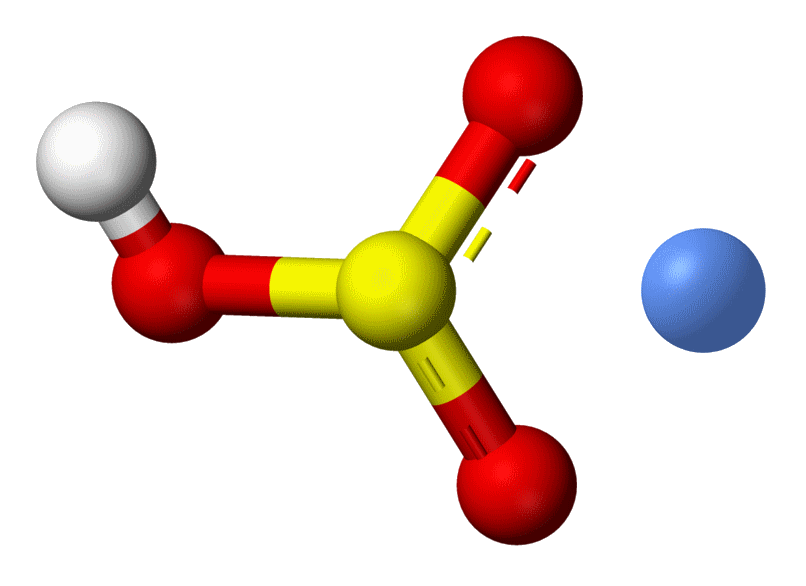

Names
- IUPAC name Potassium hydrogen sulfite
- Other names: Potassium bisulfite; potassium bisulphite; monopotassium salt; monopotassium sulfite; potassium hydrosulfite

Identifiers
CAS Number	7773-03-7
3D model (JSmol)	Interactive image
ChemSpider	22889
ECHA InfoCard	100.028.973
EC Number	231-870-1
E number	E228 (preservatives)
PubChem CID	23663620
UNII	QJK5LO891P
CompTox Dashboard (EPA)	DTXSID6064795
- InChI: InChI=1S/K.H2O3S/c;1-4(2)3/h;(H2,1,2,3)/q+1;/p-1
- SMILES: OS(=O)[O-].[K+]

Properties
Chemical formula	KHSO_{3}
Molar mass	120.1561 g/mol
Appearance	White crystalline powder
Odor	SO_{2}-like
Melting point	190 °C (374 °F; 463 K) (decomposes)
Solubility in water	49 g/100 mL (20 °C); 115 g/100 mL (100 °C)
Solubility	Insoluble in alcohol
- Except where otherwise noted, data are given for materials in their standard state (at 25 °C [77 °F], 100 kPa). verify (what is ?) Infobox references

Potassium bisulfite (or potassium hydrogen sulfite) is a chemical mixture with the approximately correctly mentioned formula chemical formula KHSO_{3}. Potassium bisulfite in fact is not an actual compound, but a mixture of salts that dissolve in water to give solutions composed of potassium ions and bisulfite ions. It is a white solid with an odor of sulfur dioxide. Attempts to crystallize potassium bisulfite yield potassium metabisulfite, K_{2}S_{2}O_{5}.

Potassium bisulfite is used as a sterilising agent in the production of alcoholic beverages. This additive is classified as E number E228 under the current EU-approved food additive legislation.

== Production ==
It is made by the reaction of sulfur dioxide and potassium carbonate. The sulfur dioxide is passed through a solution of the potassium carbonate until no more carbon dioxide is evolved. The solution is concentrated.

== See also ==
- Calcium bisulfite
- Sodium bisulfite
