= Sodium stearoyl lactylate =

Names
- Preferred IUPAC name Sodium 2-{[2-(octadecanoyloxy)propanoyl]oxy}propanoate
- Other names octadecanoic acid, 2-(1-carboxyethoxy)-1-methyl-2-oxoethyl ester, sodium salt; sodium 2-{[2-(stearoyloxy)propanoyl]oxy}propanoate; sodium stearoyl lactylate; sodium stearoyl-2-lactylate; sodium stearyl-2-lactylate; sodium 2-stearoyllactylate; sodium stelate; stearoyl-2-lactylic acid, sodium salt; sodium alpha-(alpha-(stearoyloxy)propionyloxy)propionate; sodium 2-(1-carboxyethoxy)-1-methyl-2-oxoethyloctadecanoate; stearic acid, ester with lactate of lactic acid, sodium salt; stearic acid ester with lactic acid bimol. ester sodium salt; sodium 2-(1-carboxylatoethoxy)-1-methyl-2-oxoethyl stearate

Identifiers
CAS Number	25383-99-7
3D model (JSmol)	Interactive image
ChemSpider	8065662
ECHA InfoCard	100.042.648
EC Number	246-929-7
E number	E481 (thickeners, ...)
PubChem CID	23671849
UNII	IN99IT31LN
CompTox Dashboard (EPA)	DTXSID8027872
- InChI: InChI=1S/C24H44O6.Na/c1-4-5-6-7-8-9-10-11-12-13-14-15-16-17-18-19-22(25) 29-21(3)24(28)30-20(2)23(26)27;/h20-21H,4-19H2,1-3H3,(H,26,27);/q;+1/p-1
- SMILES: O=C(C(C)OC(CCCCCCCCCCCCCCCCC)=O)OC(C)C([O-])=O.[Na+]

Properties
Chemical formula	C_{24}H_{43}NaO_{6}
Molar mass	450.592 g·mol^{−1}
Appearance	a white or cream-colored powder with a caramel odor
Density	1.063 g/cm^{3}
Melting point	49 °C (120 °F; 322 K)
Solubility in water	dispersible in warm water
- Except where otherwise noted, data are given for materials in their standard state (at 25 °C [77 °F], 100 kPa). verify (what is ?) Infobox references

Sodium stearoyl-2-lactylate (sodium stearoyl lactylate or SSL) is a versatile, FDA approved food additive used to improve the mix tolerance and volume of processed foods. It is one type of a commercially available lactylate. SSL is non-toxic, biodegradable, and typically manufactured using biorenewable feedstocks. Because SSL is a safe and highly effective food additive, it is used in a wide variety of products ranging from baked goods and desserts to pet foods.

As described by the Food Chemicals Codex 7th edition, SSL is a cream-colored powder or brittle solid. SSL is currently manufactured by the esterification of stearic acid with lactic acid and partially neutralized with either food-grade soda ash (sodium carbonate) or caustic soda (concentrated sodium hydroxide). Commercial grade SSL is a mixture of sodium salts of stearoyl lactylic acids and minor proportions of other sodium salts of related acids. The HLB for SSL is 10–12. SSL is slightly hygroscopic, soluble in ethanol and in hot oil or fat, and dispersible in warm water. These properties are the reason that SSL is an excellent emulsifier for fat-in-water emulsions and can also function as a humectant.

== Food labeling requirements ==
To be labeled as SSL for sale within the United States, the product must conform to the specifications detailed in 21 CFR 172.846 and the "Food Chemicals Codex", 3d Ed. (1981), pp. 300–301. In the EU, the product must conform to the specifications detailed in Regulation (EC) No 96/77. For the 7th edition of the FCC and Regulation (EC) No 96/77, these specifications are:

Specific Test	Acceptance Criterion (FCC)	Acceptance Criterion (EU)
Acid Value	60–80	60–130
Ester Value	150–190	90–190
Sodium Content	3.5–5.0%	2.5–5%
Total Recoverable Lactic Acid	31.0–34.0%	15–40%

To be labeled as SSL for sale in other regions, the product must conform to the specifications detailed in that region's codex.

== Food applications and maximum use levels ==
SSL finds widespread application in baked goods, pancakes, waffles, cereals, pastas, instant rice, desserts, icings, fillings, puddings, toppings, sugar confectionaries, powdered beverage mixes, creamers, cream liqueurs, dehydrated potatoes, snack dips, sauces, gravies, chewing gum, dietetic foods, minced and diced canned meats, mostarda di frutta, and pet food. Approved uses and maximum use levels in the United States are described in 21 CFR 172.846 and 21 CFR 177.120. In the European Union, the approved uses and maximum use levels are described in Regulation (EC) No 95/2.

United States		European Union			
Application	Maximum Use Level	Application	Maximum Use Level	Application	Maximum Use Level
Baked goods, pancakes, waffles	0.5% of flour	Fine baked goods	5 g/kg	Bread	3 g/kg
Icings, fillings, puddings, toppings	0.2%	Fat Emulsions	10 g/kg	Desserts	5 g/kg
Beverage creamers	0.3%	Beverage whiteners	3 g/kg	Hot powder beverage mixes	2 g/L
Dehydrated potatoes	0.5%	Quick cook rice	4 g/kg	Breakfast cereals	5 g/kg
Snack dips	0.2%	Cereal-based snacks	2 g/kg	Cereal- and potato-based snacks	5 g/kg
Sauces and gravies	0.25%	Minced and diced canned meats	4 g/kg	Mostarda di frutta	2 g/kg
Prepared mixes of above	As indicated above	Chewing gum	2 g/kg	Sugar confectionery	5 g/kg
Cream liqueurs	0.5%	Emulsified Liqueur	8 g/L	Spirits <15% alcohol	8 g/L
Cellophane	0.5% weight of cellophane	Dietetic foods	2 g/L		

The largest marketed use of SSL is in yeast-raised bakery products. SSL is used in the majority of manufactured breads, buns, wraps, tortillas, and similar bread-based products to ensure consistent product quality. Use levels for baked goods will vary between 0.25–0.5% based on flour. The typical application level is 0.375% and will be adjusted depending on the type and quality of flour used.

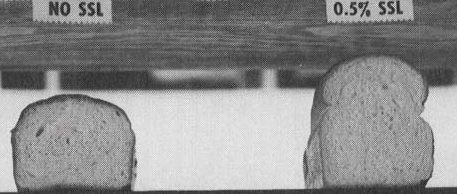
The effect of SSL on bread volume

Compared to calcium stearoyl-2-lactylate (CSL), SSL offers some advantages. First, SSL disperses and hydrates more readily in water than CSL. Therefore, SSL does not require pre-hydration. Second, SSL provides better crumb softening than CSL. SSL's crumb softening effect is noticeable up to 5–7 days after baking. Third, in rich bread formulations (e.g. pan bread and hamburger buns), SSL provides better dough strengthening than CSL. Use of SSL in these formulations will yield (nearly) perfect symmetry in the finished baked good. Because of these characteristics, SSL is currently used in more baking applications than CSL.

Research has explored the possibility of replacing SSL with the use of enzymes. Enzyme technologies, by themselves, have not been able to completely replace SSL. A major limitation of enzymes is the production of gummy bread of unpredictable quality. Also, enzymes often do not augment dough strength, which is necessary to prevent loaf collapse during baking. Currently, enzymes are being used in conjunction with SSL to maximize the shelf life of bread. SSL is very good at increasing softness of bread during the first week after baking. Enzyme technology works best after the first five days of shelf life. Therefore, bread with optimal softness throughout the desired shelf life is obtained by using a combination of these technologies.

== Health and safety ==
Lactylates, including SSL, have been subjected to extensive safety evaluations prior to being FDA approved for use as a food additive. The oral LD_{50} of SSL for rats was established by Schuler and Thornton in 1952 as being over 25 g/kg body weight. In 2010, Lamb established the no-observed-adverse-effect level of SSL at 5% of the total diet and recommended an acceptable daily intake of 22.1 mg/kg bw/day for human consumption.
