= Lactylate =

Class of organic compounds

Lactylates are organic compounds that are FDA approved for use as food additives and cosmetic ingredients, e.g. as food-grade emulsifiers. These additives are non-toxic, biodegradable, and typically manufactured using biorenewable feedstocks. Owing to their safety and versatile functionality, lactylates are used in a wide variety of food and non-food applications. In the United States, the Food Chemicals Codex specifies the labeling requirements for food ingredients including lactylates. In the European Union, lactylates must be labelled in accordance with the requirements of the applicable EU regulation. Lactylates may be labelled as calcium stearoyl lactylate (CSL), sodium stearoyl lactylate (SSL), or lactylic esters of fatty acids (LEFA).

CSL, SSL, and food-grade LEFAs are used in a variety of products including baked goods and mixes, pancakes, waffles, cereals, pastas, instant rice, liquid shortenings, egg whites, whipped toppings, icings, fillings, puddings, toppings, frozen desserts, creamers, cream liqueurs, sugar confectionaries, dehydrated fruits and vegetables, dehydrated potatoes, snack dips, chewing gum, dietetic foods, minced and diced canned meats, mostarda di frutta, sauces, gravies, and pet food. In addition, these lactylates are FDA approved for use in food packaging, such as paper, paperboard, and cellophane, and pharmaceuticals. Lactylates are also used in a variety of personal care products including shampoos, skin conditioners, lotions, barrier creams, makeup bases, lipsticks, deodorants, and shaving creams. In addition, lactylates are bio-friendly additives for use in polyolefins, flame retardants, pigments, and PVC.

== History ==
Lactylates were developed in the 1950s by the C.J. Patterson Company as non-petrochemical alternatives to Sta-Soft, a polyoxyethylene derivative of stearic acid, for delaying the staling of bread. The research into the development of lactylates led to the first lactylate patent application, filed in 1951, and two issued patents in 1956 and 1957. These patents included lab-scale manufacture and applications of several lactylates, including CSL and SSL. In 1954, the inventors published an article showing that CSL improved mix tolerance, bread volume and overall quality. CSL won FDA approval for use as a food additive in April 1961 and was first used as a commercial bakery additive in the United States in 1962. The research was acknowledged as a major achievement in the baking industry, winning the Food Technology Industrial Achievement Award in 1965. SSL use as a bakery additive followed in 1968.

== Manufacturing ==
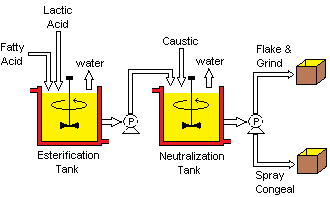
Lactylate manufacturing process

The original lab-scale preparation of lactylates involved esterification of lactic acid or poly(lactic acid) with an acid chloride derivative of the desired fatty acid. Current manufacturing practices were patented in January 1956 and combine fatty acids (e.g. naturally derived stearic acid) and lactic acid at elevated temperatures. For CSL and SSL, the stearic acid component is typically produced from vegetable oils such as soybean oil or palm oil.

Lactic acid is primarily produced by lactic acid fermentation of sugar with lactic acid bacteria (similar to the bacteria used to produce yogurt). The sugar can be sucrose, fructose, or glucose obtained from corn, sugar beet or sugar cane. Because the lactic acid is derived from plant sources and not from milk or milk products, it does not contain any residual lactose. Therefore, people who are lactose intolerant can consume lactylates without concern.

Lactylates, in the free acid form, are not readily water dispersable. To improve the water dispersibility and emulsification properties, the carboxylic acids comprising lactylates can be neutralized using hydroxides or carbonates of group 1 or group 2 metals such as sodium or calcium.

At room temperature, lactylates can be viscous liquids or solids depending on the starting fatty acid, the total recoverable lactic acid content, and the degree of neutralization. Solid lactylates are often processed into powders. The traditional method is to solidify the liquid into a flake and grind the resulting flake into a powder. Newer methods utilize spray congealing to directly form beads.

The manufacturing process of lactylates is an esterification reaction. The water coproduct is removed by evaporation to drive the reaction towards the desired product composition in accordance with Le Chatelier's principle. Water removal is accomplished either by sparging with a constant stream of dry nitrogen or by vacuum outgassing with the use of a vacuum pump system. Using nitrogen sparging or vacuum outgassing also protects the reaction mixture from undesirable oxidation processes.

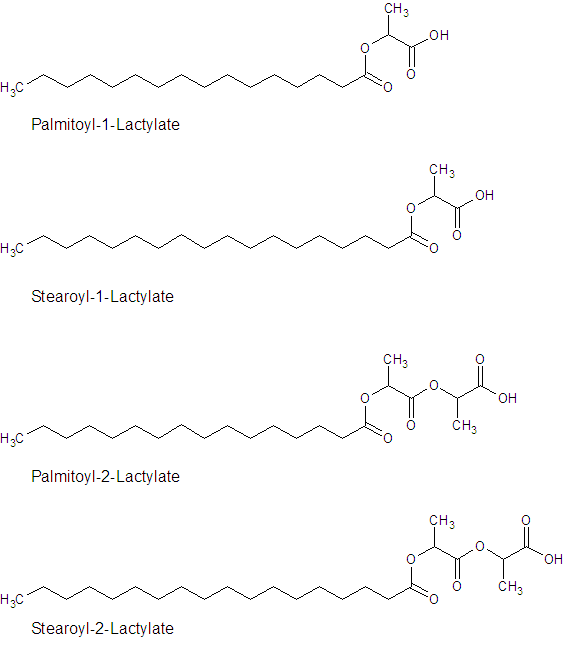
Structure of lactylate species

The manufacturing process does not produce chemically pure lactylates (e.g. stearoyl-2-lactylate) for two reasons. First, the source fatty acid is not chemically pure since it is typically derived from natural sources. The source fatty acid may contain varying ratios of different fatty acids (e.g. lauric acid (C12:0), myristic acid (C14:0), palmitic acid (C16:0), stearic acid (C18:0), arachidic acid (C20:0), behenic acid (C22:0), etc.). Second, lactic acid readily undergoes self-esterification producing a variety of polylactyls (typically numbering from one to three lactyl groups).

Chemically pure lactylates (e.g. stearoyl-1-lactylate, stearoyl-2-lactylate, etc.) can be produced through an intermediate benzyl ether derivative. This synthetic pathway provides a convenient route to the production of analytical standards of the individual lactylate components.

== Functionality ==
=== Overview ===
1. Two immiscible liquids, not yet emulsified; 2. An emulsion of Phase II dispersed in Phase I.; 3. The unstable emulsion progressively separates; 4. The surfactant (purple outline around particles) positions itself on the interfaces between Phase II and Phase I, stabilizing the emulsion

Due to differences in physical properties, oil does not readily mix with water. Many food and non-food systems require stabilization of mixtures of oil and water in order to prevent phase separation. Therefore, additives are used to provide stability. Lactylates are such additives.

Lactylates are surface active and are therefore surfactants. Lactylates contain hydrophilic polar groups, which interact with water, and non-polar lipophilic groups, which interact with fats and oils. These interactions provide stability to an oil/water system resulting in the formation of an emulsion. Therefore, lactylates are often referred to as emulsifiers. The degree of interaction is dependent on the identity of the fatty acid, the mole ratio of fatty acid to lactic acid, the degree of neutralization and the nature of the neutralizing base (if applicable) used in the manufacture of the lactylate.

As described in the next two sections, applications of lactylates extend beyond their use as surfactants in both food and non-food systems. Such applications include strengthening dough, delaying bread staling, enhancing foam, and preventing microbial growth.

=== Food applications ===
The largest food application of lactylates is in the manufacture of baked goods such as yeast-leavened bakery products. In these systems, lactylates are added to strengthen dough and delay bread staling (i.e. soften the crumb). Dough in commercial bakeries requires some resistance to mechanical abuse and shock to maintain desirable volume in the finished baked good. Dough strengtheners interact with the protein components (e.g. gluten) in the dough. The interactions reinforce the protein network, preventing collapse of the loaf during baking. These additives ensure each loaf of bread conforms to the visual and textural quality expectations of the manufacturer and consumer. Crumb softeners are added to bread to reduce or delay staling of the finished baked good. Bread staling occurs when the starch components form hard crystals. Crumb softeners complex with the starch components, preventing or delaying the formation of starch crystals. Lactylate enriched bread will remain fresh for up to five days after baking. Bread prepared without lactylates begins to stale within one to three days after production.

In other food applications, lactylates are used as emulsifiers. For example, lactylates are used in non-dairy creamers to help disperse the fat-based creamer throughout the hot beverage. The lactylate stabilizes (i.e. prevents separation of) the oil-in-water emulsion. Another use of lactylates is as whipping agents. In these applications, the lactylate helps aeration of the continuous phase (e.g. egg whites) and stabilization (prevention of collapse) of the resulting foams. In these systems, lactylates are added to decrease the interfacial tension between the mutually insoluble components providing stability to the mixture, referred to as a colloidal suspension.

=== Non-food applications ===
Lactylates are also widely used in non-food applications such as cosmetics or personal care products. In these applications, lactylates function as emulsifiers, conditioners, foam boosters, or plasticizers. These lactylates are typically manufactured from behenic acid, isostearic acid, or medium-chain fatty acids such as capric acid, lauric acid, and myristic acid. The lactylates may also be partially neutralized. For these applications, calcium salts are not typically used, since the resulting lactylates will not be as readily water dispersible as the sodium analog.

Lactylated esters of fatty acids (LEFAs) manufactured using medium-chain fatty acids (e.g. capric or lauric acids) are microbicides. A recent study indicated that the LEFA sodium lauroyl lactylate might be an effective antimicrobial against the gram-positive bacterium Clostridium perfringens. This bacterium affects the digestive system of poultry, reducing the growth rate of the chickens thereby requiring more time to reach maturity. Antibiotics are often added to poultry feed to help prevent infection and maintain healthy growth. EU legislation banned use of antibiotics for growth promotion on January 1, 2006. Therefore, the industry is looking for viable alternatives.

Some lactylates also have the potential for being biodegradable, biorenewable replacements for certain petroleum-based surfactants, such as ethoxylated alcohols. Preliminary investigations also show that lactylates could be used in oil remediation or recovery applications.

== Environmental fate ==
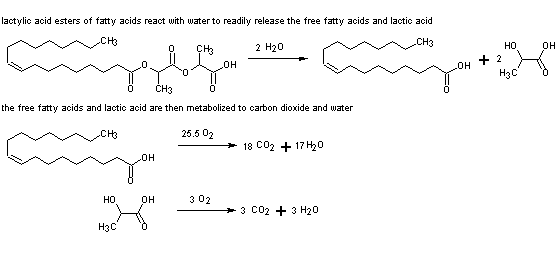
Lactylate environmental fate pathway

A 2007 study done by Wildlife International, Ltd. determined a lactylate's ready biodegradability by the carbon dioxide evolution test method. The study was performed on a LEFA sodium salt produced from oleic acid and lactic acid. The test method determines if microbes, in this case activated sludge inoculum, can digest a test material, thereby returning the carbon-based material back into the environment as carbon dioxide to complete the carbon cycle. To meet or exceed the OECD Guideline 301B criteria for "readily biodegradable", a sample must produce 60% of the theoretical amount of carbon dioxide (TCO_{2}) within a 10-day window of reaching 10% TCO_{2}. The LEFA used in the study had a final average cumulative percent biodegradation of 92.0% and the test solution had a pH of 7.1 at the end of the 28-day test. Therefore, the test material met the criteria to be considered readily biodegradable. In the presence of water, lactylates will break down (hydrolyze) into fatty acid and lactic acid. Based on all available information, lactylates do not meet any hazard categories under SARA Title III, Sections 311–313.

== Health and safety ==
=== Overview ===
Lactylates have been subjected to extensive safety evaluations prior to being FDA approved for use as food additives. The first safety evaluations were initiated by the C.J. Patterson Company in 1950. These biochemical and toxicology studies focused on Verv, calcium stearoyl-2-lactylate. Data collected from eighteen separate investigations over eleven years were extensively reviewed by physiologists, toxicologists, and statisticians. The results of these studies conclusively demonstrated lactylates to be non-toxic by ingestion leading to FDA approval in April 1961. Research into the safety of lactylates has since continued, with the latest study being completed in 2010. The results of each new study have confirmed the safety of lactylates.

=== Metabolism ===
A 1961 in vitro study conducted by Hodge showed that lipase will hydrolyze lactylates into stearic acid and lactic acid. A 1981 study expanded this research by treating various tissue and biological fluid preparations with ^{14}C-labeled CSL, incubated at 37 °C (98.6 °F), and examined for lactylate hydrolysis. Assays used thin layer chromatography (TLC) with radioactivity detection to determine the levels of intact CSL and lactate (lactic acid). ^{14}C-labeled CSL was found to undergo rapid hydrolysis in homogenized rat, mouse, and guinea-pig liver and intestinal mucosa, whereas CSL hydrolyzed much slower in rat and mice whole blood. In human duodenal mucosa, CSL rapidly hydrolyzed, while CSL showed no significant hydrolysis in human whole blood.

Two metabolism studies were conducted by Hodge in 1961. The first showed that rats fed either SSL or CSL excreted only traces of lactate in fecal fat. The second study showed that 60% of the total ^{14}C from ^{14}C-labeled CSL was excreted as ^{14}CO_{2} within 24 hours when fed to rats. The results were found to be virtually identical (58%) to a physical mixture of stearic acid and ^{14}C-labeled lactic acid. A follow up study in mice and guinea-pigs was conducted in 1981 using ^{14}C-labeled CSL and lactic acid. The authors concluded that excretion of both CSL and lactic acid followed a respiration pathway (excretion via CO_{2}) followed by excretion as urine and feces. Most of the excretion occurred within the first 7 hours of the study. Chromatography on the urine showed most of the radioactivity co-eluted with lactic acid, implying that CSL was hydrolyzed during metabolism.

=== Acute toxicity ===
A 1952 study by Schuler and Thornton established the oral LD_{50} of SSL in rats as over 25 g/kg body weight.

=== Chronic toxicity ===
Several feeding studies were conducted on rats starting in the 1950s. The researchers varied the test duration (27 days to 6 months), type of lactylate (CSL, SSL and SLA), and dose levels (0.5–25%) as well as number of rats and gender. A few of the studies compared lactylates to physical mixtures of lactate salts (sodium or calcium), stearic acid, and lactic acid. In most studies, the lactylate-fed rats were compared to control groups fed normal diets. The primary conclusions established the no-observed-adverse-effect level (NOAEL) for rats at 2%. Higher levels could produce growth retardation or increased relative liver weights, especially if the test diets had high levels of saturated fatty acids from lactylates or other fatty acid sources. Rats fed lactylates supplemented with a fat high in unsaturated fatty acids (achieving a desired 0.6 ratio saturated to unsaturated fatty acid ratio) had normal liver weights. If the test rats were switched back to a normal diet, growth rates recovered. These results established the acceptable daily intake (ADI) levels for CSL and SSL as 20 mg/kg bw/day.

Another feeding study was conducted on dogs. The test group was fed 7.5% CSL for two years, and the results were compared to the results from a control group fed a regular diet. The test group showed no adverse effects and all test results were normal. When one dog was given 7.5% CSL for one month, 12.5% for two weeks, and 15% for another month, no changes were seen in the blood, organ weights or tissue appearance.

More recently, an investigation of the chronic toxicity of SSL was conducted on rats. Four different levels (0%, 1.25%, 2.5%, and 5%) were fed to male and female Wistar WU rats over the course of a year. The results showed that SSL is well tolerated by the test rats at all dose levels. The authors recommended a revised NOAEL of 5% and an ADI of 22.1 mg/kg bw/day for human consumption.

=== Contact dermatitis ===
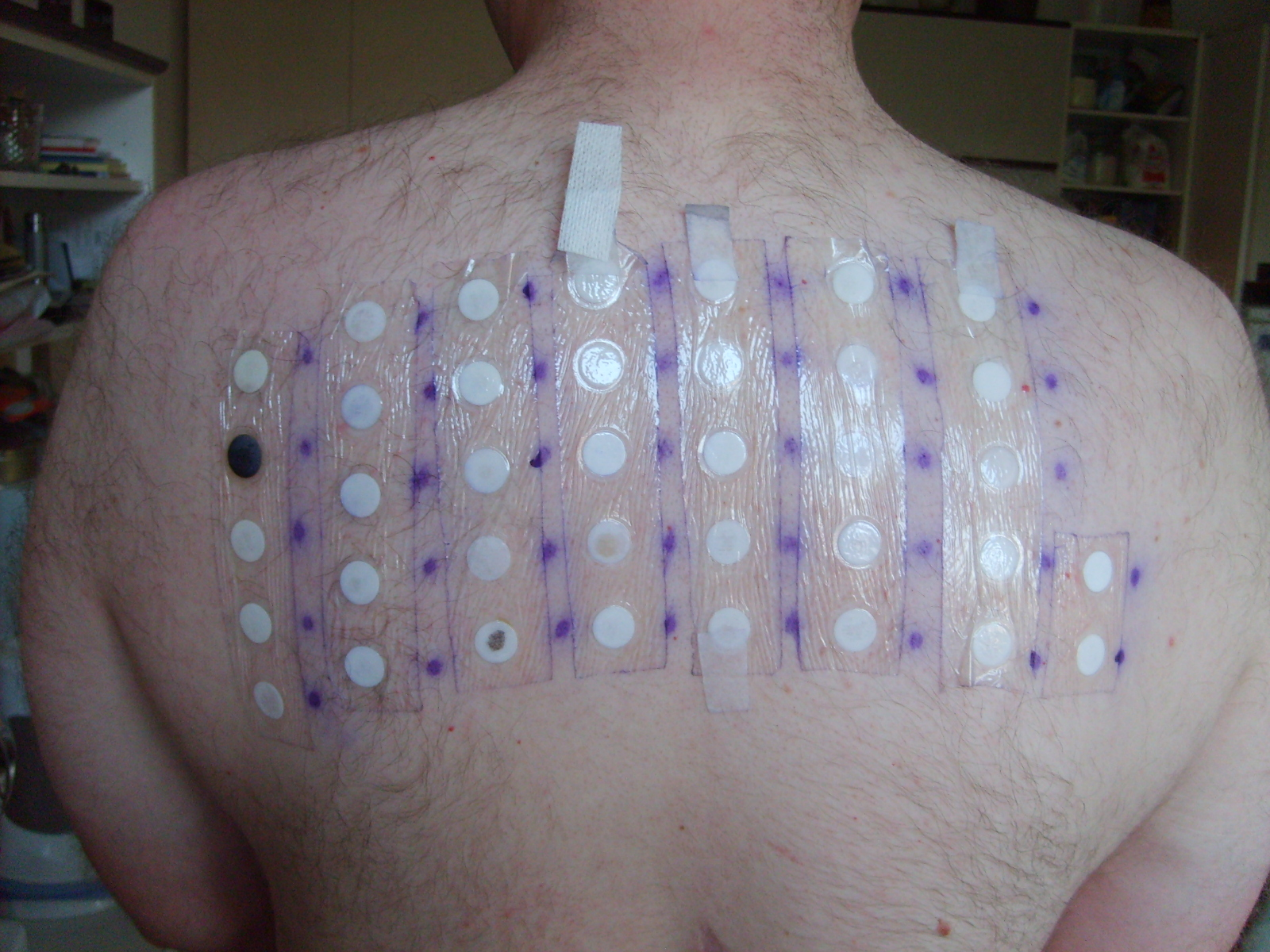
Patch test

One non-peer-reviewed case study was reported in 2005 by Danish doctors regarding a 61-year-old woman with a history of contact allergies. Patch tests showed a strong positive reaction from a 5% SSL in petrolatum solution. The patch tests were extended to include 26 individuals with no history of allergies. These controls were administered a patch test of the same preparation. The test results showed 11 negative responses, 14 doubtful/probably irritant responses and only 1 mild positive response. The authors concluded that the original subject "belongs to a group of patients who have sensitive, labile skin that easily contract new allergies." Thus, the 61-year-old woman had apparently developed a sensitization towards SSL.

== Commercially available lactylates ==
=== Calcium stearoyl-2-lactylate ===
==== Overview ====
Structure of CSL

Calcium stearoyl-2-lactylate (calcium stearoyl lactylate or CSL) is a versatile, FDA approved food additive. CSL is non-toxic, biodegradable, and typically manufactured using biorenewable feedstocks. Because CSL is a safe and highly effective food additive, it is used in a wide variety of products from baked goods and desserts to packaging.

As described by the Food Chemicals Codex 7th edition, CSL is a cream-colored powder. CSL is currently manufactured by the esterification of stearic acid and lactic acid with partial neutralization using food-grade hydrated lime (calcium hydroxide). Commercial grade CSL is a mixture of calcium salts of stearoyl lactic acid, with minor proportions of other salts of related acids. The HLB for CSL is 5.1. It is slightly soluble in hot water. The pH of a 2% aqueous suspension is approximately 4.7.

==== Food labeling requirements ====
To be labeled as CSL for sale within the United States, the product must conform to the specifications detailed in 21 CFR 172.844. In the EU, the product must conform to the specifications detailed in Regulation (EC) No 96/77. Tests for these specifications can be found in the Food Chemical Codex,. Acceptance criteria for these two regions are as follows:

| Specific Test | Acceptance Criterion (FCC) | Acceptance Criterion (EU) |
|---|---|---|
| Acid Value | 50–86 | 50–130 |
| Calcium Content | 4.2–5.2% | 1–5.2% |
| Ester Value | 125–164 | 125–190 |
| Total Recoverable Lactic Acid | 32.0–38.0% | 15–40% |

To be labeled as CSL for sale in other regions, the product must conform to the specifications detailed in that region's codex.

==== Food applications and maximum use levels ====
CSL finds widespread application in baked goods, cereals, pastas, instant rice, desserts, icings, fillings, puddings, toppings, sugar confectionaries, powdered beverage mixes, creamers, cream liqueurs, dehydrated potatoes, snack dips, sauces, gravies, chewing gum, dietetic foods, minced and diced canned meats, and mostarda di frutta. In the United States, approved uses and use levels are described in 21 CFR 172.844, 21 CFR 176.170 and 21 CFR 177.120. while the corresponding regulations in the EU are listed in Regulation (EC) No 95/2.

| United States | | European Union | | | | | |
| Application | Maximum Use Level | Application | Maximum Use Level | Application | Maximum Use Level | Application | Maximum Use Level |
|---|---|---|---|---|---|---|---|
| Yeast leavened bakery products | 0.5% of flour | Fine baked goods | 5 g/kg | Bread | 3 g/kg | Breakfast cereals | 5 g/kg |
| Liquid and frozen egg whites | 0.05% | Fat Emulsions | 10 g/kg | Desserts | 5 g/kg | Sugar confectionery | 5 g/kg |
| Dried egg whites | 0.5% | Beverage whiteners | 3 g/kg | Hot powder beverage mixes | 2 g/L | Dietetic foods | 2 g/L |
| Whipped vegetable oil topping | 0.3% | Quick cook rice | 4 g/kg | Minced and diced canned meats | 4 g/kg | Mostarda di frutta | 2 g/kg |
| Dehydrated potatoes | 0.5% | Cereal-based snacks | 2 g/kg | Cereal- and potato-based snacks | 5 g/kg | Chewing gum | 2 g/kg |
| Paper and paperboard packaging component | Not Limited | Emulsified Liqueur | 8 g/L | Spirits <15% alcohol | 8 g/L | | |
| Cellophane | 0.5% weight of cellophane | | | | | | |

The largest application of CSL is in yeast leavened bakery products. Although CSL was introduced to the market first, most applications utilize SSL. The main reason for the preference of SSL over CSL is that CSL has less crumb softening effects than SSL. However, CSL is still preferred in some applications, such as lean hearth bread type formulations. In these applications, CSL is preferred because CSL performs better than SSL as a dough strengthener, while the finished product does not require a soft crumb or a perfectly symmetrical loaf shape.

=== Sodium stearoyl-2-lactylate ===
==== Overview ====
Structure of SSL

Sodium stearoyl-2-lactylate (sodium stearoyl lactylate or SSL) is a versatile, FDA approved food additive. SSL is non-toxic, biodegradable, and typically manufactured using biorenewable feedstocks. Because SSL is a safe and highly effective food additive, it is used in a wide variety of products ranging from baked goods and desserts to pet foods.

As described by the Food Chemicals Codex 7th edition, SSL is a cream-colored powder or brittle solid. SSL is currently manufactured by the esterification of stearic acid with lactic acid and partially neutralized with either food-grade soda ash (sodium carbonate) or caustic soda (concentrated sodium hydroxide). Commercial grade SSL is a mixture of sodium salts of stearoyl lactylic acids and minor proportions of other sodium salts of related acids. The HLB for SSL is 10–12. SSL is slightly hygroscopic, soluble in ethanol and in hot oil or fat, and dispersible in warm water. These properties are the reason that SSL is an excellent emulsifier for fat-in-water emulsions and can also function as a humectant.

==== Food labeling requirements ====
To be labeled as SSL for sale within the United States, the product must conform to the specifications detailed in 21 CFR 172.846 and the most recent edition of the Food Chemical Codex. In the EU, the product must conform to the specifications detailed in Regulation (EC) No 96/77. For the 7th edition of the FCC and Regulation (EC) No 96/77, these specifications are:

| Specific Test | Acceptance Criterion (FCC) | Acceptance Criterion (EU) |
|---|---|---|
| Acid Value | 60–80 | 60–130 |
| Ester Value | 120–190 | 90–190 |
| Sodium Content | 3.5–5.0% | 2.5–5% |
| Total Recoverable Lactic Acid | 23.0–34.0% | 15–40% |

To be labeled as SSL for sale in other regions, the product must conform to the specifications detailed in that region's codex.

==== Food applications and maximum use levels ====
SSL finds widespread application in baked goods, pancakes, waffles, cereals, pastas, instant rice, desserts, icings, fillings, puddings, toppings, sugar confectionaries, powdered beverage mixes, creamers, cream liqueurs, dehydrated potatoes, snack dips, sauces, gravies, chewing gum, dietetic foods, minced and diced canned meats, mostarda di frutta, and pet food. Approved uses and maximum use levels in the United States are described in 21 CFR 172.846 and 21 CFR 177.120. In the European Union, the approved uses and maximum use levels are described in Regulation (EC) No 95/2.

| United States | | European Union | | | |
| Application | Maximum Use Level | Application | Maximum Use Level | Application | Maximum Use Level |
|---|---|---|---|---|---|
| Baked goods, pancakes, waffles | 0.5% of flour | Fine baked goods | 5 g/kg | Bread | 3 g/kg |
| Icings, fillings, puddings, toppings | 0.2% | Fat Emulsions | 10 g/kg | Desserts | 5 g/kg |
| Beverage creamers | 0.3% | Beverage whiteners | 3 g/kg | Hot powder beverage mixes | 2 g/L |
| Dehydrated potatoes | 0.5% | Quick cook rice | 4 g/kg | Breakfast cereals | 5 g/kg |
| Snack dips | 0.2% | Cereal-based snacks | 2 g/kg | Cereal- and potato-based snacks | 5 g/kg |
| Sauces and gravies | 0.25% | Minced and diced canned meats | 4 g/kg | Mostarda di frutta | 2 g/kg |
| Prepared mixes of above | As indicated above | Chewing gum | 2 g/kg | Sugar confectionery | 5 g/kg |
| Cream liqueurs | 0.5% | Emulsified Liqueur | 8 g/L | Spirits <15% alcohol | 8 g/L |
| Cellophane | 0.5% weight of cellophane | Dietetic foods | 2 g/L | | |

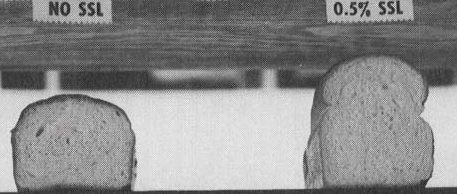
The effect of SSL on bread volume

The largest marketed use of SSL is in yeast-raised bakery products. SSL is used in the majority of manufactured breads, buns, wraps, tortillas, and similar bread-based products to ensure consistent product quality. Use levels for baked goods will vary between 0.25–0.5% based on flour. The typical application level is 0.375% and will be adjusted depending on the type and quality of flour used.

Compared to CSL, SSL offers some advantages. First, SSL disperses and hydrates more readily in water than CSL. Therefore, SSL does not require pre-hydration. Second, SSL provides better crumb softening than CSL. SSL's crumb softening effect is noticeable up to 5–7 days after baking. Third, in rich bread formulations (e.g. pan bread and hamburger buns), SSL provides better dough strengthening than CSL. Use of SSL in these formulations will yield (nearly) perfect symmetry in the finished baked good. Because of these characteristics, SSL is currently used in more baking applications than CSL.

Research has explored the possibility of replacing SSL with the use of enzymes. Enzyme technologies, by themselves, have not been able to completely replace SSL. A major limitation of enzymes is the production of gummy bread of unpredictable quality. Also, enzymes often do not augment dough strength, which is necessary to prevent loaf collapse during baking. Currently, enzymes are being used in conjunction with SSL to maximize the shelf life of bread. SSL is very good at increasing softness of bread during the first week after baking. Enzyme technology works best after the first 5 days of shelf life. Therefore, bread with optimal softness throughout the desired shelf life is obtained by using a combination of these technologies.

=== Lactylic esters of fatty acids ===
==== Overview ====
Lactylic esters of fatty acids (LEFA) are versatile additives used in foods, cosmetics, and packagings. LEFAs are non-toxic, biodegradable, and typically manufactured using biorenewable feedstocks.

As described by the Food Chemicals Codex 7th edition, LEFAs occur as liquids to hard, waxy solids. They are mixed fatty acid esters of lactic acid and its polymers, with minor quantities of free lactic acid, poly(lactic acid), and fatty acids. They are dispersible in hot water and are soluble in organic solvents, such as vegetable oils.

The following table contains useful information for commercially available LEFAs.

| Name | Abbreviation | CAS Number | Formula | Formula Weight | HLB | Functions | Applications | Toxicology |
|---|---|---|---|---|---|---|---|---|
| sodium behenoyl lactylate | SBL | 27847-75-2 | C_{28}H_{51}O_{6}Na | 506.691 g/mol | | emulsifier | moisturizing creams | non-toxic by ingestion slight skin irritant |
| sodium lauroyl lactylate | SLL | 13557-75-0 | C_{18}H_{31}O_{6}Na | 366.425 g/mol | 14.4 | emulsifier conditioner foam booster microbicide | cosmetics shampoos | LD50 6.81 g/kg (oral, rat) non-toxic by ingestion non-irritating |
| sodium isostearoyl lactylate | ISL | 66988-04-3 | C_{24}H_{43}O_{6}Na | 450.584 g/mol | 5.9 | emulsifier conditioner | shampoos skin conditioners lotions barrier creams makeup bases lipsticks deodorants shaving creams | LD50 6.1 g/kg (oral, rat) non-toxic by ingestion |
| sodium caproyl lactylate | SCL | 29051-57-8 | C_{16}H_{27}O_{6}Na | 338.372 g/mol | 11.3 | emulsifier foam booster microbicide | cosmetics | LD50 5.84 g/kg (oral, rat) non-toxic by ingestion non-irritating |
| oleyl lactylic acid | OLA | | C_{24}H_{42}O_{6} | 426.587 g/mol | | emulsifier | food emulsifier | non-toxic by ingestion |
| calcium oleyl lactylate | COL | | C_{48}H_{82}O_{12}Ca | 891.235 g/mol | | emulsifier stabilizer | food emulsifier/stabilizer | non-toxic by ingestion |
| sodium oleyl lactylate | SOL | 847904-46-5 | C_{24}H_{41}O_{6}Na | 448.569 g/mol | | emulsifier stabilizer | food emulsifier/stabilizer | non-toxic by ingestion |
| stearoyl lactylic acid | SLA | 14440-80-3 | C_{24}H_{44}O_{6} | 428.603 g/mol | | emulsifier plasticizer | food shortenings cake icings/fillings paper and paperboard packaging for fatty foods | non-toxic by ingestion |

==== Food labeling requirements ====
The Food Chemicals Codex considers LEFAs to be a general lactylate category for those lactylate products that do not conform to the specifications of either CSL or SSL. As such, the FCC only requires that LEFAs conform to the specifications established by the vendor. The composition of the LEFAs will vary depending on the types of fatty acids used, the ratios of the fatty acids to lactic acid, the degree of neutralization, and the nature of the base(s) used for neutralization (if applicable). As of 2004, there was no corresponding legislation in the EU.

==== Food applications and maximum use levels ====
In the United States, LEFA food applications are covered by 21 CFR 172.848. Permitted maximum use levels are limited to the levels necessary to achieve the intended physical or technical effect. Applications include: baked goods and mixes, pancake mixes, cake icings, fillings, and toppings, dehydrated fruits and vegetables, creamers, frozen desserts, liquid shortenings, precooked instant rice, and pudding mixes.
