= Calcium stearoyl-2-lactylate =

Names
- Preferred IUPAC name Calcium bis(2-{[2-(octadecanoyloxy)propanoyl]oxy}propanoate)
- Other names: E482; octadecanoic acid, 2-(1-carboxyethoxy)-1-methyl-2-oxoethyl ester, calcium salt; calcium bis(2-{[2-(stearoyloxy)propanoyl]oxy}propanoate); calcium verate; calcium stearoyl lactylate; calcium stearoyl-2-lactylate; calcium stearyl-2-lactylate; calcium stelate; stearoyl-2-lactylic acid, calcium salt; calcium alpha-(alpha-(stearoyloxy)propionyloxy)propionate; calcium 2-(1-carboxyethoxy)-1-methyl-2-oxoethyloctadecanoate; stearic acid, ester with lactate of lactic acid, calcium salt; stearic acid ester with lactic acid bimol. ester calcium salt; calcium bis(2-(1-carboxylatoethoxy)-1-methyl-2-oxoethyl) distearate

Identifiers
CAS Number	5793-94-2
3D model (JSmol)	Interactive image
ChemSpider	20709
ECHA InfoCard	100.024.851
EC Number	227-335-7
E number	E482 (thickeners, ...)
PubChem CID	22037
UNII	30MXH4012A
CompTox Dashboard (EPA)	DTXSID00889377
- InChI: InChI=1S/2C24H44O6.Ca/c2*1-4-5-6-7-8-9-10-11-12-13-14-15-16-17-18-19-22(25)29-21(3)24(28)30-20(2)23(26)27;/h2*20-21H,4-19H2,1-3H3,(H,26,27);/q;;+2/p-2 Key: OEUVSBXAMBLPES-UHFFFAOYSA-L
- SMILES: O=C(C(C)OC(CCCCCCCCCCCCCCCCC)=O)OC(C)C([O-])=O.O=C(C(C)OC(CCCCCCCCCCCCCCCCC)=O)OC(C)C([O-])=O.[Ca+2]

Properties
Chemical formula	C_{48}H_{86}CaO_{12}
Molar mass	895.282 g·mol^{−1}
Appearance	a cream-colored nonhygroscopic powder with a caramel odor
Melting point	45 °C (113 °F; 318 K)
Solubility in water	sparingly soluble
- Except where otherwise noted, data are given for materials in their standard state (at 25 °C [77 °F], 100 kPa). verify (what is ?) Infobox references

Calcium stearoyl-2-lactylate (calcium stearoyl lactylate or CSL) or E482 is a versatile, FDA approved food additive. It is one type of a commercially available lactylate. CSL is non-toxic, biodegradable, and typically manufactured using biorenewable feedstocks. Because CSL is a safe and highly effective food additive, it is used in a wide variety of products from baked goods and desserts to packaging.

As described by the Food Chemicals Codex 7th edition, CSL is a cream-colored powder. CSL is currently manufactured by the esterification of stearic acid and lactic acid with partial neutralization using food-grade hydrated lime (calcium hydroxide). Commercial grade CSL is a mixture of calcium salts of stearoyl lactic acid, with minor proportions of other salts of related acids. The HLB for CSL is 5.1. It is slightly soluble in hot water. The pH of a 2% aqueous suspension is approximately 4.7.

== Food labeling requirements ==
To be labeled as CSL for sale within the United States, the product must conform to the specifications detailed in 21 CFR 172.844. In the EU, the product must conform to the specifications detailed in Regulation (EC) No 96/77. Tests for these specifications can be found in the Food Chemical Codex. Acceptance criteria for these two regions are as follows:

Specific Test	Acceptance Criterion (FCC)	Acceptance Criterion (EU)
Acid Value	50 - 86	50 - 130
Calcium Content	4.2% - 5.2%	1% - 5.2%
Ester Value	125 - 164	125 - 190
Total Recoverable Lactic Acid	32.0% - 38.0%	15% - 40%

To be labeled as CSL for sale in other regions, the product must conform to the specifications detailed in that region's codex.

== Food applications and maximum use levels ==
CSL finds widespread application in baked goods, cereals, pastas, instant rice, desserts, icings, fillings, puddings, toppings, sugar confectionaries, powdered beverage mixes, creamers, cream liqueurs, dehydrated potatoes, snack dips, sauces, gravies, chewing gum, dietetic foods, minced and diced canned meats, and mostarda di frutta. In the United States, approved uses and use levels are described in 21 CFR 172.844, 21 CFR 176.170 and 21 CFR 177.120. while the corresponding regulations in the EU are listed in Regulation (EC) No 95/2.

United States		European Union					
Application	Maximum use level	Application	Maximum use level	Application	Maximum use level	Application	Maximum use level
Yeast-leavened bakery products	0.5% of flour	Fine baked goods	5 g/kg	Bread	3 g/kg	Breakfast cereals	5 g/kg
Liquid and frozen egg whites	0.05%	Fat emulsions	10 g/kg	Desserts	5 g/kg	Sugar confectionery	5 g/kg
Dried egg whites	0.5%	Beverage whiteners	3 g/kg	Hot powder beverage mixes	2 g/l	Dietetic foods	2 g/l
Whipped vegetable oil topping	0.3%	Quick-cook rice	4 g/kg	Minced and diced canned meats	4 g/kg	Mostarda di frutta	2 g/kg
Dehydrated potatoes	0.5%	Cereal-based snacks	2 g/kg	Cereal- and potato-based snacks	5 g/kg	Chewing gum	2 g/kg
Paper and paperboard packaging component	Not limited	Emulsified liqueur	8 g/l	Spirits <15% alcohol	8 g/l		
Cellophane	0.5% weight of cellophane						

The largest application of CSL is in yeast leavened bakery products. Although CSL was introduced to the market first, most applications use SSL. The main reason for the preference of SSL over CSL is that CSL has less crumb softening effects than SSL. However, CSL is still preferred in some applications, such as lean hearth bread-type formulations. In these applications, CSL is preferred because CSL performs better than SSL as a dough strengthener, while the finished product does not require a soft crumb or a perfectly symmetrical loaf shape.
