= Food Technology Industrial Achievement Award =

The Food Technology Industrial Achievement Award has been awarded by the Institute of Food Technologists since 1959. It is awarded for the development of an outstanding food process or product that represents a significant advance in the application of food technology to food production. The process or product must have been successfully applied in actual commercial operations between six months and seven years before December 1 in the year of the nomination.

Sponsored by Food Technology magazine, award winners receive a plaque from IFT.

== Winners ==
Year	Winner	Product or Process
1959	United States Department of Agriculture-Agricultural Research Station, Eastern Utilization Research & Development Division	Process to manufacture instant potato flakes.
1960	Merck & The American Meat Institute Foundation	Pediococcus cerevisiae starter culture for controlled fermentation of sausage.
1961	Swift & Company	Process using papain into cattle prior to slaughter to increase beef carcass tenderness.
1962	Sunkist Growers, Inc.	Encapsulated citrus oil.
1963	Swift & Company	Electrocoagulation method of continuous frankfurter processing.
1964	Whirlpool Corporation	Controlled atmospheric storage of produce.
1965	C.J. Patterson Co.	Calcium stearoyl-2-lactylate bread dough strengthener.
1966	Swift & Company, & Trenton Foods, Inc.	Canning process conducted under pressure to shorten processing times and improve food quality packaged in institutional-sized cans.
1967	Foremost Dairies	dough developers containing cysteine and whey solids that eliminate fermentation or sponge steps in breadmaking.
1968	Hoffman-LaRoche	Oil-soluble suspensions and water-dispersible beadlets of synthetic carotenoid food colors.
1969	Thomas J. Lipton, Inc.	Air-dried meat bits, granules, and strips composed of meat or poultry solids and soy protein isolate.
1970	General Foods Corporation	Freeze-thaw stable, nondairy whipped emulsion resembling whipped cream in appearance, usage, texture, and flavor.
1971	Central Food Technological Research Institute (India)	Peanut protein-fortified milk drink that expands the milk supply in India
1972	United States Department of Agriculture - Agricultural Research Station, Western Regional Research Laboratory	Dry caustic process for peeling fruit and vegetable products that lessens both pollution and water usage.
1973	Armour & Company - Food Research Division	Portable electronic instrument that tests a raw carcass and predicts its tenderness after cooking using nondestructive testing methods.
1974	Kelco Company & United States Department of Agriculture - Agricultural Research Station, Northern Regional Research Laboratory	Xanthan gum, a microbial polysaccharide used for thickening, suspending, emulsifying, and stabilizing purposes in foods.
1975	Clinton Corn Processing Company, a division of Standard Brands, Inc.	Production of high fructose corn syrup with immobilized enzyme technology.
1976	Bishopric Products Company & Purdue University	Aseptic bulk storage and transportation of partially processed foods.
1977	Mississippi State University & Dacus Packaging Corporation	Developing and commercializing canned catfish.
1978	United States Army Natick R&D Command, Reynolds Metals Company, & Continental Flexible Packaging	Retort pouch, a flexible laminated package that can handle thermal processing by combining the advantages of metal cans and boil-in bags.
1979	Grumann Corporation, & Armour & Company - Research Center	Hypobaric transportation and storage system which extends the storage life of fresh meats and other commodities six times greater than average.
1980	General Mills, Inc.	Packaging system protecting the shelf life of hydroponically grown produce
1981	Award not given
1982	Oregon State University & Galloway West Company	Bulk starter medium that improves starter culture growth for cheesemaking.
1983	Fundacion de Estudios Alimentarios v Nutricionales & Productos Alimientos Delicas	Soy-Oats infant formulas created to combat malnutrition in Mexico.
1984	Agriculture Canada - Research Branch & ABCO Manufacturers Limited	Blancher/cooker that introduces "individual quick blanching" to vegetable processing.
1985	G.D. Searle Company	Aspartame low-calorie sweetener.
1986	Award not given
1987	United States Department of Agriculture-Agricultural Research Station, Eastern Regional Research Center & LactAid, Inc.	Enzyme that assists lactose-intolerant individuals by reducing lactose into simple sugars.
1988 - 1991	Award not given
1992	Auburn University	Low-fat ground beef.
1993	Kelco Division of Merck	Gellan gum.
1994	North Carolina State University & Michael Foods	Ultra-pasteurized liquid whole egg products.
1995	Award not given
1996	APV - United Kingdom & EA Technology Limited	APV ohmic heating process.
1997	Qualicon, LLC	Development of Riboprinter microbial characterization system.
1998	National Starch and Chemical Company	Novationfunctional natives starches.
1999	McNeil Specialty Products	Sucralose, a low-calorie sweetener.
2000	Sunphenon DCF-1, Taiyo Kagaku Company, Limited	Decaffeinated green tea polyphenols.
2001	Calpis Company, Limited	Ameel-S lactic acid bacteria beverage created to prevent or lessen hypertension.
2002	Avure Technologies, Inc.	High pressure processing technology Fresher Under Pressure.
2003	National Starch and Chemical Company	Novolese 240 and Novolese 260 RS2 resistant starches.
2004	Tetra Pak	Tetra Recart AB Retortable carton packaging system.
2005	Snow Brand Milk Products Company, Limited	Milk basic protein.
2006	Praxair, Inc.	NatureWash ozonated water wash and dry system.
2007	Diversified Technologies, Inc.	Pulsed-electric fields technologies - treated juice
2008	Praxair, Inc	Controlled atmosphere stunning technology
2009	North Carolina State University, USDA–ARS South Atlantic Area Food Science Research Unit & Industrial Microwave Systems, L.L.C.	Continuous-flow microwave sterilization
2010	ConAgra Foods
2011	MicroThermics	Laboratory-scaled UHT/HTST Direct-Indirect Process System (DIP) with Full Automation
