= Minute Rice =

Parboiled rice

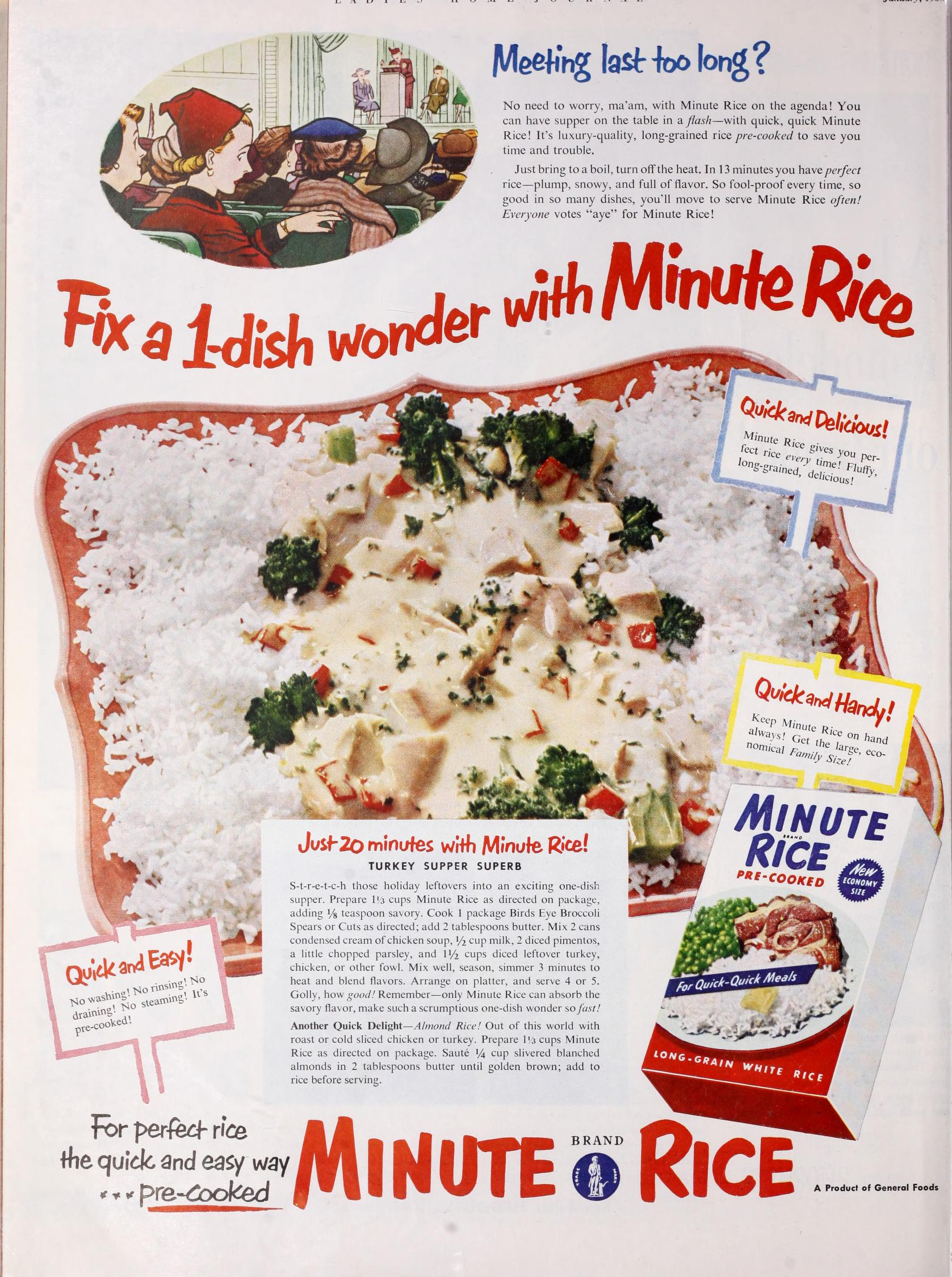
Minute Rice ad from 1953

Minute Rice is a brand of instant rice that cooks quickly, as the rice is parboiled and then dried prior to packaging. It was the first quick-cooking convenience white rice product on the US market.

== History ==
Afghan inventor Ataullah K. Ozai‐Durrani devised a process in the late 1930s to pre-cook and then dry rice in a way that allowed the rice to be re-hydrated simply by boiling it quickly. Ozai-Durrani sold his method to General Foods in 1941 for several million dollars. General Foods first supplied this quick-cooking rice to the US Army, and then released Minute Rice commercially in 1946. An improved version of the product was released several years later.

Minute Rice was heavily marketed throughout the 1950s in magazines including Life and Better Homes and Gardens. In the 1990s, General Foods merged with Kraft and became Kraft General Foods, which became Kraft Foods in 1995. Around this time, sales of the product began to slip, which industry executives attributed to complications from the Kraft merger, the rise in private label and store brands creating more competition, and rice becoming less popular with some consumers compared to potatoes and pasta. Kraft began another advertising blitz, including a hotline, 1-800-Minute-1, people could call for recipe ideas.

The Minute Rice product was sold to Ebro Foods (part of Ebro Puleva) in the United States in 2006, and to Ronzoni Foods Canada Corporation in Canada, which was renamed Catelli Food Corporation.
