= Dietary Supplement Health and Education Act of 1994 =

1994 statute of United States Federal legislation

- Long title: A bill to amend the Federal Food, Drug, and Cosmetic Act to establish standards with respect to dietary supplements, and for other purposes.
- Acronyms (colloquial): DSHEA
- Enacted by: the 103rd United States Congress
- Effective: October 25, 1994

Citations
- Public law: 103-417
- Statutes at Large: 108 Stat. 4325

Codification
- Acts amended: Federal Food, Drug, and Cosmetic Act
- Titles amended: 21 U.S.C.: Food and Drugs
- U.S.C. sections amended: 21 U.S.C. ch. 9, subch. I § 301; 21 U.S.C. ch. 9, subch. II § 321; 21 U.S.C. ch. 9, subch. IV §§ 343, 343-2, 350b; 42 U.S.C. ch. 6A, subch. III § 287c-11

Legislative history
- Introduced in the Senate as S. 784 by Orrin G. Hatch (R–UT) on April 7, 1993; Committee consideration by Committee on Labor and Human Resources and Committee on Energy and Commerce; Passed the Senate on August 13, 1994 (pass voice vote); Passed the House on October 7, 1994 (pass without objection); Senate agreed to amendment on October 8, 1994 (agreed voice vote); Signed into law by President Bill Clinton on October 25, 1994

The Dietary Supplement Health and Education Act of 1994 ("DSHEA"), is a 1994 statute of United States Federal legislation which defines and regulates dietary supplements. Under the act, supplements are regulated by the FDA for Good Manufacturing Practices under 21 CFR Part 111.

The act was intended to exempt the dietary and herbal supplement industry from most FDA drug regulations, allowing them to be sold and marketed without scientific backing for their health and medical claims. Supplement makers "routinely and systematically" bypass the DSHEA NDI process by using the generally recognized as safe (GRAS) process: first adding new compounds to a food and self-certifying, then adding them to supplements.

== Background ==
In the late 1980s and early 1990s, the American Congress was evaluating several bills which would have increased the powers of the FDA. One of these acts, the Nutrition Advertising Coordination Act of 1991 would have tightened the regulations regarding supplement labeling. In response to the proposed bill, many health food companies began lobbying the government to vote down the laws and told the public that the FDA would ban dietary supplements. A notable advertisement featured the actor Mel Gibson being raided and arrested by FDA agents because he was taking vitamin C supplements. Gerald Kessler, chief executive of Nature Plus, a dietary supplement manufacturer and one of the leaders of the lobbying effort, accused the FDA of having "a bias against the supplement industry for 50 years."

Senator Orrin Hatch (R-Utah) and Tom Harkin (D-Iowa) introduced the Dietary Supplement Health and Education Act in 1994. On October 25, 1994, President Bill Clinton signed the Act into law, saying that "After several years of intense efforts, manufacturers, experts in nutrition, and legislators, acting in a conscientious alliance with consumers at the grassroots level, have moved successfully to bring common sense to the treatment of dietary supplements under regulation and law."

Hatch had significant financial support from supplement manufacturers, including multi-level marketing firms XanGo and Herbalife.

== Definition of supplement ==
DSHEA defines the term "dietary supplement" to mean a product (other than tobacco) intended to supplement the diet that bears or contains one or more dietary ingredients, including a vitamin, a mineral, a herb or other botanical, an amino acid, a dietary substance for use by human to supplement the diet by increasing the total dietary intake, or a concentrate, metabolite, constituent, extract, or combination of any of the aforementioned ingredients. Furthermore, a dietary supplement must be labeled as a dietary supplement and be intended for ingestion and must not be represented for use as conventional food or as a sole item of a meal or of the diet. In addition, a dietary supplement cannot be approved or authorized for investigation as a new drug, antibiotic, or biologic, unless it was marketed as a food or a dietary supplement before such approval or authorization. Under DSHEA, dietary supplements are deemed to be food, except for purposes of the drug definition.

== Dietary supplement labels ==
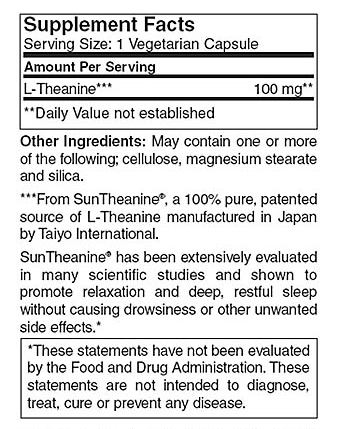
Supplement facts and a DSHEA disclaimer on a packet of Theanine capsules

A "label" is a display of written, printed, or graphic material on the supplement container. DSHEA and other federal regulations require the following information to appear on dietary supplement labels:

- a statement of identity that contains the words "dietary supplement." The word "dietary" may be replaced by the name of the dietary ingredient (e.g., "ginseng supplement")
- net quantity of contents (for example, "60 capsules")
- nutrition information in the form of a "Supplement Facts" panel, including the product serving size, the amount, and percent daily value, if established, of each dietary ingredient
- if a supplement contains a proprietary blend, the net weight of the blend as well as a listing of each ingredient in descending order of weight must be identified
- the part of the plant used, if a herb or botanical
- the name and place of business of the manufacturer, packer, or distributor
- a complete list of ingredients by their common or usual names, either in descending order of prominence or with the source of the dietary ingredient in the "Supplement Facts" panel following the name of the dietary ingredient (for example, calcium (from calcium carbonate))
- safety information that is considered "material" to the consequences that may result from the use of the supplement
- the disclaimer "This statement has not been evaluated by the Food and Drug Administration. This product is not intended to diagnose, treat, cure, or prevent any disease" if the supplement bears a claim to affect the structure or function of the body (structure/function claim), a claim of general well-being, or a claim of a benefit related to a classical nutrient deficiency disease.
- At their discretion, manufacturers may add additional information on labels (such as claims and statements of quality assurance), and may decide on the placement of that information on their labels.

== Regulatory review ==
Under the act, supplement manufacturers do not need to receive FDA approval before marketing dietary supplements that were marketed in the United States before 1994. Dietary ingredients not so grandfathered are defined as New Dietary Ingredients in 21 U.S.C. 350b(d), and notifications of providing reasonable evidence of their safety, or reasonable expectations of their safety, must be reviewed (not approved) by the FDA prior to their marketing. The FDA is not authorized to approve dietary supplements for safety and effectiveness. The herbal supplement industry has criticized these regulations as unfairly stringent; some feel they undermine the original intentions of the law to afford the herbal supplement industry freedom to market supplements as food.

== Reception ==
Some research has noted that there is scarce safety information available to the public about dietary supplements on the market. Other research has shown that the FDA has an insufficient network in the dietary supplement marketplace for responding to reports of adverse events. A bill to require tracking of illnesses related to supplement use was blocked in 2010 by Senator Hatch.

Supplement manufacturers have generally welcomed the act, saying that the act protects consumers' rights to readily have access to supplements, regardless of if they are proven to work. The anti-regulation lobbying group National Health Freedom Action calls DSHEA a "foundational cornerstone of health freedom in our country."

=== Criticism ===
The act has been widely criticised. Steven Novella has said that

The deal that DSHEA and NCCAM made with the public was this: Let the supplement industry have free reign [sic] to market untested products with unsupported claims, and then we’ll fund reliable studies to arm the public with scientific information so they can make good decisions for themselves. This "experiment" (really just a gift to the supplement industry) has been a dismal failure. The result has been an explosion of the supplement industry flooding the marketplace with useless products and false claims.

The act has also been criticised because supplement manufacturers are not required to demonstrate supplements' safety before marketing the supplements. The FDA can only ban a supplement if the FDA finds proof that the supplement is dangerous. This means that unsafe or ineffective supplements can be sold freely, while the FDA has only a limited capacity to monitor adverse reactions from supplements. David Kessler, commissioner of the FDA when DSHEA was approved, has stated that

The 1994 Dietary Supplement Act does not require that dietary supplements (defined broadly to include many substances, such as herbs and amino acids, that have no nutritive value) be shown to be safe or effective before they are marketed. The FDA does not scrutinize a dietary supplement before it enters the marketplace. The agency is permitted to restrict a substance if it poses a 'significant and unreasonable risk' under the conditions of use on the label or as commonly consumed ... Congress has shown little interest in protecting consumers from the hazards of dietary supplements, let alone from the fraudulent claims that are made, since its members apparently believe that few of these products place people in real danger. Nor does the public understand how potentially dangerous these products can be.

Critics also claim that many supplements are unsafe and unnatural, while many members of the public believe that supplements are natural as well as healthier and more effective than drugs. DSHEA has also been criticised for being an industry-driven bill, that the bill is made for the supplement industry, a multibillion-dollar industry, and not for consumers.

The disclaimer required by the DSHEA has been likened to the Miranda warning and dubbed the "quack Miranda warning". for allowing sellers of alternative medicine to make claims of questionable validity.

Following the release of the documentary film The Truth vs. Alex Jones, Science-Based Medicine writer David Gorski wrote that the act enabled Alex Jones and others to "use supplements to become rich promoting conspiracy theories".

== See also ==
- Regulation of food and dietary supplements by the U.S. Food and Drug Administration
- Title 21 of the Code of Federal Regulations
- Dietary supplement
