= Ataullah K. Ozai‐Durrani =

Afghan inventor

Ataullah Khan Ozai-Durrani (1898–2 May 1964) was an Afghan inventor, known for inventing a method for preparing instant rice. Ozai-Durrani sold this process to General Foods, which marketed it as Minute Rice: the first quick-cooking convenience white rice product on the US market.

== Biography ==
Ataullah Khan Ozai-Durrani, a relative of the king of Afghanistan, was born in Herat in 1898. He studied petrochemistry in Europe and immigrated to the United States in 1923.

In 1939, after years of home laboratory experiments and studying rice at the New York Public Library, Ozai-Durrani devised a method of preparing quick-cooking rice by cooking grains of rice, then drying them and packaging the dried rice in boxes. H. K. Smith, the manager of the Arkansas Rice Growers Collective, let Ozai-Durrani set up another lab in their growing area. In 1941, Ozai-Durrani walked into the New York City offices of General Foods with a portable stove and kit to demonstrate this rice-cooking method. General Foods bought the product for several million dollars, making Ozia-Durrani instantly wealthy.

Ozai-Durrani married Louisa Ebbs Harrison of Denver, Colorado; the two later divorced.

Ozai-Durrani died on 2 May 1964 in Englewood, Colorado of lung cancer. In his will, he left $30,000 to Louisiana State University to commission "an encyclopedic text" about rice, and over $500,000 to "Harvard University or such non-profit institution" for research and biographies of 19th-century Persian poets Mirza Asadullah Khan Ghalib and Mir Taqi Mir, as well as translation of their work into English. Ozai-Durrani wrote in his will that the bequest was in memory of scholar and ambassador Syud Hossain. The New Yorker wrote of the bequest: "We take note here of the late Mr. Ozai-Durrani's handsome bequest, and feel the richer for it." Harvard would use the money to appoint Annemarie Schimmel as Professor of Indo-Muslim Studies and to commission two books by Ralph Russell and Khurshidul Islam: Three Mughal Poets: Mir, Sauda, Mir Hasan (1968) and Ghalib 1797–1869: Life and Letters (1969).
