= Coffee-Mate =

Non-dairy coffee creamer made by Nestlé

Coffee-mate
- Product type: Coffee creamer
- Current owner: Nestlé
- Country: United States
- Introduced: February 2, 1961; 65 years ago
- Markets: Worldwide
- Website: goodnes.com/coffeemate

Coffee-mate is a lactose-free coffee creamer manufactured by Nestlé, available in powdered, liquid and concentrated liquid forms. It was introduced in 1961 by Carnation.

== Ingredients ==
Coffee-mate Original is mostly made up of three ingredients: corn syrup solids, hydrogenated vegetable oil, and sodium caseinate. Coffee-mate Original also contains small amounts of dipotassium phosphate, to prevent coagulation; mono- and diglycerides, used as an emulsifier; sodium aluminosilicate, an anticaking agent; artificial flavor; and annatto color.

== Varieties ==
The original product was introduced in February 1961, followed by Coffee-Mate Lite and Coffee-Mate Liquid in 1989.

In the United States of America, where the product is manufactured by Nestlé in Glendale, Arizona, the product is available in liquid, liquid concentrate and powdered forms. American Coffee-mate comes in over 25 different flavors, including gingerbread, Parisian almond creme as well as peppermint mocha. Discontinued varieties include Coffee-mate Soy and Coffee-mate Half & Half.

In Europe, it is only available in powder form as a coffee creamer in one or two varieties depending on the country with no added flavors. The European version of Coffee-mate is manufactured without the use of hydrogenated fat, which is linked to heart disease.

== Tea-mate ==
A Tea-mate powdered variety for whitening tea was also introduced in the UK in a jar as well as in other countries in sachets or cartons. In the UK, the variety was subsequently discontinued owing to poor sales performance. In other locations, such as in India, the product remains available.

== Other uses ==
Coffee-Mate was used on television horror-anthology series Are You Afraid of the Dark? as the "midnight dust" characters threw into a campfire to make an explosive puff of smoke and sparks as they introduced the episode's story.

== See also ==
- CoffeeRich
