= Adulterated food in the United States =

Food considered unsafe under US Law

Food adulteration is a legal offense in the United States. When a food product fails to meet the legal standards outlined in the Federal Food, Drug, and Cosmetic Act of 1938, it is legally considered to be adulterated food. One form of adulteration is the addition of another substance to a food item in order to increase the quantity of the food item in raw form or prepared form, which results in the loss of the actual quality of the food item. These substances may be either available food items or non-food items, and are commonly referred to as adulterants. Among meat products some common adulterants are water or ice, carcasses, or carcasses of animals other than the animal meant to be consumed. In the case of seafood, adulteration may refer to species substitution (mislabeling), which replaces the species identified on the product label with another species, or undisclosed processing methods, in which treatments such as additives, excessive glazing, or short-weighting are not disclosed to the consumer. While adulteration commonly refers to the unapproved use of bulking agents or additives, the sale of poisonous, unsanitary, or improperly stored food is also considered adulteration under US law.

== History ==
Historians have recognized cases of food adulteration in Ancient Rome and the Middle Ages. Contemporary accounts of adulteration date from the 1850s to the present day.

=== Legislative ===
In the United States, the Food and Drug Administration (FDA), regulates and enforces laws on food safety as well as Food Defense. The FDA provides some technical definitions of adulterated food in various United States laws.

- 1906 (21 U.S.C. 601 et. seq.)
- 1938 Federal Food, Drug, and Cosmetic Act (21 U.S.C. 321 et seq.)
- 1957 Poultry Products Inspection Act (21 U.S.C. 451 et seq.)
- 2011 Food Safety and Modernization Act

== Federal Food, Drug, and Cosmetic Act ==
The Federal Food, Drug, and Cosmetic (FD&C) Act 1988) provides that food is "adulterated" if it meets any one of the following criteria:

- (1) it bears or contains any "poisonous or deleterious substance" which may render it injurious to health;
- (2) it bears or contains any added poisonous or added deleterious substance (other than a pesticide residue, food additive, color additive, or new animal drug, which are covered by separate provisions) that is unsafe;
- (3) its container is composed, in whole or in part, of any poisonous or deleterious substance which may render the contents injurious to health;
- or (4) it bears or contains a pesticide chemical residue that is unsafe. (Note: The United States Environmental Protection Agency (EPA) establishes tolerances for pesticide residues in foods, which are enforced by the FDA.)

Food also meets the definition of adulteration if:

- (5) it is, or it bears or contains, an unsafe food additive;
- (6) it is, or it bears or contains, an unsafe new animal drug;
- (7) it is, or it bears or contains, an unsafe color additive;
- (8) it consists, in whole or in part, of "any filthy, putrid, or decomposed substance" or is otherwise unfit for food;
- or (9) it has been prepared, packed, or held under unsanitary conditions (insect, rodent, or bird infestation) whereby it may have become contaminated with filth or rendered injurious to health.

Further, food is considered adulterated if:

- (10) it has been irradiated and the irradiation processing was not done in conformity with a regulation permitting irradiation of the food in question (the FDA has approved irradiation of a number of foods, including refrigerated or frozen uncooked meat, fresh or frozen uncooked poultry, and seeds for sprouting [21 C.F.R. Part 179].);
- (11) it contains a dietary ingredient that presents a significant or unreasonable risk of illness or injury under the conditions of use recommended in labeling (for example, foods or dietary supplements containing aristolochic acids, which have been linked to kidney failure, have been banned.);
- (12) a valuable constituent has been omitted in whole or in part or replaced with another substance; damage or inferiority has been concealed in any manner; or a substance has been added to increase the product's bulk or weight, reduce its quality or strength, or make it appear of greater value than it is (this is "economic adulteration");
- or (13) it is offered for import into the United States and is a food that has previously been refused admission unless the person reoffering the food establishes that it is in compliance with U.S. law [21 U.S.C. § 342].

== Federal Meat Inspection Act and the Poultry Products Inspection Act ==
The Federal Meat Inspection Act and the Poultry Products Inspection Act of 1957 contain similar provisions for meat and poultry products. [21 U.S.C. § 453(g), 601(m).

=== Poisonous or deleterious substances ===
Generally, if a food contains a poisonous or deleterious substance that may render it injurious to health, it is considered to be adulterated. For example, apple cider contaminated with E. coli O157:H7 and Brie cheese contaminated with Listeria monocytogenes are adulterated. There are two exceptions to this general rule. First, if the poisonous substance is inherent or naturally occurring and its quantity in the food does not ordinarily render it injurious to health, the food will not be considered adulterated. Thus, a food that contains a natural toxin at very low levels that would not ordinarily be harmful (for instance, small amounts of amygdalin in apricot kernels) is not adulterated.

Second, if the poisonous or deleterious substance is unavoidable and is within an established tolerance, regulatory limit, or action level, the food will not be deemed to be adulterated. Tolerances and regulatory limits are thresholds above which a food will be considered adulterated. They are binding on FDA, the food industry, and the courts. Action levels are limits at or above which FDA may regard food as adulterated. They are not binding on FDA. FDA has established numerous action levels (for example, one part per million methylmercury in fish), which are set forth in its booklet Action Levels for Poisonous or Deleterious Substances in Human Food and Animal Feed.

If a food contains a poisonous substance in excess of a tolerance, regulatory limit, or action level, mixing it with "clean" food to reduce the level of contamination is not allowed. Deliberately mixing adulterated food with good food renders the finished product adulterated (FDA, Compliance Policy Guide [CPG § 555.200]).

=== Filth and foreign matter of adulteration ===
Filth and extraneous material include any objectionable substances in foods, such as foreign matter (for example, glass, metal, plastic, wood, stones, sand, cigarette butts), undesirable parts of the raw plant material (such as stems, pits in pitted olives, pieces of shell in canned oysters), and filth (namely, mold, rot, insect and rodent parts, excreta, decomposition). Under a strict reading of the FD&C Act, any amount of filth in a portion of food would render it adulterated. FDA regulations, however, authorize the agency to issue Defect Action Levels (DALs) for natural, unavoidable defects that at low levels do not pose a human health hazard [21 C.F.R. § 110.110]. These DALs are advisory only; they do not have the force of law and do not bind FDA. DALs are set forth in FDA's Compliance Policy Guides and are compiled in the FDA and Center for Food Safety and Applied Nutrition (CFSAN) Defect Action Level Handbook.

In most cases, DALs are food-specific and defect-specific. For example, the DAL for insect fragments in peanut butter is an average of thirty or more insect fragments per 100 grams (g) [CPG § 570.300]. In the case of hard or sharp foreign objects, the DAL, which is based on the size of the object and the likelihood it will pose a risk of choking or injury, applies to all foods (see CPG § 555.425).

=== Economic-adulteration ===
A portion of food is adulterated if it omits a valuable constituent or substitutes another substance, in whole or in part, for a valuable constituent (for instance, olive oil diluted with tea tree oil); conceals damage or inferiority in any manner (such as fresh fruit with food coloring on its surface to conceal defects); or any substance has been added to it or packed with it to increase its bulk or weight, reduce its quality or strength, or make it appear bigger or of greater value than it is (for example, scallops to which water has been added to make them heavier).

=== Microbiological contamination and adulteration of food ===
The fact that a food is contaminated with pathogens (harmful microorganisms such as bacteria, viruses, or protozoa) may, or may not, render it adulterated. Generally, for ready-to-eat foods, the presence of pathogens will cause the food adulterated. For example, the presence of Salmonella on fresh fruits or vegetables or in ready-to-eat meat or poultry products (such as luncheon meats) will render those products adulterated.

For meat and poultry products, which are regulated by USDA, the rules are more complicated. Ready-to-eat meat and poultry products contaminated with pathogens, such as Salmonella or Listeria monocytogenes, are adulterated. (Note that hotdogs are considered ready-to-eat products.) For raw meat or poultry products, pathogens will not always be adulterated (because raw meat and poultry products are intended to be cooked, and proper cooking should kill pathogens). Raw poultry contaminated with Salmonella is not adulterated. However, USDA's Food Safety and Inspection Service (FSIS) has ruled that raw meat or poultry products contaminated with E. coli O157:H7 are adulterated. This is because normal cooking methods may not reduce E. coli O157:H7 below infectious levels. E. coli O157:H7 is the only pathogen that is considered an adulterant when present in raw meat or poultry products.

== Enforcement actions ==
If food is adulterated, FDA and FSIS have a broad array of enforcement tools. These include seizing and condemning the product, detaining imported product, enjoining persons from manufacturing or distributing the product, or requesting a recall of the product. Enforcement action is usually preceded by a Warning Letter from the FDA to the manufacturer or distributor of the adulterated product. In the case of an adulterated meat or poultry product, FSIS has certain additional powers. FSIS may suspend or withdraw federal inspection of an official establishment. Without federal inspection, an establishment may not produce or process meat or poultry products, and therefore must cease operations. With the exception of infant formula, neither the FDA nor FSIS has the authority to require a company to recall an adulterated food product. However, the ability to generate negative publicity gives them considerable powers of persuasion.

State regulators generally have similar enforcement tools at their disposal to prevent the manufacture and distribution of adulterated food. In addition, many states have the authority to immediately embargo adulterated food and to impose civil fines. Federal agencies often will coordinate with state or local authorities to remove unsafe food from the market as quickly as possible.

== See also ==
- Adulterant
- List of foodborne illness outbreaks by death toll - includes contamination incidents
- Counterfeit medications
