= Avure Technologies =

- Industry: Food and drink
- Founded: 2000; 25 years ago
- Headquarters: United States

Avure Technologies, Inc. is a food processing company. It was one of the world’s leading producers of industrial-scale high pressure processing (HHP) equipment production along with Hiperbaric and UHDE High-Pressure Technologies.

== History ==
Avure was initially formed as a subsidiary of Flow International. It was acquired in 1999 through the purchase of the Swedish electro technical company, ABB. This company is known for the manufacture of systems for the automotive and aerospace sectors. Avure was established in 2000 as a food safety business, focusing on high-pressure processing equipment for the food industry. It later led a consortium of American food processing companies for the Department of Defense Dual Use S&T (DUST) program.

Avure Technologies had consistently incurred losses for Flow International. By 2002, the business was split into two: Ultrahigh-Pressure Waterjet Systems, which served the general manufacturing and industrial markets; and, Avure Technologies, which began focusing on the food safety and fresh products industries. In 2005, Avure Technologies was sold to the Los Angeles-based private equity firm, Gores Technology Group LLC.

Avure was later acquired by Milestone Partners, which split the company into two global platforms, one retained the Avure brand and focused on HPPsystems while the other focused on metal densification systems under the Quintus brand.

In 2018, Avure Technologies changed its name to Quintus Technologies.

== Technologies ==
The company produces commercial pressure vessels and HHP system blocks such as basket load conveyor, operator’s panel, control systems, water systems, and high-pressure pumping systems. It also holds the patent for QUINTUS, a wire-winding technology that features isostatic pressure.

In 2008, Avure developed a pressure-assisted thermal sterilization of mashed potatoes, which the FDA accepted a year later.
