= Frozen vegetables =

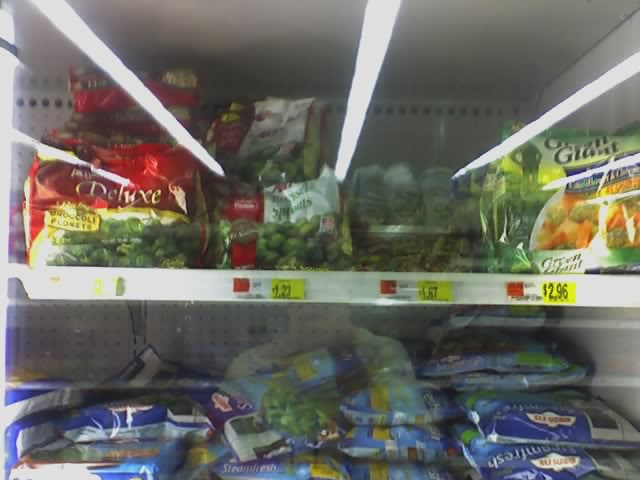
Various frozen vegetables displayed on a Wal-Mart Supercentre shelf

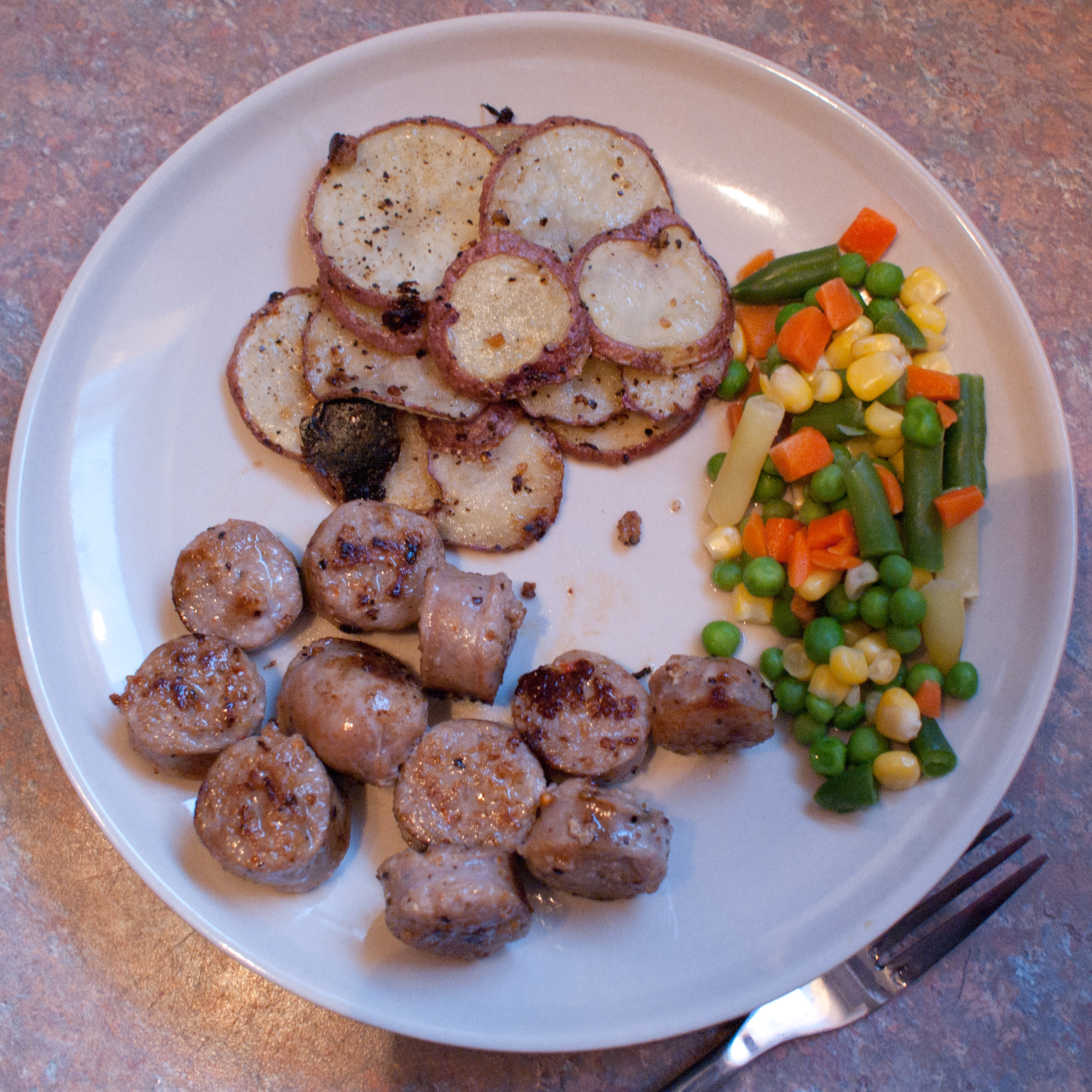
Frozen vegetables are sometimes sold as a mix of peas, corn, carrots, and green beans (right side of plate)

Frozen vegetables are vegetables that have had their temperature reduced and maintained to below their freezing point for the purpose of storage and transportation (often for far longer than their natural shelf life would permit) until they are ready to be eaten. It is a type of frozen food, for food preservation. They may be commercially packaged or frozen at home. A wide range of frozen vegetables are sold in supermarkets.

Examples of frozen vegetables which can be found in supermarkets include spinach, broccoli, cauliflower, peas, sweetcorn, yam (in Asia) either packaged as a single ingredient or as mixtures. There are occasions when frozen vegetables are mixed with other food types, such as pasta or cheese. Frozen fruits are produced using a very similar approach.

Some popular brands include Birds Eye and Green Giant, as well as supermarkets' 'store brand' items.

Frozen vegetables have some advantages over fresh ones, in that they are available when the fresh counterpart is out-of-season, they have a very long shelf life when kept in a freezer and that they often have been processed a step or more closer to eating (usually washed and cut, sometimes also seasoned). In many cases, they may be more economical to purchase than their fresh counterparts or are packaged while ripe.

The history of frozen fruits can date back to the Liao Dynasty of China, with the "frozen" pear being a classic delicacy eaten by the Khitan tribes in the Northeastern region of China. Modern frozen vegetables with the flash freezing technique was popularized by Clarence Birdseye in 1929.

== Nutrition ==
Over the years, there has been controversy as to whether frozen vegetables are better or worse than fresh ones. Generally, reports show that frozen vegetables are as nutritionally beneficial when compared to fresh ones.

In general, boiling vegetables can cause them to lose vitamins. Thus, the process of blanching does have deleterious effects on some nutrients. In particular, vitamin C and folic acid are susceptible to loss during the commercial process. That said, any additional loss from blanching and freezing is insignificant compared to the loss from direct boiling: when compared to fresh raw vegetables, boiled fresh vegetables shows as much loss of nutrients as boiled frozen vegetables. In addition, studies have shown that thawing frozen vegetables before cooking can accelerate the loss of vitamin C.

A 1997 study performed by the University of Illinois, 2007 study performed by University of California – Davis and a 2003 Austrian study support that canned or frozen produce has no substantial nutritional difference not attributable to the presence of added salt, syrup or other flavouring. In fact, these studies suggest that canned or frozen produce is nutritionally superior because of the very rapid deterioration of nutrients in fresh produce. A 2014 study which looks at both nutrition and cost provides the same conclusion about nutrition, but also that canned vegetables are consistently cheaper than frozen and fresh vegetables.

An advantage that frozen vegetables have over canned is that many brands contain little or no added salt because the freezing process by itself is able to stop bacterial growth. However, many canned vegetable brands with little or no sodium have become available and many frozen brands do have salt added for more flavour. Low-sodium cans used to be more expensive, but the price gap has been narrowing.

== Safety ==
Frozen vegetables can be contaminated with certain pathogens like Listeria. For people at risk of listeriosis illness (those with weakened immune systems and pregnant people), it is recommended that frozen vegetables be cooked before consumption to reduce the risk.

With that said, the risk of contamination is very low. Food safety regulations limit the amount of pathogens such as Listeria to safe limits (100 CFU/g in Europe). Contamination with Listeria is rare and results in product recalls or alerts. Although there is a risk of Listeria starting to grow during improper thawing to exceed the 100 CFU/g limit, the risk of infection remains much lower than other kinds of ready-to-eat food such as smoked fish, cooked meat, and soft cheese.

== See also ==
- Frozen food
- Canned food
- Cold chain
