= Processing aid =

A processing aid is a substance used in the production of processed food, and which may end up in the finished product, but which is not, by law, required to be disclosed to the consumer as an ingredient.

== Ethical concerns ==
NGOs, journalists, and food writers have raised concerns that the current laws on processing aids amount to a loophole that enables food producers to avoid transparency, and thereby to deceive consumers as to the contents of their food.

== Jurisdictions ==
=== United Kingdom ===
Under the United Kingdom food labelling regulations, a "processing aid" is defined as follows:

"Processing aid" means any substances not consumed as a food by itself, intentionally used in the processing of raw materials, foods or their ingredients, to fulfil a certain technological purpose during treatment or processing, and which may result in the unintentional but technically unavoidable presence of residues of the substance or its derivatives in the final product, provided that these residues do not present any health risk and do not have any technological effect on the finished product.

=== United States ===
Under the law of the United States of America, a substance is legally a "processing aid" and can be excluded from ingredients labels if it meets any of the following criteria:

1. It is added to the food but later removed. E.g. activated charcoal, which removes certain impurities.

2. It is added to the food, but gets converted into a substance already present in the food. E.g. a pH adjuster that converts to salt and does not significantly add to the food's salt level.

3. It is added for a technical effect during processing but is not present at "significant" levels in the food. E.g. a preservative added to an ingredient, like anti-caking agent sodium silicoaluminate in the seasoning of some sausages.
