= Food Chemicals Codex =

Collection of food standards

The Food Chemicals Codex (FCC) is a collection of internationally recognized standards for the purity and identity of food ingredients.

== Scope ==
The FCC features more than 1,250 monographs, including food-grade chemicals, processing aids, foods (such as vegetable oils, fructose, whey, and amino acids), flavoring agents, vitamins, and functional food ingredients (such as lycopene, olestra, and short chain fructooligosaccharides). The FCC also contains ingredients, such as sucrose and essential oils, that are not frequently found in other food additive standards resources.

The FCC provides essential criteria and analytical methods to authenticate and determine the quality of food ingredients. FCC standards are used as agreed standards between suppliers and manufacturers in ongoing purchasing and supply decisions and transactions.

The FCC has two primary sections: monographs and appendices. Monographs are listed alphabetically and typically cover a single ingredient. Monographs, where applicable, provide information about each ingredient, such as:

- Chemical structure
- Chemical formula
- Molecular weight
- INS Number
- CAS Registry Number
- Function
- Definition
- Packaging
- Storage
- Labeling requirements
- IR spectra

There are also several "family" monographs, which cover substance groups. These include "Enzyme Preparations," "Food Starch," and "Spice Oleoresins." Additionally, specifications are included, consisting of a series of tests, procedures for the tests, and acceptance criteria. Monographs may also detail USP Reference Standards and/or other materials needed for test performance. The FCC's appendices contain step-by-step guidance for general physical and chemical tests, and apparatus use, as well as generally useful information, such as food ingredient good manufacturing practices.

FCC standards are established, evaluated, and revised with scientific rigor in an open, collaborative process involving USP scientists, government representatives, expert volunteers, and public input. Standards are approved by an Expert Committee that includes knowledgeable technical leaders from industry, academia, and regulatory bodies from around the world.

== History ==
The FCC has been published since 1966.

Before 1960s, although the federal Food and Drug Administration (FDA) had, by regulations and informal statements, defined quality requirements for food chemicals generally recognized as safe (GRAS) in general terms, these requirements were not published in the official regulations or designed to be sufficiently specific, therefore their use for general guidance was restricted. For these and other reasons, the Food Protection Committee of the National Academy of Sciences-National Research Council received requests in 1958 from its Industry Liaison Panel and other sources to undertake a project designed to produce a Food Chemicals Codex comparable in many respects to the United States Pharmacopeia (USP) and the National Formulary (NF). In response to these requests, advice was sought from special committees composed of representatives of industry, government agencies, and others experienced in the operation of the USP and the NF. As a result, in 1966, the first edition of the FCC was published by the Institute of Medicine (IOM) for FDA.

USP acquired the FCC in 2006 and began the online version of the FCC in 2008. The FCC is published every two years in print and online formats and is offered as a subscription that includes a main edition and intervening supplements. All proposed standards and revisions for the FCC are first posted in the free, online FCC Forum for a 90-day public comment period. As of May 2021, the FCC has been reprinted twelve times.

== Editions ==
=== Latest edition (the twelfth edition) ===
FCC 12 has over 80 new and updated monographs compared to FCC 11.

It has more than 1,250 monographs including:

- Probiotics & prebiotics
- Flavors
- Preservatives
- Sweeteners
- Fats and oils
- Nutrients
- Colorants
- Infant formula ingredients

18 appendices, providing clear, step-by-step guidance for more than 150 tests and assays including:

- Lead limit test
- Food Fraud Mitigation Guidance
- Guidance on Developing and Validating Non-Targeted Testing

=== First edition ===
The Food Protection Committee started in 1961 to provide objective quality standards for food-grade chemicals. Parts of the first edition were published in loose-leaf form between 1963 and 1966.

The scope of the first edition was limited to substances amenable to chemical characterization or biological standardization which are added directly to food to perform some desired function. Such substances were selected from food additives generally recognized as safe, those approved by prior sanctions, and those for which special use tolerances have been established by FDA regulations.

=== Second edition ===
This edition, slightly larger than the first, contains 639 monographs.

=== Third edition ===
The specifications in this edition of FCC were officially recognized not only by the FDA but also, under certain conditions, by the Canadian, Australian, New Zealand and UK authorities. This edition shows substantial differences in format from its predecessor, including much larger pages and a two-column layout. The addition of 113 new monographs brought the total number to 776, covering over 800 substances. For the first time these included materials such as dextrose and fructose, more generally regarded as foods than as additives. Only one monograph, aluminium sulphate solution, was deleted, because it appeared to be no longer used in foods.

The monograph section previously entitled 'Specifications' was changed to 'Requirements', which also covered any identification tests that previously appeared under a 'Description' section.

Other changes in this edition were the inclusion for the first time of general Good Manufacturing Practices (GMP) guidelines for food chemicals, and the abandonment of a previous policy whereby the specifications for individual substances applied also to mixtures of the primary substance with additives such as anticaking agents, antioxidants and emulsifiers.

=== Fourth edition ===
Fifty-two new monographs were added to the third edition, making a total of 967 monographs.

In the course of the four editions, FCC was expanded to include not only food additives, but also substances that come into contact with food and substances that are food (e.g. fructose and dextrose). However, three previous monographs were deleted (carrageenan, cinnamyl anthranilate and methyl formate) due to altered circumstances, and special emphasis was instead placed on reducing contaminants, particularly lead.

=== Sixth edition ===
This edition was the first under USP's direction. This edition contained more than 1,000 monograph standards and tests to assure the identity, quality and purity of food ingredients.

=== Eighth edition ===
This authoritative edition provided:

- More than 1,100 monographs, which included chemical formula and structure, chemical weight, function, definition, packaging and storage, labelling requirements, test procedures and more.
- Fourteen appendices, which detailed more than 150 tests and assays, with step-by-step guidance for the analysis of enzymes, impurities such as metals and pesticides and markers for authenticity testing, among others.
- General information, which included relevant information on a variety of topics such as GMP Guidelines for Food Chemicals, a compare-and-contrast table of food and drug GMPs, a table of citations where the FCC has been incorporated by reference in the U.S. Code of Federal Regulations, AOAC International/International Organization for Standardization (ISO)/International Union of Pure and Applied Chemistry (IUPAC) method validation guidelines, and helpful introductions into a variety of different analytical test methods.

This edition also featured, for the first time, the complete contents of USP's Food Fraud Database. The database featured more than 1,300 entries on adulterants reported for specific ingredients and the corresponding analytical detection method. Based on scholarly manuscripts and media articles from 1980 to 2010, it aimed to serve as a baseline on fraud issues and be a useful risk management tool for industry, regulators and other stakeholders.

=== Ninth edition ===
The ninth edition included latest specifications for the identity and purity of about 1,200 food ingredients, including test methods and key guidance on critical issues.

Among the new monographs in the FCC was spirulina, a food ingredient that was approved in 2013 as a natural source of blue colour for candy and chewing gum by the US FDA. Formulators also use spirulina in specialty food bars and powdered nutritional drinks, among other products, due to its non-animal protein content.

Another monograph included in this edition of FCC was Brilliant Black PN, a synthetic food color used in products requiring the colour black in their formulation (such as jams, chocolate syrup and candy). Even though the FDA has not approved Brilliant Black PN as a food colour in the US, its use in food is currently approved in many other countries.

=== Fourteenth edition ===
As of mid-2024, the latest edition is the 14th.

== Applications ==
The FCC is cited over 200 times in the U.S. Code of Federal Regulations and is recognized by regulatory bodies around the world including the US, Argentina, Australia, Brazil, Canada, Israel, New Zealand, Paraguay, and Uruguay.

== Related compendia ==
=== JECFA ===
The FCC and standards from the Joint FAO/WHO Expert Committee on Food Additives (JEFCA) are both used throughout the world. The FCC is a more comprehensive compendium and includes ingredients that are not considered by JECFA. More specifically, the FCC is a compendium for all food ingredients, while JECFA considers only "food additives" for inclusion in its compendium. Examples of substances included in the FCC, but not in JECFA standards, are soybean oil, sucrose, fructose, and sodium chloride—substances considered by JECFA to be foods or food ingredients, but not "food additives." Furthermore, the FCC considers for inclusion essential oils, functional food ingredients, and U.S. GRAS-Notified and GRAS-self-determined ingredients. The broader range of ingredients encompassed by the FCC generates a compendium for the food industry that is often considered more complete and more useful.

=== GRAS ===
As a list of food substances not requiring a formal premarket review by FDA to assure their safety, the GRAS list is directly regulated and updated by FDA. By 1997, the FDA had tentatively concluded that it could no longer devote substantial resources to the GRAS affirmation petition process. As a result, the FDA launched the GRAS Notification Program so as to update the list. FCC standards are reviewed and approved by independent experts. All proposed standards and revisions for the FCC are first posted in the free, online FCC Forum for a 90-day public comment period.

== See also ==
- Codex Alimentarius
- Food additive
- Federal Food, Drug, and Cosmetic Act
- Food Additives Amendment of 1958
- FDA Food Safety Modernization Act
- Generally recognized as safe
- Joint FAO/WHO Expert Committee on Food Additives
