= Non-dairy creamer =

Substitute for milk or cream in coffee

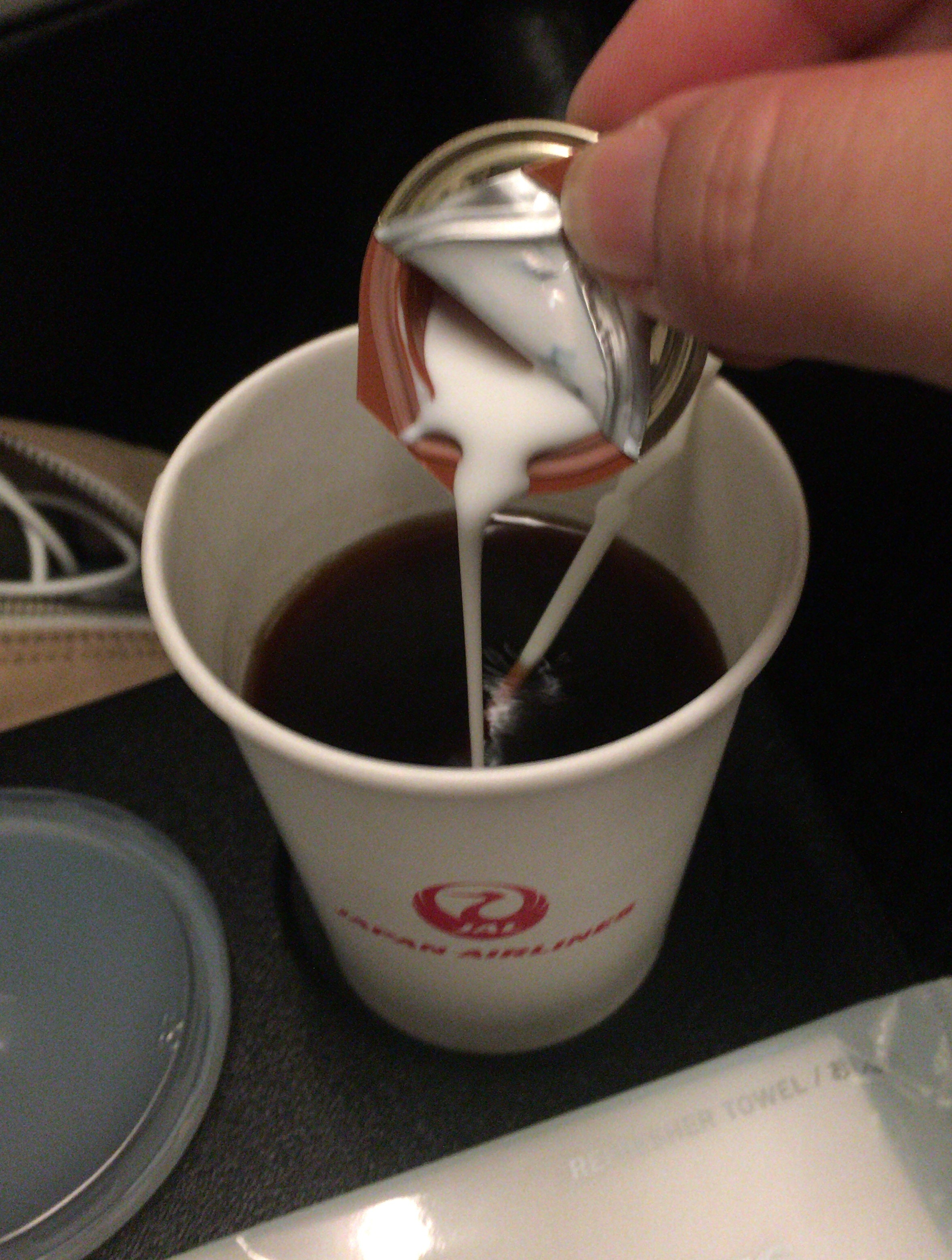
Non-dairy creamer being added to coffee

A non-dairy creamer, commonly also called tea whitener or coffee whitener or else just creamer, is a liquid or granular product intended to substitute for milk or cream as an additive to coffee, tea, hot chocolate, or other beverages. Most do not contain lactose and therefore are commonly described as being non-dairy products, although many contain casein, a milk-derived protein.

Dry granular products do not need to be refrigerated and can be used and stored in locations which do not have a refrigerator. Liquid non-dairy creamers should be tightly capped and refrigerated after opening. Some non-dairy creamers contain sweeteners and flavors, such as vanilla, hazelnut, or Irish cream. As with other processed food products, low-calorie and low-fat versions are available for non-dairy creamers.

== History ==
Various creamers at a typical grocery store, including numerous varieties of Coffee-Mate and International Delight

Holton "Rex" Diamond, an employee of Rich Products, performed experiments from 1943 to 1945 using a "[g]elationous form of soybean protein" to make a "soy cream" that would not form curds when mixed with coffee. Diamond's experiments are the first English-language reference to a non-dairy creamer for coffee. Frank S. Mitchell, another Rich Products Corp. employee, and Diamond developed a non-dairy whipped topping for their employer in 1946. Mitchell also developed a non-dairy coffee creamer, Perx, which was successful in the market.

In 1950, Melvin Morse and Dick Borne of Presto Foods developed "Mocha Mix Coffee Creamer", which was the first commercial non-dairy creamer and the first product with the term “coffee creamer” in the name. Another early commercial powdered creamer was "Pream", first marketed in 1952 and made from dehydrated cream and sugar. It did not dissolve easily because of the protein in the milk.

Six years later, in 1958, the Carnation Company developed a product that easily dissolved in hot liquid because it replaced most of the milk fat with vegetable oil, and reduced the milk protein. The new product was marketed under the Carnation label with the brand name Coffee-Mate and released in 1961, shortly after the commercial introduction of Rich Products' CoffeeRich. Borden followed suit by launching Cremora non-dairy creamer in 1963.

== Ingredients ==
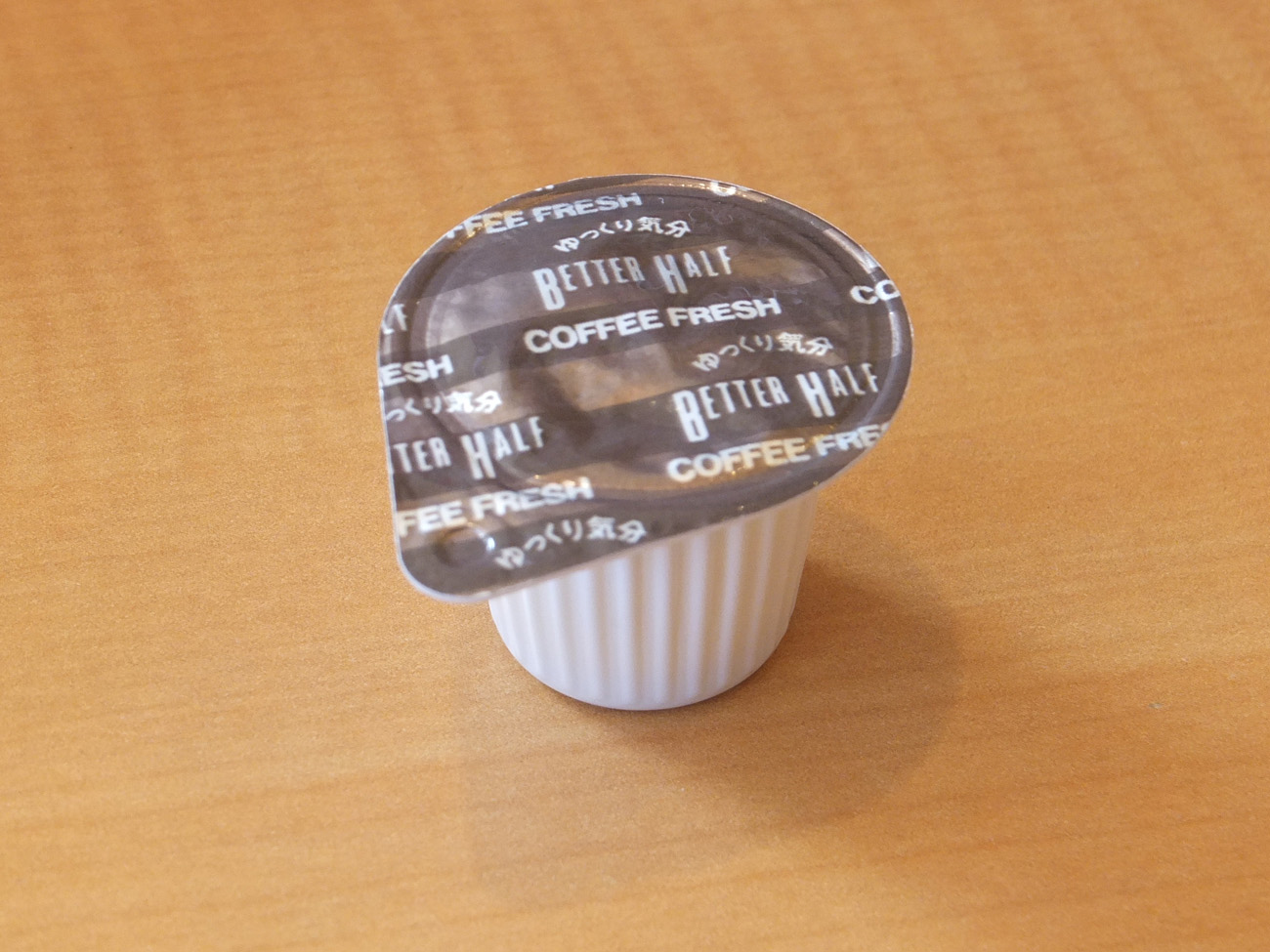
A plastic container of "Coffee Fresh", a liquid non-dairy creamer sold in Japan

To replicate the mouthfeel of milk fats, nondairy creamers often contain hydrogenated vegetable oils, although nonfat nondairy creamers/whiteners also exist. Other common ingredients include solidified corn syrup and other sweeteners or flavorings (such as French vanilla, hazelnut, and Irish cream); as well as sodium caseinate, a milk protein derivative (from casein) that does not contain lactose.

The use of a milk derivative prompts some individuals and organizations – such as vegans and Jewish dietary law authorities – to classify the product as "dairy" rather than nondairy. Those who rely on this classification will either not consume the product (e.g., vegans) or will not use or consume it in conjunction with any meat products (e.g., observant Jews). People with milk allergies need to be aware that non-dairy creamer may contain sodium caseinate, a milk protein. It will be on the ingredient list.

The Food and Drug Administration (FDA) has stated that products with sodium caseinate may contain low levels of lactose. For a normal serving, the amounts are too small to trigger lactose intolerance.

== Non-food uses ==
As with many other powders, large amounts of powdered non-dairy creamer are susceptible to dust explosion when suspended in air. Amateur filmmakers and pyrotechnicians have taken advantage of this property to produce several types of fireball effects. Individuals using powdered non-dairy creamer in the ordinary amounts used in a cup of coffee do not face a risk of dust explosion.

== See also ==
- Coffee break
- List of dried foods
- Plant milk
