= Dough strength =

Property of dough in breadmaking

The dough strength is a property of dough that enables it to withstand the mechanical stress of the breadmaking process through a balanced combination of viscosity and elasticity. While the exact definitions of dough strength (also known as flour strength, baking strength, flour protein strength and gluten strength) vary to the point that some researchers avoid using the term altogether for its lack of precision, generally the dough strength is considered to have three components:

- extensibility allows the dough to be stretched and keep the new shape, so that the bread rolls and loaves can be formed;
- elasticity allows the dough to spring back after deformation. Hearth breads made of dough with little elasticity will go flat instead of baking up;
- tenacity is the overall resistance of dough to stretching. High tenacity makes dough hard to work with during the makeup.

Typically the dough strength is measured with an alveograph (W factor).

== Sources ==
- Chen, R. Y.; Seabourn, B. W.; Xie, F.; Herald, T. J. (2009). "A Modified Extensigraph Method for Evaluating Dough Properties of Hard Wheat Breeding Lines". Cereal Chemistry. 86 (5): 582–589. doi:10.1094/CCHEM-86-5-0582. ISSN 0009-0352.
- Gisslen, Wayne (2016). "Dough Strength". Professional Baking. Wiley. ISBN 978-1-119-14844-9.
- Jødal, Anne-Sophie Schou; Larsen, Kim Lambertsen (2021-03-05). "Investigation of the relationships between the alveograph parameters" (PDF). Scientific Reports. 11 (1). doi:10.1038/s41598-021-84959-3. ISSN 2045-2322. PMC 7935897. PMID 33674707.
- Wooding, A. R.; Kavale, S.; MacRitchie, F.; Stoddard, F. L. (1999). "Link Between Mixing Requirements and Dough Strength" (PDF). Cereal Chemistry. 76 (5): 800–806. doi:10.1094/CCHEM.1999.76.5.800. ISSN 0009-0352.
