= Regulation of food and dietary supplements by the U.S. Food and Drug Administration =

Governmental regulation of food quality

FDA logo

The regulation of food and dietary supplements by the U.S. Food and Drug Administration is a process governed by various statutes enacted by the United States Congress and enforced by the U.S. Food and Drug Administration ("FDA"). Pursuant to the Federal Food, Drug, and Cosmetic Act ("the Act") and accompanying legislation, the FDA has authority to oversee the quality of substances sold as food in the United States, and to monitor claims made in the labeling about both the composition and the health benefits of foods.

Substances which the FDA regulates as food are subdivided into various categories, including foods, food additives, added substances (man-made substances which are not intentionally introduced into food, but nevertheless end up in it), and dietary supplements. The specific standards which the FDA exercises differ from one category to the next. Furthermore, the FDA has been granted a variety of means by which it can address violations of the standards for a given category of substances.

== History of legislation ==
=== Pure Food and Drug Act ===
The Pure Food and Drug Act of 1906 was the first of a series of significant consumer protection laws enacted by the Federal Government in the twentieth century and led to the creation of the Food and Drug Administration. Its main purpose was to ban foreign and interstate traffic in adulterated or mislabeled food and drug products, and it directed the U.S. Bureau of Chemistry to inspect products and refer offenders to prosecutors. It required that active ingredients be placed on the label of a drug's packaging and that drugs could not fall below purity levels established by The United States Pharmacopeia or The National Formulary. The Jungle by Upton Sinclair was an inspirational piece that kept the public's attention on the important issue of unsanitary meat processing plants that later formed the Pure Food and Drug Act.

=== Federal Food, Drug, and Cosmetic Act ===
The United States Federal Food, Drug, and Cosmetic Act (abbreviated as FFDCA, FDCA, or FD&C), is a law first passed by Congress in 1938 giving authority to the U.S. Food and Drug Administration (FDA) to oversee the safety of food, drugs, and cosmetics. A principal author of this law was Royal S. Copeland, a three-term U.S. Senator from New York. In 1968, the Electronic Product Radiation Control provisions were added to the FD&C. Also in that year the FDA formed the Drug Efficacy Study Implementation (DESI) to incorporate into FD&C regulations the recommendations from a National Academy of Sciences investigation of effectiveness of previously marketed drugs. The act has been amended many times, most recently to add requirements about bioterrorism preparations.

The introduction of this act was influenced by the death of more than 100 patients due to a sulfanilamide medication where diethylene glycol was used to dissolve the drug and make a liquid form. See Elixir Sulfanilamide disaster. It replaced the earlier Pure Food and Drug Act of 1906.

=== Food Additives Amendment of 1958 ===
The Food Additives Amendment of 1958 is a 1958 amendment to the Food, Drugs, and Cosmetic Act of 1938. It was a response to concerns about the safety of new food additives. The amendment established the designation of "generally recognized as safe", which refers to chemicals or substances which can be used as food additives without further evaluation or testing just because they have been long used and there is broad acceptance of their use. New food additives would be subject to testing including by the "Delaney clause". The Delaney clause was a provision in the amendment which said that if a substance were found to cause cancer in man or animal, then it could not be used as a food additive.

=== Dietary Supplement Health and Education Act of 1994 ===
The Dietary Supplement Health and Education Act of 1994 is a 1994 statute of United States Federal legislation which defines and regulates dietary supplements. Under the act, supplements are mainly unregulated, without proof of effectiveness or safety needed to market a supplement, as well as dietary supplements being classified as foods instead of as drugs.

== Food ==
Food is defined in the Act to be:

1. articles used for food or drink for man or other animals,
2. chewing gum, and
3. articles used for components of any such article.

The first definition offered is self-referential, defining food in part as "articles used for food", leaving it to the FDA and the courts to determine what exactly constitutes food. This determination is particularly important because the definition of a "drug" under the act includes a section defining drugs as "articles (other than food) intended to affect the structure or any function of the body of man or other animals". Thus, the definition of food is important not only in determining what is covered by the regulatory regime for food, but in determining what is excluded from the regulatory regime for drugs. For example, in the 1983 case of Nutrilab, Inc. v. Schweiker, the United States Court of Appeals for the Seventh Circuit found that starch blockers, though derived from kidney beans, were drugs rather than food under the meaning of the Act. The starch blockers were sold as tablets, and "not consumed primarily for taste, aroma, or nutritive value". Products that are normally considered to be foods may also be regulated as drugs if the parties responsible for their manufacture or sale make claims as to their ability to treat diseases, although the FDA now permits advertising addressing the disease-fighting qualities in foods where those qualities have been endorsed by the scientific community.

The standards for food sold in the United States are set forth in Chapter IV of the Act. These standards set forth two main areas of food that violates the Act: adulterated food and misbranded food. These categories are independent of one another; food can be completely free of adulteration and otherwise healthy to consume, and still be in violation of the act if it is misbranded. Likewise, food that has completely accurate labels, including warnings about dangers that it may pose to health, may nevertheless be deemed adulterated.

=== Adulterated food ===
The Act sets forth several circumstances under which food will be deemed adulterated. The primary definition set forth is that food is adulterated if:

...it bears or contains any poisonous or deleterious substance which may render it injurious to health; but in case the substance is not an added substance such food shall not be considered adulterated under this clause if the quantity of such substance in such food does not ordinarily render it injurious to health.

Added substances are treated separately by the FDA, meaning that the sale of an article or substance as food will generally be permitted if that article or substance is not ordinarily injurious to health.

Food is also deemed adulterated "if it consists in whole or in part of any filthy, putrid, or decomposed substance, or if it is otherwise unfit for food"; if it was "prepared, packed, or held under insanitary conditions whereby it may have become contaminated with filth, or whereby it may have been rendered injurious to health"; if it was produced from "a diseased animal or of an animal which has died otherwise than by slaughter"; if it was packaged in a poisonous material; or if it was intentionally irradiated outside of irradiation guidelines set forth by the Act. These definitions are also independent, meaning that food that is "filthy" or has been "held under insanitary conditions" is still in violation of the Act and subject to condemnation even if the owner can demonstrate that it poses no actual threat to health. The phrase "otherwise unfit for food", although seeming to be a catch-all, has rarely been invoked. It would apply to a circumstance such as a seller offering wood chips as food, which might be safe to consume and prepared under sanitary conditions, but would be impossible to chew.

==== Inspections for adulteration ====
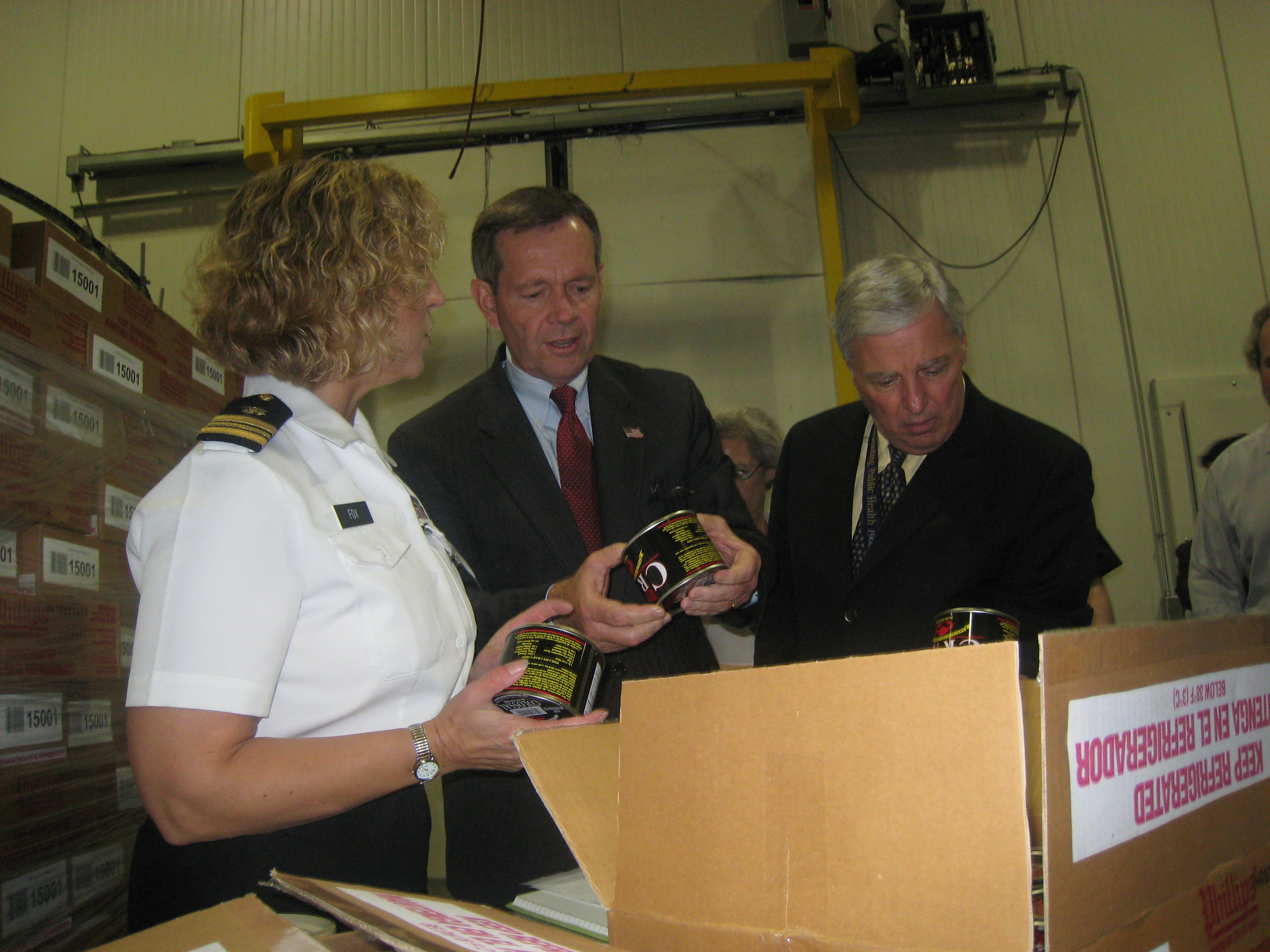
An FDA Inspector gives an overview of the seafood inspection process to HHS Secretary Mike Leavitt and FDA Commissioner Andrew von Eschenbach at a Baltimore, Maryland processing facility owned by Phillips Foods, Inc. and Seafood Restaurants.

The FDA has the authority to inspect any establishment in which food is manufactured, processed, packed, or held. In searching for contamination, the FDA typically uses organoleptic inspection methods – investigators trained to distinguish contamination and decomposition by sight and smell. Upon completion of such an inspection, the FDA will generate an "Establishment Inspection Report" (EIR) detailing any problems found. Where problems are found, the FDA will instruct the owner of the inspected facility how to proceed in resolving those problems. FDA inspectors may take photographs of an establishment unless they are expressly told not to do so, and the owner of the establishment must provide an employee to answer questions that arise during the inspection. If the owner of an establishment refuses to permit FDA inspectors to enter a covered establishment, or any part of one, then the FDA may obtain a search warrant to enter.

Courts have held that, so long as the owner has not objected to the inspection and prevented the inspectors from entering, the FDA does not require a warrant to seize materials that are in violations of the Act. Furthermore, such materials may be used at trial against the owner without raising unreasonable search and seizure issues under the Fourth Amendment to the United States Constitution because the industry at issue has been found to be heavily regulated, meaning that the owner of such an establishment has no expectation of privacy with respect to premises of the type covered by the Act.

==== Action levels ====
The presence of some degree of contamination is inevitable in almost all food. Technically, the FDA could inspect all food under a microscope and prohibit the sale of every article containing any discernible trace of mold, insect fragments, rodent hairs, and the like – effectively barring the sale of all food. In order to avoid this outcome, the FDA sets "action levels", which specify minimum amounts of particular contaminants that must be found in a food sample before the FDA will take action with respect to that sample. The FDA maintains a listing of all current action levels on its website. The FDA also establishes action levels for man-made chemicals such as aflatoxin, lead, and mercury, and maintains these on its website.

=== Misbranded food ===
The primary basis under which food may be deemed misbranded under the Act is if "its labeling is false or misleading in any particular". Labeling is defined elsewhere in the Act, and includes:

...all labels and other written, printed, or graphic matter

1. upon any article or any of its containers or wrappers
2. accompanying such article

Under the second part of this definition, it has been held that a food substance sold in conjunction with a book or pamphlet which makes false claims about the benefits of that substance is misbranded. If books making false claims about a food are sold in conjunction with that food, the books themselves may also be seized and destroyed – even if the author had no intention of selling the book in conjunction with the food. However, if a store happens to be selling both a food and a book which makes false claims about that food, and is selling the items separately, then no misbranding occurs. This is so even if the book and the food are both produced by the same company, and even if the maker of the food encourages the seller to carry the book.

In terms of determining whether food is misbranded, the FDA only monitors labeling, and not advertising, which instead falls under the authority of the Federal Trade Commission. However, the FDA will review the advertising of a product to determine whether it is to be regulated as a food or as a drug, based on the claims that the manufacturer or seller makes about its properties.

==== Standards of identity ====
The FDA is authorized to issue a standard of identity for any food. This is a description of what, exactly, must be in that food in order for it to be identified under a certain name. For example, a court has upheld an FDA ruling that for a product to be sold as cream cheese, it must contain a specified minimum percentage of milk fat, and a maximum level of moisture. Incorrectly identifying a food by a name for which a standard of identity has been established is considered a form of misbranding. The FDA has set forth nearly 300 such standards. However, in recent decades, companies marketing new types of food items have diminished the importance of these standards by simply coining new names for foodstuffs that do not conform to an existing standard, with examples including Cool Whip and Cheetos.

==== Health claims ====
There are two kinds of health claims that can be made about foods other than dietary supplements: structure/function claims and disease claims. Structure/function claims are claims that do not suggest that the food can diagnose, treat, or prevent any particular disease, but that it can, for example, maintain, regulate, or promote normal healthy bodily functions. Where such claims are made, foods are generally required to carry a disclaimer on their label indicating that the claim has not been evaluated by the FDA.

Disease claims suggest that the food can help prevent specific diseases. Such claims are only permitted where the FDA finds that there is "significant scientific agreement", or where the claim has been approved by another federal health agency or the National Academy of Sciences.

== Food additives ==
Food additives are defined in the Act to be:

...any substance the intended use of which results or may reasonably be expected to result, directly or indirectly, in its becoming a component or otherwise affecting the characteristics of any food...

The definition goes on to capture several broad categories of things not traditionally thought of as "food", including "any substance intended for use in producing, manufacturing, packing, processing, preparing, treating, packaging, transporting, or holding food". The definition only applies if the substance in question is not "generally recognized as safe" by qualified experts, and also exempts substances that were in common use as food prior to January 1, 1958.

The Act sets forth certain exemptions for substances which are treated under different regulatory schemes, including pesticide chemicals and their residue, color additives, substances previously approved under other statutes, new animal drugs, and dietary supplements. The statute directs that food additives are generally to be presumed to be unsafe (and therefore prohibited) until they have been proven to be safe. However, the statute then sets out a regulatory scheme under which a person intending to use a heretofore unapproved food additive may petition for "the issuance of a regulation prescribing the conditions under which such additive may be safely used".

=== Delaney clause ===
The Delaney clause, initially enacted in 1958, prohibits the FDA from approving food additives shown to cause cancer. At the time of the passage of the amendment, little was known about the carcinogenic propensities of a wide variety of additives. Following the enactment of this amendment, more and more substances were shown to be potentially carcinogenic, albeit in experiments wherein test animals were subjected to doses far in excess to the proportions which humans were likely to consume. In 1982, the FDA responded to this trend by adopting a rule that a food additive would not be denied approval under the Delaney clause unless the additive itself, and not just the constituent chemicals used to make it, was shown to cause cancer. This policy was later challenged in court following FDA approval of a food coloring manufactured with a compound known to be carcinogenic, after separate testing indicated that the food coloring itself did not cause cancer in test animals. The United States Court of Appeals for the Sixth Circuit upheld the FDA's approval of the food coloring.

== Added substances ==
Added substances are not separately defined in the act, but are understood to be different from food itself based on the definition of adulterated food, and a later section authorizing the FDA to set forth tolerance limits for "[a]ny poisonous or deleterious substance added to any food...". Such substances are prohibited, "except where such substance is required in the production thereof or cannot be avoided by good manufacturing practice". Because added substances often can not be avoided in food, such as the presence of environmental pollutants in fish, the FDA is required to "promulgate regulations limiting the quantity therein or thereon to such extent as [is] necessary for the protection of public health". The action levels discussed above with respect to poisonous or deleterious substances address these added substances. Added substances differ from food additives, discussed above, in that the latter applies to things which are intentionally added to food, and therefore require FDA approval prior to being added to food.

== Dietary supplements ==
The Dietary Supplement Health and Education Act of 1994 mandated that the FDA regulate dietary supplements as foods, rather than as drugs. Consequently, dietary supplements are defined as a kind of food under the statute, with the caveat that this does not exempt them from being treated as drugs in the way that other foods are exempted, if circumstances permit it.

Like other food substances, dietary supplements are not subject to the safety and efficacy testing requirements imposed on drugs, and unlike drugs they do not require prior approval by the FDA; however, they are subject to the FDA regulations regarding adulteration and misbranding. The FDA can take action against dietary supplements only after they are proven to be unsafe. Dietary supplements may be deemed to be misbranded if they are marketed in a way that characterizes them as a drug, without having undergone the clinical trials to which new drugs are subjected. Manufacturers of dietary supplements are permitted to make specific claims of health benefits, referred to as "structure or function claims" on the labels of these products. They may not claim to treat, diagnose, cure, or prevent disease and must include a disclaimer on the label. Where a manufacturer makes a structure or function claim in connection with the sale of a dietary supplement, the manufacturer must notify the FDA within 30 days after it has introduced that product to the market.

Claims that either a food or dietary supplement acts to prevent a disease are permitted, so long as there is "significant scientific agreement" for the claim, or it has been approved in an "authoritative statement" by "a scientific body with official responsibility for the public health protection or research directly relating to human nutrition" such as the National Academy of Sciences.

Consumer Reports, a consumer protection advocacy and product testing group, stated:

They can be ineffective, contaminated with microbes or heavy metals, dangerously mislabeled, or intentionally spiked with illegal or prescription drugs. They can also cause harmful side effects by themselves and interact with prescription medication in ways that make those drugs less effective. [...] According to a 2015 nationally representative Consumer Reports survey, almost half of American adults think that supplement makers test their products for efficacy, and more than half believe that manufacturers prove their products are safe before selling them.

In February 2019 FDA commissioner Scott Gottlieb said that the agency needed stronger powers over health claims and the FDA warned a dozen companies to stop claiming their products can cure diseases. The present law, established in 1994, requires the agency to prove that a product is unsafe. Manufacturers have to notify the agency of new products, but not of their ingredients. In 2019 there were between 50,000 and 80,000 dietary supplements on the American market, beyond the agency's capacity to monitor. The industry group Council for Responsible Nutrition opposed any suggestion that the sector needed stronger regulation.

== Prohibitions and treatment of violations ==
The Act expressly prohibits the "introduction, or delivery for introduction into interstate commerce of food... that is adulterated or misbranded", as well as the actual adulteration or misbranding of food. The Act further sets forth a broad range of powers that the FDA may exercise in order to prevent distribution of adulterated or misbranded food. In addition to the express powers set forth in the statute, the FDA exercises certain implied powers, such as the issuance of Warning Letters and recall orders.

The steps which the FDA may take in response to a violation include the following:

1. Sending an "untitled letter" to the violator indicating the concern and requesting a response detailing how the concern will be addressed by the violator.
2. Sending a Warning Letter to the violator specifically identifying the violation and requiring a response detailing how the violation will be addressed.
3. Issuing a press release, holding a press conference, having notices posted, or taking similar action to alert the public to the violation. Use of publicity is expressly authorized by the Act, and courts have held that the FDA need not give the alleged violator any notice or opportunity to be heard prior to the use of this measure. A party who feels that the FDA has wrongfully maligned its goods may file a lawsuit for defamation, but no such suit has ever succeeded.
4. Ordering the violator to recall the adulterated or misbranded products. Most recalls are voluntary, but the FDA has the authority under FDCA section 423(a) to order a recall in certain circumstances.
5. Ordering the violator to disgorge its products from sales of products to third parties, and provide restitution to those parties. The FDA also lacks statutory authority for this practice, but is able to coerce violators to disgorge profits through consent decrees. Courts have also found that they have the equitable power to order disgorgement and restitution as requested.
6. Petitioning a United States district courts to issue an injunction against the violation, as permitted by the Act, and to order the seizure of foods which violate the Act. The FDA has an easier burden to obtain both preliminary and permanent injunctive relief that does a private litigant, because the FDA is always acting in the public interest, and the injury sought to be prevented – violation of the laws designed to protect the public from harmful or misleading products – is presumed to be irreparable.
7. Seizing the offending food without first obtaining a court order, if the FDA has probable cause to believe that a misbranded food is dangerous to health or is fraudulent in a way that would cause commercial injury to the consumer. Where this occurs, the owner of the food may later seek to recover the seized food by initiating a proceeding in the local United States district court.
8. Seeking criminal penalties which may be imposed on violators, including imprisonment for up to a year and a fine of up to $1,000 for a first offense. Controversially, the president of a company that violates the Act may be found criminally liable for those violations even if he had no personal knowledge of the violations. Although the Act provides for civil penalties for certain violations relating to applications for approval of new drugs, it does not provide for civil penalties for violations involving food.

Where food is found to be adulterated, the FDA also has the option to offer the owner the opportunity to "recondition" the food – that is, to remove all traces and contamination, and submit that food for a reinspection by the FDA, at which time it may be approved for sale. Similarly, where food is found to be misbranded, the FDA has the option of offering the owner the opportunity to correct the labeling, and put the food back on the market with new labels that are not misleading.

== See also ==
- Regulation of tobacco by the U.S. Food and Drug Administration
