= Mostarda =

Condiment from Italy made of candied fruit and mustard

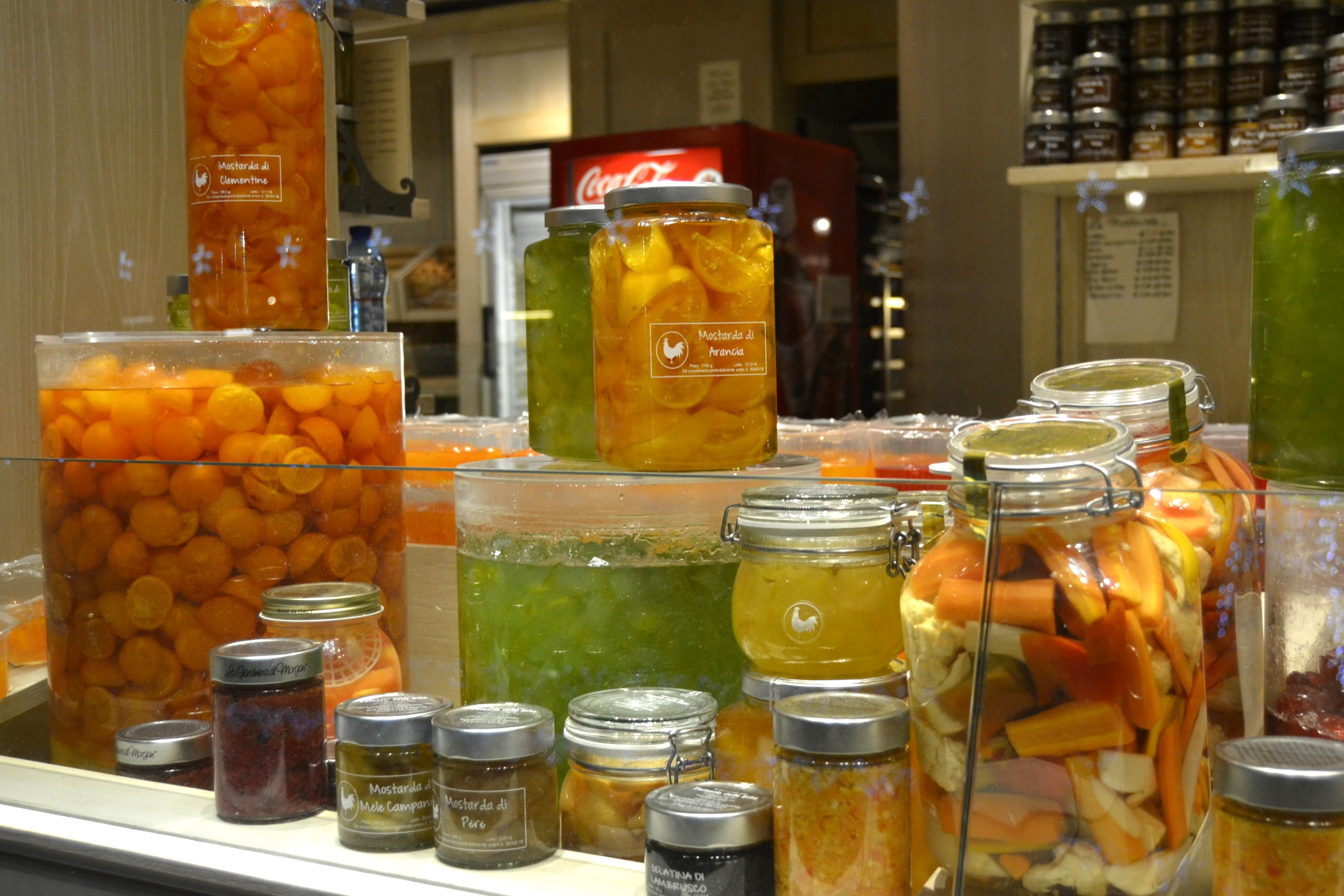
Mostarda di Cremona

Mostarda (sometimes also called mostarda di frutta) is a northern Italian condiment made of candied fruit and a mustard-flavoured syrup. Commercially the essential oil of mustard is employed, which has the advantage of transparency; in home cooking, mustard powder heated in white wine may be used.

Traditionally mostarda was served with boiled meats, the bollito misto, which is a speciality of northern Italian cooking. More recently it has become a popular accompaniment to cheeses.

The fruits used can be "apricots, cherries, figs, oranges, peaches, pears, and quince", as well as grape must.

== Variations ==
Mostarda di Cremona or mostarda cremonese (from Cremona) is made with several types of fruit, and is the version that typifies mostarda di frutta.

Mostarda di Mantova (also called mostarda di mele campanine or mostarda mantovana) is made from small, sour green apples called mele campanine.

Another notable mostarda is mostarda vicentina, which is a specialty of the town of Vicenza, in Veneto; it is characterized by a jam-like consistency and the use of quince (mele cotogne) as its main ingredient.

== See also ==
- List of mustard brands

== Sources ==
- Herbst, Sharon Tyler; Herbst, Ron (2013). The New Food Lover's Companion (5th ed.). Naperville, Illinois: Barron's Educational Series Inc. ISBN 978-1-4380-9233-1. LCCN 2013008951. OCLC 838195883.
