= Instant rice =

Fast-cooking rice

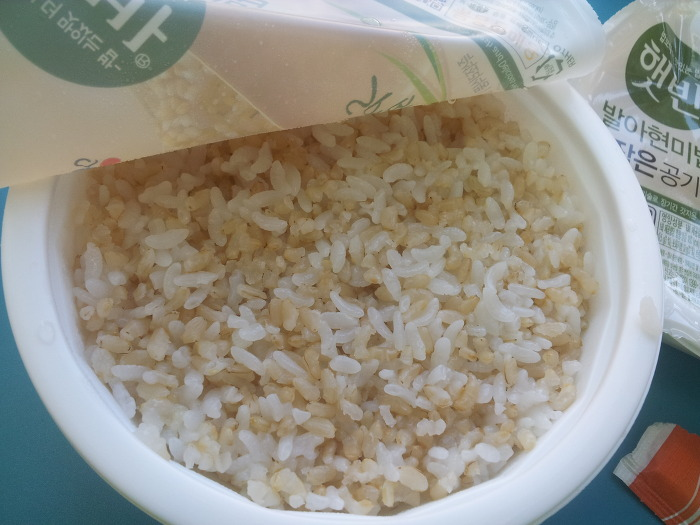
Instant brown rice still in its packaging

Instant rice is a white rice that is partly precooked and then is dehydrated and packed in a dried form similar in appearance to that of regular white rice. That process allows the product to be later cooked as if it were normal rice but with a typical cooking time of 5 minutes, not the 20–30 minutes needed by white rice (or the still greater time required by brown rice). This process was invented by Ataullah K. Ozai‐Durrani in 1939 and mass-marketed by General Foods starting in 1946 as Minute Rice, which is still made.

Instant rice is not the "microwave-ready" rice that is pre-cooked but not dehydrated; such rice is fully cooked and ready to eat, normally after cooking in its sealed package in a microwave oven for as little as 1 minute for a portion. Another distinct product is parboiled rice (also called "converted" rice, a trademark for what was long sold as Uncle Ben's converted rice); brown rice is parboiled to preserve nutrients that are lost in the preparation of white rice, not to reduce cooking time.

== Preparation process ==
Instant rice is made using several methods. The most common method is similar to the home cooking process. The rice is blanched in hot water, steamed, and rinsed. It is then placed in large ovens for dehydration until the moisture content reaches approximately twelve percent or less. The basic principle involves using hot water or steam to form cracks or holes in the kernels before dehydrating. In the subsequent cooking, water can more easily penetrate into the cracked grain, allowing for a short cooking time.

== Advantages and disadvantages ==
The notable advantage of instant rice is the rapid cooking time: some brands can be ready in as little as three minutes. Currently, several companies, Asian as well as American, have developed brands which only require 90 seconds to cook, much like a cup of instant noodles.

However, instant rice is more expensive than regular white rice due to the cost of the processing. The "cracking" process can lead to a significant increase in broken grains in a package. Like all white rice, instant rice has nutrients removed that are present in brown rice, and soluble minerals can be lost when rice is rinsed; like white rice, the product can be enriched to restore B-vitamins and other nutrients. Instant rice has fewer of the calories, carbohydrates, and protein than regular white rice. The quicker cooking method can result in the rice being less firm in texture than regular rice, and the processing results in a loss of flavor.
