= Diet food =

Type of food for weight alteration

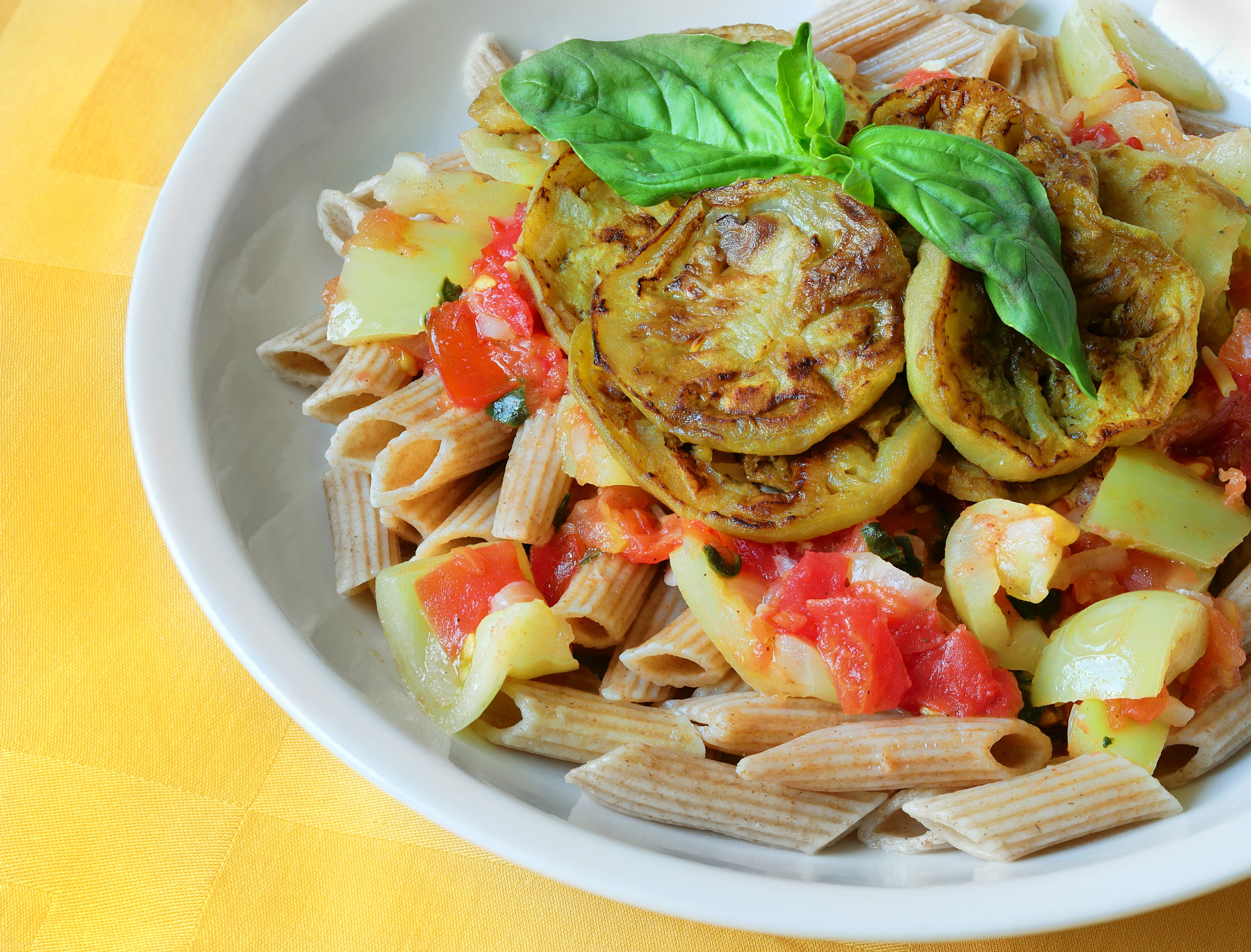
Penne with eggplant and basil in yogurt-tomato sauce. Dish is a part of cookbook for women with Gestational diabetes.

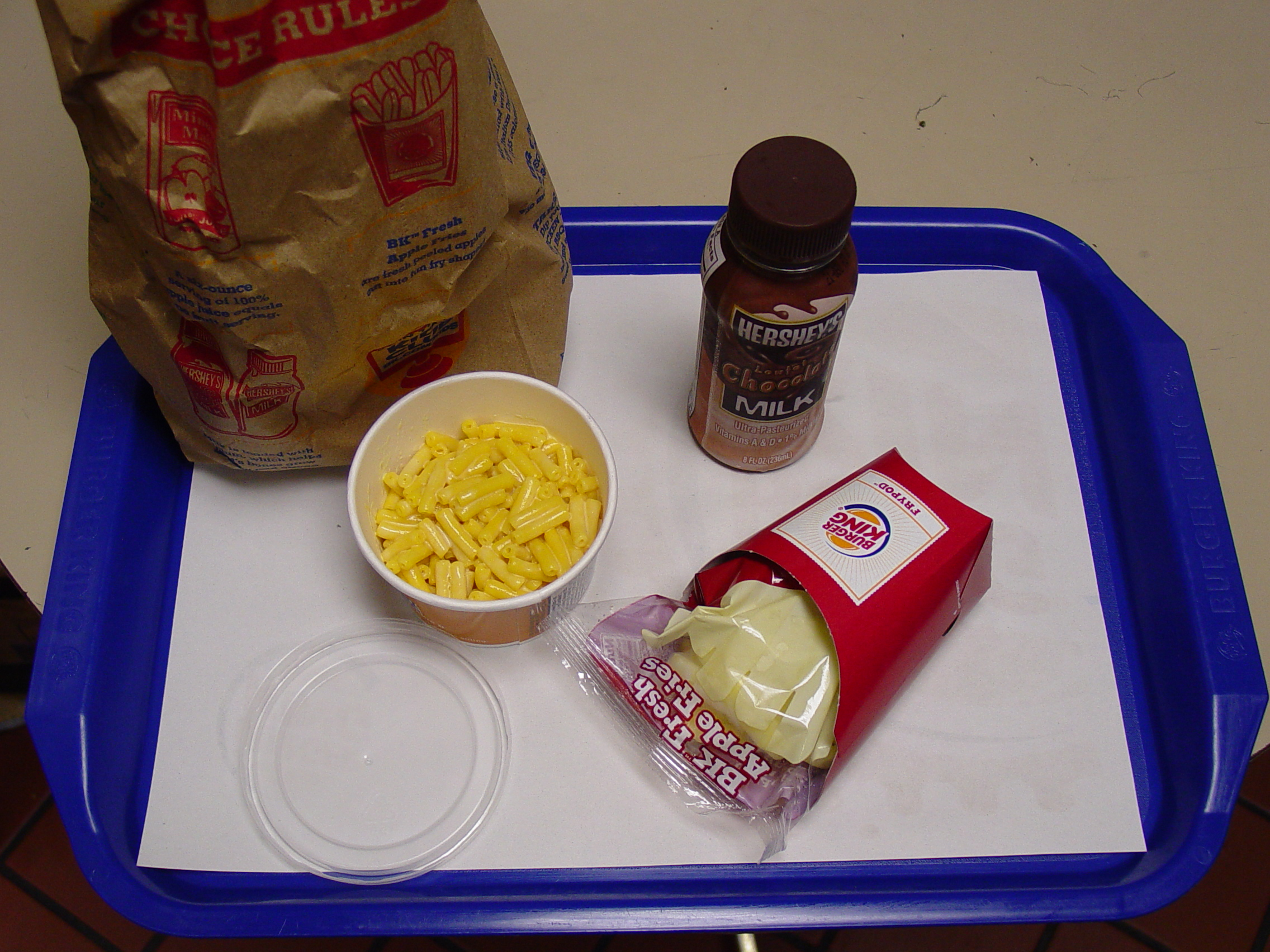
A "low fat" child's meal from Burger King, with "apple fries" replacing fried potato chips, and a serving of macaroni and cheese as its main dish

Diet food (or dietetic food) refers to any food or beverage whose recipe is altered to reduce fat, carbohydrates, and/or sugar in order to make it part of a weight loss program or diet. Such foods are usually intended to assist in weight loss or a change in body type, although bodybuilding supplements are designed to increase weight.

== Terminology ==
In addition to diet other words or phrases are used to identify and describe these foods including light, zero calorie, low calorie, low fat, no fat and sugar free. In some areas use of these terms may be regulated by law. For example, in the U.S. a product labeled as "low fat" must not contain more than 3 grams of fat per serving; and to be labeled "fat free" it must contain less than 0.5 grams of fat per serving.

== Process ==
The process of making a diet version of a food usually requires finding an adequate low-food-energy substitute for some high-food-energy ingredient. This can be as simple as replacing some or all of the food's sugar with a sugar substitute as is common with diet soft drinks such as Coca-Cola (for example Diet Coke), or substituting water. In some snacks, the food may be baked instead of fried thus reducing the food energy. In other cases, low-fat ingredients may be used as replacements.

In whole grain foods, the high fiber content effectively displaces some of the starch component of the flour. Since certain kinds of fibers have no food energy, this results in a moderate energy reduction. Another process relies on the intentional addition of other reduced-food-energy ingredients, such as resistant starch or dietary fiber, to replace part of the flour and achieve a more significant energy reduction.

== Example of low-fat foods ==
The low-fat foods are those that have 30% of their calories or less from fats. So, if a food contains fewer than 3 gram of fat per 100 calories, it is a low fat food. Examples of cereals, grain, and pasta products are corn or whole wheat tortillas, oatmeal, baked crackers, whole grain versions of noodles, and pita bread. Examples of protein sources are beans, lentils, tofu, egg white, tuna, and peas. On the other hand, polyunsaturated fatty acids such as omega 3 and omega 6 fatty acids can be beneficial to the body. Nutritious foods are avocado, almond, salmon, cashews, seeds, and walnuts.

== Controversy ==
In diet foods which replace the sugar with lower-food-energy substitutes, there is some controversy based around the possibility that the sugar substitutes used to replace sugar are themselves harmful. Artificial sweeteners have been the subject of intense scrutiny for decades, but according to the National Cancer Institute and other health agencies, there is no sound scientific evidence that any of the artificial sweeteners approved for use in the U.S. cause cancer or other serious health problems. Numerous research studies confirm that artificial sweeteners are generally safe in limited quantities, even for pregnant women.

In many low-fat and fat-free foods the fat is replaced with sugar, flour, or other full-food-energy ingredients, and the reduction in food energy value is small, if any.

== See also ==
- Negative-calorie food
- Olestra
- Online weight loss plans
- Obesity paradox
- Satiety value
