= Wyo-Ben, Inc. =

American bentonite mining company

- Type: Private
- Industry: Mining
- Founded: 1951
- Founder: Keith Brown, Rockwood Brown, Neal Brown, Barbara Brown Bixby, R.E. Dansby
- Headquarters: Billings, Montana
- Key people: David Brown (CEO)
- Products: Sodium bentonite

Wyo-Ben, Inc. is an American bentonite mining and processing company headquartered in Billings, Montana. The company produces sodium bentonite for industrial applications, including drilling fluids, iron ore pelletizing, absorbents, environmental sealants, and cat litter.

== History ==
Wyo-Ben was founded in 1951 as Wyo-Ben Products Co. The company's early operations in Greybull, Wyoming focused on supplying bentonite mud for rotary drilling and oil well cementing. In 1954, the company began supplying bentonite for iron ore pelletizing in Minnesota, and in 1963 signed a supply agreement with a plant in Sept-Îles, Quebec. The Greybull plant was upgraded in 1964, and a second facility opened in Lovell in 1969.

In 1980, Wyo-Ben opened a third processing plant in Thermopolis, increasing milling capacity to 650,000 tons per year. During the 1980s and 1990s, the company expanded the use of its bentonite products to support water well drilling, environmental sealing, directional drilling, tunneling, and wastewater treatment.

In 2020, Wyo-Ben launched Wyo-Ben Pet, a new division for the production of sodium bentonite cat litter, and opened a processing and packaging plant in Billings, Montana.

In 2023, Wyo-Ben acquired the bentonite operations of M-I SWACO, a division of Schlumberger, in Greybull, Wyoming. The plant was renamed Magnet Cove.

The company's mining operations are largely based in Wyoming, where it operates many surface mining pits and multiple processing plants, including facilities in Greybull, Lovell, and Thermopolis. The company produces over one million tons of bentonite annually.
