= California oil and gas industry =

Oil and gas industry of the US state of California

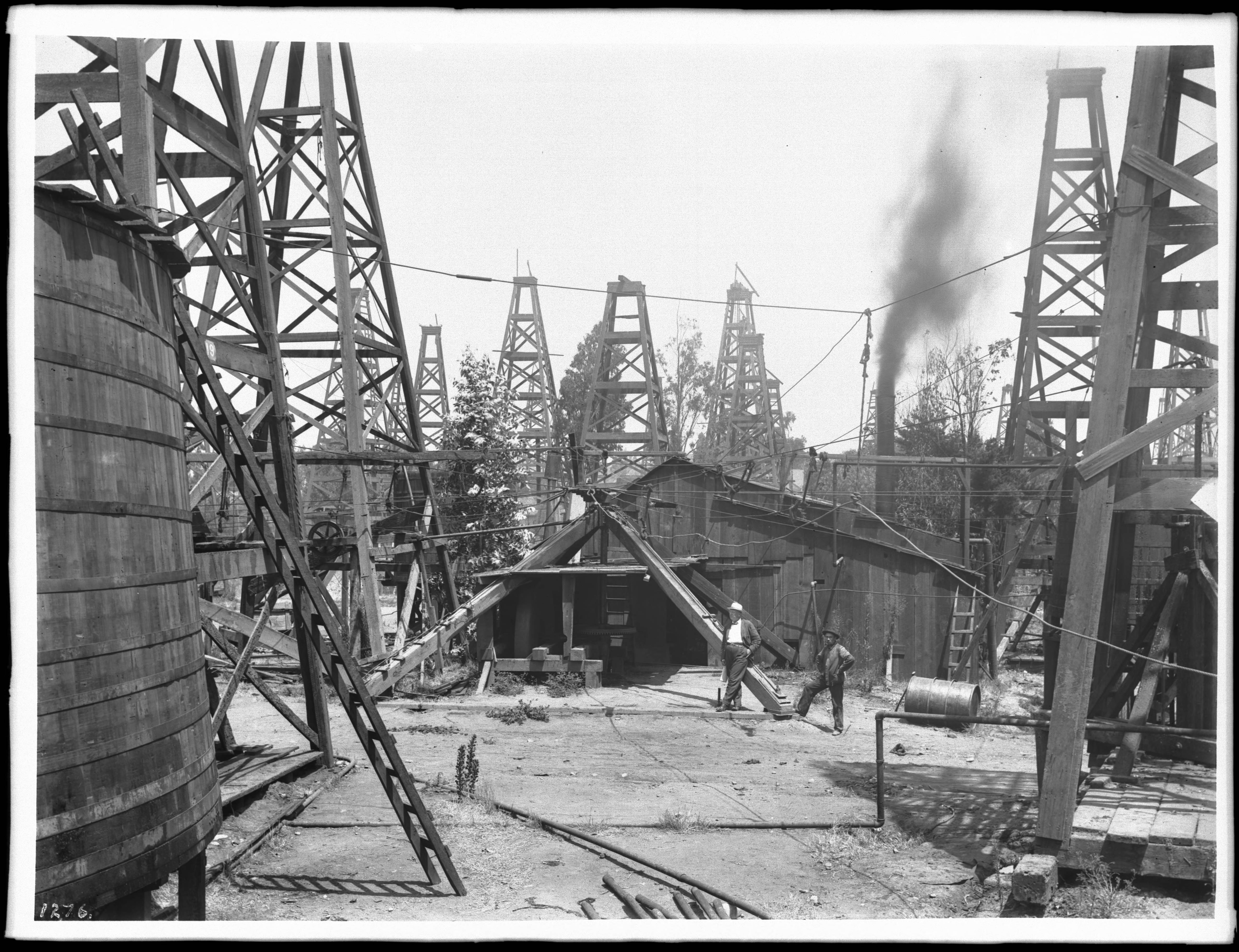
1904 photo of a Los Angeles oil field at Court and Toluca Street

The California oil and gas industry has been a major economic and cultural component of the US state of California for over a century. Oil production was a minor factor in the 19th century, with kerosene replacing whale oil and lubricants becoming essential to the machine age. Oil became a major California industry in the 20th century with the discovery of new fields around Los Angeles and the San Joaquin Valley, and the dramatic increase in demand for gasoline to fuel automobiles and trucks. In 1900 California pumped 4 million barrels (640,000 m^{3}), nearly 5% of the national supply. Then came a series of major discoveries, and the state pumped 100 million bbl (16 million m^{3}) in 1914, or 38% of the national supply. In 2012 California produced 197 million bbl (31 million m^{3}) of crude oil, out of the total 2,375 million bbl (378 million m^{3}) of oil produced in the US, representing 8.3% of national production. California drilling operations and oil production are concentrated primarily in Kern County, San Joaquin Valley and the Los Angeles Basin.

There is also some offshore oil and gas production in California, but there is now a permanent moratorium on new offshore oil and gas leasing and new oil platforms in both California and federal waters, although new wells can be drilled from existing platforms. These restrictions were imposed after the 1969 Santa Barbara oil spill released oil into the Pacific Ocean. As of 2022, California produced less than 25 percent of the crude oil used statewide, and the majority of its crude oil was imported from Ecuador, Saudi Arabia, Iraq, and Colombia.

In September 2024, California passed new laws allowing cities, counties, and local voters to block construction of new oil and gas wells in their communities, increasing requirements to plug and clean up idle oil and gas wells, and prohibiting the operation of oil and gas wells located in an oil field within the Baldwin Hills Conservancy in Inglewood.

== Early history ==
There was plenty of visible oil in California and eastern experts said it would be worth a fortune. The early oil ventures in the 1850s and 1860s were well-funded, but all of them failed. The drillers spent $1 million and their poor quality oil was worth only $10,000.

Prospectors after 1848 discovered an increasing number of oil seeps—oil seeping to the surface. In Northern California, there were oil seeps in Humboldt, Colusa, Santa Clara, and San Mateo Counties, and in the asphaltum seeps and bituminous residues in Mendocino, Marin, Contra Costa, Santa Clara, and Santa Cruz Counties. In Southern California, large seeps were found in Ventura, Santa Barbara, Kern, and Los Angeles Counties. Interest in oil and gas seeps was stirred in the 1850s and 1860s. Interest became widespread after the 1859 commercial discovery of oil in Pennsylvania.

In 1864, Yale chemistry professor Benjamin Silliman, Jr., a leading expert, examined the oil seepages in Ventura County, and wrote reports that indicated excellent commercial possibilities. This led Leland Stanford and his brother Josiah to dig oil tunnels into the south side of Sulphur Mountain, while Thomas A. Scott and Thomas Bard drilled into the north side. The Philadelphia & California Petroleum Company, drilled wells in the Ojai region between 1865 and 1867; one became California’s first "gusher."

As early as 1856 a company began working the tar pits at La Brea Ranch, near Los Angeles, distilling some oil. Initially these oil discoveries were done by hand digging a well with pick and shovel or even tunneling (by hand) into a mountain that contained oil. By sloping the tunnels downward the oil ran out the mouth to be collected. Some of this oil was so thick that when pipelines were used they had to be heated in winter to get the oil to flow. Transporting the oil to a market or refinery was nearly always a primary concern. In 1866 the first oil refinery in California was built near McKittrick Tar Pits in Kern County to process kerosene and asphalt.

Much of California’s early oil discoveries were in the form of asphalt also known as bitumen a sticky, black and highly viscous liquid or semi-solid form of petroleum. It was found in natural deposits and by processing it became a refined product. Some cities in California started asphalting their streets in the 1870s to keep down dust and mud. In the 20th century the primary use is in road construction, where it is used as the glue or binder mixed with aggregate particles or gravel to create asphalt concrete.

== Oil production ==
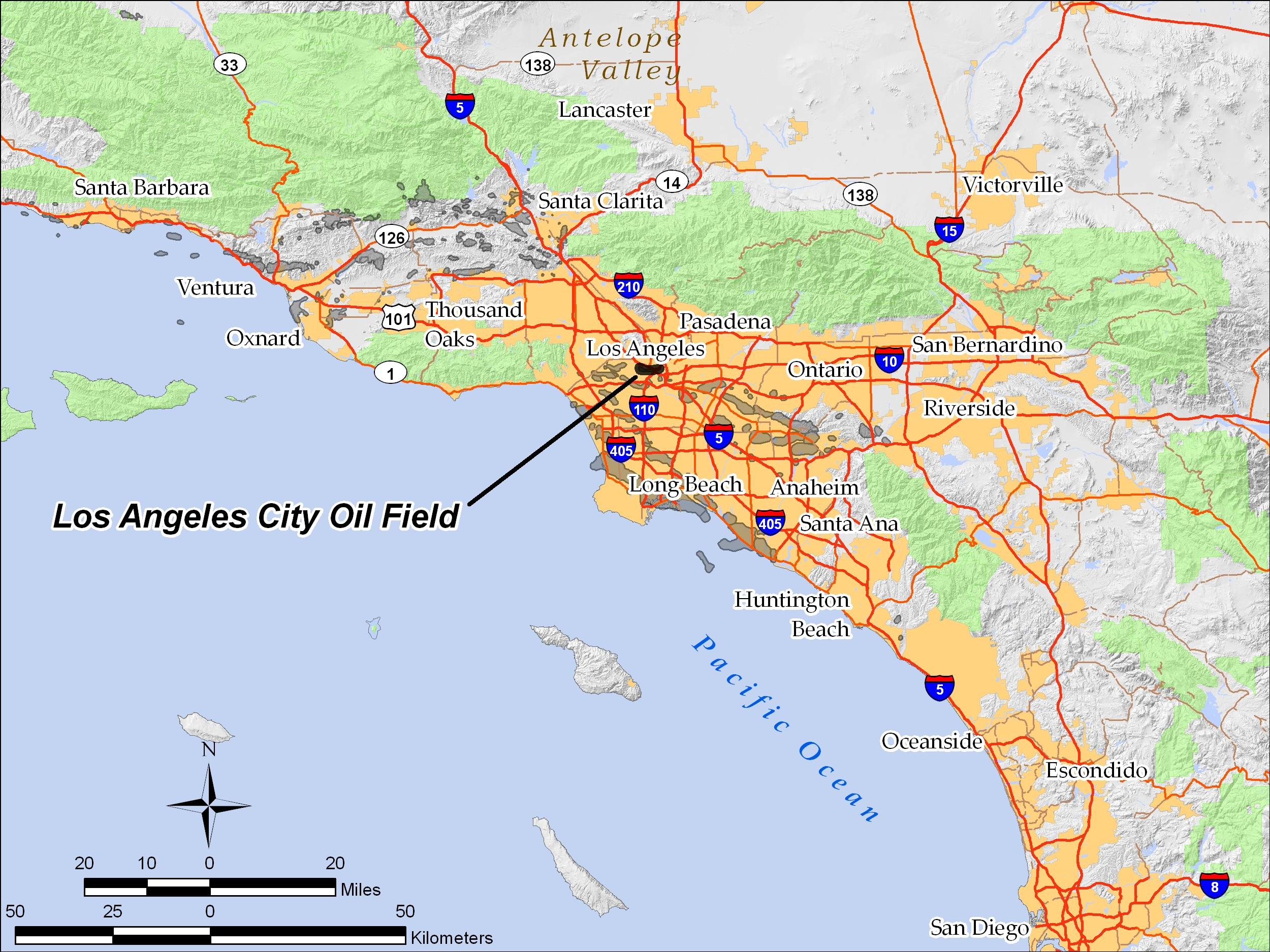
The Los Angeles City Oil Field. Other oil fields are shown in light gray.

The story of oil production in California began in the late 19th century. As of 2012, California was the nation's third most prolific oil-producing state, behind only Texas and North Dakota. In the 20th century, California’s oil industry grew to become the state’s number one GDP export and one of the most profitable industries in the region.

Standard Oil largely controlled the distribution of oil products in the state. After its breakup by the Supreme Court in 1911, its California operations became Standard Oil of California or "California Standard." It is now part of Chevron Corporation.

The Los Angeles City Oil Field was discovered in 1890, and made famous by Edward L. Doheny's successful well in 1892. The field became the top producing oil field in California, accounting for more than half of the state's oil in 1895. Doheny became one of the richest men in California. The peak year was 1901, with 200 separate oil companies active on the field. In 2011 only one small well remained in production.

In 1900, the state produced 4 million barrels. In 1903, California became the leading oil-producing state in the US, and traded the number one position back-and forth with Oklahoma through the year 1930. Production at the various oil fields increased to about 34 million barrels by 1904. By 1910 production has reached 78 million barrels.

By 1920, oil production in California had expanded to 77 million barrels. Between 1920 and 1930, new oil fields across Southern California were being discovered with regularity including Huntington Beach in 1920, Long Beach and Santa Fe Springs in 1921, and Dominguez in 1923. Southern California had become the hotbed for oil production in the United States. A 1926 Times magazine article stated that the Standard Oil Company of California (now Chevron) was then the largest individual producer of crude oil in the U.S. and dominated the marketing of petroleum products along the west coast of both Americas."

In 1929, however, the sense of crisis in the oil market grew as vast amounts of oil supplies were going unused in Southern California and throughout the US. The situation got worse during the Great Depression, with oil selling for 25 cents a barrel. The solution came in the mid-1930s when the Railroad Commission of Texas gained permission of Washington and the major oil companies to set the national price of oil.

=== San Joaquin Valley Oil ===
Except for a couple of mediocre wells on the "westside" of the San Joaquin Valley, and a few tar mining operations, farming was the mainstay of the valley in the late 1800s. However, the 1899 discovery of "black gold" in a shallow hand-dug oil well on the west bank of the Kern River changed all that. The Kern River discovery started an oil boom, and a forest of wooden derricks sprang up overnight on the flood plain just north of Bakersfield, a sleepy farm town known to most as "Bakers Swamp". Soon Kern River production accounted for 7 out of every 10 barrels of oil that came from California, and the Kern River field by 1903 had made California the top oil-producing state in the country.

Inspired by the Kern River discovery, oil prospectors fanned out across the San Joaquin Valley, and derricks began to pop up everywhere. Many discoveries followed, and a string of spectacular gushers at Coalinga, McKittrick and Midway-Sunset fields kept the valley in the oil news.

The Valley is also home to 21 giant oil fields which have produced over 100 million barrels of oil each, with four "super giants" that have produced over 1 billion barrels of oil. Among these "super giants" are Midway-Sunset with approximately 3.5 billion barrels of total production since discovery (the largest oil field in the lower 48 United States), Kern River Oil Field with 2.6 billion barrels of total production, South Belridge Oil Field with 2.1 billion barrels of total production, and Elk Hills Oil Field with approximately 2.2 billion barrels of total production over its lifespan (former U.S. Naval Petroleum Reserve).

=== Refining and distribution ===
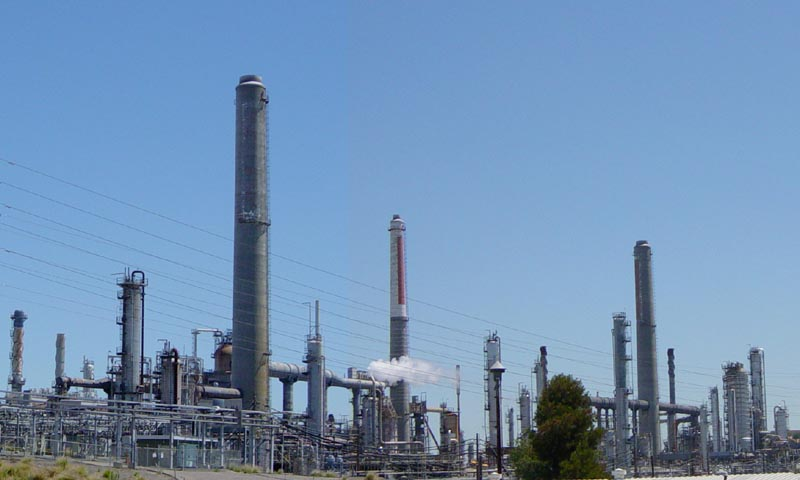
The Shell Martinez Refinery, in Martinez, California, has operated continuously since its construction in 1915.

Five companies controlled most of the refining and distribution of oil in California in the early twentieth century. The leader was California Standard (Chevron Corporation), a separate company since the court-ordered breakup of the Standard Oil trust in 1911. Second was the Union Oil Company, formed in 1890, and based in Ventura County. The Shell Company of California was the only affiliate of an outside Corporation. The Associated Oil Company was fourth, and was controlled by the Southern Pacific Railroad Company. The newest company was General Petroleum Company, organized in 1910, which operated in the San Joaquin and southern fields. Union Oil Company of California, ("Unocal") was bought out by Chevron in 2005 after a Chinese attempt to buy the company failed. A declining percentage of the oil supplied to California's refineries is produced in California, down to 23.4% in 2023 from 51.0% in 1993, thirty years earlier. 15.9% of oil supplied to California's refineries came from Alaska in 2023, and 60.7% came from foreign sources.

=== California shale oil (tight oil) production ===
Widely distributed in sedimentary basins of southern California is the Monterey shale, thought by some to contain more than 400 billion barrels of oil in place. The formation has for many years yielded oil in areas where it is naturally fractured, and oil companies are investigating ways to make the shale in currently non-productive areas give up the oil through artificial fracturing. Over some large areas, California's geologic layers are complexly folded, making horizontal drilling difficult. As of 2013, the Monterey shale has resisted attempts to obtain economic production of oil through hydraulic fracturing, fracking, which involves injecting water, sand, and chemicals into the shale under high pressure, to crack the rock and allow the oil and gas to flow. The U.S. Energy Information Administration estimated there were over 15 billion barrels of oil; further study reduced this amount to 21 million barrels of unconventional tight oil, owing to severe fracturing in the shale rock.

== Chronology of the California oil industry ==
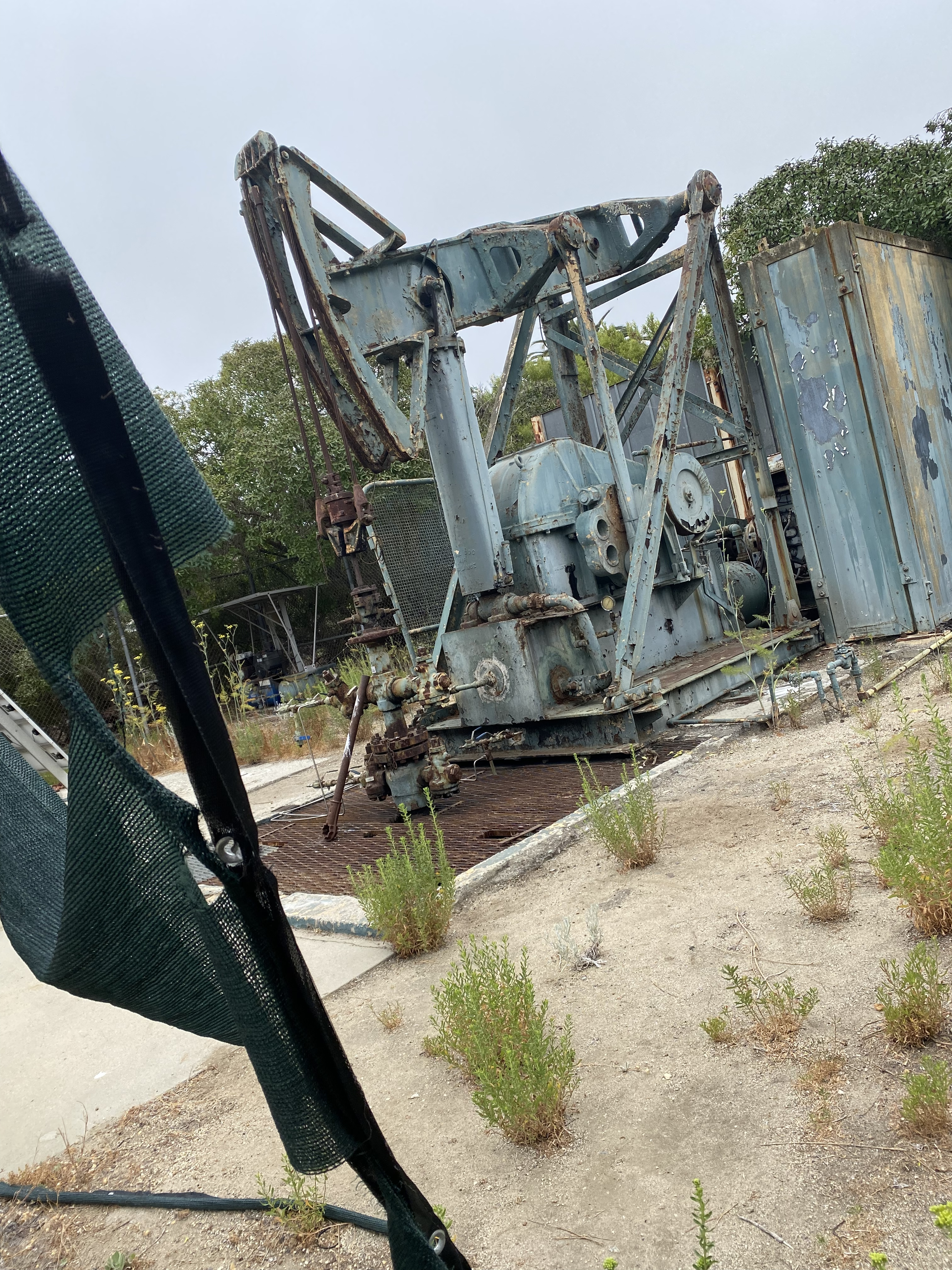
Derelict oil derrick, Playa Del Rey, California

- 1864: Tar mined from open pits at Asphalto (McKittrick) on west side of San Joaquin Valley.
- 1866: First refinery in Kern County built near McKittrick tar pits to process kerosene and asphalt.
- 1866: Oil is collected from tunnels dug at Sulphur Mountain in Ventura County by the brothers of railroad baron Leland Stanford
- 1866: First steam-powered rig in California drills an oil well at Ojai, near the Sulphur Mountain seeps.
- 1875: First commercial oil field in California is discovered at Pico Canyon in Los Angeles County.
- 1878: First wooden derrick in Kern County constructed at Reward to drill for flux oil to mix with asphalt.
- 1885: Gas wells are drilled in Stockton, California for fuel and lighting.
- 1885: Oil burners used on steam engines in the California oil fields, and later used on ships and locomotives, create new oil markets.
- 1886: Gasoline-powered automobiles introduced in Europe.
- 1887: "Wild Goose" well at Oil City, Coalinga comes in at 10 bbls/day, demonstrating potential of north part of basin.
- 1888: A steel-hulled tanker sails from Ventura to San Francisco.
- 1889: Oil wells drilled at Old Sunset (Maricopa) with a steam-powered rig mark discovery of Midway-Sunset field.
- 1890: Three oil companies merge to form The Union Oil Company of California in Santa Paula, California, by Lyman Stewart, Wallace Hardison, and Thomas Bard.
- 1890: Los Angeles City Oil Field is discovered
- 1892: Edward L. Doheny discovers oil in downtown Los Angeles
- 1893: Railroad reaches McKittrick, where tunnels and shafts are dug to mine asphalt.
- 1894: Old Sunset (Maricopa) part of Midway-Sunset has 16 wells producing 30 barrels of oil per day.
- 1896: Shamrock Gusher blows in at McKittrick and hastens end of tar mining operations.
- 1899: Hand-dug oil well discovers Kern River field and starts an oil boom in Kern County.
- 1900: 4.6% of national oil supply is pumped by California
- 1902: Arrival of railroad to haul fuel makes development of Midway-Sunset field economically feasible.
- 1902: First rotary drill rig in California reportedly drills a well at Coalinga field, but the hole is so crooked that a cable tool is used to redrill the well.
- 1903: Midway-Sunset Field and Kern River production makes California the top oil producing state.
- 1904: Kern River produces 17.2 million bbls of oil, exceeding annual Texas production.
- 1905: Well, Hill 4 has the first successful use of well cementing in Lompoc Oil Field.
- 1906-14: Union delivers 30,000 to 60,000 barrels of fuel oil per month for construction of Panama Canal
- 1908: Rotary drilling rigs and crews arrive in California from Louisiana and successfully drill wells at Midway-Sunset field.
- 1908: Ford Model T introduced the gasoline powered automobile as a mass consumer product
- 1909: Midway Gusher blows out near Fellows and focuses attention on Midway-Sunset field.
- 1910: Union Oil made a strategic alliance with the Independent Producers Agency, a group of small oil producers, to build pipelines from the Kern County fields to Union refineries on the coast.
- 1910: Lakeview Gusher blows in near Taft and becomes America's greatest oil gusher.
- 1911: Standard Oil split into three dozen companies, including Standard Oil of California
- 1912: Shell Oil enters California; gasoline price wars; independents organize to try to hold prices up
- 1914: California pumps 39% of national oil supply
- 1914: Panama Canal opens; allows oil shipments to Britain and East Coast
- 1915: The retail price of gasoline reaches a low of 11 cents a gallon
- 1916: Gasoline prices rise to 20 cents
- 1918: United States Fuel Administration (a temporary wartime agency) takes charge and raises prices
- 1919: Hay No. 7 catches fire at Elk Hills and becomes America's greatest gas gusher.
- 1919-20: Shortage of oil on West Coast
- 1921: Oil glut on West Coast sends prices down
- 1923: California pumps 36% of national supply
- 1923: Shipments to East Coast reach 53 million bbl
- 1925: Shell operates 2913 service stations in California, second to California Standard
- 1926: California pumps 29% of national supply
- 1929: Blowout prevention equipment becomes mandatory on oil and gas wells drilled in California.
- 1929: First well logs in California run by Shell in a well near Bakersfield (Kern County).
- 1930: Deepest well in the world is Standard Mascot #1, rotary drilled to 9,629 feet at Midway-Sunset.
- 1931, 1939: voters reject referendum on oil conservation
- 1936: First seismic exploration in California discovers Ten Section field near Bakersfield. Seismic discovery of the productive Paloma and Coles Levee anticlines soon follows
- 1940: California pumps 17% of national supply
- 1941-45: Stepped up production to meet war demands; gasoline is rationed at 3 gallons per week for most civilians
- 1943: Deepest well in the world is Standard 20-13, drilled to 16,246 feet at South Coles Levee.
- 1953: Deepest well in the world is Richfield 67-29 drilled to 17,895 feet at North Coles Levee.
- 1961: First steam recovery projects in Kern County start up at Kern River and Coalinga fields after a successful pilot by Shell at Yorba Linda field in Los Angeles.
- 1969: A blowout on the ocean bottom near Union Oil's platform leaked 90,000 barrels of oil into the water of the Santa Barbara Channel. Widespread criticism of both Union Oil and the offshore oil drilling industry led to passage of the 1970 National Environmental Policy Act (NEPA).
- 1973: Tule, Elk and Yowlumne Fields become the last 100-million-barrel fields discovered in Kern County.
- 1980: First horizontal well in Kern County is Texaco Gerard #6 in fractured schist at Edison field.
- 1980s: Cogeneration hastens the spread of steam recovery projects, which dramatically ramp up oil production.
- 1985: Kern County reaches an all-time production high of 256 million barrels of oil/year. At the same time, California reaches an all-time production high of 424 million barrels of oil/year.
- 1990s: 3D-seismic data and 3D-computer modeling of reservoirs bring new life to old fields.
- 1997: Deepest horizontal well in Kern County is Yowlumne 91X-3 with a measured depth of 14,300 feet. However, the well is surpassed only two years later by the relief well for the Bellevue blowout.
- 1998: A blowout and oil well fire at the Bellevue #1 wildcat in the East Lost Hills subthrust fuels hopes for the first major Kern County discovery in over a decade. However, subsequent drilling proves to be a disappointment.
- 2004: Congress balks at Chinese offer to buy Unocal
- 2005: Chevron buys Unocal
- 2010: Hydraulic fracturing of shale oil deposits leads to new supplies of natural gas and increased oil production
- 2015: The Refugio oil spill contaminated the Gaviota Coast, one of the most biologically diverse areas of the West Coast of the United States with 142,800 U.S. gallons (3,400 barrels; 541,000 liters) of crude oil.

=== California gas production ===
Initially the natural gas discovered was allowed to vent or was burned off. Only a relatively small fraction was used for lighting or heating purposes. At the turn of the century, before electrical lights were common, street lighting in cities was done by gas street lamps. Some homes were lighted with gas lamps. Much of this gas was generated from coal. By the time significant amounts of natural gas became available electricity was taking over the task of lighting.

The gas industry market structure was dramatically altered by the discovery of massive natural gas fields throughout the American Southwest beginning in 1918. The natural gas found was cleaner than manufactured gas and less expensive to produce. While natural gas sources were abundant in Southern California, no economical sources were then available in Northern California. In 1929, PG&E constructed a 300-mile pipeline from the Kettleman oil field to bring natural gas to the San Francisco Bay area. The city became the first major urban area to switch from manufactured coal gas to natural gas. The transition required the adjustment of burners and airflow valves on 1.75 million appliances and gas lamps. In 1936, PG&E expanded distribution with an additional 45-mile pipeline from Milpitas. PG&E gradually retired its gas manufacturing facilities, although some plants were kept on standby.

During World War II defense related population and industry growth boosted natural gas sales in California and cut deeply into the state's natural reserves. In 1947, PG&E entered into a contract with the Southern California Gas Company and the Southern Counties Gas Company to purchase natural gas through a new 1,000-mile (1,600 km) pipeline running from Texas and New Mexico to Los Angeles. Another agreement was reached with the El Paso Natural Gas Company of Texas for gas delivery to the California-Arizona border. In 1951, PG&E completed a 502-mile (808 km) gas main which connected with the El Paso network at the state line.

In 2012 California was the 13th largest state in terms of natural gas production, with a total annual production of 248 billion cubic feet of gas. Today natural gas is the second most widely used energy source in California. Depending on yearly weather conditions, about 45% of the total natural gas used is now burned in natural gas fired electric generator plants for electricity generation as coal burning plants are phased out. Most of these plants are cogeneration plants that use high temperature burning gas to run gas turbine driven generators and use the captured turbine exhaust heat as power for a steam turbine driven generator set. By combining these technologies almost 60% of the energy from burning gas can be converted from heat into electrical power. About 9% of the natural gas is used in facilitating the extraction of more oil and gas. Roughly 21% is used for residential space and water heating, cooking, clothes drying, etc.; about 8.6% is used for commercial building and water heating, 14.5% is used in industrial use and some of the rest has varied uses such as fueling bus fleets and UPS trucks.

California imports about 85% of its natural gas using six large gas lines. The majority of its natural gas comes from the American Southwest, the Rocky Mountain states, and Canada. The remaining 15% of California's natural gas is produced in-state, both off-shore and onshore.

Natural-gas-fired electricity generator plants have been the dominant use of natural gas California for many years. Natural gas is a dispatchable resource that fills in the gaps from other electrical resources when peak power loads are needed. In addition, CO_{2} releases from a natural-gas-fired generator station are about half the CO_{2} that coal-fired plants would emit. Typically, California gets about 14% of its electricity from water-generated electricity. The availability of hydroelectricity resources depends upon annual rainfall in the state and varies considerably year by year. The emergence of renewable and often highly variable resources for electricity generation such as solar and wind power has led to higher natural gas use in generation due to its lower cost, versatility, and high reliability as a source of electricity generation—so far.

Natural gas prices spiked in 2007 but have decreased significantly since then, as more gas has become available nationwide. The biggest change in U.S. gas supply has been the expansion of total natural gas production in the Lower 48 States, which increased 20% from 2005 to 2011. This increase is largely attributed to breakthroughs in horizontal drilling techniques and increased use of hydraulic fracturing.

Six major interstate pipelines deliver the 85% of natural gas imported to California. Inside California. more than 100,000 miles of intrastate pipelines take the natural gas to customers for immediate consumption or to underground storage facilities for later use. There are 10 operating natural gas storage facilities in California, which use underground depleted oil or natural gas production fields. All but three of them are owned by either Pacific Gas and Electric or Southern California Gas Company. The latest interstate pipeline additions are the 42-inch-diameter (1,100 mm) Ruby Pipeline, which began operation in California near the Oregon border in July 2011, and the Kern River Expansion, which came online in October 2011.

== In literature and film ==
The early California oil industry has served as a setting for several fictional novels and films:

- Oil! (1927), a novel of social criticism by Upton Sinclair, is set against the background of the California oil industry and is loosely based on the career of Edward Doheny and events related to the Teapot Dome scandal.
- There Will Be Blood (2007) is a film loosely based on Oil!, as well as original research on Doheny and the early California oil industry.
- In Burning Gold (1936), a World War I veteran becomes a wildcat prospector for oil and enjoys a major strike.
- Boom Town (1940) is a film about wildcatting in the mid-20th Century oil industry, including in the California oil fields. Much of the film was shot on location in California oil towns such as Taft and Bakersfield.
- Five Easy Pieces (1970), starting Jack Nicholson, features many scenes shot in the Southern California oilfields.
- The Two Jakes (1990), neo-noir movie directed by Jack Nicholson
- Wildcatting The Hills of Kettleman (2009) is a novel about early oil exploration in the Kettleman Hills.

== Notes ==
=== Bibliography ===
- Coleman, Charles M. (1952). P.G. and E. of California: the centennial story of Pacific Gas and Electric Company, 1852-1952.
