= Well, Hill 4 =

Historical landmark in California, United States

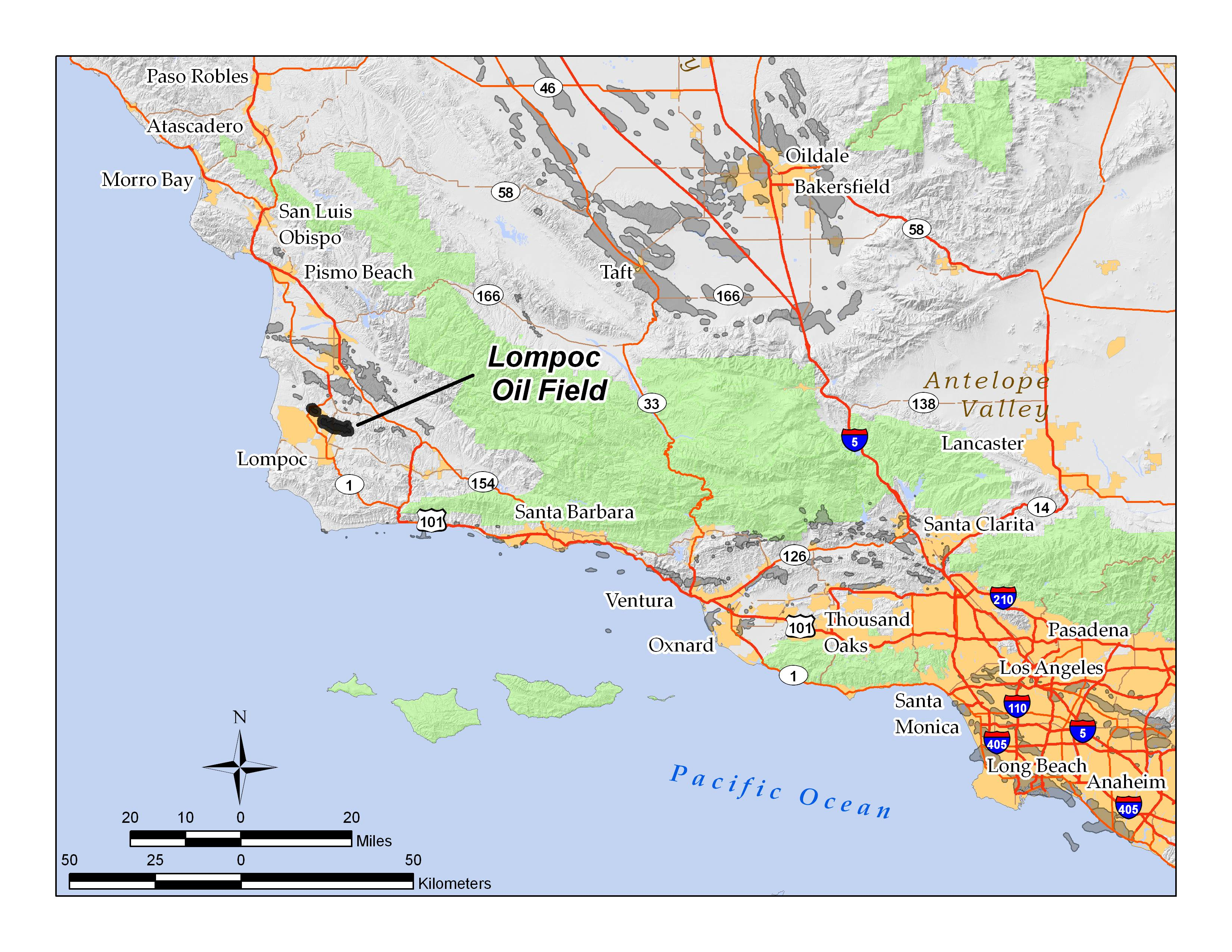
- Lompoc Oil Field map site of Well, Hill 4
- Location: Unocal Corporation, Lompoc, Santa Barbara County, California
- Coordinates: 34°42′58″N 120°24′33″W

California Historical Landmark
- Official name: Well, Hill 4
- Designated: May 1, 1957
- Reference no.: 582

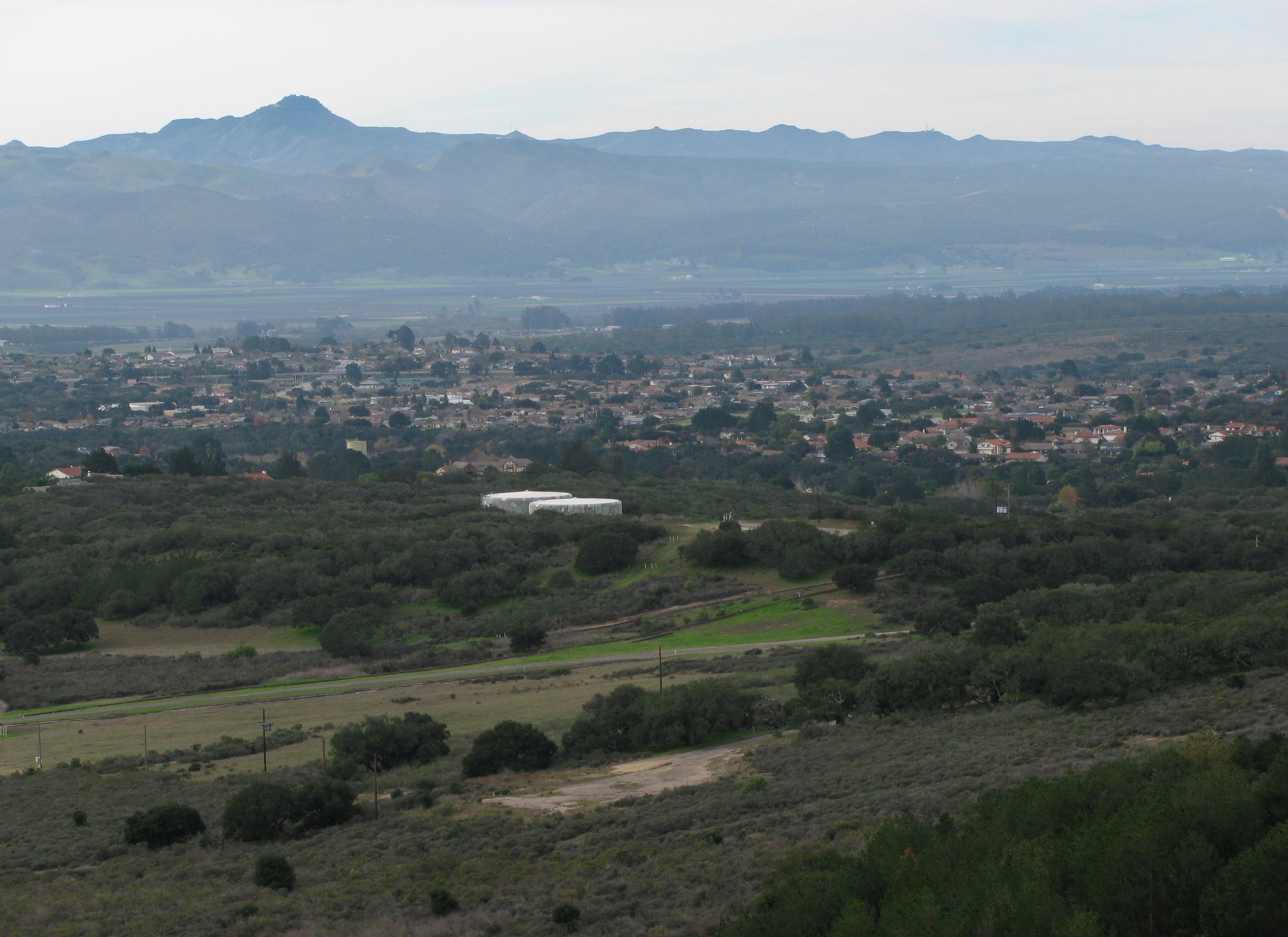
View from Harris Grade Road within the Lompoc Oil Field, south towards Vandenberg Village. The two storage tanks in the middle distance are on the field.

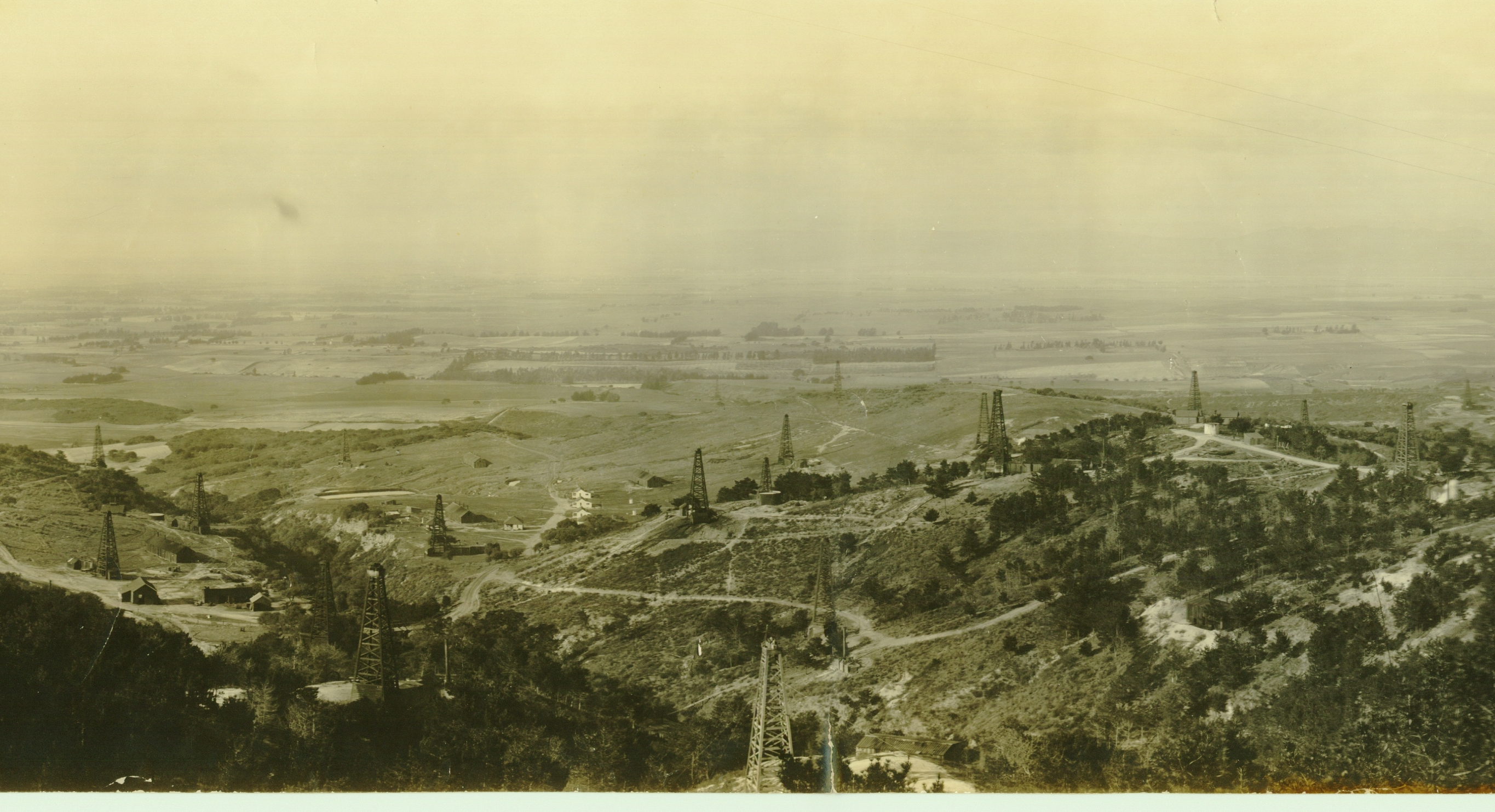
Orcutt Oil Field in 1911 just north of Well, Hill 4

The Well, Hill 4 is a California Historical Landmark in Lompoc, California's Lompoc Oil Field in the Purisima Hills. The oil well is the first one to use pumping cement to aid in installing a shutoff valve. The well became a California State Historical Landmark No. 582 on May 1, 1957. The well is located at Unocal Corporation facility in the Mission Hills District of Lompoc. The California Historical Landmark plaque and the well are 1.6 miles behind the gated facility in a canyon. Union Oil Company of California hit the oil on September 26, 1905. Union Oil had drilled down 2,507 feet to hit the oil deposit. The oil well did not run dry till 1951. The well is named after engineer Frank E. Hill who was the leader of the first successful pumping cement cap.

The California State Historical Landmark reads:

NO. 582 WELL, HILL 4 - This well, spudded September 26, 1905, and completed April 30, 1906, is the first oil well in which a water shutoff was attained by pumping cement through the tubing and back of the casing-forerunner of the modern cementing technique. It was drilled to a depth of 2,507 feet by Union Oil Company of California, 1,872 feet of 10-inch casing and 2,237 feet of 8-inch casing were so securely cemented off that the well produced for over forty-five years.

== See also ==
- History of Santa Barbara, California
- California Historical Landmarks in Santa Barbara County, California
- California oil and gas industry
