= Monochloride =

monochloride may refer to:

- Aluminium monochloride, the metal halide with the formula AlCl
- Astatine monochloride, AtCl
- Bromine monochloride, also called bromine(I) chloride, bromochloride, and bromine chloride, BrCl
- Calcium monochloride, CaCl
- Copper monochloride, CuCl
- Indium monochloride, InCl
- Iodine monochloride, the chemical compound with the formula ICl. It is a red-brown compound that melts near room temperature
- Selenium monochloride, an inorganic compound with the formula Se_{2}Cl_{2}
- Thallium monochloride, TlCl
