= Monocalcium citrate =

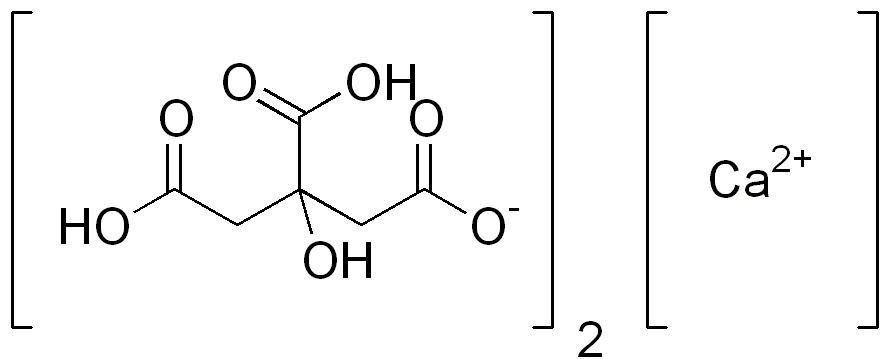

Names
- IUPAC name calcium tetrahydrogen 2-hydroxypropane-1,2,3-tricarboxylate

Identifiers
CAS Number	109459-70-3
3D model (JSmol)	Interactive image
ChemSpider	35803758
E number	E333i (antioxidants, ...)
PubChem CID	57462251
UNII	78TPW2F8XF
CompTox Dashboard (EPA)	DTXSID30726685
- InChI: InChI=1S/2C6H8O7.Ca/c2*7-3(8)1-6(13,5(11)12)2-4(9)10;/h2*13H,1-2H2,(H,7,8)(H,9,10)(H,11,12);/q;;+2/p-2 Key: OWFJMGQSOHDIPP-UHFFFAOYSA-L; InChI=1/2C6H8O7.Ca/c2*7-3(8)1-6(13,5(11)12)2-4(9)10;/h2*13H,1-2H2,(H,7,8)(H,9,10)(H,11,12);/q;;+2/p-2 Key: OWFJMGQSOHDIPP-NUQVWONBAR
- SMILES: OC(CC(C(O)=O)(O)CC([O-])=O)=O.OC(CC(C(O)=O)(O)CC([O-])=O)=O.[Ca+2]

Properties
Chemical formula	C_{12}H_{14}CaO_{14}
Molar mass	422.31 g/mol
- Except where otherwise noted, data are given for materials in their standard state (at 25 °C [77 °F], 100 kPa). verify (what is ?) Infobox references

Monocalcium citrate is a compound with formula C_{12}H_{14}CaO_{14}. It is a calcium acid salt of citric acid. It is used as a firming agent in food, and as an acidity regulator and sequestrant.

== See also ==
- Calcium citrate
- Dicalcium citrate
