= Calcium chloride transformation =

Laboratory technique in bacterial cell biology

Calcium chloride (CaCl_{2}) transformation is a laboratory technique in prokaryotic (bacterial) cell biology. The addition of calcium chloride to a cell suspension promotes the binding of plasmid DNA to lipopolysaccharides (LPS). Positively charged calcium ions attract both the negatively charged DNA backbone and the negatively charged groups in the LPS inner core. The plasmid DNA can then pass into the cell upon heat shock, where chilled cells (+4 degrees Celsius) are heated to a higher temperature (+42 degrees Celsius) for a short time.

== History of bacterial transformation ==
Frederick Griffith published the first report of bacteria's potential for transformation in 1928. Griffith observed that mice did not succumb to the "rough" type of pneumococcus (Streptococcus pneumoniae), referred to as nonvirulent, but did succumb to the "smooth" strain, which is referred to as virulent. The smooth strain's virulence could be suppressed with heat-killing. However, when the nonvirulent rough strain was combined with the heat-killed smooth strain, the rough strain managed to pick up the smooth phenotype and thus become virulent. Griffith's research indicated that the change was brought on by a nonliving, heat-stable substance generated from the smooth strain. Later on, Oswald Avery, Colin MacLeod, and Maclyn McCarty identified this transformational substance as DNA in 1944.

== Principle of calcium chloride transformation ==
Since DNA is a very hydrophilic molecule, it often cannot penetrate through the bacterial cell membrane. Therefore, it is necessary to make bacteria competent in order to internalize DNA. This may be accomplished by suspending bacteria in a solution with a high calcium concentration, which creates tiny holes in the bacterium's cells. Calcium suspension, along with the incubation of DNA together with competent cells on ice, followed by a brief heat shock, will directly lead extra-chromosomal DNA to forcedly enter the cell.

According to previous research, the LPS receptor molecules on the competent cell surface bind to a bare DNA molecule. This binding occurs as the negatively charged DNA molecules and LPS form coordination complexes with the divalent cations. Due to its size, DNA cannot pass through the cell membrane on its own to reach the cytoplasm. The cell membrane of CaCl_{2}-treated cells is severely depolarized during the heat shock stage, and as a result, the drop in membrane potential reduces the negative nature of the cell's internal potential, allowing negatively charged DNA to flow into the interior of the cell. Afterwards, the membrane potential can be raised back to its initial value by subsequent cold shock.

== Competent cells ==
Competent cells are bacterial cells with re-designed cell walls that make it easier for foreign DNA to get through. Without particular chemical or electrical treatments to make them capable, the majority of cell types cannot successfully take up DNA, for that reason, treatment with calcium ions is the typical procedure for modifying bacteria to be permeable to DNA. In bacteria, competence is closely regulated, and different bacterial species have different competence-related characteristics. Although they share some similarity, the competence proteins generated by Gram-positive and Gram-negative bacteria are different.

=== Natural competence ===
Natural competence sums up in three methods where bacteria can acquire DNA from their surroundings: conjugation, transformation, and transduction. As DNA is inserted into the cell during transformation, the recipient cells must be at certain physiological condition known as the competent state in order to take up transforming DNA. Once the DNA has entered the cell's cytoplasm, enzymes such as nuclease can break it down. In cases where the DNA is extremely similar to the cell's own genetic material, DNA-repairing-enzymes recombine it with the chromosome instead.

=== Artificial competence ===
Evidently, a cell's genes do not include any information on artificial competence. This type of competence requires a laboratory process that creates conditions that do not often exist in nature so that cells can become permeable to DNA. Although the efficiency of transformation is often poor, this process is relatively simple and quick to be applied in bacterial genetic engineering. Mandel and Higa, who created an easy procedure based on soaking the cells in cold CaCl_{2}, provided the basis for obtaining synthetic competent cells. Chemical transformation, such as calcium chloride transformation and electroporation are the most commonly used methods to transform bacterial cells, like E. coli cells, with plasmid DNA.

== Method for calcium chloride transformation ==
Calcium chloride treatment is generally used for the transformation of E. coli and other bacteria. It enhances plasmid DNA incorporation by the bacterial cell, promoting genetic transformation. Plasmid DNA can attach to LPS by being added to the cell solution together with CaCl_{2}. Thus, when heat shock is applied, the negatively charged DNA backbone and LPS combine, allowing plasmid DNA to enter the bacterial cell.

The process is summarized in the following steps according to The Undergraduate Journal of Experimental Microbiology and Immunology (UJEMI) protocol:

1. Prepare a bacterial culture in LB broth
2. Before starting the main procedure, use the required volume of the previously made culture to inoculate the required volume of fresh LB broth
3. Pellet the cells by centrifuging at 4 °C at 4000 rpm for 10 minutes
4. Pour off the supernatant and resuspend cells in 20 mL ice-cold 0.1 M CaCl_{2}, then leave immediately on ice for 20 minutes
5. Centrifuge as in step 3, a more diffused pellet will be obtained as an indication of competent cells
6. Resuspend in cold CaCl_{2} as in step 4
7. Pour off supernatant and resuspend cells in 5 mL ice-cold 0.1 M CaCl_{2} along with 15% glycerol to combine pellets
8. Transfer the suspensions to sterile thin glass tubes for effective heat shocks
9. Add the required mg amount of DNA in the suspension tubes, and immediately leave on ice
10. Place the tubes on a 42 °C water bath for a 30 seconds and return immediately to ice for 2 minutes
11. Add 1 mL of LB or SOC medium
12. Transfer each tube to the required mL LB broth amount in a new flask
13. Incubate accordingly with shaking at 37 °C at 200 rpm for 60 min, however, it is advised to leave it for 90 minutes in order to allow bacteria to recover
14. Plate 1:10 and 1:100 dilutions of the incubated cultures on selective/ screening plates (e.g. Ampicillin and/or X-gal) onto LB plates to which the antibiotics to be used for selection have been added
15. Incubate overnight at 37 °C
16. Finally, observe isolated colonies on the plates
