= Cement accelerator =

Chemical used in concrete production

A cement accelerator is an admixture for the use in concrete, mortar, rendering or screeds. The addition of an accelerator speeds the setting time and thus cure time starts earlier. This allows concrete to be placed in winter with reduced risk of frost damage. Concrete is damaged if it does not reach a strength of 500 pounds per square inch (3.4 MPa) before freezing.

Typical chemicals used for acceleration today are calcium nitrate (Ca(NO_{3})_{2}), calcium nitrite (Ca(NO_{2})_{2}), calcium formate (Ca(HCOO)_{2}) and aluminium compounds. Calcium chloride (CaCl_{2}) is the most efficient and least expensive accelerator and was formerly very popular. However, chloride anions are very corrosive for the steel of the reinforcement bars (rebars) so its use is no longer recommended and in many countries actually prohibited. This de facto caution comes from the fact that chloride anions cause severe pitting corrosion of steel rebars. As the local corrosion of a rebar can lead to its rupture, it can compromise the tensile strength of reinforced concrete and so the structural stability of an edifice. Thiocyanate compounds can also corrode reinforcing but are safe at recommended dosage levels. Sodium compounds might compromise the long term compressive strength if used with alkali-reactive aggregates.

Novel alternatives include cement based upon calcium sulphoaluminate (CSA), which sets within 20 minutes, and develops sufficient rapid strength that an airport runway can be repaired in a six-hour window, and be able to withstand aircraft use at the end of that time, as well as in tunnels and underground, where water and time limitations require extremely fast strength and setting.
