= Dicalcium citrate =

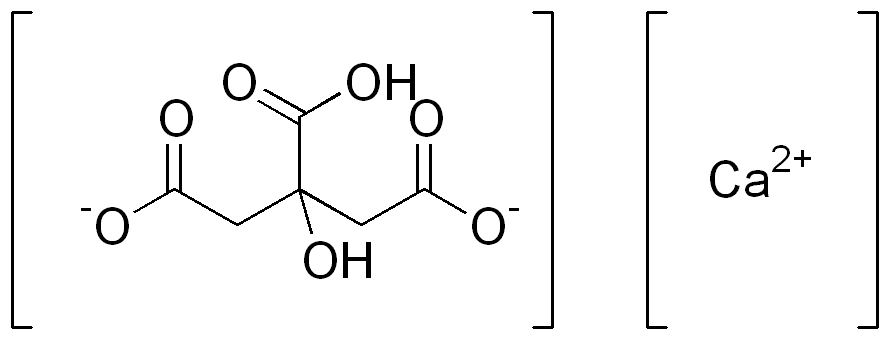

Names
- IUPAC name Calcium dihydrogen 2-hydroxypropane-1,2,3-tricarboxylate

Identifiers
CAS Number	1204587-66-5
3D model (JSmol)	Interactive image
ChemSpider	22778
PubChem CID	155804709
UNII	LGH2B6RC26
CompTox Dashboard (EPA)	DTXSID601011292
- InChI: InChI=1S/C6H8O7.Ca/c7-3(8)1-6(13,5(11)12)2-4(9)10;/h13H,1-2H2,(H,7,8)(H,9,10)(H,11,12);/q;+2/p-2 Key: PFKGDYCESFRMAP-UHFFFAOYSA-L; InChI=1S/C6H10O4.2Ca.3H2O/c7-3-1-6(10,5-9)2-4-8;;;;;/h1-5H2;;;3*1H2/q-4;2*+2;;; Key: NASRAZMFZQSAIG-UHFFFAOYSA-N
- SMILES: [O-]C(CC(C(O)=O)(O)CC([O-])=O)=O.[Ca+2]

Properties
Chemical formula	CaC_{6}H_{6}O_{7}
Molar mass	230.19 g/mol
- Except where otherwise noted, data are given for materials in their standard state (at 25 °C [77 °F], 100 kPa). verify (what is ?) Infobox references

Dicalcium citrate is a compound with formula CaC_{6}H_{6}O_{7}. It is a calcium acid salt of citric acid.

== See also ==
- Calcium citrate
- Monocalcium citrate
