= Calcium(I) chloride =

Names
- IUPAC name calcium(I) chloride
- Other names calcium monochloride

Identifiers
CAS Number	15606-71-0
3D model (JSmol)	Interactive image
- InChI: InChI=1S/Ca.ClH/h;1H/q+1;/p-1 Key: WGPMOVAPQPJDDK-UHFFFAOYSA-M
- SMILES: [Ca]Cl

Properties
Chemical formula	CaCl
Molar mass	75.53 g/mol
Appearance	gas

Related compounds
Other cations	calcium(II) chloride
- Except where otherwise noted, data are given for materials in their standard state (at 25 °C [77 °F], 100 kPa). verify (what is ?) Infobox references

Calcium(I) chloride (CaCl) is a diatomic molecule observed in certain gases.

A solid with the composition CaCl was reported in 1953; however, later efforts to reproduce this work failed. Molecules of CaCl have been observed in the atmospheres of carbon stars.
