= Firming agent =

Food additives that strengthen processed food

Firming agents are food additives added in order to precipitate residual pectin, thus strengthening the structure of the food and preventing its collapse during processing.

These are salts, typically lactates or phosphates, calcium salts or aluminum sulfates.

They are mainly used for (fresh) fruit and vegetables. For example, in the case of fruit sold cut into wedges, the pulp can be sprayed with a solution of the respective salt. They are salts that react with an ingredient in the product, such as the pectin in the fruit.

Typical firming agents are:

- Calcium carbonate (E170)
- Calcium hydrogen sulfite (E227)
- Calcium citrates (E333)
- Calcium phosphates (E341)
- Calcium sulfate (E516)
- Calcium chloride (E509)
- Magnesium chloride (E511)
- Magnesium sulfate (E518)
- Calcium gluconate (E578)
- Magnesium gluconate (E580)
