= Calcium chloride =

Chemical compound

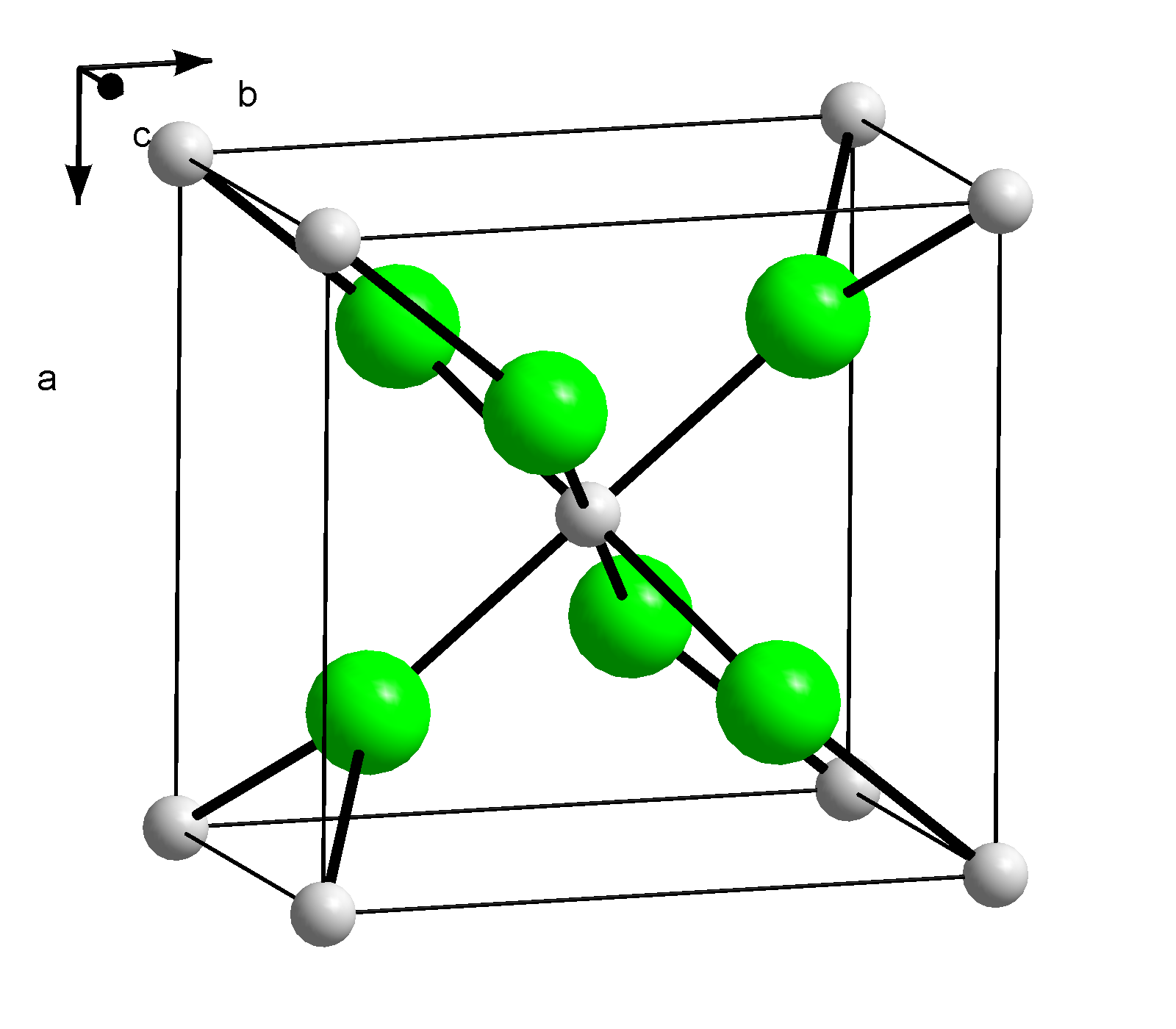
- Structure of calcium chloride, (chlorine is green, calcium is gray)

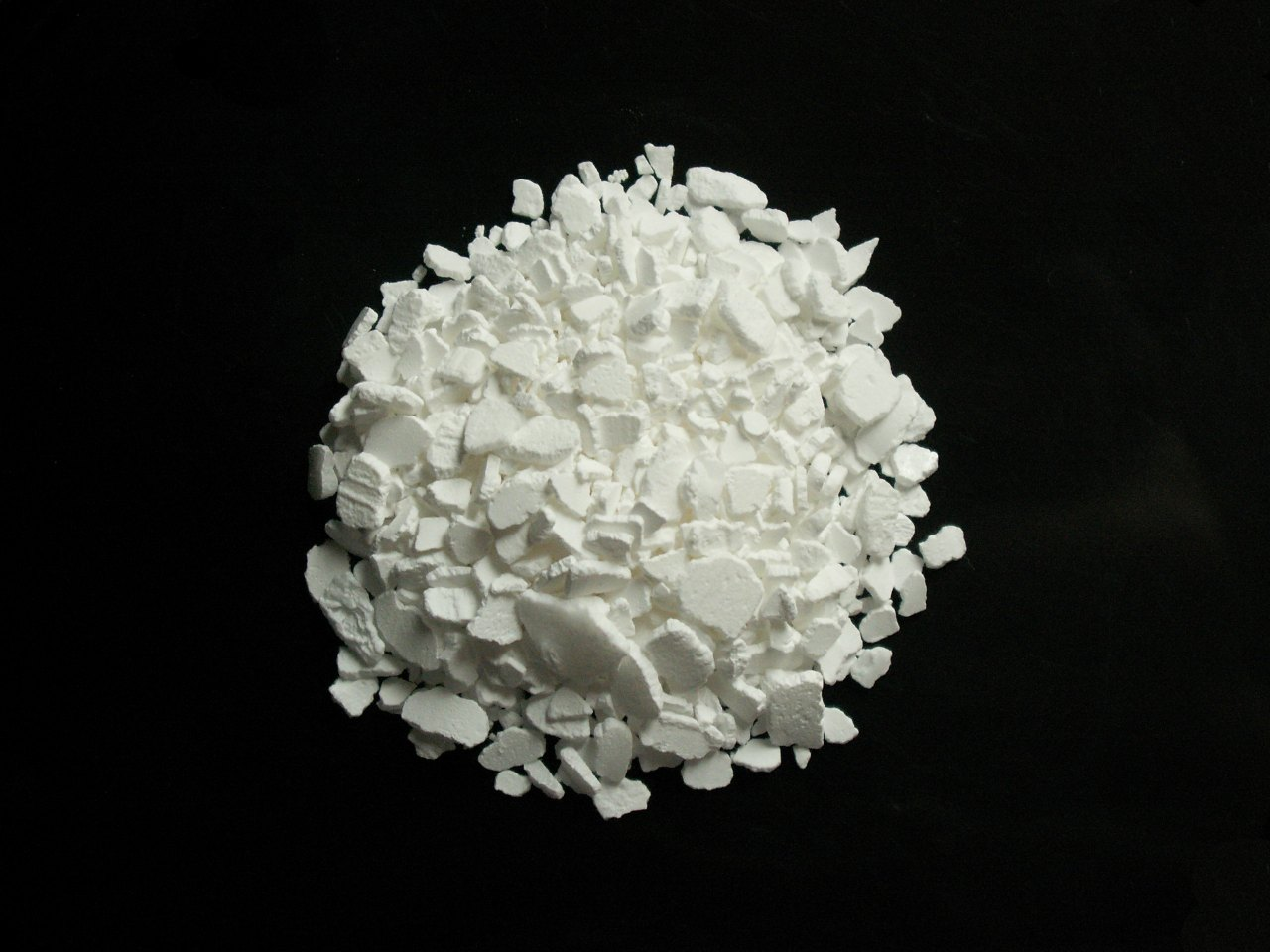
- Sample of calcium chloride

Names
- IUPAC name Calcium chloride
- Other names: Neutral calcium chloride; calcium(II) chloride; calcium dichloride (1:2)

Identifiers
| CAS Number | 10043-52-4; 22691-02-7 (monohydrate); 10035-04-8 (dihydrate); 25094-02-4 (tetrahydrate); 7774-34-7 (hexahydrate) |
| 3D model (JSmol) | Interactive image; Interactive image; monohydrate: Interactive image; dihydrate: Interactive image; hexahydrate: Interactive image |
| ChEBI | CHEBI:3312 |
| ChEMBL | ChEMBL1200668 |
| ChemSpider | 23237 |
| DrugBank | DB01164 |
| ECHA InfoCard | 100.030.115 |
| EC Number | 233-140-8 |
| E number | E509 (acidity regulators, ...) |
| PubChem CID | 24854 |
| RTECS number | EV9800000 |
| UNII | OFM21057LP; LEV48803S9 (monohydrate); M4I0D6VV5M (dihydrate); 1D898P42YW (hexahydrate) |
| CompTox Dashboard (EPA) | DTXSID5020235 |
- InChI: InChI=1S/Ca.2ClH/h;2*1H/q+2;;/p-2 Key: UXVMQQNJUSDDNG-UHFFFAOYSA-L; InChI=1/Ca.2ClH/h;2*1H/q+2;;/p-2 Key: UXVMQQNJUSDDNG-NUQVWONBAG
- SMILES: Cl[Ca]Cl; [Ca+2].[Cl-].[Cl-]; monohydrate: Cl[Ca]Cl.O; dihydrate: Cl[Ca]Cl.O.O; hexahydrate: Cl[Ca]Cl.O.O.O.O.O.O

Properties
| Chemical formula | CaCl_{2} |
| Molar mass | 110.98 g·mol^{−1} |
| Appearance | White hygroscopic powder |
| Odor | Odorless |
| Density | 2.15 g/cm^{3} (anhydrous); 2.24 g/cm^{3} (monohydrate); 1.85 g/cm^{3} (dihydrate); 1.83 g/cm^{3} (tetrahydrate); 1.71 g/cm^{3} (hexahydrate) |
| Melting point | 772–775 °C (1,422–1,427 °F; 1,045–1,048 K) (anhydrous); 260 °C (500 °F; 533 K) (monohydrate, decomposes); 175 °C (347 °F; 448 K) (dihydrate, decomposes); 45.5 °C (113.9 °F; 318.6 K) (tetrahydrate, decomposes); 30 °C (86 °F; 303 K) (hexahydrate, decomposes) |
| Boiling point | 1,935 °C (3,515 °F; 2,208 K) anhydrous |
| Solubility in water | Anhydrous: 74.5 g/100mL (20 °C (68 °F; 293 K)); Dihydrate: 134.5 g/100mL (60 °C (140 °F; 333 K)); 152.4 g/100mL (100 °C (212 °F; 373 K)); α-Tetrahydrate: 90.8 g/100mL (20 °C (68 °F; 293 K)); 114.4 g/100mL (40 °C (104 °F; 313 K)); Hexahydrate: 49.4 g/100mL (−25 °C (−13 °F; 248 K)); 59.5 g/100mL (0 °C (32 °F; 273 K)); 65 g/100mL (10 °C (50 °F; 283 K)); 81.1 g/100mL (25 °C (77 °F; 298 K)); 102.2 g/100mL (30.2 °C (86.4 °F; 303.3 K)) |
| Solubility in ethanol | 18.3 g/100g (0 °C (32 °F; 273 K)); 25.8 g/100g (20 °C (68 °F; 293 K)); 35.3 g/100g (40 °C (104 °F; 313 K)); 56.2 g/100g (70 °C (158 °F; 343 K)) |
| Solubility in methanol | 21.8 g/100g (0 °C (32 °F; 273 K)); 29.2 g/100g (20 °C (68 °F; 293 K)); 38.5 g/100g (40 °C (104 °F; 313 K)) |
| Solubility in acetone | 0.01 g/100g (20 °C (68 °F; 293 K)) |
| Solubility in pyridine | 1.66 g/100g |
| Vapor pressure | 0.01 hPa (20 °C (68 °F; 293 K)) |
| Acidity (pK_{a}) | 8–9 (anhydrous); 6.5–8.0 (hexahydrate) |
| Magnetic susceptibility (χ) | −5.47×10^{−5} cm^{3}/mol |
| Refractive index (n_{D}) | 1.52 |
| Viscosity | 3.34 cP (787 °C (1,449 °F; 1,060 K)); 1.44 cP (967 °C (1,773 °F; 1,240 K)) |

Structure (anhydrous, 17 °C (63 °F; 290 K))
| Crystal structure | Orthorhombic; Trigonal (hexahydrate) |
| Space group | Pnnm, No. 58 |
| Point group | 2/m 2/m 2/m |
| Lattice constant | a = 6.259 Å, b = 6.444 Å, c = 4.17 Å α = 90°, β = 90°, γ = 90° |
| Coordination geometry | Octahedral at Ca^{2+} centers |

Structure (anhydrous, >217 °C (423 °F; 490 K))
| Crystal structure | Tetragonal |
| Space group | P4_{2}/mnm, No. 136 |
| Point group | 4/m 2/m 2/m |
| Lattice constant | a = 6.379 Å, b = 6.379 Å, c = 4.193 Å α = 90°, β = 90°, γ = 90° 247 °C (477 °F; 520 K) |
| Coordination geometry | Octahedral at Ca^{2+} centers |

Thermochemistry
| Heat capacity (C) | 72.89 J/(mol·K) (anhydrous); 106.23 J/(mol·K) (monohydrate); 172.92 J/(mol·K) (dihydrate); 251.17 J/(mol·K) (tetrahydrate); 300.7 J/(mol·K) (hexahydrate) |
| Std molar entropy (S^{⦵}_{298}) | 108.4 J/(mol·K) |
| Std enthalpy of formation (Δ_{f}H^{⦵}_{298}) | −795.42 kJ/mol (anhydrous); −1,110.98 kJ/mol (monohydrate); −1,403.98 kJ/mol (dihydrate); −2,009.99 kJ/mol (tetrahydrate); −2,608.01 kJ/mol (hexahydrate) |
| Gibbs free energy (Δ_{f}G^{⦵}) | −748.81 kJ/mol |

Pharmacology
| ATC code | A12AA07 (WHO): B05XA07 (WHO); G04BA03 (WHO) |

Hazards
- Occupational safety and health (OHS/OSH)
| Main hazards | Irritant |
- GHS labelling
| Pictograms | (GHS07: Exclamation mark) |
| Signal word | Warning |
| Hazard statements | H319 |
| Precautionary statements | P264, P280, P305+P351+P338, P337+P313 |
| NFPA 704 (fire diamond) | 2 0 1 |
- Lethal dose or concentration (LD, LC)
| LD_{50} (median dose) | 1000–1400 mg/kg (rat, oral) |

Related compounds
| Other anions | Calcium fluoride; Calcium bromide; Calcium iodide |
| Other cations | Beryllium chloride; Magnesium chloride; Strontium chloride; Barium chloride; Radium chloride |
- Except where otherwise noted, data are given for materials in their standard state (at 25 °C [77 °F], 100 kPa). verify (what is ?) Infobox references

Calcium chloride is an inorganic compound, a salt with the chemical formula CaCl_{2}. The compound is a white crystalline solid at room temperature, and it is highly soluble in water. The salt can be created by neutralising hydrochloric acid with calcium hydroxide.

Calcium chloride is commonly encountered as a hydrated solid with generic formula CaCl_{2}·nH_{2}O, where n = 0, 1, 2, 4, and 6. These compounds are mainly used for de-icing and dust control. Because the anhydrous salt is hygroscopic and deliquescent, it is used as a desiccant.

== History ==
Calcium chloride was apparently discovered in the 15th century but wasn't studied properly until the 18th century. It was historically called "fixed sal ammoniac" (Latin: sal ammoniacum fixum) because it was synthesized during the distillation of ammonium chloride with lime and was nonvolatile (while the former appeared to sublime); in more modern times (18th–19th cc.) it was called "muriate of lime" (Latin: murias calcis, calcaria muriatica).

== Uses ==
=== De-icing and freezing-point depression ===
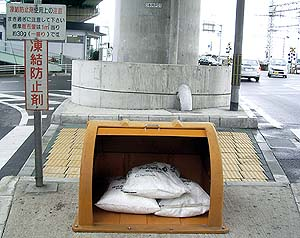
Bulk CaCl_{2} for de-icing in Japan

By depressing the freezing point of water, calcium chloride is used to prevent ice formation and is used to de-ice. This application consumes the greatest amount of calcium chloride. Calcium chloride is relatively harmless to plants and soil. As a de-icing agent, it is much more effective at lower temperatures than sodium chloride. When distributed for this use, it usually takes the form of small, white spheres a few millimeters in diameter, called prills. Solutions of calcium chloride can prevent freezing at temperatures as low as −52 °C (−62 °F), making it ideal for filling agricultural implement tires as a liquid ballast, aiding traction in cold climates.

Calcium chloride is also used in domestic and industrial chemical air dehumidifiers.

=== Road surfacing ===
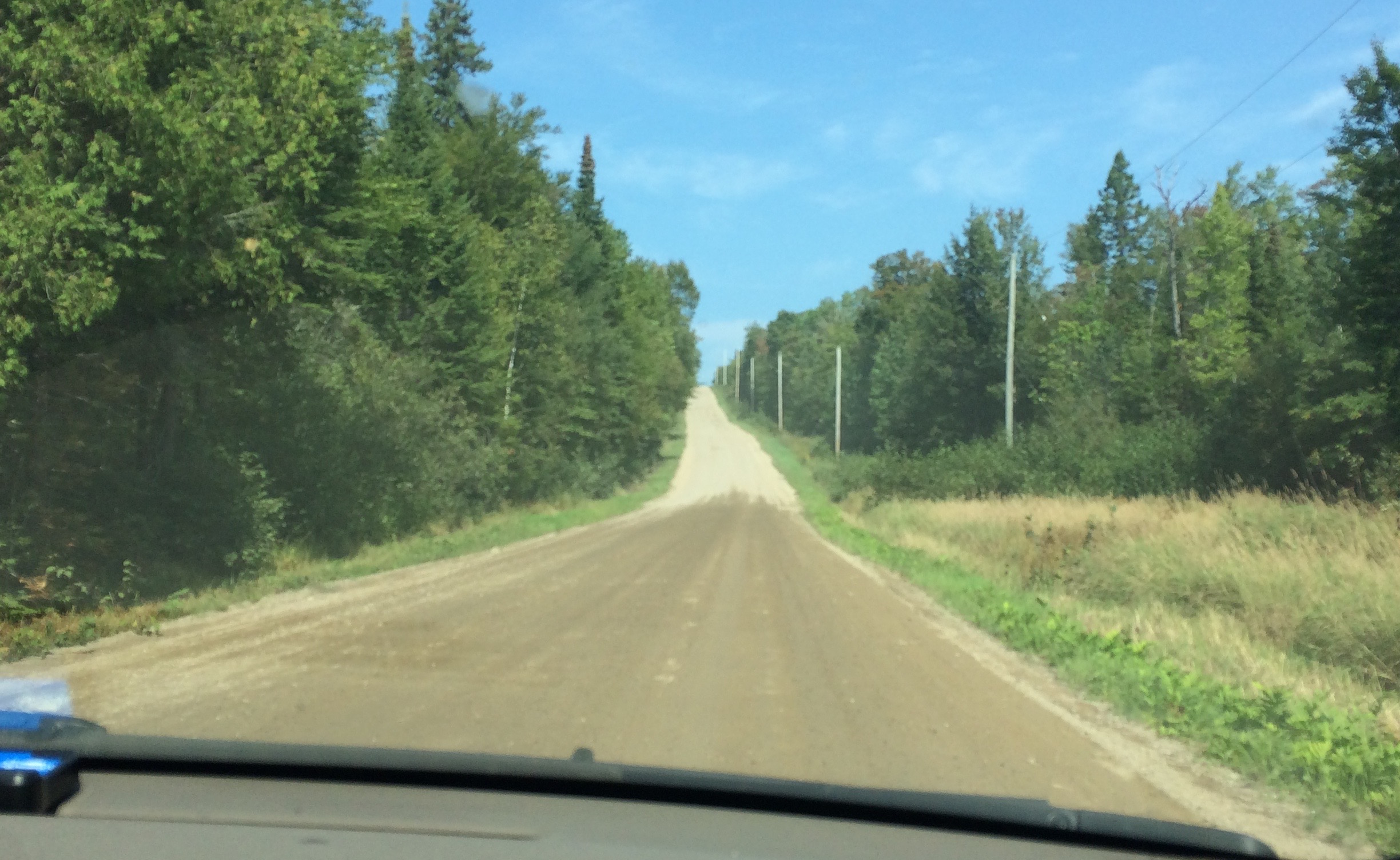
Calcium chloride was sprayed on this road to prevent weathering, giving it a wet appearance even in dry weather.

The second largest application of calcium chloride exploits its hygroscopic nature and the tackiness of its hydrates; calcium chloride is highly hygroscopic and its hydration is an exothermic process. A concentrated solution keeps a liquid layer on the surface of dirt roads, which suppresses the formation of dust. The liquid layer keeps the finer dust particles on the road, providing a cushioning layer. If these are allowed to blow away, the large aggregate begins to shift around and the road breaks down. Using calcium chloride reduces the need for grading by as much as 50% and the need for fill-in materials as much as 80%.

=== Food ===
In the food industry, calcium chloride is frequently employed as a firming agent in canned vegetables, particularly for canned tomatoes and cucumber pickles. It is also used in firming soybean curds into tofu and in producing a caviar substitute from vegetable or fruit juices. It is also used to enhance the texture of various other products, such as whole apples, whole hot peppers, whole and sliced strawberries, diced tomatoes, and whole peaches.

The firming effect of calcium chloride can be attributed to several mechanisms:

- Complexation, since calcium ions form coordination complexes with pectin, a polysaccharide found in the cell wall and middle lamella of plant tissues.
- Membrane stabilization, since calcium ions contribute to the stabilization of the cell membrane.
- Turgor pressure regulation, since calcium ions influence cell turgor pressure, which is the pressure exerted by the cell contents against the cell wall.

Calcium chloride's freezing-point depression properties are used to slow the freezing of the caramel in caramel-filled chocolate bars. Also, it is frequently added to sliced apples to maintain texture.

In brewing beer, calcium chloride is sometimes used to correct mineral deficiencies in the brewing water. It affects flavor and chemical reactions during the brewing process, and can also affect yeast function during fermentation.

In cheesemaking, calcium chloride is sometimes added to processed (pasteurized/homogenized) milk to restore the natural balance between calcium and protein in casein. The salt is added before the coagulant.

Calcium chloride is also commonly used as an electrolyte in sports drinks and other beverages; as a food additive used in conjunction with other inorganic salts it adds taste to bottled water.

The average intake of calcium chloride as food additives has been estimated to be 160–345 mg/d. Calcium chloride is permitted as a food additive in the European Union for use as a sequestrant and firming agent with the E number E509.

Calcium chloride is generally recognized as safe (GRAS) by the U.S. Food and Drug Administration. Its use in organic crop production is generally prohibited under the US National Organic Program.

Calcium chloride has a very salty taste and can cause mouth and throat irritation at high concentrations, so it is typically not the first choice for long-term oral supplementation (as a calcium supplement). Calcium chloride is highly soluble in water and efficiently absorbed from the intestine.

The dissolution of calcium chloride in water is exothermic; releasing energy as heat. If undissolved calcium chloride is ingested, this can lead to burns in the mouth, throat, esophagus, and stomach. Ingestion of large amounts of undissolved calcium chloride has been reported to result in burns, and rarely, necrosis of the stomach.

The extremely salty taste of calcium chloride is used to flavor pickles without increasing the food's sodium content.

Calcium chloride is used to prevent cork spot and bitter pit on apples by spraying on the tree during the late growing season.

=== Laboratory and related drying operations ===
Drying tubes are frequently packed with calcium chloride. Kelp is dried with calcium chloride for use in producing sodium carbonate. Anhydrous calcium chloride has been approved by the FDA as a packaging aid to ensure dryness (CPG 7117.02).

The hydrated salt can be dried for re-use but will dissolve in its own water of hydration if heated quickly and form a hard amalgamated solid when cooled.

=== Metal reduction flux ===
Similarly, CaCl_{2} is used as a flux and electrolyte in the FFC Cambridge electrolysis process for titanium production, where it ensures the proper exchange of calcium and oxygen ions between the electrodes.

=== Medical use ===
Calcium chloride infusions may be used as an intravenous therapy to prevent hypocalcemia.

Calcium chloride is a highly soluble calcium salt. Calcium chloride when taken orally completely dissociates into calcium ions (Ca^{2+}) in the gastrointestinal tract, resulting in readily bioavailable calcium. The high concentration of calcium ions allows efficient absorption in the small intestine. However, the use of calcium chloride as a source of calcium taken orally is less common compared to other calcium salts because of potential adverse effects such as gastrointestinal irritation and discomfort.

When tasted, calcium chloride exhibits a distinctive bitter flavor alongside its salty taste. The bitterness is attributable to the calcium ions and their interaction with human taste receptors: certain members of the TAS2R family of bitter taste receptors respond to calcium ions; the bitter perception of calcium is thought to be a protective mechanism to avoid ingestion of toxic substances, as many poisonous compounds taste bitter. While chloride ions (Cl^{−}) primarily contribute to saltiness, at higher concentrations, they can enhance the bitter sensation. The combination of calcium and chloride ions intensifies the overall bitterness. At lower concentrations, calcium chloride may taste predominantly salty. The salty taste arises from the electrolyte nature of the compound, similar to sodium chloride (table salt). As the concentration increases, the bitter taste becomes more pronounced: the increased presence of calcium ions enhances the activation of bitterness receptors.

=== Other applications ===
Calcium chloride is used in concrete mixes to accelerate the initial setting, but chloride ions lead to corrosion of steel rebar, so it should not be used in reinforced concrete. The anhydrous form of calcium chloride may also be used for this purpose and can provide a measure of the moisture in concrete.

Calcium chloride is included as an additive in plastics and in fire extinguishers, in blast furnaces as an additive to control scaffolding (clumping and adhesion of materials that prevent the furnace charge from descending), and in fabric softener as a thinner.

The exothermic dissolution of calcium chloride is used in self-heating cans and heating pads.

Calcium chloride is used as a water hardener in the maintenance of hot tub water, as insufficiently hard water can lead to corrosion and foaming.

In the oil industry, calcium chloride is used to increase the density of solids-free brines. The salt is also used to provide inhibition of swelling clays in the water phase of invert emulsion drilling fluids.

Calcium chloride (CaCl_{2}) acts as flux material, decreasing the melting point, in the Davy process for the industrial production of sodium metal through the electrolysis of molten NaCl.

Calcium chloride is also used in the production of activated charcoal.

Calcium chloride can be used to precipitate fluoride ions from water as insoluble CaF_{2}.

Calcium chloride is also an ingredient used in ceramic slipware. It suspends clay particles so that they float within the solution, making it easier to use in a variety of slipcasting techniques.

For watering plants to use as a fertilizer, a moderate concentration of calcium chloride is used to avoid potential toxicity: 5 to 10 mM solutions are generally effective and safe for most plants. The range is 0.55–1.11 g (0.019–0.039 oz) of anhydrous calcium chloride (CaCl_{2}) per liter of water or 1.10–2.19 g (0.039–0.077 oz) of calcium chloride hexahydrate (CaCl_{2}·6H_{2}O) per liter of water.

Calcium chloride dihydrate (20 percent by weight) dissolved in ethanol (95 percent ABV) has been used as a sterilant for male animals. The solution is injected into the testes of the animal. Within one month, necrosis of testicular tissue results in sterilization.

Cocaine producers in Colombia import tons of calcium chloride to recover solvents that are on the INCB Red List and are more tightly controlled.

== Hazards ==
Although the salt is non-toxic in small quantities when wet, the strongly hygroscopic properties of non-hydrated calcium chloride present some hazards. The compound can act as an irritant by desiccating moist skin. Solid calcium chloride dissolves exothermically, and burns can result in the mouth and esophagus if it is ingested. Ingestion of concentrated solutions or solid products may cause gastrointestinal irritation or ulceration.

Consumption of calcium chloride can lead to hypercalcemia.

== Properties ==
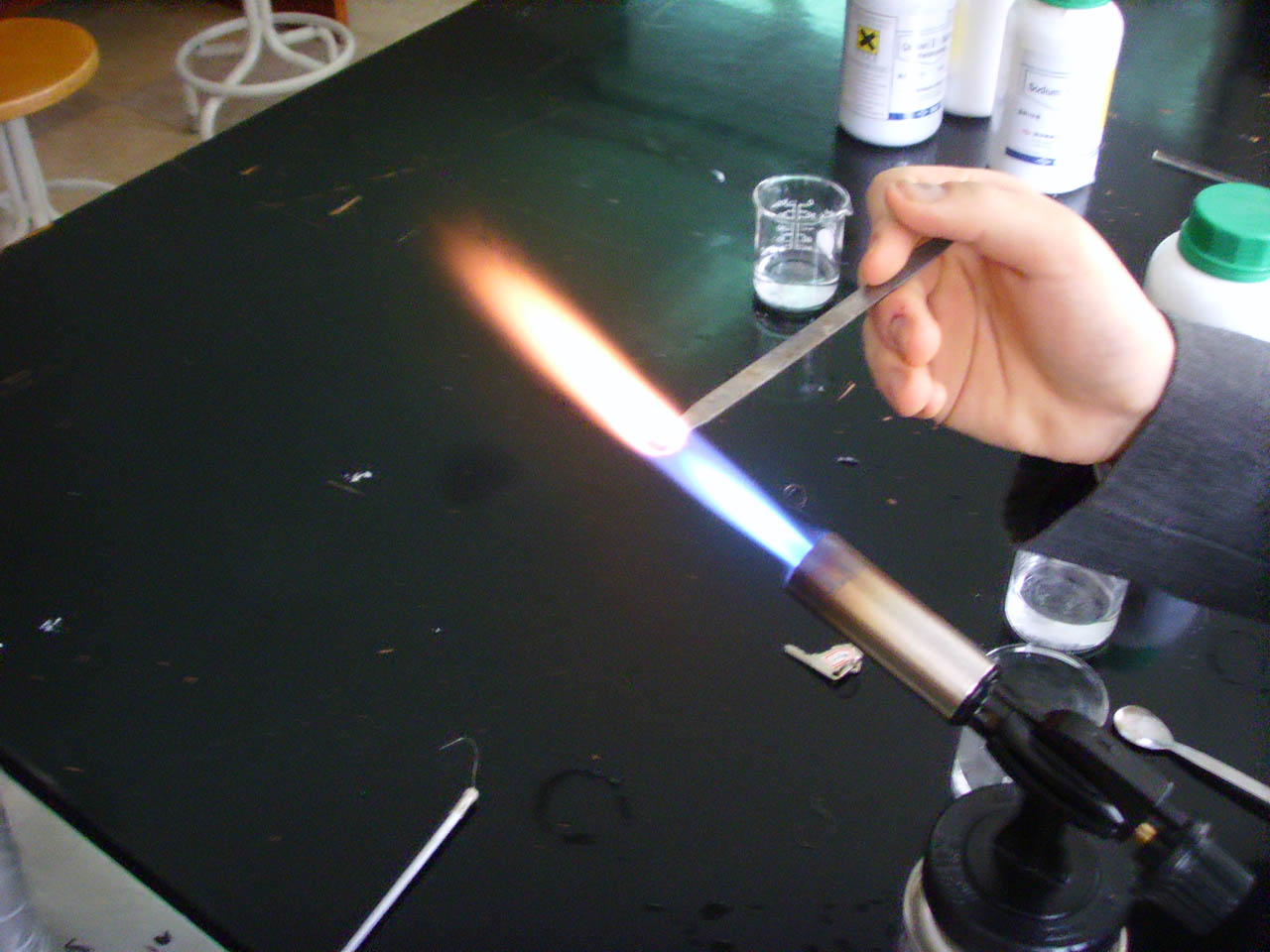
Flame test of CaCl_{2}

Calcium chloride dissolves in water, producing chloride and the aquo complex [Ca(H_{2}O)_{6}]^{2+}. In this way, these solutions are sources of "free" calcium and free chloride ions. This description is illustrated by the fact that these solutions react with phosphate sources to give a solid precipitate of calcium phosphate:

3 CaCl_{2} + 2 PO^{3−}_{4} → Ca_{3}(PO_{4})_{2} + 6 Cl^{−}

Calcium chloride has a very high enthalpy change of solution, indicated by considerable temperature rise accompanying dissolution of the anhydrous salt in water. This property is the basis for its largest-scale application.

Aqueous solutions of calcium chloride tend to be slightly acidic due to the influence of the chloride ions on the hydrogen ion concentration in water. The slight acidity of calcium chloride solutions is primarily due to the increased ionic strength of the solution, which can influence the activity of hydrogen ions and lower the pH slightly. The pH of calcium chloride in aqueous solution is the following:

Calcium chloride pH in aqueous solution
| Concentration (mol/L) | Approximate pH |
|---|---|
| 0.01 | 6.5 – 7.0 |
| 0.1 | 6.0 – 6.5 |
| 1.0 | 5.5 – 6.0 |

Molten calcium chloride can be electrolysed to give calcium metal and chlorine gas:

CaCl_{2} → Ca + Cl_{2}

== Preparation ==
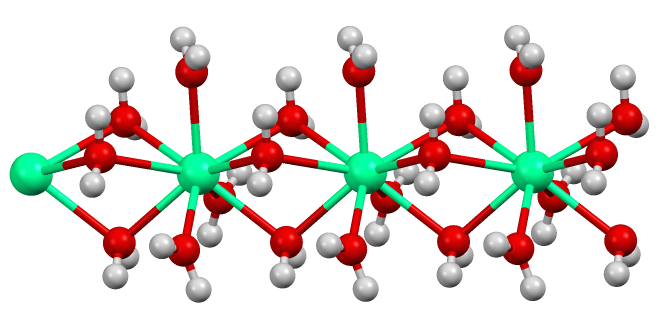
Structure of the polymeric [Ca(H_{2}O)_{6}]^{2+} center in crystalline calcium chloride hexahydrate, illustrating the high coordination number typical for calcium complexes.

In much of the world, calcium chloride is derived from limestone as a by-product of the Solvay process, which follows the net reaction below:

2 NaCl + CaCO_{3} → Na_{2}CO_{3} + CaCl_{2}

North American consumption in 2002 was 1,529,000 t (3.371×10^{9} lb). In the US, most calcium chloride is obtained by purification from brine. As with most bulk commodity salt products, trace amounts of other cations from the alkali metals and alkaline earth metals (groups 1 and 2) and other anions from the halogens (group 17) typically occur.

=== Occurrence ===
Calcium chloride occurs as the rare evaporite minerals sinjarite (dihydrate) and antarcticite (hexahydrate). Another natural hydrate known is ghiaraite – a tetrahydrate. The related minerals chlorocalcite (potassium calcium chloride, KCaCl_{3}) and tachyhydrite (calcium magnesium chloride, CaMg_{2}Cl_{6}·12H_{2}O) are also very rare. The same is true for rorisite, CaClF (calcium chloride fluoride).

== See also ==
- Calcium(I) chloride
- Calcium chloride transformation
- Magnesium chloride
- Calcium supplement
