= Calcium nitrite =

Names
- Other names calcium dinitrite, Caswell No. 147, Nitrous acid calcium salt (2:1)

Identifiers
CAS Number	13780-06-8
3D model (JSmol)	Interactive image
ChemSpider	140414
ECHA InfoCard	100.034.008
EC Number	237-424-2
PubChem CID	159695
UNII	F538343O0T
CompTox Dashboard (EPA)	DTXSID6065634
- InChI: InChI=1S/Ca.2HNO2/c;2*2-1-3/h;2*(H,2,3)/q+2;;/p-2 Key: AONJRPXZCVADKF-UHFFFAOYSA-L
- SMILES: N(=O)[O-].N(=O)[O-].[Ca+2]

Properties
Chemical formula	Ca(NO_{2})_{2}
Density	2.26 g/cm^{3}
Melting point	390 °C (734 °F; 663 K)

Hazards
- GHS labelling
Pictograms	(GHS03: Oxidizing) (GHS06: Toxic) (GHS07: Exclamation mark) (GHS08: Health hazard) (GHS09: Environmental hazard)
Signal word	Danger
Hazard statements	H272, H301, H302, H311, H319, H340, H361, H371, H372, H373, H410
Precautionary statements	P201, P202, P210, P220, P221, P260, P264, P270, P273, P280, P281, P301+P310, P301+P312, P302+P352, P305+P351+P338, P308+P313, P309+P311, P312, P314, P321, P322, P330, P337+P313, P361, P363, P370+P378, P391, P405, P501
- Except where otherwise noted, data are given for materials in their standard state (at 25 °C [77 °F], 100 kPa). Infobox references

Calcium nitrite is an inorganic compound with the chemical formula Ca(NO_{2})_{2}. In this compound, as in all nitrites, nitrogen is in a +3 oxidation state. It has many applications such as antifreeze, rust inhibitor of steel and wash heavy oil.

== Properties ==
At room temperature and pressure, the compound is an odorless white or light yellowish powder. It is freely soluble in water with a density of 2.26 g/cm^{3}. Its melting point is of 390 °C and it is stable under ordinary conditions of use and storage. It is also characterized for its strong oxidizing character, which arises from the nitrite anion.

== Synthesis ==
Calcium nitrite can be produced by different synthesis processes. One is by reacting hydrated lime with NOX gas, which typically comes from a nitric acid plant. At the acid plant, ammonia is burned to produce the NO_{X} gas for acid as well as calcium nitrite.

Also, it can be prepared as detailed below, forming a solution of sodium nitrite and calcium nitrate; cooling the solution to precipitate sodium nitrate; forming a double salt of calcium nitrite/calcium hydroxide; and in the presence of water, decomposing double salt to form a solution of calcium nitrite and insolubilize calcium hydroxide. Essentially the function of calcium hydroxide is to carry calcium nitrite; calcium hydroxide forms the insolubilized double salt which can be used to separate from calcium nitrite portions from the solution. After, the double salt is dissolved liberating calcium nitrite and regenerating the calcium hydroxide.

1. Precipitation of double salt

Ca(NO_{2})_{2} + Ca(OH)_{2} + H_{2}O → Ca(NO_{2})_{2}•Ca(OH)_{2}•H_{2}O

2. Liberation of calcium nitrite

Ca(NO_{2})_{2}•Ca(OH)_{2}•H_{2}O--H_{2}O → Ca(NO_{2})_{2}(aq) + Ca(OH)_{2} + H_{2}O

== Uses ==
Calcium nitrite has a great variety of uses. It can be use as antifreeze due to its high solubility, either in solution or powder. It can promote the hydration of minerals in cement using this antifreeze at sub freezing temperature, the operative temperature can be reduced to −20 °C. It also work as metal corrosion inhibitor, so it can protect steel in concrete buildings and structures from rust, to extend life of specific buildings. Nitrite's success as a corrosion inhibitor for the protection of embedded steel in reinforced concrete comes from the "smart" behavior of the AFm phase (AFm is shorthand for a family of hydrated calcium aluminate hydrate phases: aluminate-ferrite-monosubstituent phases); normally it stores nitrite in preference to sulfate, carbonate, and hydroxyl ions so that the nitrite concentrations of pore fluid are low. However, if chloride ingress occurs in service (from sea water or de-icing salt), the AFm undergoes ion exchange, gaining chloride and forming Friedel's salt (Cl-AFm), while releasing soluble nitrite ions to the pore fluid. As a result, the aqueous ratio of [NO_{2}^{−}]/[Cl^{−}] increases which assures corrosion inhibition of embedded steel. The corrosion inhibition mechanism of nitrite in concrete is twofold: on one hand, the concentration of the very corrosive chloride anions (responsible for the pitting corrosion of steel rebars) in the concrete pore water decreases after their uptake into the AFm phases and on the other hand, nitrites also oxidize the Fe^{2+} ions present around the corroding rebars leading to the precipitation of poorly soluble iron oxy-hydroxides onto the steel surface contributing to its passivation.

Calcium nitrite is widely used in concrete for high-rise construction, highways, bridges, railroads, airports, and large-scale hydraulics. It also might enable coastal areas to use chloride-containing sea sand in concrete.

Calcium nitrite is also used as a heavy oil detergent and in pharmaceuticals, dyes and metallurgy industries. It can substitute for sodium nitrite, a product often used as a heat transfer fluid in thermal energy storage units for large air-conditioning or process cooling applications.

== Safety ==
It is a poisonous inorganic oxidiser, which can not be mixed with organic ammonium salt, acid or cyanide. It has to be kept in heat-proof place, because when the temperature is higher than 220 °C it will reduce and decompose into nitrous oxide. During transportation it is important to protect it from rain and insolation, and protect its package from breakage. Also, the warehouse should be ventilated and dry.

== See also ==
- Calcium nitrate
