= Well cementing =

Well cementing is the process of introducing cement to the annular space between a well-bore and its casing or to the annular space between two successive casing strings. Personnel who conduct this job are called cementers.

== Cementing Principle ==
Well cementing has several purposes, including:

1. to support the vertical and radial loads applied to the casing,
2. to isolate porous formations from the producing zone formations,
3. to exclude unwanted sub-surface fluids from the producing interval,
4. to protect the casing from corrosion,
5. to resist the chemical deterioration of cement,
6. to confine abnormal pore pressure, and
7. to increase the possibility to hit the target.

Cement is introduced into the well by means of a cementing head. It helps in pumping cement between the running of the top and bottom plugs.

The most important function of cementing is to achieve zonal isolation. Another purpose of cementing is to achieve a good cement-to-pipe bond. An effective confining pressure that is too low may cause the cement to become ductile.

For cement, there is no correlation between the shear and compressive strength. Cement strength ranges between 1,000 and 1,800 psi (6,900 and 12,400 kPa), and for reservoir pressures above 1000 psi, this means that the pipe cement bond will fail first. This would lead to the development of micro-annuli along the pipe.

== Cement Classes ==
A: 0–6,000 feet (0–1,800 m); used when special properties are not required.

B: 0–6,000 feet (0–1,800 m); used when conditions require moderate to high sulfate resistance

C: 0–6,000 feet (0–1,800 m); used when conditions require high early strength

D: 6,000–10,000 feet (1,800–3,000 m); used under moderately high temperatures and pressures

E: 10,000–14,000 feet (3,000–4,300 m); used under conditions of high temperatures and pressures

F: 10,000–16,000 feet (3,000–4,900 m); used under conditions of extremely high temperatures and pressures

G: 0–8,000 feet (0–2,400 m); can be used with accelerators and retarders to cover a wide range of well depths and temperatures

H: 0–8,000 feet (0–2,400 m); can be used with accelerators and retarders to cover a wide range of well depths and temperatures

J: 12,000–16,000 feet (3,700–4,900 m); can be used under conditions of extremely high temperatures and pressures or can be mixed with accelerators and retarders to cover a range of well depth and temperatures

API cement grades A, B, and C correspond to ASTM type I, II, and III.

== Cement parameters ==
Factors affecting cement include:

- Particle size distribution
- Distribution of silicate and aluminate phases
- Reactivity of hydrating phases
- Gypsum/hemihydrates ratio and total sulphate content
- Free alkali content
- Chemical nature, quantity, and specific surface area of initial hydration products

Given the multitude of cement parameters, the best and most thorough and practical method of designing a cement blend is through laboratory testing. The tests should be conducted on a sample that represents the cement to be used on the job site.

== Additives and mechanism of action ==
There are 8 general categories of additives:

1. Accelerators reduce setting time and increases the rate of compressive strength build up.
2. Retarders extend the setting time.
3. Extenders lower the density
4. Weighting agents increase density.
5. Dispersants reduce viscosity.
6. Fluid loss control agents.
7. Lost circulation control agents.
8. Specialty agents.

=== Accelerators ===
Accelerators can be added to shorten the setting time or to accelerate the hardening process.

Calcium chloride (CaCl_{2}), under the right conditions, tends to improve the compressive strength and significantly reduces the thickening and setting time. It is used in concentrations of up to 4.0%. The mechanism of this process is debated, but there are four major theories put forward:

1. It affects the hydration phase by one of the following theories:
  1. Chlorine (Cl^{−}) ions enhance the formation of ettingite (crystalline).
  2. Increases the hydration of aluminate phase/gypsum system.
  3. Accelerates the hydration of 3CaO·SiO_{2} (in cement chemist notation, C_{3}S).
2. Changes the calcium-silicate-hydrate (C-S-H) structure.
  1. Controls the diffusion of water and ionic species.
  2. C-S-H gel has a higher area and will react faster.
3. Diffusion of the chloride ions;
  1. Cl^{−} ions diffuse into the C-S-H gel faster; this process produces the precipitation of portlandite sooner.
  2. The smaller size of the Cl^{−} ions causes a greater tendency to diffuse into the C-S-H membrane. Eventually, the C-S-H membrane bursts and the hydration process is accelerated.
  3. Changes the aqueous phase composition.

Calcium chloride also produces a high amount of heat during hydration. This heat could accelerate the hydration process. This heat causes the casing to expand and contract as it dissipates. The differing rates of expansion and contraction could result in the casing pulling away from the cement and lead to the formation of micro-annuli. It also has the ability to affect the cement rheology and the compressive strength development, to produce shrinkage by 10–15%, to increase the permeability with time, and to lower the sulphate resistance.

=== Retarders ===
They work by one of 4 main theories:

1. Adsorption theory: the retarder is adsorbed and inhibits water content.
2. Precipitation theory: it reacts with the aqueous phase to form an impermeable and insoluble layer around the cement grains.
3. Nucleation theory: the retarder poisons the hydration product and prevents future growth.
4. Complexation theory: Ca^{+} ions are chelated by the retarder, so that a nucleus cannot be properly formed.

Retarders include:

- Lignosulphonates are wood-pulp-derived polymers. They are effective in all Portland cements and are added in concentrations of 0.1–1.5% BWOC. It absorbs into the C-S-H gel and causes a change of morphology to a more impermeable structure.
- Hydroxycarboxylic acids have hydroxyl and carboxyl groups in their molecular structures. Below 93 °C, they can cause over-retardation. They are efficient to a temperature of 150 °C. One acid used is citric acid with an effective concentration of 0.1–0.3% BWOC.
- Saccharide compounds: sugars are excellent retarders of Portland cement. Such compounds are not commonly used due to the degree of retardation being very sensitive to variation of concentration. It also depends on the compound's susceptibility to alkaline hydrolysis.
- Cellulose derivatives are polysaccharides derived from wood or vegetable matter, and are stable to the alkali conditions of the cement slurry.
- Organophosphates are alkylene phosphonic acids.
- Inorganic compounds used as retarders include acids and accompanying salts, sodium chloride (used in concentrations of up to 5.0% and with bottom hole temperatures less than 160 °F (71 °C) to improve compressive strength and reduce thickening and setting time), and oxides of zinc and lead.

=== Extenders ===
Extenders reduce slurry density, and thereby reduce hydrostatic pressure during cementing. They also increases slurry yield, thus reducing the amount of cement required to produce a given volume.

- Water extenders allow the addition of water to help extend the cement slurry.
- Low-density aggregates are materials with densities less than Portland cement (3.15 g/cm^{3})
- Hollow glass microspheres are engineered high-strength, low-density (down to 0.3 g/cm^{3} for the medium-strength versions), non-porous hollow glass spheres, usually below 40 μm in average particle size; they enable hydraulic cement slurries as low as 960 kg/m^{3}.
- Gaseous extenders include nitrogen or air and can be used to prepare foam.
- Clays: hydrous aluminum silicates. The most common is bentonite (85% mineral clay smectite). They can be used to obtain a cement of density 11.5 to 15.0 ppg, with concentrations up to 20%. They are used with an API ratio of 5.3% water to 1.0% bentonite.
- Bentonite is added in conjunction with additional water. It is used for specific weight control but makes poor cement.
- Pozzolan is finely-ground pumice or fly ash. Pozzolan costs very little, but does not achieve much weight reduction of the slurry.
- Diatomaceous earth earth has properties similar to those of bentonite, and also requires additional water to be added.
- Silica is used in the form of α quartz and condensed silica fume. α quartz is used to prevent strength retrogression in thermal wells. Silica fume (micro fume) is highly reactive, and is regarded as the most effective pozzolanic material available. The high surface area increases the water demand to get pumpable slurry. Such a mixture can produce a cement slurry as low as 11.0 ppg. Normal concentrations are about 15% BWOC but can be as high as 28% BWOC. It can sometimes be used to prevent annular fluid migration.
- Expanded perlite is used to reduce weight as water is added with its addition. Without bentonite, the perlite separates and floats to the upper part of the slurry. It can be used to achieve a slurry weight as low as 12.0 ppg. Bentonite in concentrations of 2–4% is also added to prevent segregation of particles and slurry.
- Gilsonite is used to obtain slurry weights as low as 12.0 ppg. In high concentrations, mixing is a problem.
- Powdered coal can be used to obtain a slurry with a density as low as 11.9 ppg. 12.5–25 pounds (5.7–11.3 kg) per sack are usually added.

=== Other additives ===
- Particulate additives can be used with latex additives to achieve fluid loss. Emulsion polymers are supplied as suspensions of polymer particles. They contain about 50% solids. Such particles can physically plug the pores in the filter cake.
- Water-soluble polymers they increase the viscosity of the aqueous phase and decrease the filter cake permeability.
- Organic proteins (polypeptides) can be used up to 93 °C.
- Non-ionic synthetic polymers can lower fluid loss rates from 500 ml/30 min to 20 ml/30 min. There are also anionic synthetic polymers and cationic polymers.
- Bridging agents are materials that can physically bridge fractured or weak zones. Examples include gilsonite and cellophane flakes added in quantities of 0.125–0.500 lbs/sack.
- Thixotropic cements are cement slurries that, upon entering the formation, begin to gel and eventually become self-supporting.
