= Office =

Room where administrative work is performed

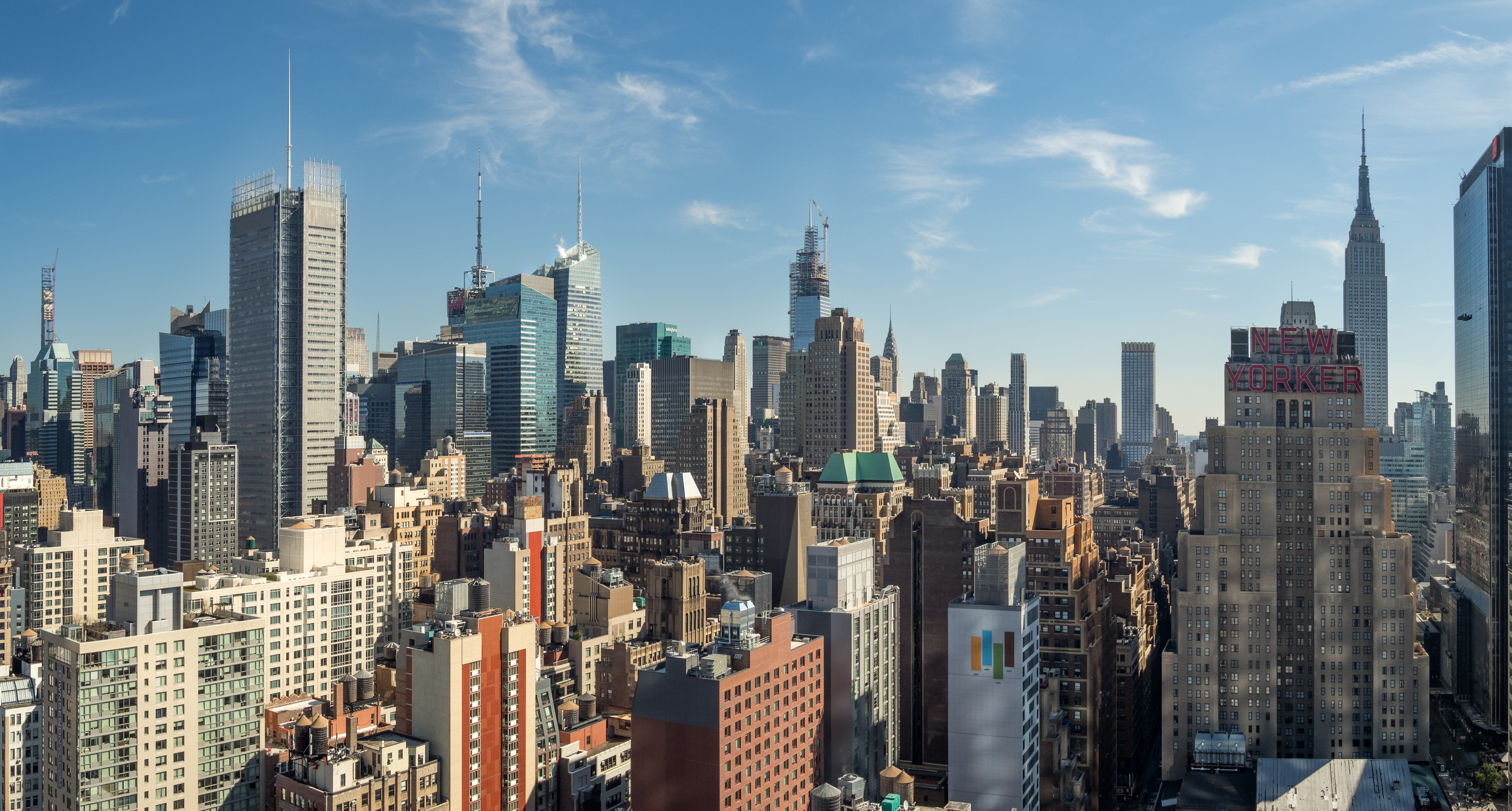
Midtown Manhattan in New York City is the largest central business district in the world, comprising over 350 million square feet of office space.

An office is a space where the members of an organization perform administrative work in order to support and realize the various goals of the organization. The word "office" may also denote a position within an organization with specific duties attached to it (see officer or official); the latter is an earlier usage, as "office" originally referred to the location of one's duty. In its adjective form, the term "office" may refer to business-related tasks. In law, a company or organization has offices in any place where it has an official presence, even if that presence consists of a storage silo. For example, instead of a more traditional establishment with a desk and chair, an office is also an architectural and design phenomenon, including small offices, such as a bench in the corner of a small business or a room in someone's home, entire floors of buildings, and massive buildings dedicated entirely to one company. In modern terms, an office is usually the location where white-collar workers carry out their functions.

In classical antiquity, offices were often part of a palace complex or a large temple. In the High Middle Ages (1000–1300), the medieval chancery acted as a sort of office, serving as the space where records and laws were stored and copied. With the growth of large, complex organizations in the 18th century, the first purpose-built office spaces were constructed. As the Industrial Revolution intensified in the 18th and 19th centuries, the industries of banking, rail, insurance, retail, petroleum, and telegraphy grew dramatically, requiring many clerks. As a result, more office space was assigned to house their activities. The time-and-motion study, pioneered in manufacturing by F. W. Taylor (1856–1915), led to the "Modern Efficiency Desk" of 1915. Its flat top, with drawers below, was designed to allow managers an easy view of their workers. By the middle of the 20th century, it became apparent that an efficient office required additional control over privacy, and gradually the cubicle system evolved.

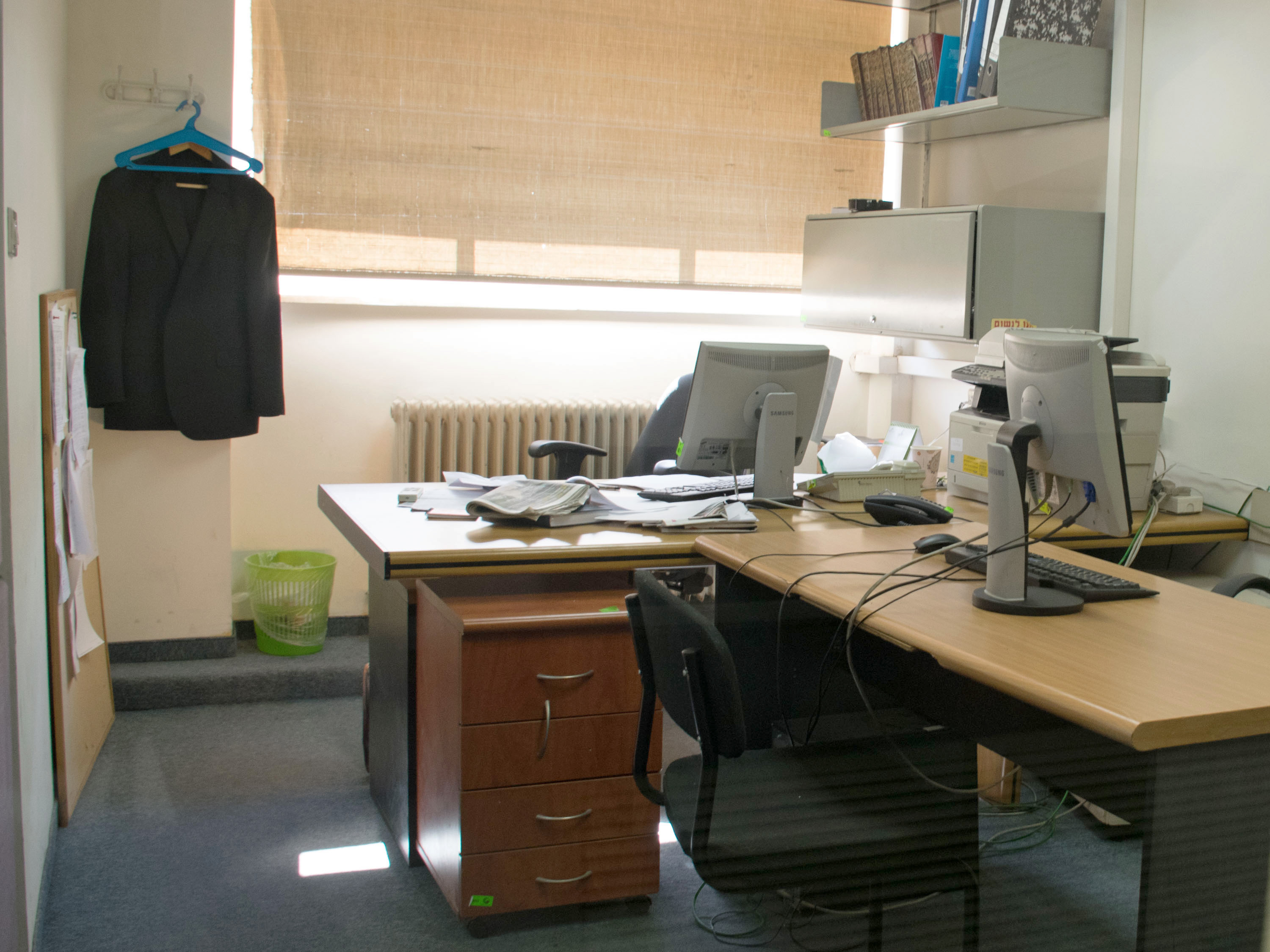
A typical modern office, in Israel

== History ==
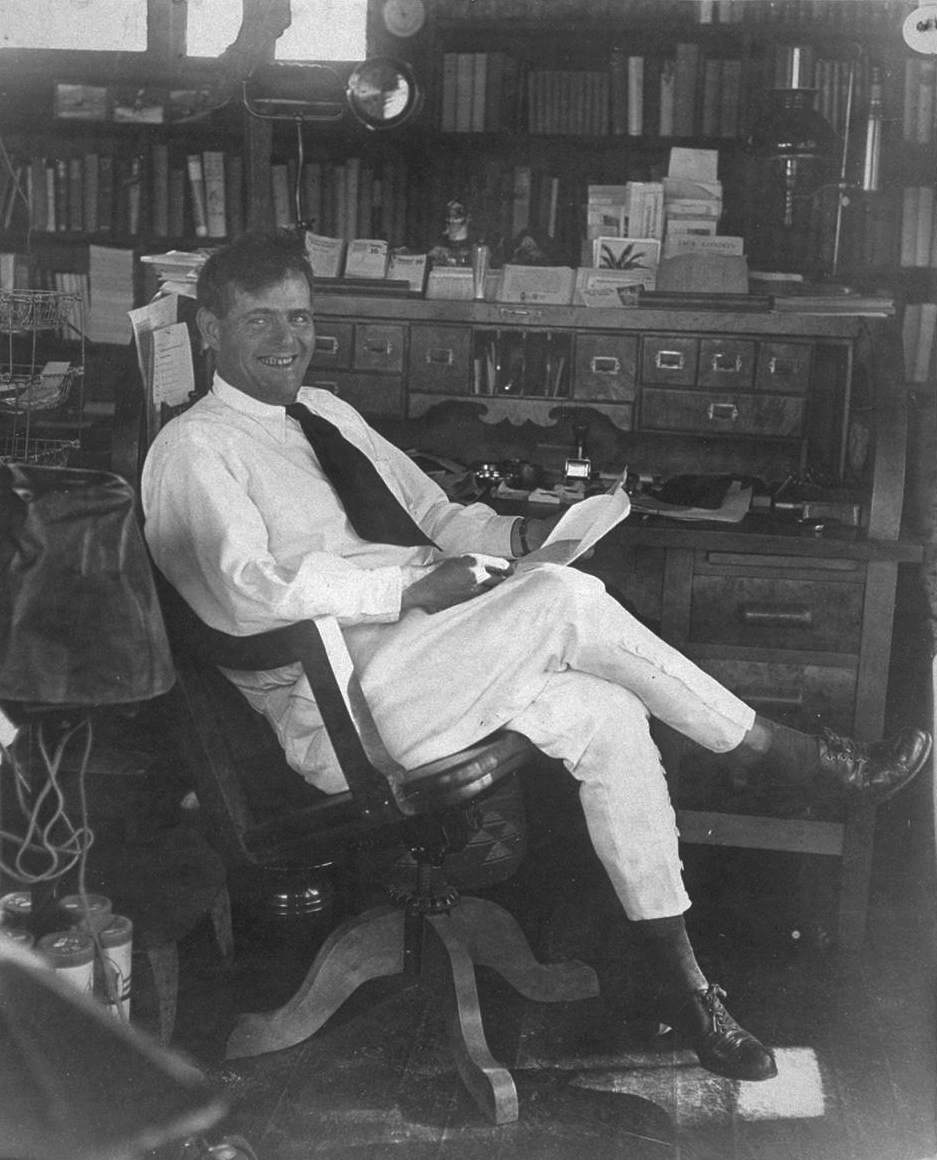
Jack London in his office, 1916

The word "office" stems from the Latin "officium" and its equivalents in various Romance languages. An officium was not necessarily a place, but often referred instead to human staff members of an organization, or even the abstract notion of a formal position like a magistrate. The elaborate Roman bureaucracy would not be equaled for centuries in the West after the fall of Rome, with areas partially reverting to illiteracy. Further east, the Byzantine Empire and varying Islamic caliphates preserved a more sophisticated administrative culture.

Offices in classical antiquity were often part of a palace complex or a large temple. There was often a room where scrolls were kept and scribes did their work. Ancient texts mentioning the work of scribes allude to the existence of such "offices". These rooms are sometimes called "libraries" by some archaeologists because of scrolls' association with literature. They were, however, closer to modern offices because the scrolls were meant for record-keeping and other management functions, not for poetry or works of fiction.

=== Middle Ages ===
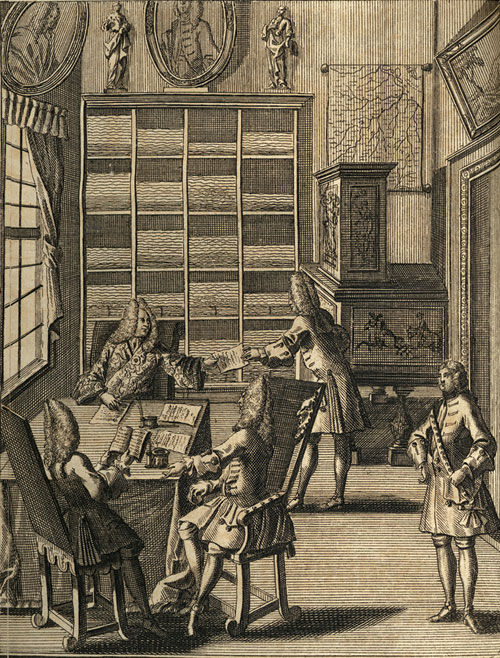
An early European office, 1719

The High Middle Ages (1000–1300) saw the rise of the medieval chancery, which was the place where most government letters were written and laws were copied within a kingdom. The rooms of the chancery often had walls full of pigeonholes, constructed to hold rolled-up pieces of parchment for safekeeping or ready reference. This kind of structure was a precursor to the modern bookshelf. The introduction of the printing press during the Renaissance did not impact the setup and function of these government offices significantly.

Medieval paintings and tapestries often show people in their private offices handling record-keeping books or writing on scrolls of parchment. Before the invention of the printing press and its wider distribution, there was often no clear cultural distinction between a private office and a private library; books were both read and written at the same desk or table, as were personal and professional accounts and letters.

During the 13th century, the English word "office" first began to appear when referring to a position involving specific professional duties (for example, "the office of the....") Geoffrey Chaucer appears to have first used the word in 1395 to mean a place where business is transacted in The Canterbury Tales.

As mercantilism became the dominant economic theory of the Renaissance, merchants tended to conduct their business in buildings that also sometimes housed people doing retail sales, warehousing, and clerical work. During the 15th century, the population density in many cities reached a point where merchants began to use stand-alone buildings to conduct their businesses. A distinction began to develop between religious, administrative/military, and commercial uses for buildings.

=== The emergence of the modern office ===
The first purpose-built office spaces were constructed in the 18th century to suit the needs of large and growing organizations such as the Royal Navy and the East India Company. The Old Admiralty (Ripley Building) was built in 1726 and was the first purpose-built office building in Great Britain. As well as offices, the building housed a board room and apartments for the Lords of the Admiralty. In the 1770s, many scattered offices for the Royal Navy were gathered into Somerset House, the first block purpose-built for office work.

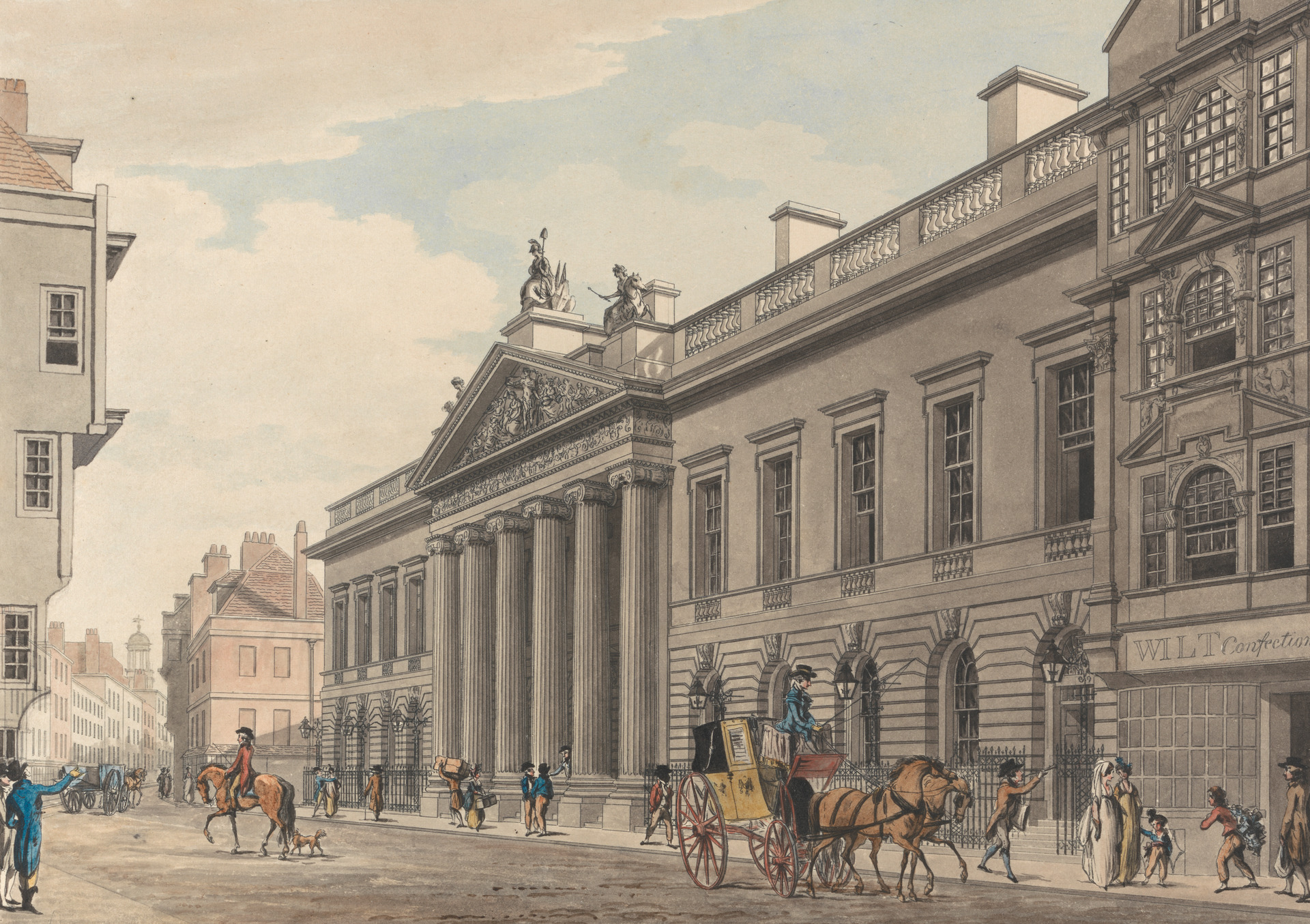
The sprawling complex of the extended East India House c. 1800. The company employed a plethora of bureaucrats to administer its territories in India.

The East India House was built in 1729 on Leadenhall Street as the headquarters from which the East India Company administered its Indian colonial possessions. The Company developed a very complex bureaucracy for the task, necessitating thousands of office employees to process the required paperwork. The Company recognized the benefits of centralized administration and required that all workers sign in and out at the central office each day.

As the Industrial Revolution intensified in the 18th and 19th centuries, the industries of banking, rail, insurance, retail, petroleum, and telegraphy dramatically grew in size and complexity. Increasingly large number of clerks were needed to handle order processing, accounting, and document filing, and these clerks needed to be housed in increasingly specialized spaces. Most of the desks of the era were top-heavy and had a cubicle-like appearance, with paper storage bins extending above the desk-work area, offering workers some degree of privacy.

The relatively high price of land in the central core of cities led to the first multi-story buildings, which were limited to about 10 stories until the use of iron and steel allowed for higher structures. The first purpose-built office block was the Brunswick Building, built in Liverpool in 1841. The invention of the safety elevator in 1852 by Elisha Otis enabled the rapid upward escalation of buildings. By the end of the 19th century, larger office buildings frequently contained large glass atriums to allow light into the complex and improve air circulation.

=== 20th century ===
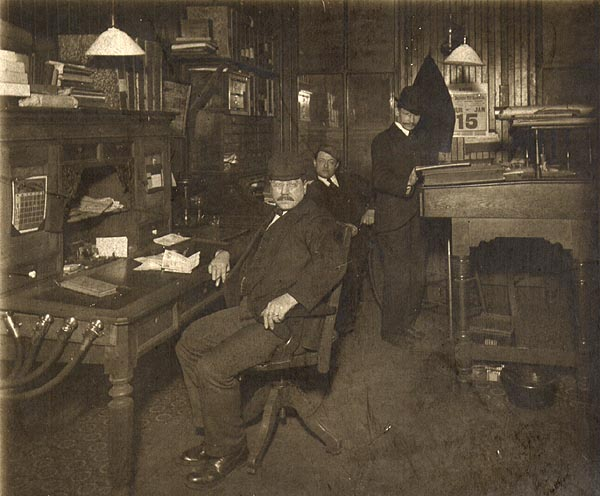
An office in 1903, equipped with speaking tubes

By 1906, Sears, Roebuck, and Co. had opened their headquarters operation in a 3,000,000-square-foot (280,000 m^{2}) building in Chicago, at the time the largest building in the world. The time and motion study, pioneered in manufacturing by F. W. Taylor and later applied to the office environment by Frank and Lillian Gilbreth, led to the idea that managers needed to play an active role in directing the work of subordinates to increase the efficiency of the workplace. F.W. Taylor advocated the use of large, open floor plans and desks that faced supervisors. As a result, in 1915, the Equitable Life Insurance Company in New York City introduced the "Modern Efficiency Desk" with a flat top and drawers below, designed to allow managers an easy view of the workers. This led to a demand for large square footage per floor in buildings, and a return to the open spaces that were seen in pre–industrial revolution buildings.

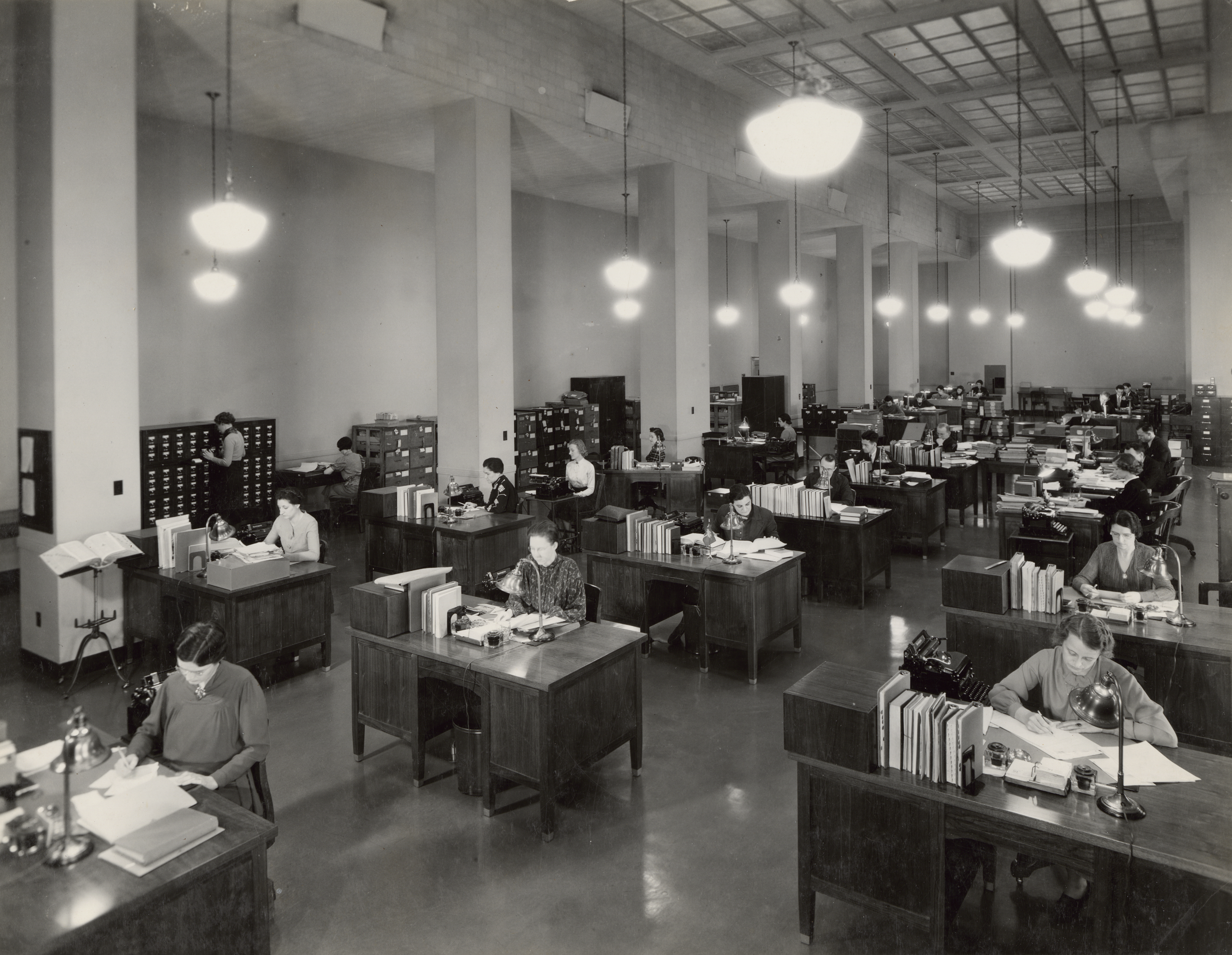
1937 image of the Division of Classification and Cataloging, National Archives, United States

However, by the midpoint of the 20th century, it became apparent that an efficient office required more privacy in order to combat tedium, increase productivity, and encourage creativity. In 1964, the Herman Miller (office equipment) company contracted Robert Propst, a prolific industrial designer. Propst came up with the concept of the Action Office, which later evolved into the cubicle office furniture system.

Offices in Japan have developed unique characteristics partly as a result of the country's unique business culture. Japanese offices tend to follow open plan layouts in an 'island-style' arrangement, which promotes teamwork and top-down management. They also use uchi-awase (informal meetings) and ringi-sho (consensus systems) to encourage input on policies from as many groups throughout the office as possible.

== Office spaces ==
The main purpose of an office environment is to support its occupants in performing their jobs—preferably at minimum cost and with maximum satisfaction. Different people performing different tasks will require different office spaces, or spaces that can handle a variety of uses. To aid decision-making in workplace and office design, one can distinguish three different types of office spaces: workspaces, meeting spaces, and support spaces. For new or developing businesses, remote satellite offices and project rooms, or serviced offices, can provide a simple solution and provide all of the former types of space.

=== Workspaces ===
Workspaces in an office are typically used for conventional office activities such as reading, writing, and computer work.

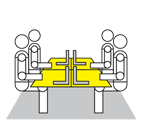
Open office

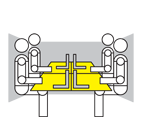
Team space

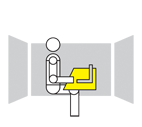
Cubicle

Open office: an open workspace for more than ten people; suitable for activities that demand frequent communication or routine activities that need relatively little concentration.

Team space: a semi-enclosed workspace for two to eight people; suitable for teamwork which demands frequent internal communication and a medium level of concentration.

Cubicle: a semi-enclosed workspace for one person; suitable for activities that demand medium concentration and medium interaction.

Office Pod: for fostering privacy in open-plan offices. It provides a cost-effective way to ensure privacy and continuity during conversations, calls, and video conferences.

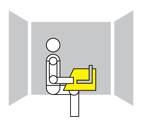
Private office

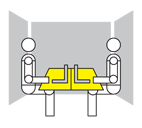
Shared office

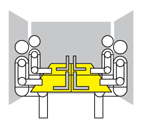
Team room

Private office: an enclosed workspace for one person; suitable for activities that are confidential, demand a lot of concentration, or include many small meetings.

Shared office: a compact, semi-private workspace designed for two or three individuals, facilitating both focused work and small group collaboration.

Team room: an enclosed workspace for four to ten people; suitable for teamwork that may be confidential and demands frequent internal communication.

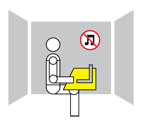
Study booth

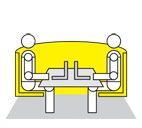
Work lounge

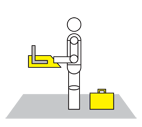
Touch down

Study booth: an enclosed workspace for one person; suitable for short-term activities that demand concentration or confidentiality. Also termed an alonement space, it is designed for individual uninterrupted work and solitude. The spaces are akin to smoke break areas. Alonement spaces are a response to the rise of open plan offices.

Work lounge: a lounge-like workspace for two to six people; suitable for short-term activities that demand collaboration and/or allow impromptu interaction.

Touch down: an open workspace for one person; suitable for short-term activities that require little concentration and low interaction.

=== Meeting spaces ===
Meeting spaces in an office typically use interactive processes, be they quick conversations or intensive brainstorming.

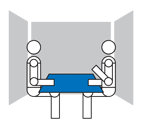
Small meeting room

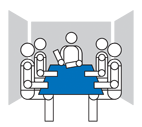
Large meeting room

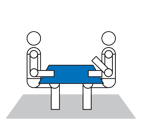
Small meeting space

Small meeting room: an enclosed meeting space for two to four people; suitable for both formal and informal interaction.

Medium meeting room: an enclosed meeting space for four to ten people; suitable for both formal and informal interaction.

Large meeting room: an enclosed meeting space for ten or more people; suitable for formal interaction.

Small meeting space: an open or semi-open meeting space for two to four persons; suitable for short, informal interaction.

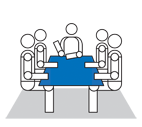
Large meeting space

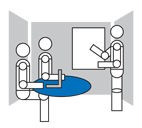
Brainstorm room

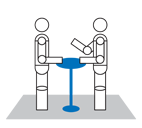
Meeting point

Medium meeting space: an open or semi-open meeting space for four to ten persons; suitable for short, informal interaction.

Large meeting space: an open or semi-open meeting space for ten or more people people; suitable for short, informal interaction.

Brainstorm room: an enclosed meeting space for five to twelve people; suitable for brainstorming sessions and workshops.

Meeting point: an open meeting point for two to four people; suitable for ad hoc, informal meetings.

=== Support spaces ===
Support spaces in an office are typically used for secondary activities such as filing documents or taking breaks.

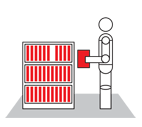
Filing space

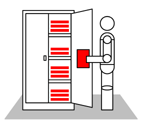
Storage room

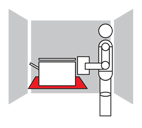
Print and copy area

Filing space: an open or enclosed support space for the storage of frequently used files and documents.

Storage room: an open or enclosed support space for the storage of commonly used office supplies.

Print and copy area: an open or enclosed support space with facilities for printing, scanning and copying.

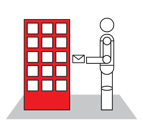
Mail room

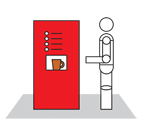
Pantry

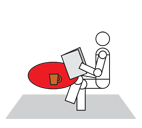
Break room

Mail room: an open or semi-open support space where employees can pick up or deliver their mail.

Pantry: an open or enclosed support space where employees can get refreshments and where supplies for visitor hospitality are kept.

Break room: a semi-open or enclosed support space where employees can take a break from their work.

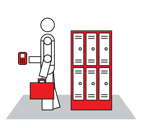
Locker room

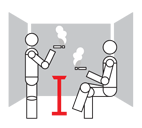
Smoking room

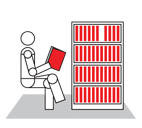
Library

Locker room: an open or semi-open support space where employees can store their personal belongings.

Smoking room: an enclosed support space where employees can smoke a cigarette.

Library: a semi-open or enclosed support space for reading books, journals and magazines.

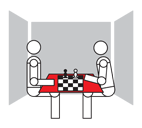
Game room

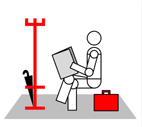
Waiting area

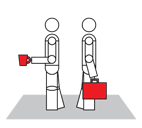
Circulation space

Game room: an enclosed support space where employees can play games, such as pool or darts.

Waiting area: an open or semi-open support space where visitors can be received and wait for their appointment.

Circulation space: support space which is required for circulation on office floors, linking all major functions.

Lactation rooms are also support spaces that are legally mandatory for companies in the United States, as of the 2010 Patient Protection and Affordable Care Act.

== Office structure ==
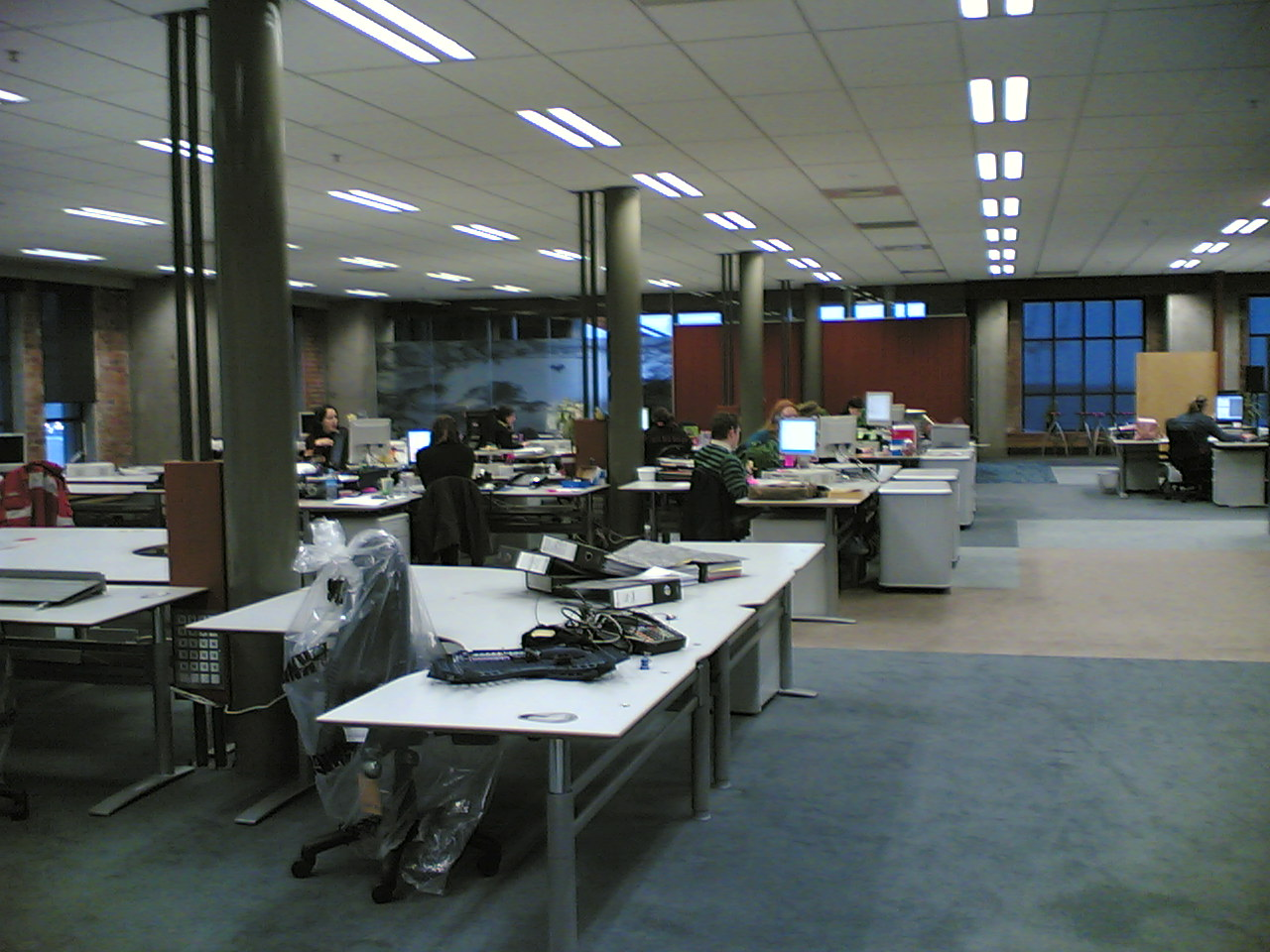
Open plan TradeMe offices, above NZX, Wellington, New Zealand

There are many different ways of arranging the space in an office. Managerial styles and the culture of specific companies are important factors in how office space will ultimately be used. One example of diverging office layout philosophies concerns how many people will work within the same room. At one extreme, each individual worker might have their own room; at the other extreme, a large open plan office might see tens or hundreds of people working in the same room. Open-plan offices put multiple workers together in the same space, and some studies have shown that they can improve short-term productivity. (For example, within a single software project). At the same time, the loss of privacy and security can increase the incidence of theft and loss of company secrets. A type of compromise between open plan and individual rooms is provided by the cubicle desk, possibly made most famous by the Dilbert cartoon series, which solves visual privacy to some extent but often fails on acoustic separation and security. Most cubicles also require the occupant to sit with their back towards anyone who might be approaching. Workers in walled offices typically try to position their normal work seats and desks so that they can see someone entering, and if that goal is not feasible, some install tiny mirrors on things such as computer monitors.

According to research, open-plan offices are associated with increased stress, a rise in electronic communication, a 70% decrease in face-to-face interactions, a 25% uptick in negative moods, and up to a 20% drop in productivity due to distractions. In contrast, post-pandemic trends are favoring private "cell-office plans", which address health precautions and have been reported to enhance productivity by up to 22%.

== Office buildings ==
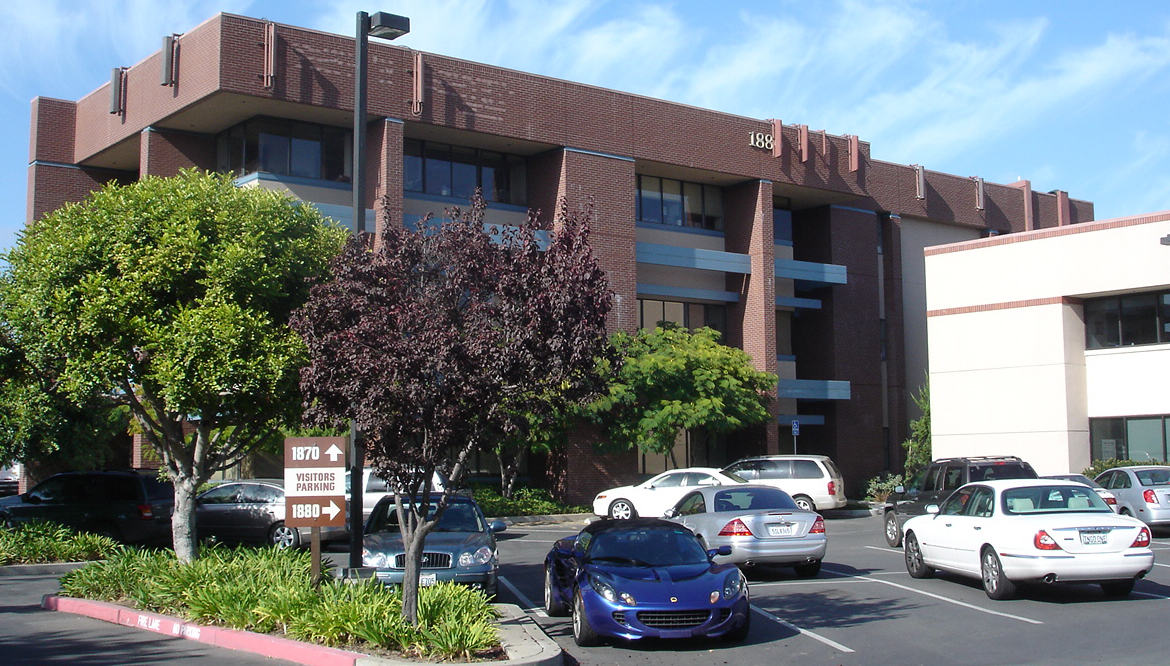
A small office building in Salinas, California, United States

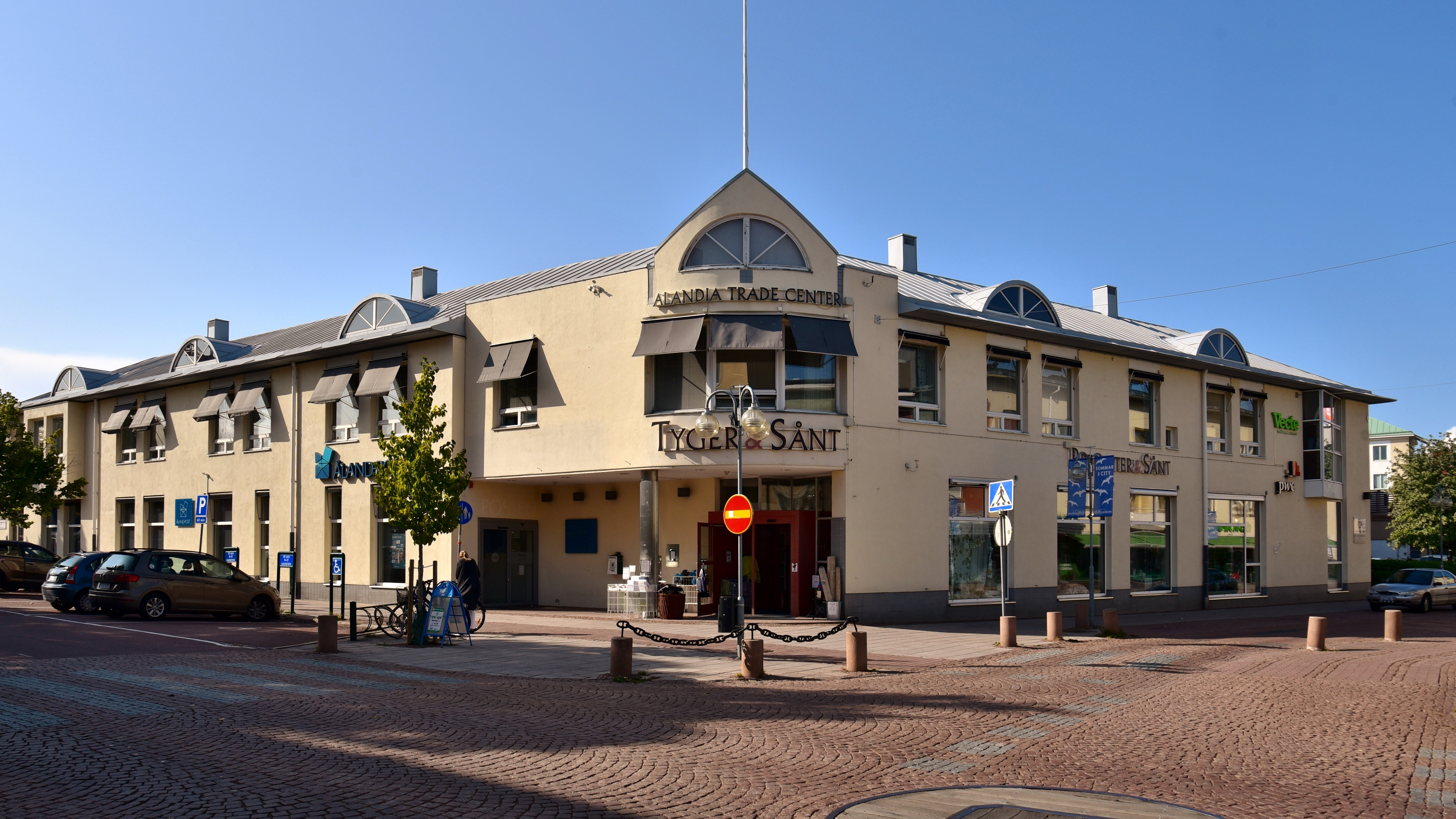
Alandia Trade Center, a real estate office building in Mariehamn, Åland

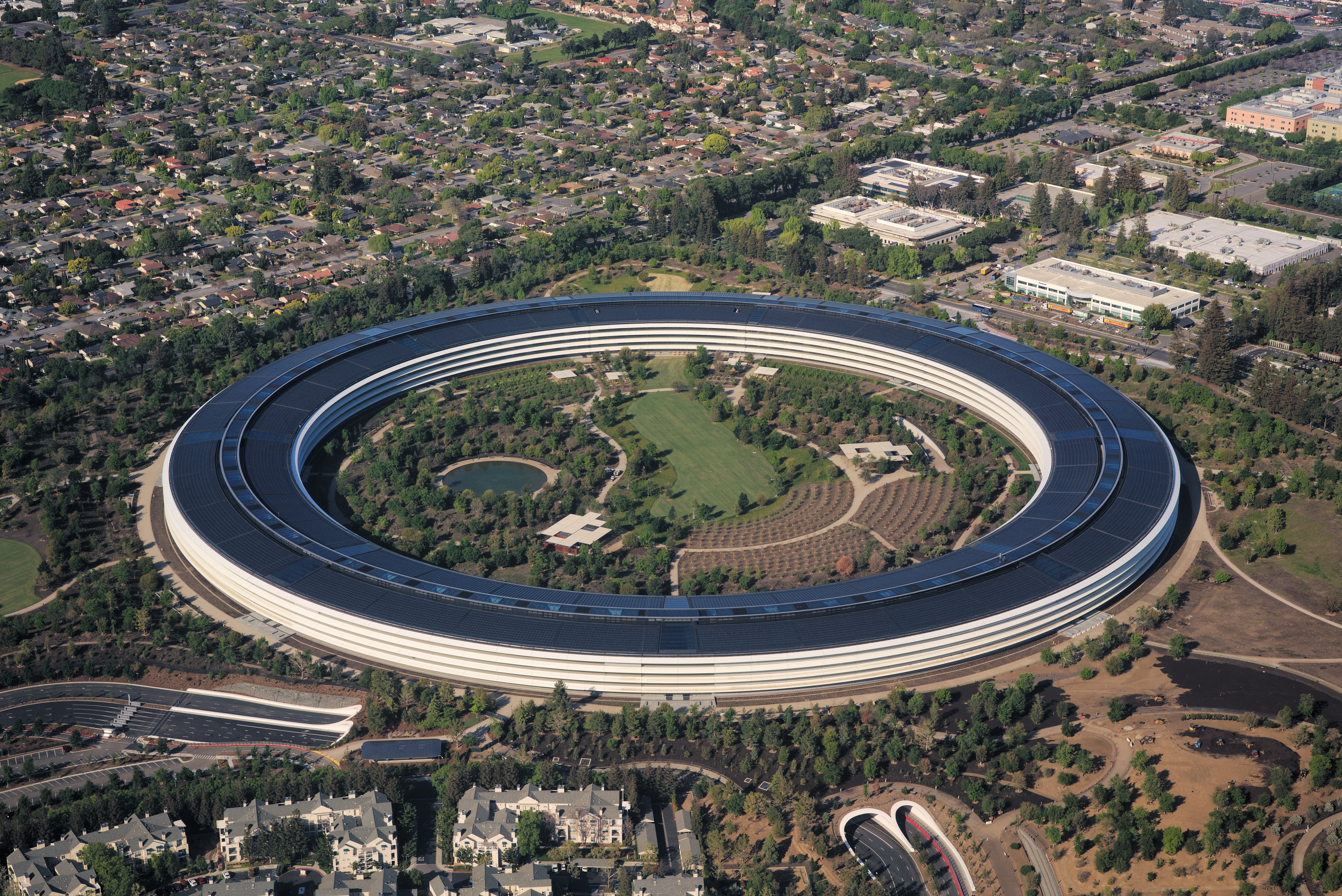
Apple Inc. headquarters of neo-futuristic architecture at Apple Park in Cupertino, California, United States

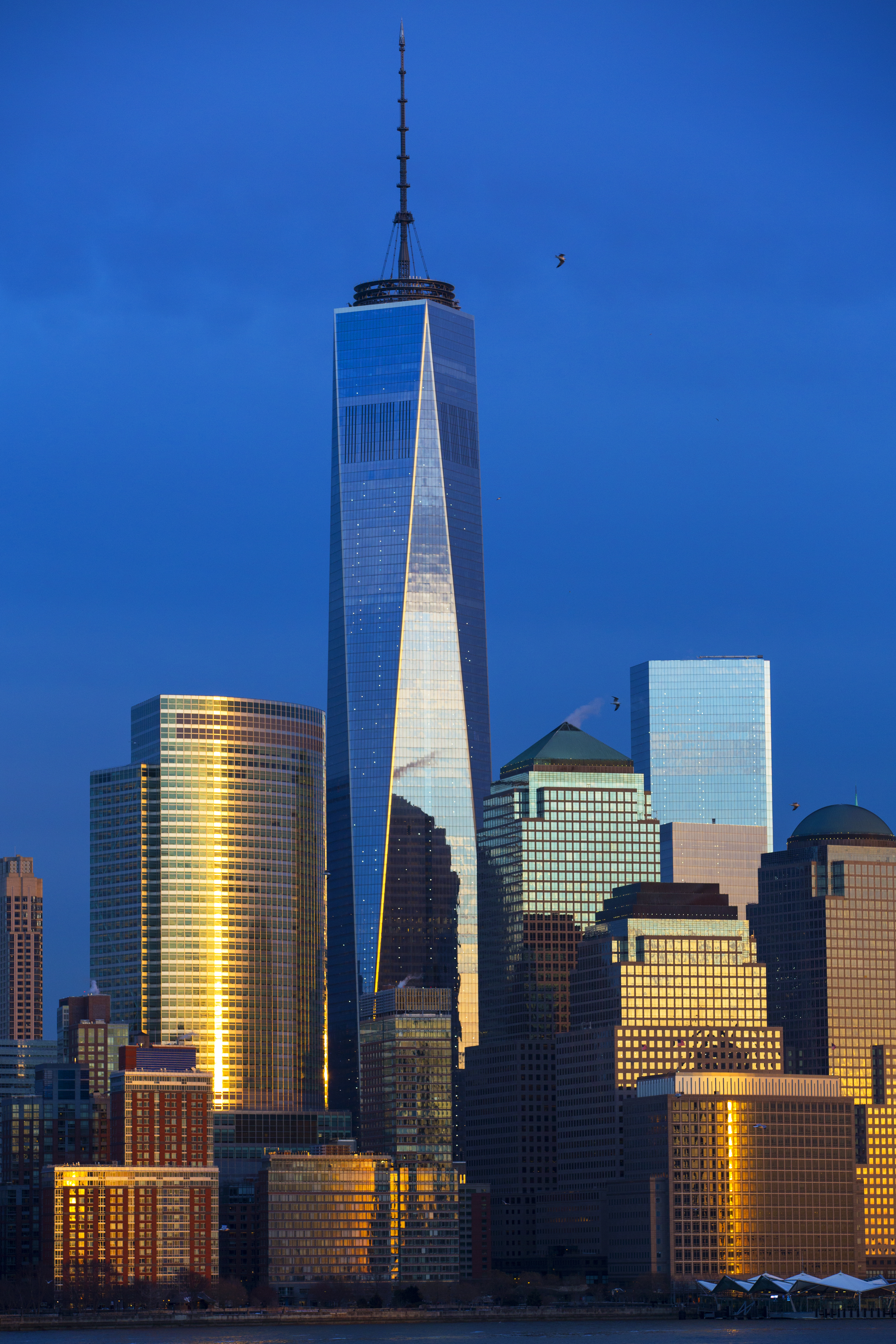
The One World Trade Center in Manhattan is a high-rise office building, the tallest of its kind in the U.S.

While offices can be set up in almost any location and in almost any building, some modern requirements for offices make this more difficult. These requirements can be legal (such as sufficient light levels) or technical (such as requirements for computer networking). Other needs, such as security and layout flexibility, have prompted the creation of special buildings which are dedicated primarily for use as offices. An office building, also known as an office block or business center, is a form of commercial building which contains spaces mainly designed to be used for offices.

The primary purpose of an office building is to provide a workplace and working environment primarily for administrative and managerial workers. These workers usually occupy set up areas within the office building, and usually are provided with desks, PCs and other equipments they may need within their areas.

An office building may be divided into sections for different companies, or it may be dedicated to one company. In either case, each company will typically have a reception area, one or several meeting rooms, singular or open-plan offices, and service rooms such as restrooms.

Many office buildings also have kitchen facilities and a staff room, where workers can have lunch or take a short break. Some office spaces are now also serviced office spaces, allowing for those occupying a space or building to share facilities.

== Office and retail rental rates ==
Rental rates for office and retail space are typically quoted in terms of cost per floor-area–time, usually cost per floor-area per year or month. For example, the rate for a particular property may be $29 per square-foot per year ($29/sq. ft/yr) or $290 per square-meter per year ($290/m^{2}/yr).

In many countries, rent is typically paid monthly, even if usually discussed in terms of years.

Examples:

- A particular 2,000 sq. ft space is priced at $15/sq. ft/yr, ultimately costing (2,000 sq. ft) × ($15/sq. ft/yr) / (12 mo/yr) = $2500 per month
- A particular 200 m^{2} space is priced at $150/m^{2}/yr, ultimately costing (200 m^{2}) × ($150/m^{2}/yr) / (12 mo/yr) = $2500 per month

In a gross lease, the rate quoted is an all-inclusive rate. The renter pays a set amount of rent per time and the landlord is responsible for all other expenses, including payments for utilities, taxes, insurance, maintenance, and repairs.

The triple net lease is one in which the tenant is liable for a share of various expenses such as property taxes, insurance, maintenance, utilities, climate control, repairs, janitorial services and landscaping.

Office rents in the United States are still recovering from the high vacancy rates that occurred in the wake of the 2008 depression.

== Grading ==
The Building Owners and Managers Association (BOMA) classifies office space into three categories: Class A, Class B, and Class C. According to BOMA, Class A office buildings have the "most prestigious buildings competing for premier office users with rents above average for the area." BOMA states that Class A facilities have "high-quality standard finishes, state of the art systems, exceptional accessibility and a definite market presence." BOMA describes Class B office buildings as those that compete "for a wide range of users with rents in the average range for the area." BOMA states that Class B buildings have "adequate systems" and finishes that "are fair to good for the area," but that the buildings do not compete at the same price rates as Class A buildings. According to BOMA, Class C buildings are aimed towards "tenants requiring functional space at rents below the average for the area." The lack of specifics allows considerable room for pushing the boundaries of these BOMA categories. Oftentimes, they are further modified by adding the plus or minus sign to create subclasses, such as Class A+ or Class B-.

== See also ==
Physical

- Business park
- Corner office
- Executive suite
- Factory
- Office space planning
- Office supplies
- Over-illumination
- Steel buildings
- Warehouse

Soft issues

- Business attire
- Office management
- Office politics
- Sick building syndrome
