= Executive suite (disambiguation) =

Executive suite may refer to:

In Design:

- Executive suite, a type of office space

In Culture:

- Executive Suite, a novel by Cameron Hawley
- Executive Suite, a 1954 film starring William Holden
- Executive Suite (TV series), a 1970s American television program
- Executive Suite (video game), a DOS computer game released in 1982
- Executive Suite, a record by the British band The Wiseguys
- Executive Suite, a 1982 album by jazz musicians The L.A. Four

Other uses:

- Clark Tower Executive Suites, a building in Memphis, Tennessee
