= Office space =

Office space may refer to:

- An office
- Office space planning
- Office Space, a 1999 film
