= Law of flat surfaces =

Concept for home organization and cleaning

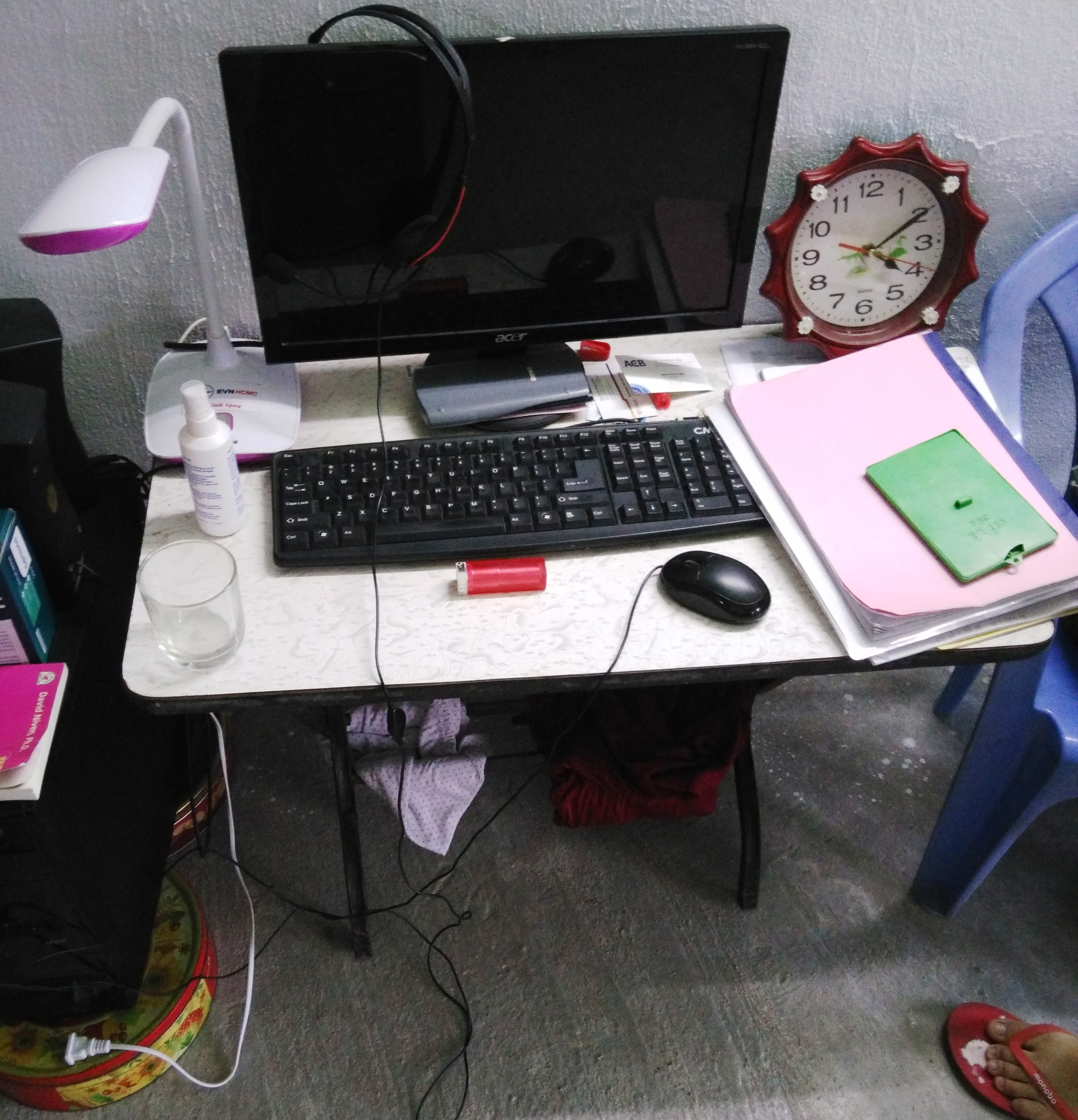
Items clutter a desk

The law of flat surfaces is an interior design concept for home organization and cleaning. It is based upon the principle that any flat surface within a home or office tends to accumulate clutter. As a first step in the reorganization of work and living spaces, organization professionals state that the law of flat surfaces means removing clutter from any flat surfaces such as tables, counter tops and bureau tops.
