= Meditation room =

Meditation room may refer to:

- Chamber of Reflection, a Masonic room of isolation and meditation
- Gompa, a Buddhist fortress of learning
- Meditation centre, a location where meditation is practised
- Multifaith space, a room set aside for prayer of any faith
- Quiet room, a room in an office which has sound dampening for isolatation

== See also ==
- Meditation
