= Action Office =

Flexible, semi-enclosed workspaces in an office landscape-like setting

The Action Office is a series of furniture designed by Robert Propst, and manufactured and marketed by Herman Miller. First introduced in 1964 as the Action Office I product line, then superseded by the Action Office II series, it is an influential design in the history of "contract furniture" (office furniture). The Action Office II series introduced the cubicle.

== History ==
Robert Propst was the Herman Miller Research Corporation's leader during the early 1960s. They worked on an evaluation of "the office" – particularly how it functioned in the 1960s. Propst's studies included learning about the ways people work in an office, how information travels, and how the office layout affects their performance. He consulted with Joan Evans (scholar of ornament and pattern), Terry Allen and Carl Frost (Michigan State University psychologists), Robert Sommer (who investigated the effects of different spaces on mental health), Edward T. Hall (anthropologist and author of the 1959 book, The Silent Language), as well as with a number of specialists.

Propst concluded from his studies that the office environment had changed substantially, especially when considering the dramatic increase in the amount of information being processed. Propst commented that "one of the regrettable conditions of present day offices is the tendency to provide a formula kind of sameness for everyone." In addition, the employees were suffering from long hours of sitting in one position.

=== Action Office I ===
To address the problems plaguing office workers of the time during 1964, the Action Office I was created. The Action Office I received the Alcoa Award.

=== Action Office II ===
Following the poor feedback of Action Office I, Propst and his colleague George Nelson sought to create the next-generation, Action Office II. For several years Propst and Nelson fought. With Nelson gone, Propst was free to explore his concept of an office that was capable of modification to suit the changing needs of the employee. He wanted to allow the employee a degree of privacy.

Action Office II had components that anyone could assemble and install. More importantly, they allowed the company to modify the work environment as needs changed.

The Action Office II lineup was an unprecedented success, often referred to as the birth of the modern cubicle, and was quickly copied by other manufacturers.

Despite the Action Office II line becoming Herman Miller's most successful project, George Nelson was unsatisfied with the project. Specifically, he claimed that the system had a "dehumanizing effect as a working environment".

== Action Office today ==
The Action Office I series was dropped from the Herman Miller lineup in 1970. In 1978 the Action Office II line was renamed simply Action Office.

Worldesign Congress 1985 named the Action Office as "the world's most significant industrial design for the years 1961–1985".

Recent modifications to Action Office include increased storage and more collaborative workspaces. The New York Museum of Modern Art added Resolve, a 1999 design that incorporates technology and 120° corners, to the museum's permanent collection in 2001.

In 1997, Robert Propst said that he had hoped that his idea would "give knowledge workers a more flexible, fluid environment than the rat-maze boxes of offices," but regretted that his idea had evolved to some extent into just that, saying that "the cubicle-izing of people in modern corporations is monolithic insanity."

== In the media ==
Action Office furnishings have appeared in many films released within the last thirty years. The first film to feature Action Office products was Stanley Kubrick's 2001: A Space Odyssey, released in 1968. In the film a white Action Office I roll-top desk is used in the space station reception area.

== See also ==
- Office landscape
- Office space planning
- Systems furniture
