= Hoteling =

Method of office management

Hoteling (also hotelling or office hoteling) is a method of office management in which workers dynamically schedule their use of workspaces such as desks, cubicles, and offices. It is an alternative approach to the more traditional method of permanently assigned seating. Hoteling is reservation-based unassigned seating; employees reserve a workspace before they come to work in an office. An alternate method of handling unassigned seating is hot desking, which does not involve reservations; with hot-desking, a worker chooses a workspace upon arrival, rather than reserving it in advance. The use of the term has declined in recent years.

Under the hoteling model, employees do not have permanently assigned desks. Instead, they reserve a workspace for the specific days they plan to work in the office. The benefits of hoteling over a more traditional, one-desk-per-employee scenario include saving costs on commercial real estate, as well as creating opportunities for staff to mingle and collaborate more.

The practice of hoteling has resulted from increased worker mobility, enabled by advances in mobile technology. Organizations whose workers travel frequently, or with growing remote or mobile workforces, are best suited to hoteling. A Washington Post article cites the rising use of hoteling as reflecting a shift from the office being a "home base" to being a "hospitality hub."

Companies started implementing hoteling in the 1990s, with consulting and accounting firms among the early adopters.

== How it works ==
Hoteling is more appropriate to some work roles than others. In 1994, two Chicago firms moving to a hoteling model considered the categories of workers best suited to working under the model. When Booz Allen adopted a hoteling system in 2011, it exempted receptionists and those working in graphics rooms and print shops.

Hoteling systems can vary in complexity, from a basic process for reserving office space to sophisticated systems integrated with a company's information technology (IT) system. Technical integration can be an important element of a hoteling system's success, permitting workers to access the information they need about the office and easily make reservations.

Software designed to manage a hoteling system may be integrated with other workplace functions, such as employee ID badges, through a company's IT system. When employees arrive at work (or log in remotely), they access the hoteling reservation software and log in. They can then either reserve spaces by their name/number or, in some systems, by looking at a blueprint of the office and visually selecting a workspace. Once the reservation process is complete, a number of functions may be performed by the system including the routing of phone service to the workspace, the notification of an office "concierge" who prepares the workspace, etc. With many systems, workers are required to "check-in" through a terminal connected to the reservations database as they arrive at the office location.

== Applications and value ==
Analysts have described hoteling as a reflection of broader shifts in how work is structured and understood in contemporary society. Adoption of the model has been driven by a need for cost savings, and by the opportunities that come with new technology.

Hoteling was first implemented by consulting firms and customer representative companies, and these types of companies continue to be the highest users of such systems. It is best suited to big companies whose workers travel frequently, but can work well for a variety of organizations. One industry expert stated in 2008 that "almost all large companies have some sort of program like [hoteling]."

As of 2013, the US agency FEMA planned to move to a hoteling model by 2016; and a 2015 plan announced by the U.S. Department of Homeland Security and the General Services Administration named hoteling as one of the techniques that would reduce the budget of its consolidation plan by about $1 billion.

== See also ==
- Executive suite
- Outsourcing
- Small office
- Remote work
- Serviced office
- Telecentre
- Virtual office
