= Executive suite =

Offices used by executives of a business

An executive suite in its most general definition is a collection of offices or rooms—or suite—used by top managers of a business—or executives. Over the years, this general term has taken on a variety of specific meanings.

== Corporate office ==
The oldest use of the term "executive suites" referred to the suite of offices on or near the top floor of a skyscraper where the top executives of a company worked, usually including at least the president or chief executive officer, various vice presidents and their staff.

That use was then applied not just to the physical space but also to the people who occupy the offices and their immediate underlings, much like the White House has come to mean the Executive Office of the President of the United States or 10 Downing Street, the British Prime Minister's Office. A quote from the Ottawa Sun in 2003 shows this use: "The Montreal Canadiens are fading in the Eastern Conference playoff race, but there is no panic in the executive suite."

The term was used by writer Cameron Hawley for the title of his 1952 book Executive Suite, which was later turned into an Academy Award-winning movie with the same name in 1953 and a short-lived T.V. series in 1975. A 1982 computer game was also called Executive Suite.

== Serviced office ==
An executive suite can also be a set of individual offices sublet from a larger suite of offices. The executive suite proprietor rents entire floors (or buildings) and leases the smaller office spaces or workstations to businesses that don't need, or can't afford, large space. Some executive suite operators offer additional services. This variation on the traditional office idea has become an industry with roots in the early 1960s. There is no universal agreement on terminology as executive suites go by many different names, such as: open plan office, serviced office, office business center, office suite, business center, executive office, furnished office, flexible office, managed office, shared-office space and hoteling. It is not uncommon for a traditional tenant to sublet unutilized space and to characterize it as an “executive suite.”

Many businesses considering executive suites are small entrepreneur start-up companies that could experience growth or go out of business before a term's end-date. Considering this, flexible terms are offered to accommodate unforeseen growth or the dissolution of a company. The office space also has a number of amenities that smaller offices may not be able to afford such as a breakroom, video conference room equipment, storage space and mailboxes. They also offer temporary support such as the opportunity for tenants to share executive office staff to assist with projects/assignments.

These offices serve many of the same purposes as virtual offices but characteristically include the physical location that other entirely online offices do not. Since the spaces and corresponding rent or lease payments are small, many prospective renters often work directly with landlords to obtain space rather than working through commercial real estate brokers. Other prospective renters use the internet to find executive of small office space to rent or lease.

=== History ===
The first recorded executive suites in the United States were offered by OmniOffices in 1962, followed by furnished offices for attorneys offered by Fegen Law Suites in 1966. In 1978, Alf Mourfarrige founded ServCorp in Sydney, Australia for businesses looking to share overhead expenses, including receptionist and clerical staff. Servcorp took its virtual office concept international in 1980 and in 1999 became a publicly traded company. As technologies such as the portable computer, the World Wide Web, VoIP, and videoconferencing became available in the 1980s and 1990s, executive suites began to offer them as part of a complete “virtual office” package. In 1985, James Blain, a Michigan-based architect, opened his first AmeriCenters in Troy, Michigan. The company added locations in Michigan, Indiana, Illinois and Ohio. Mark Dixon conceived an executive suit company in 1989 on a trip to Belgium. His company evolved into Regus, a publicly traded and successful operator of individual office suites internationally. The company became overextended and went bankrupt in 2003. Less than a year later it took its US business out of Chapter 11 after restructuring, financed by its share of the profitable UK business. Since the financial issues Regus experienced in 2003 the company has successfully turned it fortunes around, as the serviced office industry has continued to grow in popularity.

In 1994, Ralph Gregory presented virtual offices including physical executive suites, staff and technology as a franchise opportunity in the United States under The Virtual Office, Inc., later renamed The Intelligent Office, Inc. In 2005, the first “coworking space” opened in San Francisco, which emphasized the community and collaborative aspects of several businesses sharing an executive suite and its amenities.

== Hotel ==
Various companies in the corporate housing industry also use the term "executive suite" to describe fully furnished executive style apartments.

== Stadiums ==
Luxury boxes, the most expensive and exclusive seats at sports stadiums, are also called "executive suites" such as at the Edmonton Eskimos's Commonwealth Stadium. Such seats are often purchased by corporations for a season for their executives and clients, therefore the use of "executive", and often have multiple spaces such as box seats outside and an interior room with large windows, therefore "suites". They can accommodate a dozen or more guests.

== Cultural references ==
Besides the novel, and the subsequent film and television show, and the computer game, all mentioned above, both jazz musicians The L.A. Four and British band The Wiseguys have released albums with the titles Executive Suite.
