= Open plan =

Floor plan that makes use of large open spaces

The team-oriented "bullpen", an example of open plan in use

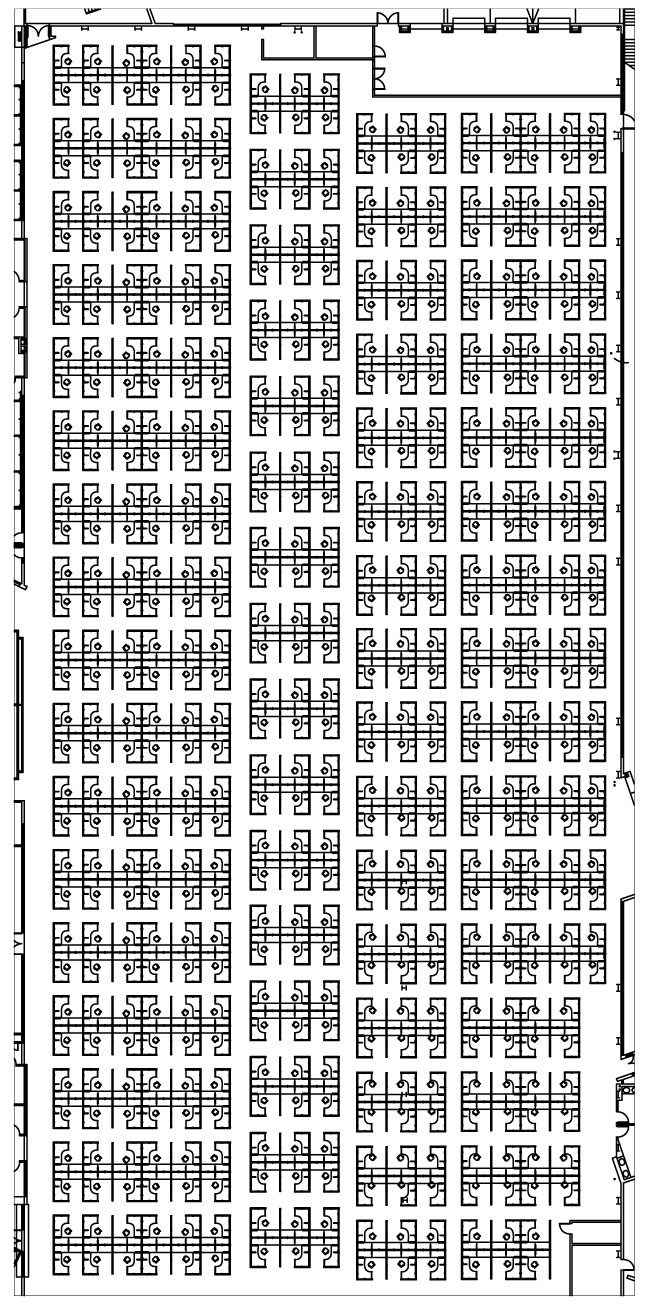
A sea of cubicles, one type of open plan

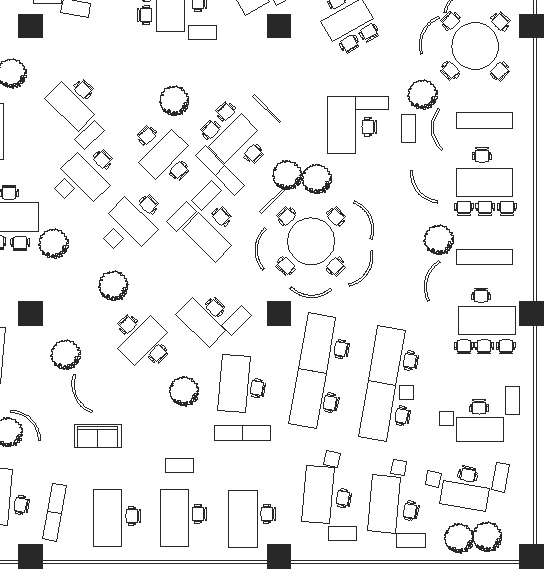
An office landscape floor plan, another type of open plan

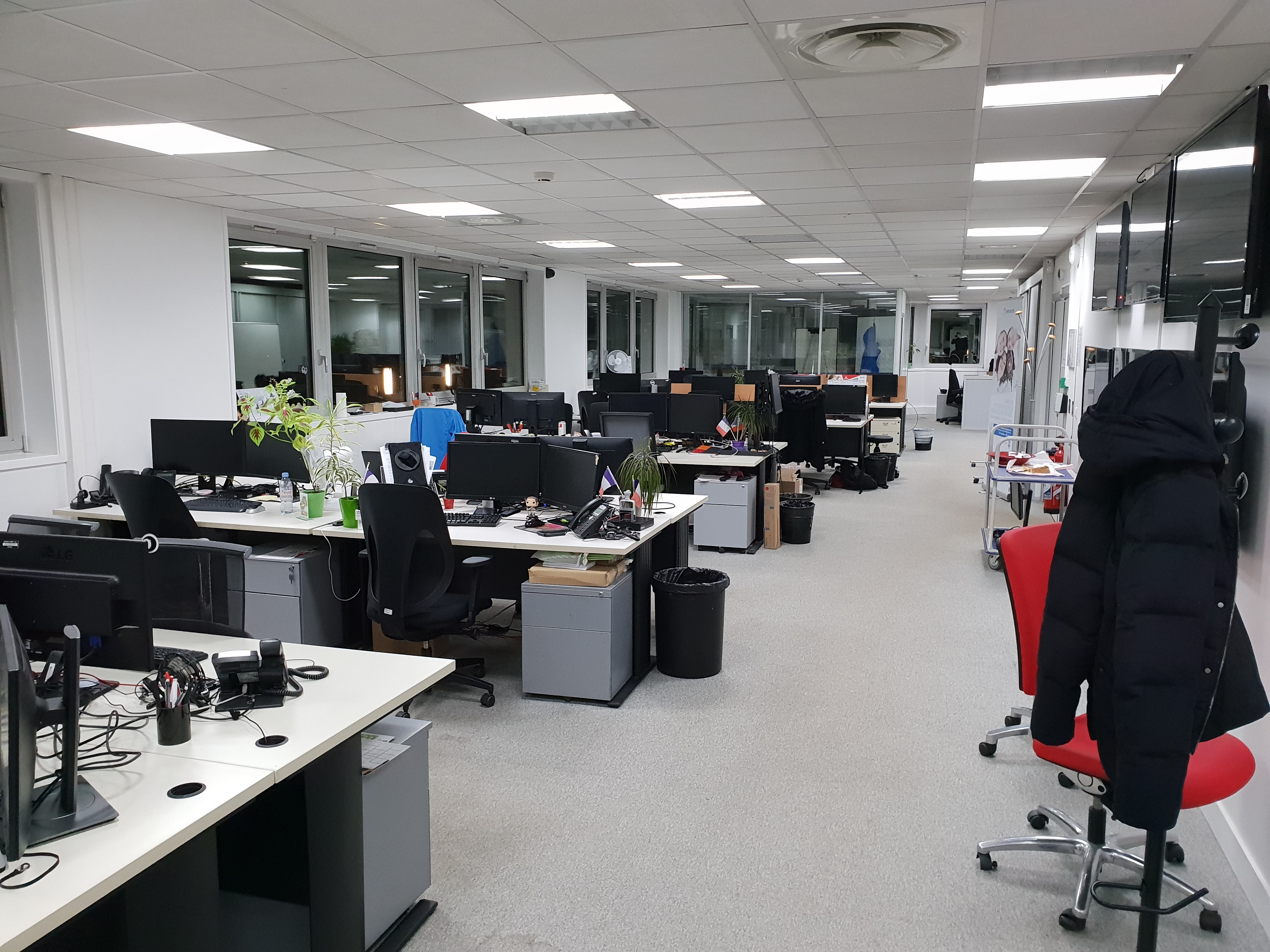
An information technology department in a French company in 2019

Open plan is the generic term used in architectural and interior design for any floor plan that makes use of large, open spaces and minimizes the use of small, enclosed rooms such as private offices. The term can also refer to landscaping of housing estates, business parks, etc., in which there are no defined property boundaries, such as hedges, fences, or walls.

Open-plan office designs (e.g., tables with no visual barriers) reduce short-term building costs, compared to cubicles or private offices, but result in persistently lower productivity, dramatically fewer face-to-face interactions among staff, and a higher number of sick days. An open office plan may have permanently assigned spaces at a table, or it may be used as a flex space or hot desking program.

In residential design, open plan or open concept (the term used mainly in Canada) describes the elimination of barriers such as walls and doors that traditionally separated distinct functional areas, such as combining the kitchen, living room, and dining room into a single great room.

== Homes ==
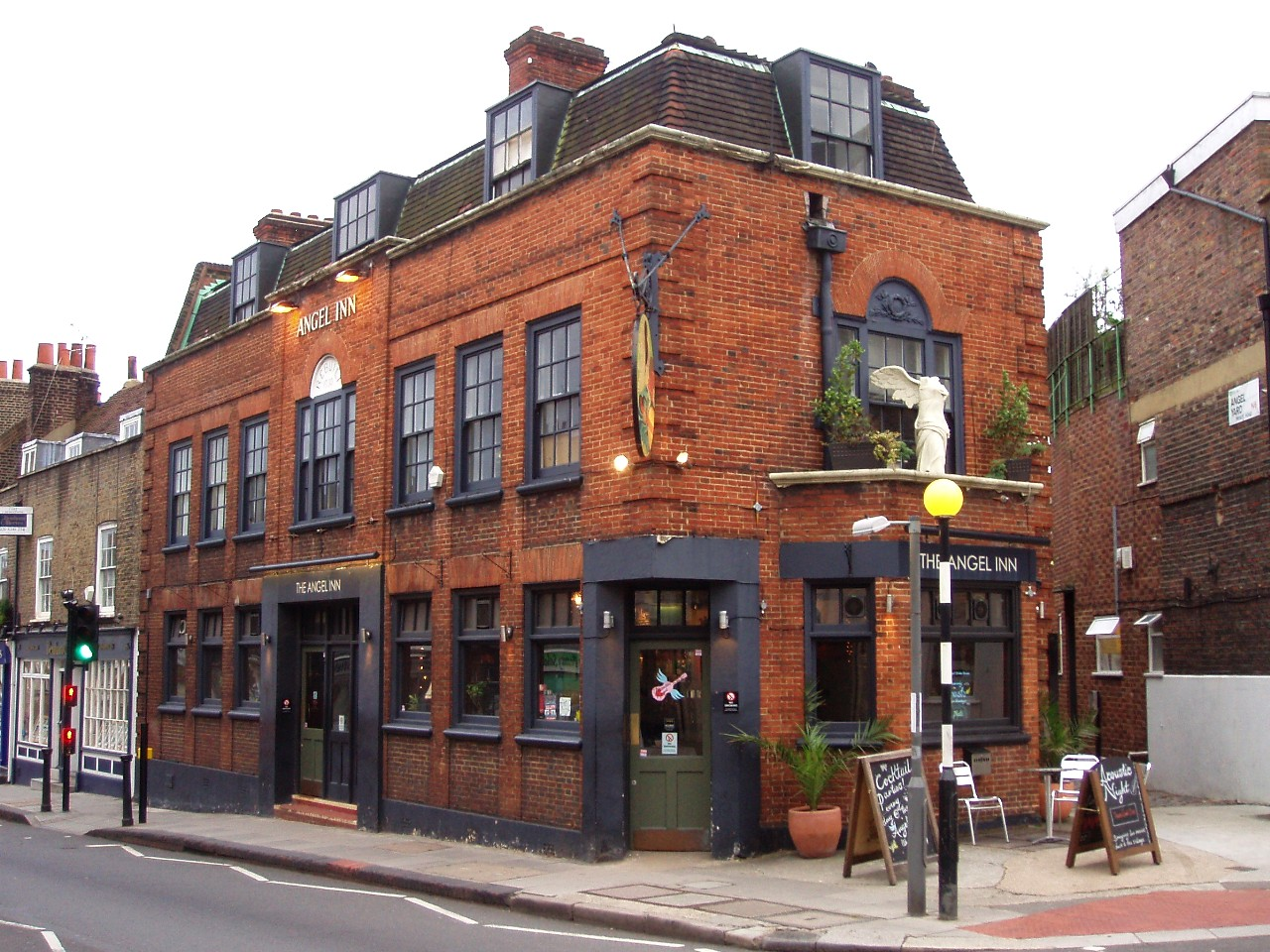
Angel Inn, Highgate, north London, England

Many pre-industrial homes were huts that consisted of a single room, but this was usually small. Already in the Middle Ages, however, there were some single-room hearth-heated hall houses, shop houses, and Inn houses with rent employed owner-occupants. For example in pre-plague London England. After the plague owners of houses in London added rooms. These rooms began to be labeled with a name and a furnishing practice.

In the 1880s middle class suburban houses for families replaced small public rooms of the home with specific functions with larger rooms that fulfilled multiple uses. Walls were abolished or replaced with archways that had glass doors or sliding doors. But kitchens, bedrooms, and bathrooms remained enclosed private spaces. Larger rooms were made possible by advances in centralized heating that allowed larger spaces to be kept at comfortable temperatures.

Frank Lloyd Wright was one of the early advocates for open plan design in houses, expanding on the ideas of Charles and Henry Greene and shingle style architecture. Wright's designs were based on a centralized kitchen open to other public spaces of the home where the housewife could be "more hostess 'officio', operating in gracious relation to her home, instead of being a kitchen mechanic behind closed doors." Not having a dividing wall between the kitchen and a combined living-dining room became more popular especially in the United States in the 1970s.

In the late 2010s, the open plan design became less common. Complaints about open plan designs include that they make it more difficult for different people to engage in different activities and make it difficult to hide clutter or a dirty kitchen. Walls are useful to contain noise and smells and to provide privacy, and small rooms are more efficient to heat and cool (especially when kitchen appliances are in use). A follow-on trend among relatively wealthy homeowners is to build a second "mess kitchen" where the actual activity of food preparation takes place, while entertaining happens in a clean kitchen that is part of the open concept space.

== Office spaces ==
=== Development of open-plan workspace types ===
Prior to the 1950s open-plan offices mostly consisted of large regular rows of desks or benches where clerks, typists, or technicians performed repetitive tasks. Such designs were rooted in the work of industrial engineers or efficiency experts such as Frederick Winslow Taylor and Henry Ford. In the 1950s a German team named Quickborner developed the office landscape, which used conventional furniture, curved screens, large potted plants, and organic geometry to create work groups on large, open floors. Office landscape was quickly supplanted by office-furniture companies which developed cubicles based on panel-hung or systems furniture. Many terms (mostly derisive) have been used over time for offices using the old-style, large arrays of open cubicles.

An increase in knowledge work and the emergence of mobile technology during the late 20th-century led to an evolution in open-plan offices. Some companies experimented with designs that provided a mix of cubicles, open workstations, private offices, and group workstations. In some cases, these are not assigned to one particular individual, but are available to any employee of the company on either a reservable or "drop-in" (first come, first served) basis. Terms for this strategy include hoteling, "alternative officing" and "hot desking".

Michael Bloomberg used a team-oriented bullpen style – where employees can see and hear each other freely, but desks are grouped into teams – at his media company Bloomberg L.P. and for his staff while Mayor of New York City (in office: 2002–2013).

=== Evaluation ===
A systematic survey of research upon the effects of open-plan offices found frequent negative effects in some traditional workplaces: high levels of noise, stress, conflict, high blood pressure and a high staff turnover.

The noise level in open-plan offices greatly reduces productivity. Productivity in an open-office plan has been estimated to be one-third what the same workers would achieve in quiet rooms. Noisy new technologies, like voice-activation and mobile phones, also decrease effectiveness in the open-plan setting. One study found employees were less likely to share their views on phone calls in open offices, because they worry that their co-workers will overhear them and judge them negatively. Employees worry that speaking out loud will distract their co-workers.

Some design goals of open plan offices include letting everyone see what everyone else is doing at any given moment, reducing information silos by letting everyone overhear what everyone else is saying, and flattening organizational hierarchies.

Although promoted as a way to encourage collaboration, speed decision-making, and increase the group's collective intelligence, open-plan offices result in a dramatic reduction in face-to-face interactions, as employees turn to digital communication, such as sending e-mail messages. Open-plan offices have frequently been found to reduce the confidential or private conversations which employees engage in, and to reduce job satisfaction, concentration and performance, whilst increasing auditory and visual distractions.

Open-plan offices elevate the risk of employees needing to take time off for sickness. The more people working in a single room, the more sick time is needed. People who work in open-office plans containing more than six people take over 160% as many sick days as those who work in private offices. Different plans have slightly different risks; for example, men working in a flex space have a significantly increased risk for short-term illnesses (e.g., the common cold or influenza). Easily spread respiratory diseases such as COVID-19 may militate against working in open-plan offices.

Some negative aspects of open plan offices can be addressed with interior design, such as establishing separate places for face-to-face discussions or using materials that absorb noise.
