= Quiet room =

Room built with regard to silence by shielding noise

A quiet room or silent room is a room, typically in an office, built with regard to silence by shielding noise from or towards the surroundings. In an office setting, they are often made for one person, and differs from a meeting room which typically are larger and can accommodate several people. Quiet rooms have been described as necessity in office landscapes in addition to telephone rooms and meeting rooms. Some have suggested that an office landscape should have at least one quiet room per six employees.

== Use ==
A quiet room can both shield against noise from the surroundings, and shield the surroundings from noise from inside the quiet room.

=== For concentration ===
In one sense, the quiet room is a place of silence where one can stay without noise disturbance from others, for example in order to perform work requiring concentration or which is confidential in nature. An example of use can be if a person is seated in a noisy office landscape and is handed a task which requires special concentration.

There are also examples of quiet rooms being installed in small private homes which otherwise lack the space or number of rooms to give the occupants privacy (see also man cave).

=== For noisy work ===
In another sense, a quiet room can be used to shield the surroundings from noisy work. This may be relevant, for example, if a person in an office landscape is to have a video meeting, and especially if the meeting is longer or if the person will be having an active role in the meeting. In this context, a distinction is often made between a quiet room and a meeting room; a quiet room is usually used when one person in the office is having a longer conversation, while meeting rooms are used for accommodating several meeting participants in the same room.

== Other meanings ==
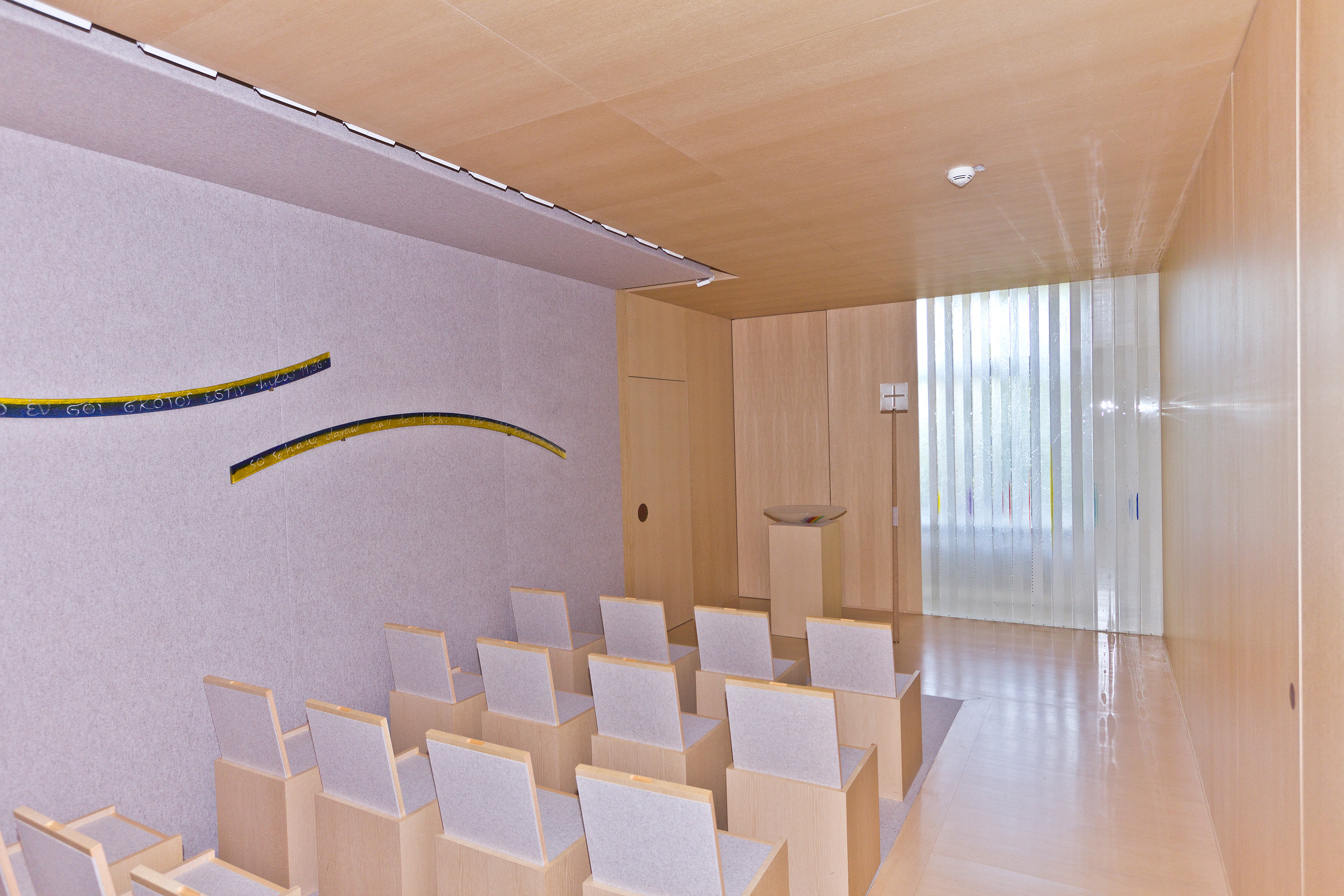
A non-denominational prayer room in Landtag of Bavaria, the parliament in the state of Bavaria. Credit: Sven Teschke

A quiet room can, depending on context, be used as a euphemism for special types of rooms. Multifaith spaces are sometimes called quiet rooms. Breastfeeding rooms are also sometimes called quiet rooms. Quiet room or rest room can also refer to sensory rooms, for example for recovering stroke patients.

Quiet rooms can also refer to a "sanctuary" or a place where you can rest and let the mind fly, or even perform yoga. In some cases, quiet rooms have been set up temporarily as a place where people can mourn.

== See also ==
- Anechoic chamber, a room designed to be completely echo free
- Organizational culture, hereunder office culture
- Remote work
- Safe room
