= Executive Suite (video game) =

1982 video game

- Developer(s): Armonk Corporation
- Publisher(s): Armonk Corporation
- Platform(s): IBM PC
- Release: NA: 1982
- Genre(s): Life simulation involving managerial skills
- Mode(s): Single-player

Executive Suite is a text-based business simulation game published in 1982 as a self-booting disk for IBM PC compatibles. It was developed by Armonk Corporation, a small software development company based in Newport Beach, California, and was published under their "Gray Flannel Fun" label. Unlike most other business simulations, it does not involve making actual economic decisions or managing stores of resources. Rather, the player must manage the trajectory of their character's career at a single fictional corporation, MMC (Mighty Microcomputer Corporation), by making a series of on-the-job and managerial decisions while navigating office politics, evading blame for bad outcomes, and gaining support in different roles throughout the company.

The game presents the player with situations and problems which must be solved by choosing from multiple choices. After a series of questions the game evaluates the player's performance resulting in either a career advancement option or getting fired from the company. During the course of the game, the economy can change from a boom into a recession and even into a depression. The goal of the simulation is to rise to the position of President, thus coming to occupy the titular and coveted "Executive suite", before hitting the firm's mandatory retirement age of seventy-five.

== Gameplay ==
The game begins with an interview portion, where the applicant arrives at the office of MMC's Personnel Manager. The player is asked a series of probing demographic questions about where they went to school, what they studied, how well they did in their studies, what their personality and level of ambition is like, their favorite sport and years of work experience, as well as their age, gender, and marital status. Some of this information is used to determine the list of entry-level jobs available to the player—the high school graduate is stuck with an initial position in the mailroom or as a maintenance person while someone with an Engineering education and good grades will be able to enter at a higher position. Amusingly, background and consistency has little to no bearing beyond this point – until very senior levels, the player is encouraged to take jobs in many departments to build their ranks of named friends across the organization.

Since at MMC, workers apparently do not receive promotions but instead must every few years apply for new jobs internally, gameplay proceeds very cyclically. At application time, the player is presented with a list of available jobs which have a particular job level and are tied to a specific department (Production, Marketing, Sales, Public Relations, Administration, Engineering, Accounting). Their character's performance in their previous position (poor, good, average), their repute in individual departments, and the status of the global business cycle (the economy is a state of expansion, recession, or even depression) determines this list, down which the player can (if they are incompetent or even unlucky) fall precipitously, or get stuck in low or mid-level jobs. As the employee makes decisions, they collect reputation attributes (such as for habitually shirking work or, on the other hand, aggressively looking out for the company's interest) and cause events for which they are either "fortunately" or "unfortunately" remembered at hiring time; this determines whether they get a "thumbs-up" or a "thumbs-down" for the new post. If they get the job, a Status Change form is sent detailing the new salary and an often dubious set of perks to go along with the new position.

When not between jobs, the player is presented with short scenarios pertinent to the position which must be resolved by picking one of several solutions. The scenarios vary in terms of the seriousness of poor outcomes: sometimes the worst choice is not much different from the optimal choice (especially in social "no-win scenarios"), sometimes only the next hiring cycle is adversely affected, or an action puts off a potential executive ally or puts a permanent black mark on the personnel file. In a few rare instances, even a flawlessly performing employee can trigger a game over with a poor decision – such as by quitting the company for another job, or by sleeping with the wrong contact. Too much "poor" performance in a role also triggers a note detailing the player's termination ("Hit the road, jack") from MMC, replete with an enumeration of all the demerits registered in the personnel file, and the game ends.

Eventually, if the employee avoids termination, and reaches the highest job level before reaching the mandatory retirement age, they have the opportunity to apply for the position of President, subject to a review of their merits conducted by the Board. Upon winning the game, there is a nameplate change in the Executive Suite, a formal announcement of the hire is made, and the employee's current worth is calculated as a final score.

== Themes ==
In general, the player benefits from making decisions that keep them out of harm's way with management, and generally avoiding unethical, illegal, unsound, or obviously inane decisions—unless they provide a clear benefit to their perceived loyalty within the firm. Suppliers, scheming coworkers, competitors, and representatives of regulatory agencies such as the IRS and OSHA are all best viewed adversarially. In keeping with the game's satirical and cynical view of corporate culture, it also pays to keep track of the caricatural personalities of officers of the company with an eye to impressing rather than disappointing them (for example, the nepotistic and doddering incumbent president values loyalty to a fault, while the VP of Administration hates extra work being made for her, and executives in Sales and Marketing are mostly concerned with receiving credit for their exploits and putting on good entertainment for clients). Consistent with the game's theme of impersonality and disposability, you are not rewarded for looking after family members in decisions, or for making money from your dealings on the side.

== See also ==
- Wall Street Kid
