= Robert Propst (inventor) =

American inventor (1921–2000)

Robert Propst (1921–2000) was an American inventor. He was the inventor of the Action Office that evolved into the cubicle office furniture system.

== Biography and work ==
Born in Colorado, Propst worked for Herman Miller (Research) in Ann Arbor, Michigan, where he was hired in 1958 by company president Hugh DePree to "find problems outside of the furniture industry and to conceive solutions for them."

Propst's 120 inventions include:

- a vertical timber harvester
- a quality control system for concrete
- an electronic tagging system for livestock
- a mobile office for a quadriplegic
- modular systems for use in hospitals

In 1953, he formed Propst Co. in Denver, Colorado, to commercialize his inventions.

Propst's work has been exhibited at the Walker Art Center in Minneapolis, the Smithsonian Institution, and the Henry Ford Museum.

=== Cubicle ===
"Father of the Cubicle" is a misnomer. When Propst designed the Action Office system, so-called "cubicle farms" were not his intent. Propst's own research into developing the action office philosophically was against the cubicle in many ways. The Action Office system was designed to promote productivity, privacy, and health (they attempted to increase blood flow) at the expense of some inefficient use of space. Cubicles are now typically designed to maximize efficient use of space.

The efficient "cubicle" became popular in office design because of the movable wall seen in the Action Office II (AO2) system, which initially saved money in construction and development costs. After their introduction into the marketplace, the Action Office II and other office systems were modified to pack in as many employees as possible into an office space. This vision was contrary to Propst's intentions, and he stated that "The cubiclizing of people in modern corporations is monolithic insanity."

== Awards ==
- Best Collection of the Year, Home Furnishings Daily, 1964
- 21st Annual International Design Award, American Institute of Interior Designers, 1970
- Distinguished Service Citation, Institute of Business Designers, 1972
- Design Review Industrial Design Award, 1976

== Burial ==
Mr. Propst has a burial marker at the Propst family plot in Riverside Cemetery, Sterling, CO.
