= Cubicle =

Office furniture meant to allow for concentration

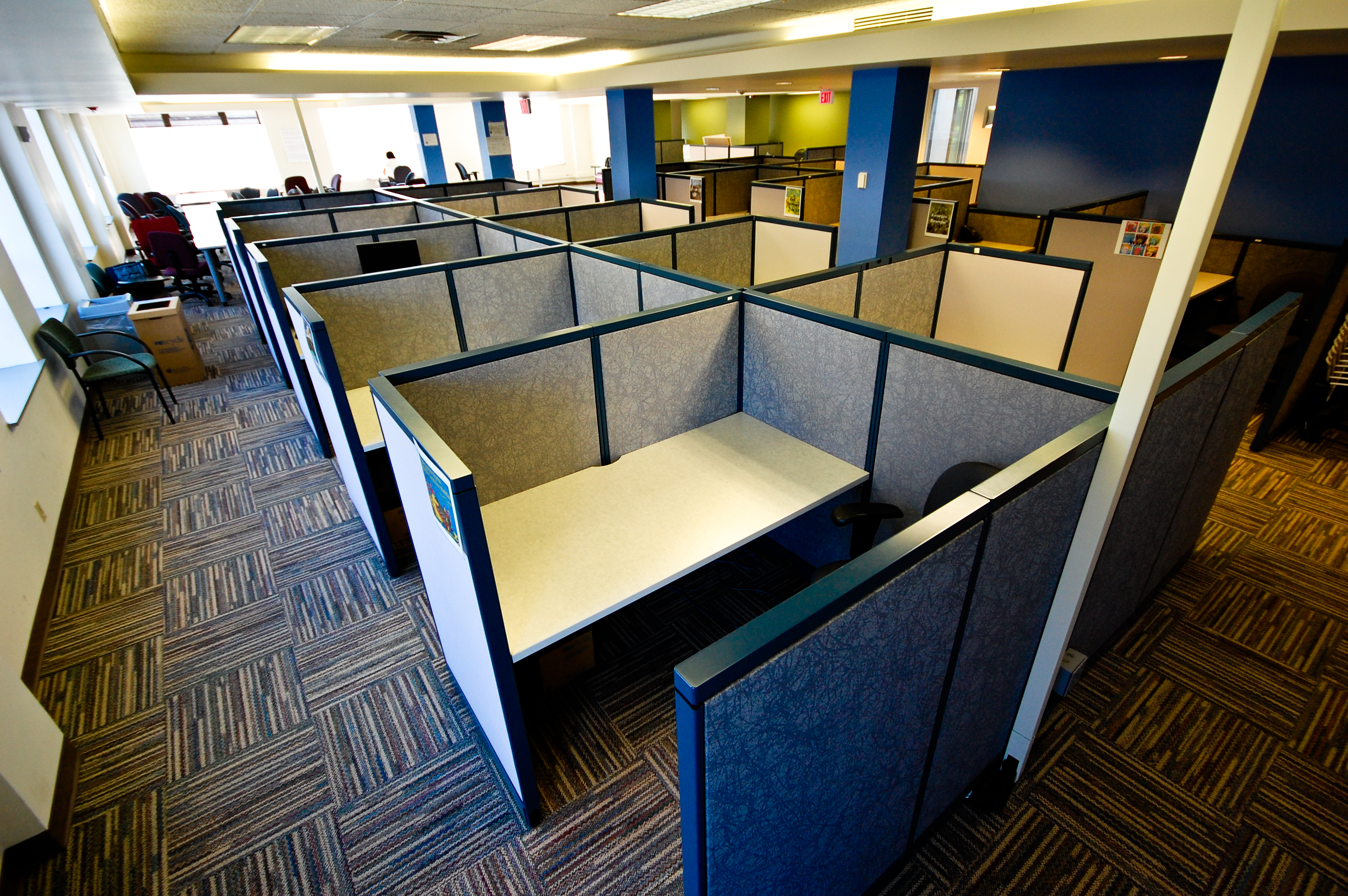
Empty cubicles in an office

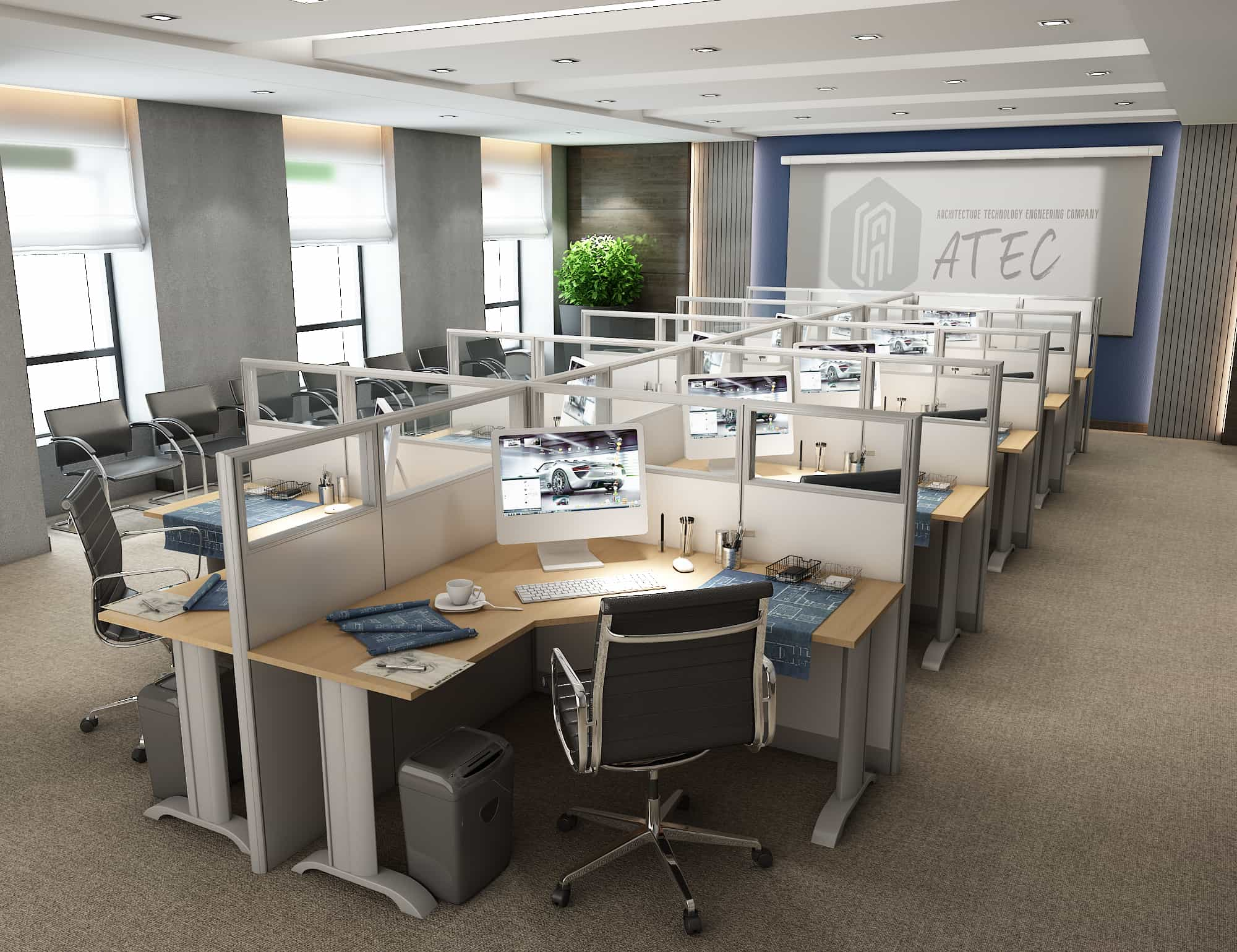
3D model of cubicles

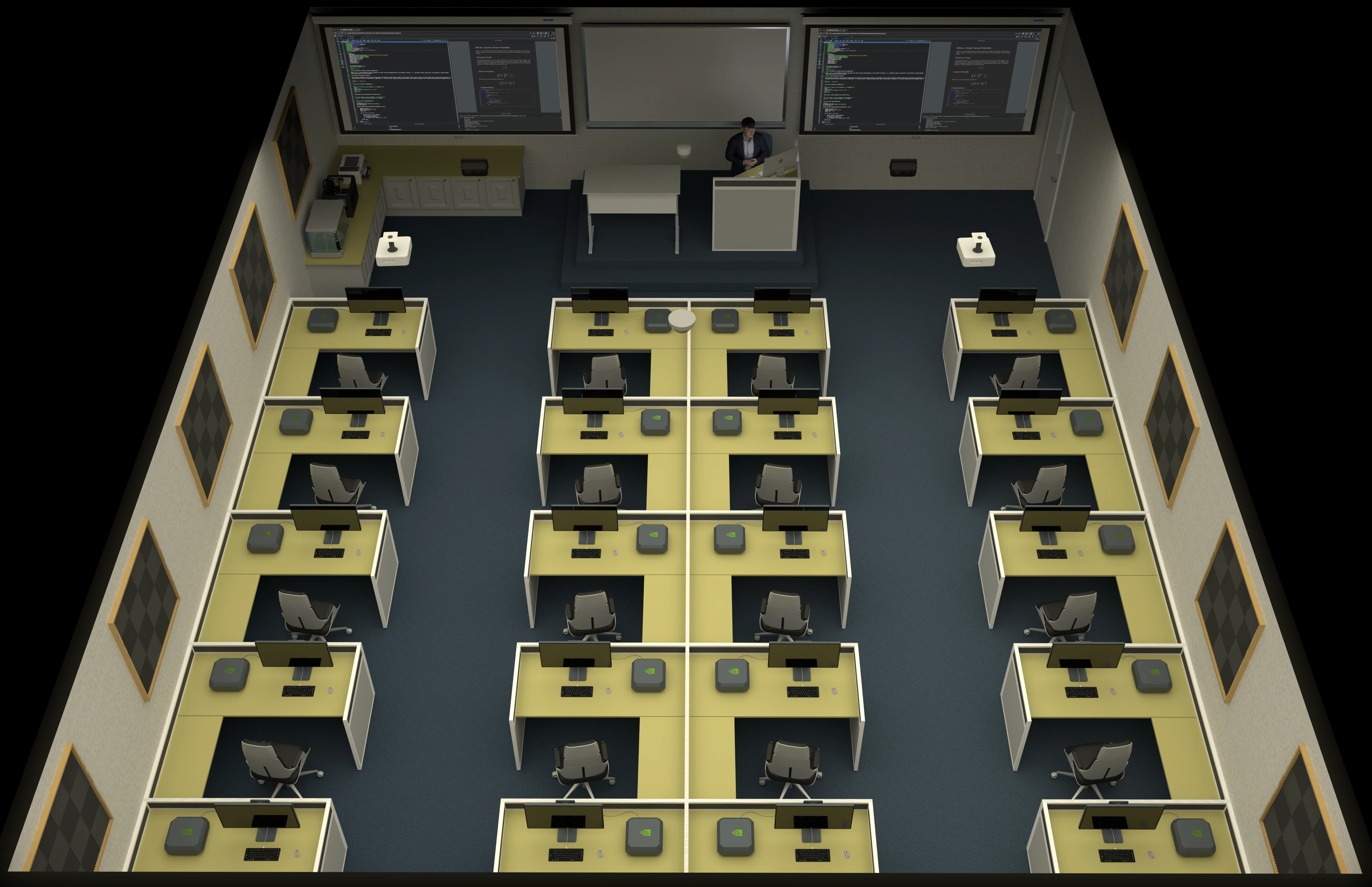
3D model of cubicles in the classroom to get power to the desk and computers in the classroom for a computational education

A cubicle is an enclosed office that is separated from neighboring workspaces, with partitions that are usually 5–6 feet (1.5–1.8 m) tall. Its purpose is to isolate office workers and managers from the sights and noises of an open workspace so that they may concentrate with fewer distractions. Cubicles are composed of modular elements such as walls, work surfaces, overhead bins, drawers, and shelving, which can be configured depending on the user's needs. Installation is generally performed by trained personnel, although some cubicles allow configuration changes to be performed by users without specific training.

Modern cubicles are usually equipped with a computer, monitor, keyboard and mouse on the work surface. Additionally, cubicles typically have a desk phone. Since many offices use overhead fluorescent lights to illuminate the office, cubicles may or may not have lamps or other additional lighting. Other furniture often found in cubicles includes office chairs and filing cabinets.

The office cubicle was created by designer Robert Propst in Scottsdale, AZ for Herman Miller, and released in 1967 under the name "Action Office II". Although cubicles are often seen as being symbolic of work in a modern office setting due to their uniformity and blandness, they afford the employee a greater degree of privacy and personalization than in previous work environments, which often consisted of desks lined up in rows within an open room. They do so at a lower cost than individual, private offices. In some office cubicle workspaces, employees can decorate the walls of their cubicle with posters, pictures and other items.

A cubicle is also called a cubicle desk, office cubicle, cubicle workstation, or simply a cube. An office filled with cubicles is sometimes called a sea of cubicles, and additionally called pods (such as 4-pod or 8-pod of cubes) or a cube farm. Although humorous, the phrase usually has negative connotations. Cube farms are found in multiple industries including technology, insurance, and government offices.

== Etymology ==
The term cubicle comes from the Latin cubiculum, for bed chamber. It was used in English as early as the 15th century. It eventually came to be used for small chambers of all sorts, and for small rooms or study spaces with partitions which do not reach to the ceiling. Like the older carrel desk, a cubicle seeks to give a degree of privacy to the user while taking up minimal space in a large or medium-sized room.

A satirical joke in the 1870 edition of Punch, or the London Charivari magazine uses "cubicle" in the context of an advertisement for a college dormitory - "The dormitories separate cubicles." The joke appears to ridicule the overly studious word, asking, "But stay, what is a cubicle? Did we ever sleep in a cubicle? No; we should as soon have thought of slumber in a bicycle." The article goes on to explain the Latin origin of the word "cubicle" and its definition.

In 1879, the word "cubicle" appeared in reference to electrical engineering, referring to what is today known as electrical enclosures for switchgears and circuit breakers.

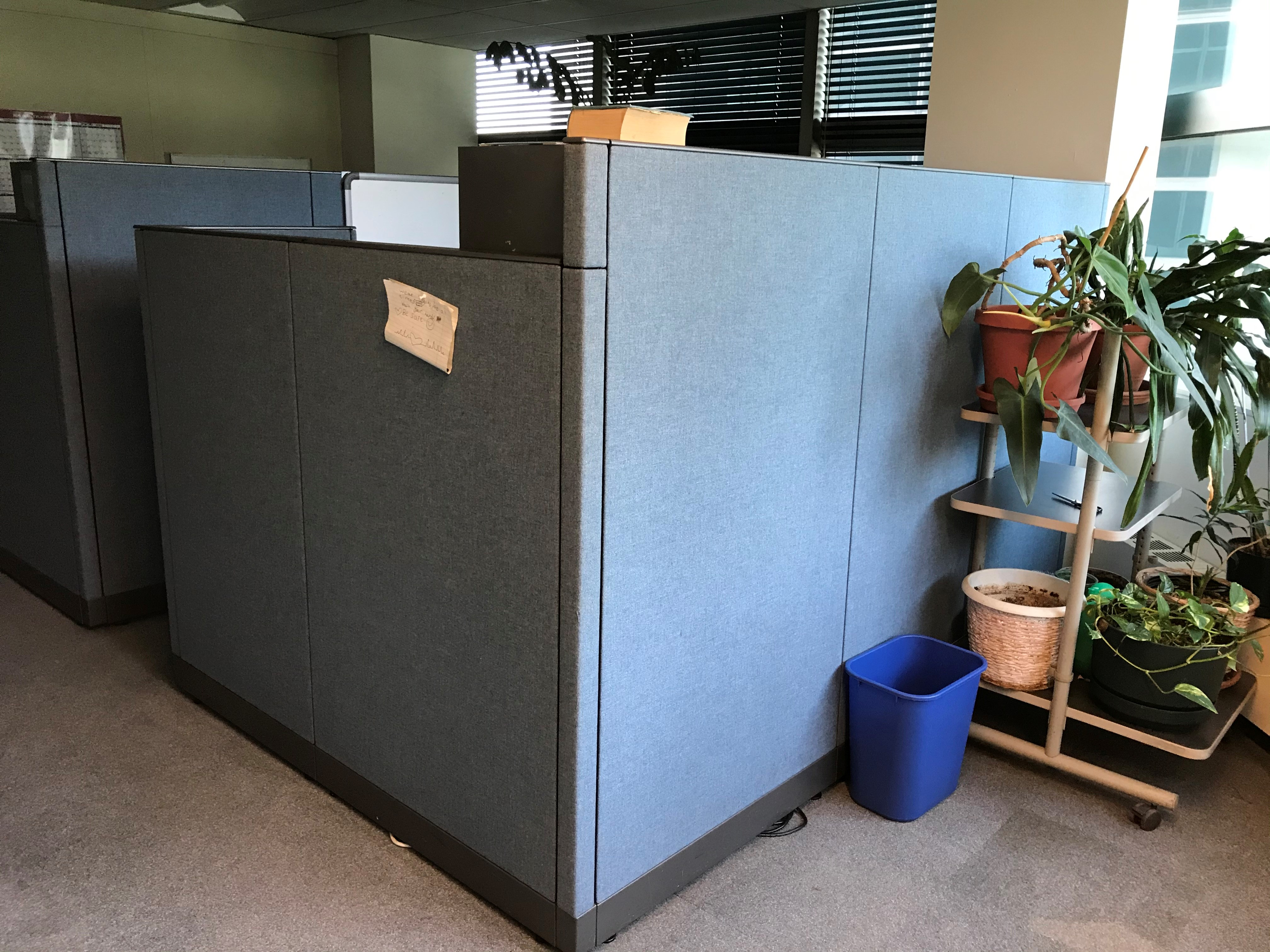
A cubicle in an urban high rise setting

== History ==
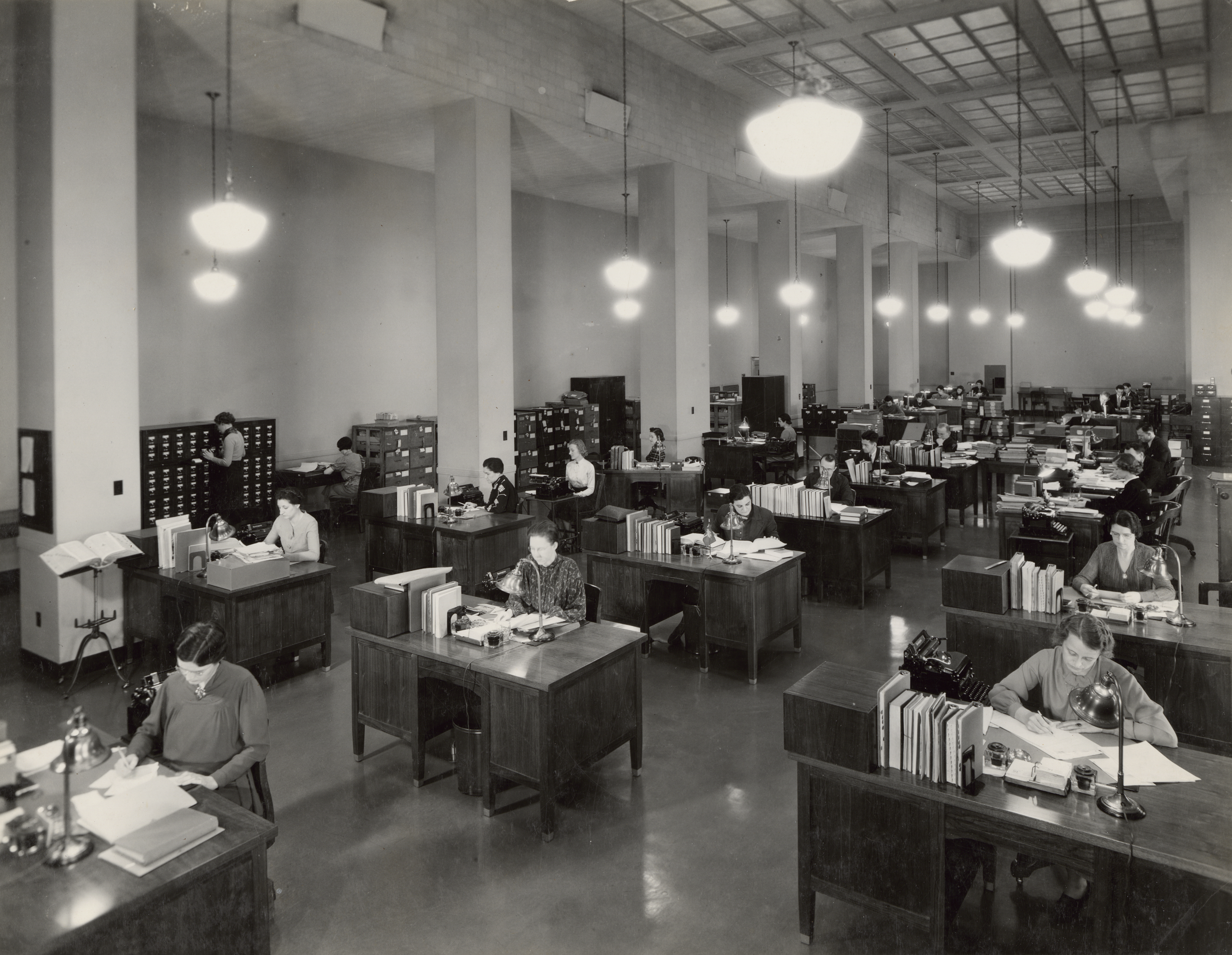
Before cubicles: open office with desks arranged in rows, 1937

Prior to the widespread adoption of cubicles beginning in the 1960s, office workers often worked at desks arranged in rows in an open room, where they were exposed to the sounds and activity of those working around them.

=== Action Office I ===
In 1960, Herman Miller founded the Herman Miller Research Corporation. The corporation's first major project was an evaluation of the "office" as it had evolved during the 20th Century, and in particular, how it functioned in the 1960s.

Propst concluded from his studies that during the 20th century the office environment had changed substantially, particularly in relation to the amount of information being processed. The amount of information an employee had to analyze, organize, and maintain had increased dramatically. Despite this, the basic layout of the corporate office had remained largely unchanged. Propst's studies suggested that an open environment actually reduced communication between employees, and impeded personal initiative. On this, Propst commented "One of the regrettable conditions of present day offices is the tendency to provide a formula kind of sameness for everyone." In addition, the employees were suffering from long hours of sitting in one position.

In 1964, Propst and his colleague George Nelson created the Action Office I (AO-1) and introduced it in the Herman Miller lineup. AO-1 was a failure. Despite its shortcomings, Nelson won the Alcoa Award for the design without crediting Propst.

=== First appearances ===
One of the first offices to incorporate the "Action Office" design was in the Federal Reserve Bank of New York.

=== Action Office II ===
Following the poor sales of Action Office 1, Propst and Nelson decided that Action Office I had failed. The AO-2 lineup met with unprecedented success. In 1978, "Action Office II" was renamed simply "Action Office", and by 2005 had attained sales totaling $5 billion.

Despite the success and his contributing ideas, Nelson criticized the "Action Office II" line. In 1970, he sent a letter to Robert Blaich, Herman Miller's Vice-President for Corporate Design and Communication, in which he described the system's "dehumanizing effect as a working environment.".

=== Internet era ===
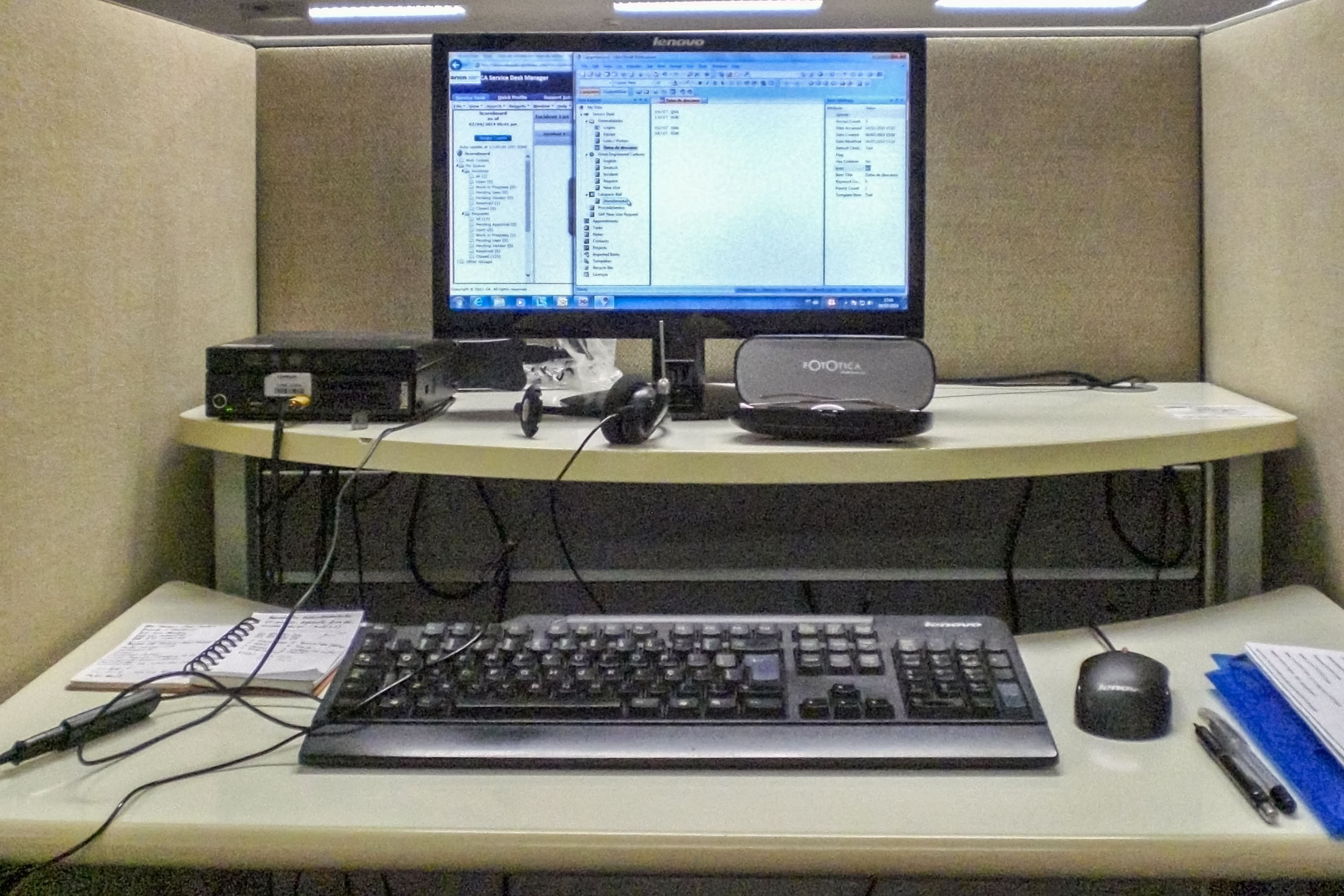
A cubicle in IT company Capgemini's São Paulo office

In 1994 designer Douglas Ball planned and built several iterations of the Clipper or CS-1, a "capsule" desk that resembled the streamlined front fuselage of a fighter plane. Meant as a computer workstation, it had louvers and an integrated ventilation system, as well as a host of built-in features typical of the ergonomic desk. An office space filled with these instead of traditional squarish cubicles would look like a hangar filled with small flight simulators. It was selected for the permanent design collection of the Design Museum in the United Kingdom.

Many cube farms were built during the dotcom boom of 1997-2003. Between 2000 and 2002, IBM partnered with the office furniture manufacturer Steelcase, and researched the software, hardware, and ergonomic aspects of the cubicle of the future (or the office of the future) under the name "Bluespace". They produced several prototypes of this hi-tech multi screened work space and even exhibited one at Walt Disney World. Bluespace offered movable multiple screens inside and outside, a projection system, advanced individual lighting, heating and ventilation controls, and guest-detecting privacy systems.

=== Open-plan offices ===
During the 2000s and 2010s, open plan offices arose again as a modern response to cubicles, inspired by tech companies in Silicon Valley. Though they predate cubicles and were re-popularized by architects including Frank Lloyd Wright in 1939, 21st-century open plans are sometimes described as a "fad." Open plans have negative consequences on employees' productivity, mental health, and health.

In 2020, as a result of the COVID-19 pandemic, open-plan offices such as those in True Manufacturing Co. began to put up plexiglass partitions. Demand was so high and materials scarce the use of glass partitions as a protective screen was also widely used - essentially, once again dividing open plans into cubicles.

== Impact on society ==
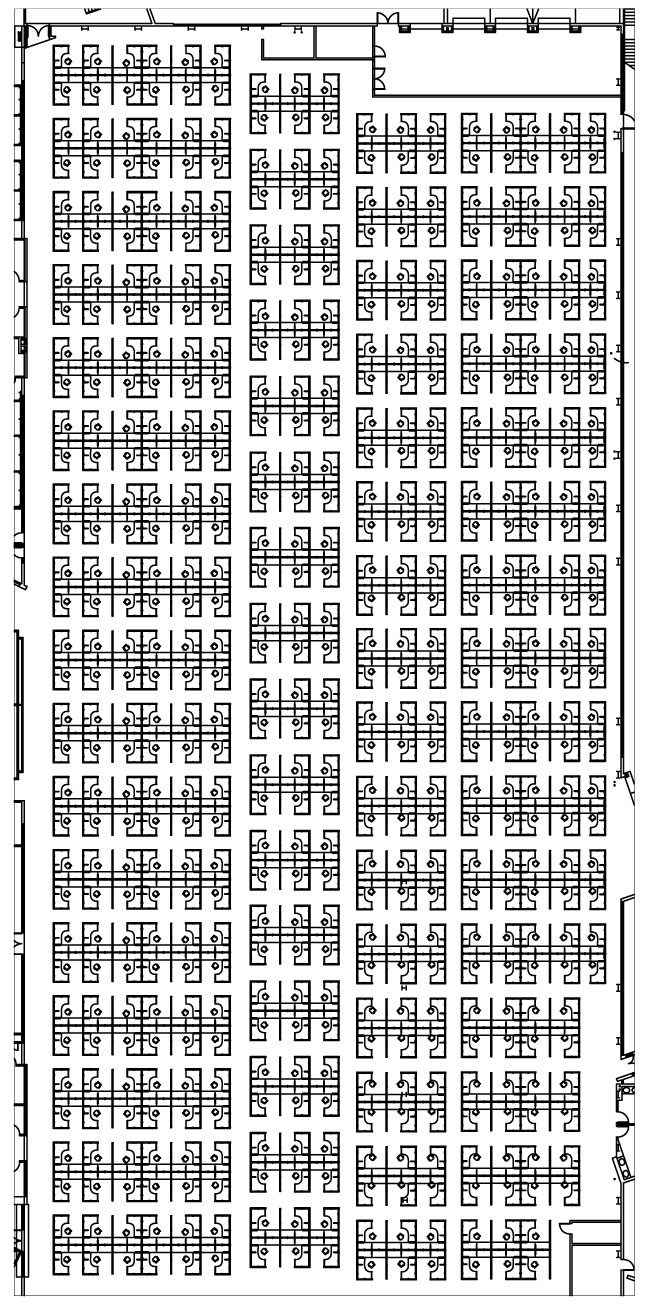
A floor plan showing repetitive, regimented cubicles

It is unlikely that any other office furnishings has had as much of a social impact as the introduction of the office cubicle in the 1960s, though the outcome of the cubicle's arrival is still open to debate.

Author Thomas Hine speculated that the cubicle contributed to breaking the glass ceiling for women in the 1960s. Because women could be excluded from male-dominated open office "bull pens," cubicles allowed women to be promoted into middle management positions without making men uncomfortable.

Writer Geoffrey James of Inc. is also a proponent of cubicles. James argues that cubicles encourage diversity in the workplace, as opposed to open floor plans which he claims favors the socially privileged and creates an uncomfortable environment for others. Therefore, he claims open floor spaces systemically encourage ageism, racism, sexism, and ableism by focusing on young white men as the norm. However, cubicles lead to more overall comfort and therefore more equality in the workplace.

Cultural commentary about cubicles was done in the 1990s and early 2000s. In expensive cities like New York and London, open-floor plans became popular because traditional cubicle or office setups were too costly. In 1989, cartoonist Scott Adams spoke through his comic strip, Dilbert, to satirize cubicle culture. He depicted an IT company employee who works in a cubicle. In 2001, he teamed up with the design company IDEO to create "Dilbert's Ultimate Cubicle". It included both whimsical aspects, a modular approach and attention to usually-neglected ergonomic details like the change in light orientation as the day advances.

In 1991, Douglas Coupland has coined the phrase "veal-fattening pen", a deprecation of cubicles in his novel Generation X: Tales for an Accelerated Culture. In 1999, cubicles were depicted in sci-fi movie The Matrix, in which a programmer who is moonlighting as a hacker spends his days in a drab cubicle. The 1999 comedy Office Space depicts a bored group of IT workers who work in cubicles.

== See also ==
- List of desk forms and types
- Architectural acoustics
- Sound masking
- Carrel desk - desks with small wall dividers

== Bibliography ==
- Adams, Scott. What Do You call a Sociopath in a Cubicle?: (Answer, a Coworker) Kansas City, Missouri: Andrews McMeel Pub., 2002.
- Blunden, Bill. Cube Farm. Berkeley: Apress, 2004.
- Duffy, Francis. Colin Cave. John Worthington, editors. Planning Office Space. London: The Architectural Press Ltd., 1976.
- Inkeles, Gordon. Ergonomic Living: How to Create a User-Friendly Home and Office. New York: Simon and Schuster, 1994.
- Klein, Judy Graf. The Office Book. New York: Facts on File Inc., 1982.
- Schlosser, Julie. "Cubicles: The great mistake." CNNMoney.com, 2006
- Saval, Nikil. Cubed: A Secret History of the Workplace, Doubleday, 2014.
