= Office space planning =

Process of organizing workspace layout

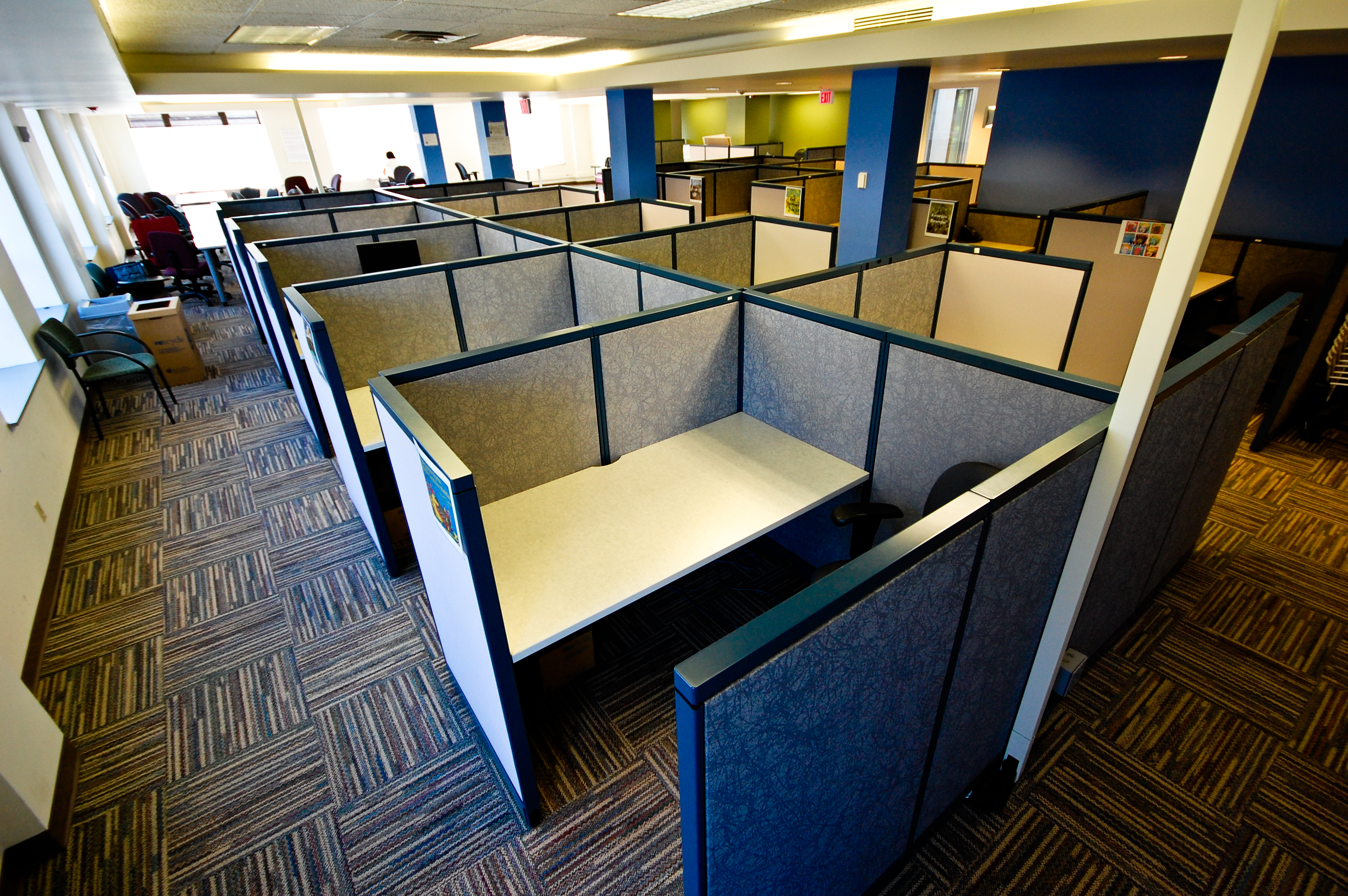
Cubicles in a former coworking space in Portland, Oregon

Office space planning is the process of organizing the workplace layout, furniture, and office functions to work effectively together for employees, while using space efficiently. Floor plans should consider the workgroup function, building codes and regulations, lighting, teaming requirements, inter-communication and storage, as well as zoning for employee workstations, task space needs, support rooms and reception areas to make the best use of available space. Optimising office spaces with effective space planning can aid circulation and productivity and improve workplace wellness, as well as the health and safety of occupants.

== Business needs ==
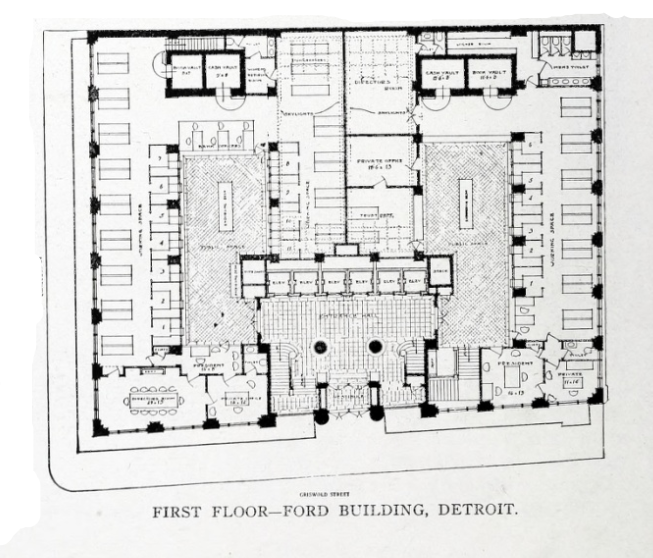
Ford Building (Detroit) 1st floor plan

Office space planning refers to optimizing the building structure layout to fulfill the needs of the organization while taking into consideration the business plans for the organization.

Research is sometimes required to plan office layouts strategically, often done by identifying the factors that potentially affect space occupants — collecting and analyzing data in regards to how space is used, current building standards in furniture or ergonomic furniture, future demand of space or growth between business units.

The objective is to channel resources to provide the right workplace environment for conducting the core business activities on a cost-effective and value for money basis. As it involves determining the requirements of the user and the business, designing the workplace for accommodating these requirements and maintaining the provision of these requirements through the life cycle of the workplace. (Muir, 2003)

For example: call centers to require an undertaking of their business 'on-screen' and require small desk areas per staff member, minimum document storage, and may have limited requirements for photocopying facilities and printing. In contrast, companies handling paper-based documentation will require larger desks for their staff, room for records, archive facilities, photocopying, and printing facilities close to hand. Some companies require space planning to view analyzed with flexibility due to housing distinct business needs such as laboratory, design, and research spaces. Some facility space planners must also plan for storage solutions within a corporate setting for organizations with heavy product use.

=== Office peacocking ===
Office peacocking refers to a strategic workplace redesign to incentivize in-person work by making the office more engaging and inviting through ergonomics, aesthetics, and amenities. Office peacocking aesthetics may include sectional sofas, deep-pile rugs, and large video monitors. Office peacocking arose in conjunction with return to office policies post COVID.

== Accommodation standards ==
Organizations often have a policy on the minimum standards of accommodation for each staff grade. Administration staff may work in open plan offices whereas managers may have individual offices, sized on a seniority basis. In open plan, offices screens are sometimes used between desks to reduce noise and provide an element of privacy.

There are life safety requirements mandated by legislation which include rules for fire evacuation plans, location for fire extinguishers, sprinkler systems, unblocked exits, adequate passage width, building fire alarm systems, non-combustible, flame resistant furnishings and unobstructed exit ways. (Rondeau et al 1995)

Ergonomics are a criterion taken into account by space planners for achieving maximum resource efficiency and higher productivity rates. Ergonomics is concerned with biologic and engineering data and techniques to develop solutions for the interface of the worker and workplace. Ergonomics is defined by (Cotts, 1999). Rondeau et al (1995) as a design to specifically fit human dimensions and respond to functional requirements. Solutions include adjustable equipment, furniture, and accessories.

Developing and implementing space standards is one of the key responsibilities of any space management department in any organization. (Owen, 1993) The space standard governs the number of meters allotted to each staff in the organization. Considers the amount of space for workspace set up, local storage and access.

Provisions for the disabled are other important accommodation standards. Organizations are required to adhere to the Americans with Disabilities Act. This regulation requires all areas available to the public to be accessible to and usable by individuals with disabilities. (Owen, 1993) Spacing in the building would be affected due to the provision of handicap requirements including parking spaces, building entrances, restrooms, workstations and elevators (Rondeau et al, 1995)

== Space planning ==
The grouping of staff in teams often provides the best option for inter-communication and/or supervision and is a key factor in office layout design. However, where space is at a premium it may be difficult to accommodate a workgroup in a given area, and the solution often involves making space by moving others. These types of moves may be complex and disruptive as there is often a chain of events involved. Space planning could include taking account migration between buildings and different neighborhoods. It is business critical to make arrangements for possible work interruptions. Space planners must account for possible growth within business units as well as guidelines and regulations for building.

Space Planning in corporate organizations has to plan with accordance with zoning requirements to where the building is being used. (Molnar 1983) Space planners need to have a complete set of information about the building to be successful planners. Physical constraints may impact the successful planning of workspace. (Building height, column spacing, finishes of floors, type of wall construction, capacities of elevators, fixture types, illumination levels. (Molnar 1983) Zoning is a term used in city and regional planning to regulate the practice of land use and the kind of activities conducted on sites based on mapped zones. Regulates the use of building and density allowed, the location of building on the lot, lot coverage, parking, and similar aspects.

Financial factors can affect successful implementing of space planning. The budget allocated for office workplace programming, cost of usable space, an allowable budget that should not be exceeded for a project, cost incurred after moving in (for example, cost due to changes in placements of partitions, lighting/ layout modification, repairs, window tint, etc.) Cost of providing one work station for each employee. (Bogers 2008)

Space planning is a discipline concerned with translating the space needs of an organization onto the floor plates of the building and producing a workplace environment suitable for the organization to gain a return on its investment. Space management, on the other hand, is concerned with providing the delivery of space services and the management of the completed space plan. In practice, office space in many organizations may be provided in the absence of considering work environment settings, space planning methodologies, technology, innovative and creative ways of operating at the workplace.

== Services ==
Each desk in an office may require a telephone and computer. In large offices the power and data cables may be run under a raised floor or above in a suspended ceiling, to the desk. Another alternative in smaller offices is to use dado trunking around the wall. Other alternatives are to use ceiling power poles which can assist space planning of desks away from perimeter walls

== Partitions ==
Open plan offices are often divided up into smaller offices for managers, meeting rooms, etc. When this happens the designer has to take into account several factors including:

- Heating/cooling zoning
- Ventilation
- Lighting and light switches
- Emergency lighting
- Small power
- Voice and data cabling
- Fire alarms
- Fire stopping
- Fire escape routes
- Noise/acoustics

== Churn rate ==
In many organizations, office layouts are subject to frequent changes. This process is referred to as churn rate, expressed as the percentage of the staff moved during a year.

== Statutory requirements ==
Statutory requirements related to office layouts will vary in different countries but examples may include the minimum amount of space to be provided per staff member; fire safety arrangements; lighting levels; signage; ventilation; temperature control and welfare arrangements.

== Staff welfare facilities ==
Office staff require access to basic welfare facilities in an office such as toilets and drinking water. Consideration may also be given to vending, catering or a place where staff can make a drink and take a break from their desk.
