= DePree =

DePree is a surname. It may refer to:

- D. J. DePree, American businessman and founder of Herman Miller; father of Max
- Hopwood DePree, American actor, director, producer, and screenwriter
- Hugo de Pree (1870–1943), British Army officer
- James DePree (1879–1972), American football player and football and baseball coach
- Max De Pree, American businessman and writer; son of D. J.
