= George Nelson (designer) =

American industrial designer (1908–1986)

- Born: May 29, 1908; Hartford, Connecticut, U.S.
- Died: March 5, 1986 (aged 77); New York City, U.S.
- Education: Yale University
- Occupations: Industrial designer, architect, author, editor, teacher
- Years active: 1936–1986
- Title: Director of Design, Herman Miller, (1947–1972)
- Movement: American modernism
- Spouses: Frances Hollister (m. 1932, divorced) Jacqueline Griffiths (m. 1959)

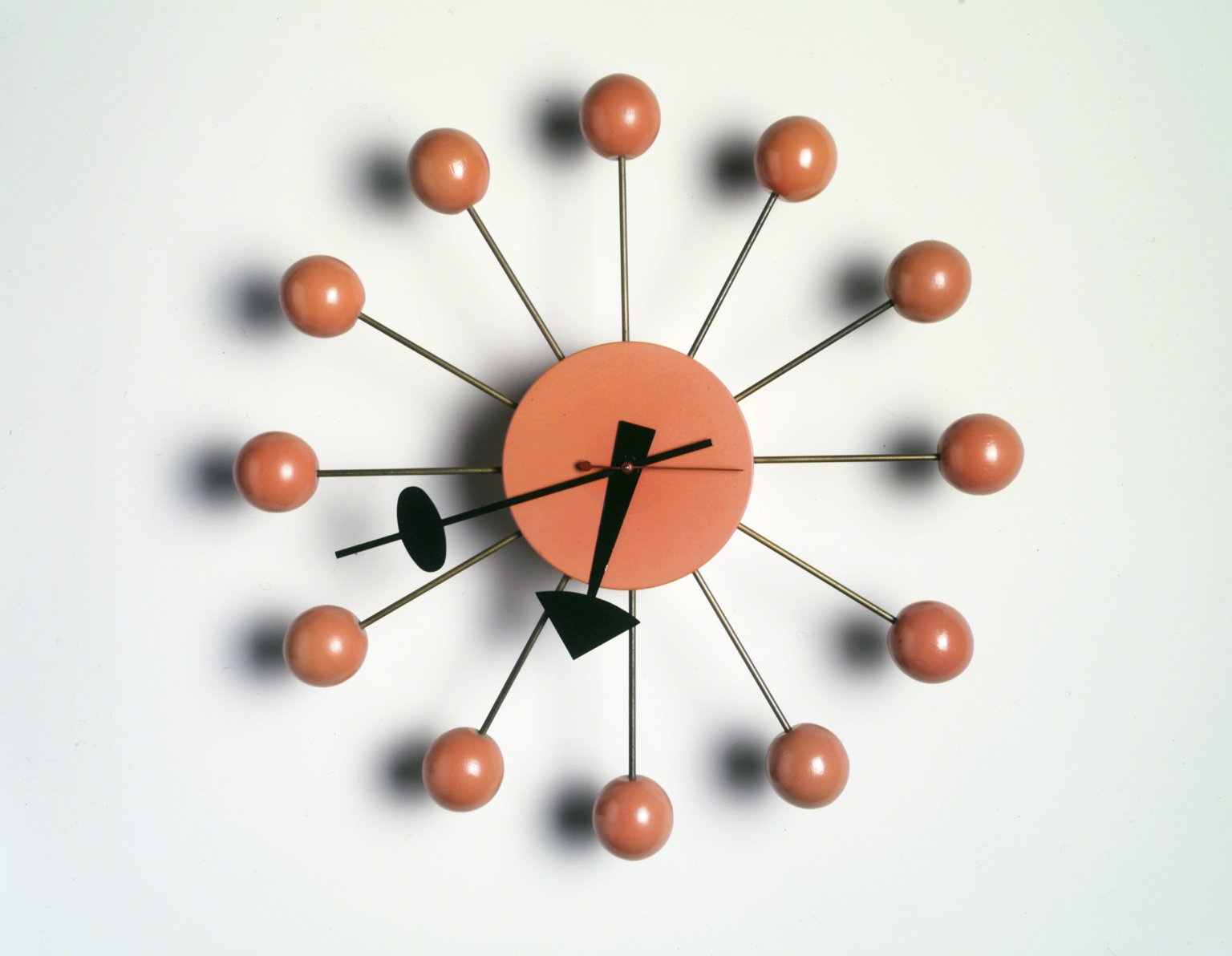
"Ball" Wall Clock, 1948–1969 Brooklyn Museum

George Nelson (29 May 1908 – 5 March 1986) was an American industrial designer. While lead designer for the Herman Miller furniture company, Nelson and his design studio, George Nelson Associates, designed 20th-century modernist furniture. He is considered a founder of American modernist design.

== Early life ==
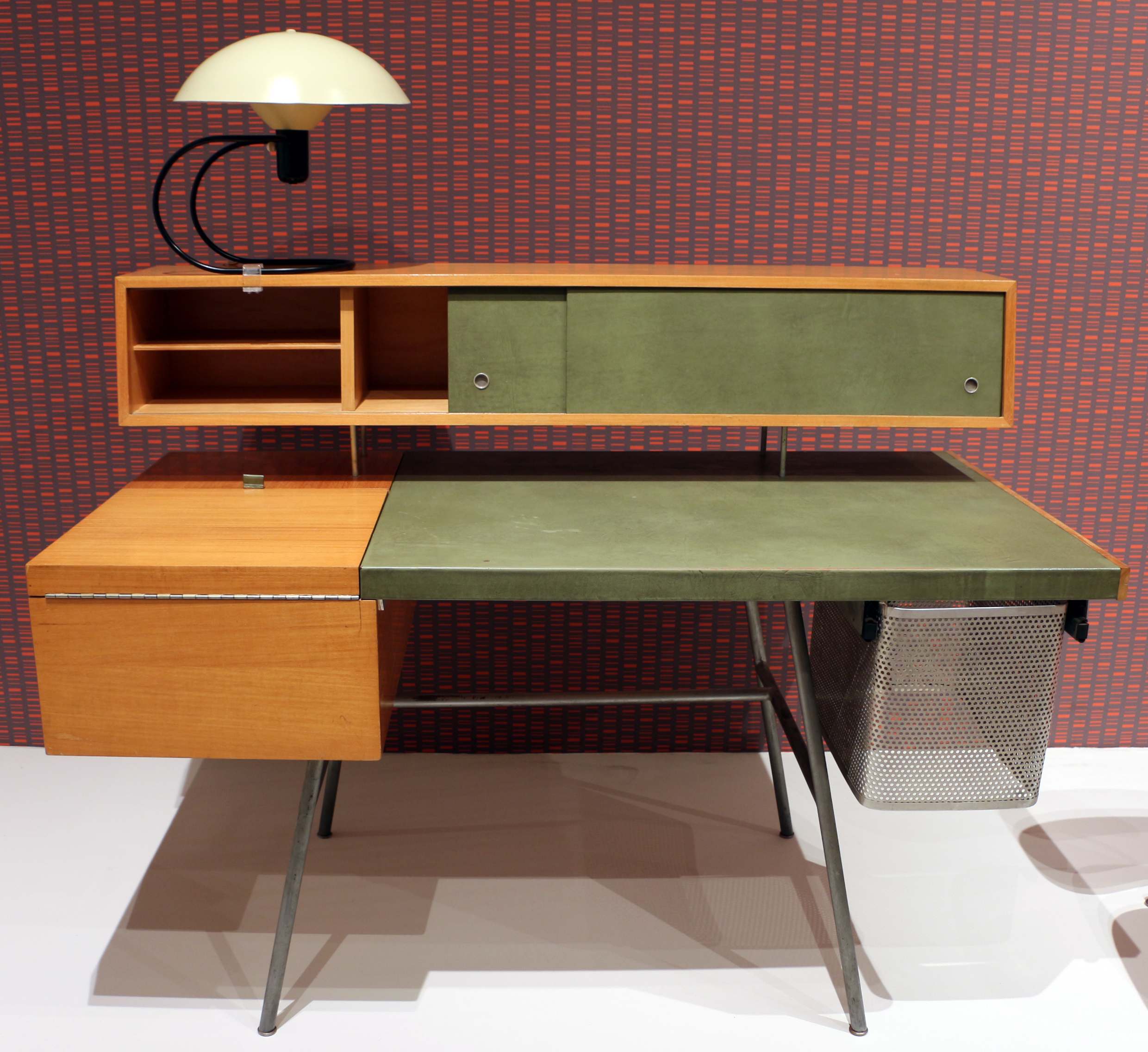
George Nelson & Associates for Miller Furniture Company, desk n. 4658, made in Zeeland, MI, 1946

Nelson was born on May 29, 1908, in Hartford, Connecticut, to Jewish parents Simeon Nelson and Lillian Canterow Nelson. His parents owned a drugstore. Nelson graduated from Hartford Public High School in 1924, and thereafter attended Yale University. He did not originally set out to become an architect; he happened upon the architecture school at Yale, when he ducked into a building during a rainstorm, in order to get out of the rain. Walking through the building, he came upon an exhibit of students' works entitled "A Cemetery Gateway".

Nelson met with some early recognition while still an undergraduate, when he was published in Pencil Points and Architecture magazines. During his final year at Yale, he was hired by the architecture firm Adams and Prentice as a draftsman.

In 1928, he graduated with a degree in architecture. In 1929, Nelson was hired as a Teacher's Assistant while pursuing his second bachelor's degree at Yale. He received a degree in Fine Arts in 1931.

The next year, while preparing for the Paris Prize competition, he won the Rome Prize, a fellowship that allowed him to study architecture in Rome for two years with a healthy stipend and accommodations in a palace.

While based in Rome, Nelson traveled through Europe where he met a number of the modernist pioneers, whom he interviewed for articles for Pencil Points magazine. While being interviewed by Nelson, Mies van der Rohe asked about Frank Lloyd Wright, whom Nelson was embarrassed to say he did not know much about. Years later, however, Nelson would work with Wright on a special issue of Architectural Forum which catalyzed Wright's comeback from relative obscurity.

While in Rome Nelson married Frances Hollister. A few years later, he returned to the United States to devote himself to writing. Through his articles in Pencil Points he introduced the work of Walter Gropius, Mies van der Rohe, Le Corbusier, and Gio Ponti to North America.

== 1935–1944: Design writing ==
In 1935, Nelson joined Architectural Forum, where he was first associate editor (1935–1943), and later consulting editor (1944–1949). There, he defended the modernist principles, arguing against colleagues who, as "industrial designers", made too many concessions to the commercial forces of the industry.

Nelson believed the work of a designer should be to better the world. In his view, nature was already perfect, but man ruined it by making things that didn't follow the rules of nature. "The contemporary architect, cut off from symbols, ornament and meaningful elaborations of structural form, all of which earlier periods processed in abundance, has desperately chased every functional requirement, every change in sight or ornamentation, every technical improvement, to provide some basis for starting his work. Where the limitations were most rigorous, as for example in a factory, or in a skyscraper where every inch had to yield its profit, there the designers were happiest and the results most satisfying but; let a religious belief or a social ideal replace the cubic foot costs or radiation losses, and nothing happened. There is not a single modern church in the entire country that is comparable to a first-rate cafeteria, as far as solving the problem is concerned." At this point, Nelson's career still mainly involved writing for architecture magazines and not actually designing the solutions to modern living that he would later become famous for.

By 1940, Nelson had become known for several innovative concepts. In his post-war book Tomorrow's House, co-authored with Henry Wright, he introduced the concept of the "family room", and the "storage wall". The storage wall was a recessed, built-in bookcase or shelving between the empty space of two walls. The concept was developed while writing the section on storage, as neither Nelson nor Wright were able to write enough for their publisher's liking. Nelson then posed the question,"What's inside the wall?", and realized that the space between walls was not utilized. The idea was initially published in Architectural Forum and then republished in Life in 1945. The book was a commercial success and made it onto the New York Times bestseller list.

== 1945–1954: Herman Miller ==
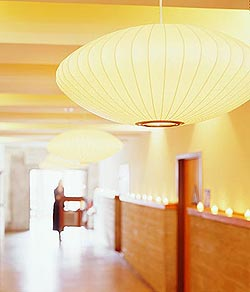
The bubble lamp, one of Nelson's designs.

In 1945, the Herman Miller furniture company was producing mostly conventional, wood-based designs. After reading Tomorrow's House D.J. Depree, the Chairman of Herman Miller, selected Nelson to be the company's next Director of Design, despite Nelson having no experience designing furniture. Depree was more interested in Nelson's insight into the best way to make furniture innovative and useful. Nelson was offered a contract that allowed him the freedom to work outside of Herman Miller, and to use designs from other architects that Nelson had worked with. He became the Director of Design for Herman Miller in 1947, and held the position until 1972. The first Herman Miller catalog produced by Nelson was released in 1945. Over the following years it would include some of the most iconic home furnishings of the 20th century. Ray and Charles Eames, Harry Bertoia, Richard Schultz, Donald Knorr, and Isamu Noguchi all worked for Herman Miller, under Nelson's supervision. Although both Bertoia and Noguchi later expressed regrets about their involvement, it became a successful period for the company, and for George Nelson.

== 1955–1980s: George Nelson Associates, Inc. ==
Using the money he earned as Director of Design for Herman Miller, in 1947 Nelson opened a design studio in New York City. On October 26, 1955, he incorporated it into George Nelson Associates, Inc., and moved to 251 Park Avenue South. The studio was successful in bringing together many of the top designers of the era, who were soon designing for Herman Miller under the George Nelson label. Among the noted designers who worked for George Nelson Associates, Inc. were Irving Harper, George Mulhauser (designer of the Coconut Chair), Robert Brownjohn (designer of the sets for the James Bond film Goldfinger), Gordon Chadwick, Bill Renwick, Suzanne Sekey, John Svezia, Ernest Farmer, Tobias O'Mara, Ronald Beckman (designer of the Sling Sofa), George Tscherny, (who designed the Herman Miller advertisements), Dan Lewis, Lance Wyman, and John Pile. With his studio, Nelson enacted new practices for the involvement of design in all aspects of the company, pioneering the practice of corporate image management, graphic programs, and signage. By the time the company closed in the mid-1980s George Nelson Associates, Inc. had worked with most of the Fortune 500 companies. George Nelson's architectural projects included what he dubbed "The Colombian Garden of Health", a 200-bed tertiary care hospital in Bogota, Colombia, commissioned by the Fundacion Santa Fe de Bogota.

In 1959, he remarried to Jacqueline Griffiths. That same year, he served as the lead designer for the American National Exhibition in Moscow.

=== The office cubicle ===
Nelson worked with the Herman Miller Research Corporation during the mid 1960s. It was in close proximity to the University of Michigan campus. The company's purpose was to examine changes in the use of office furniture that had taken place during the 20th century, but not the furniture itself. After consulting with experts in psychology, anthropology, and various other fields, Robert Propst created the Action Office I line, which was executed by Nelson's studio, and first appeared in Herman Miller's 1964 catalog. For designing the Action Office I Nelson was awarded the prestigious Alcoa award. The Action Office I line was not a success, and Nelson was removed from the project. Propst then created the Action Office II, which is better known today as the office cubicle. Despite the "Action Office II" line becoming Herman Miller's most successful project, George Nelson disowned himself from any connection with the project. In 1970 he sent a letter to Robert Blaich, who had become Herman Miller's Vice-President for Corporate Design and Communication, in which he described the system's "dehumanizing effect as a working environment." He summed up his feeling by saying:

"One does not have to be an especially perceptive critic to realize that AO II is definitely not a system which produces an environment gratifying for people in general. But it is admirable for planners looking for ways of cramming in a maximum number of bodies, for "employees" (as against individuals), for "personnel," corporate zombies, the walking dead, the silent majority. A large market."

Scornful as he may have been, Nelson was right that there turned out to be a "larger market" for AO II. By 2005 total sales had reached $5 billion.

== 1980s: Retirement and death ==
Nelson retired with the closing of his studio in the mid-1980s. In 1984, he became a scholar in residence at the Cooper-Hewitt Museum. He died in New York City in 1986.

== Influence and legacy ==
The George Nelson Associates, Inc. catalog, and exhibition designs for Herman Miller, made modernism the most important driving force in the company. From his start in the mid-forties until the mid-eighties George Nelson Associates, Inc. partnered with most of the modernist designers of the time. This was both the result of Nelson's time as a magazine editor, and because of Nelson's writing. His skill as a writer helped legitimize and stimulate the field of industrial design by contributing to the creation of Industrial Design magazine in 1953. Nelson wrote extensively, published several books, and organized conferences like the Aspen design gatherings, where for more than 30 years he was the guiding force. In 1971, he received a grant from the Graham Foundation for his project "Hidden Cities". One of George Nelson's areas of interest was the reduction of pollution. Through his attempts to reduce all forms of pollution, including visual, audio, and chemical, Nelson pioneered the idea of the outdoor shopping mall, first using the idea in a proposal for the city plan of Austin, Texas, which was not used.

In 2008, the Vitra Design Museum in Weil am Rhein, Germany, held a retrospective of Nelson's work to celebrate his 100th birthday. Design critic Alice Rawsthorn, covering the retrospective for The New York Times, argued that Nelson's contributions have been unfairly overlooked due to his association with the cubicle and jokey 1950s objects. "Blaming Nelson for the soullessness of today's open-plan offices seems as unfair as slating Le Corbusier for other architects' sloppily designed skyscrapers, or Marcel Duchamp for every lazy piece of conceptual art," she wrote. "[Nelson] championed the importance of values in design, which he saw as a catalyst for social change."

=== Attribution ===
In recent years it has become known that many of the designs George Nelson accepted credit for were actually the work of other designers employed at his studios. Examples of this include the Marshmallow sofa, which was actually designed by Irving Harper. Propst did not receive credit for Action Office. John Pile, a designer who worked for Nelson in the 1950s, commented about this practice; "George's attitude was that it was okay for individual designers to be given credit in trade publications, but for the consumer world, the credit should always be to the firm, not the individual. He didn't always follow through on that policy though."

In an interview in Metropolis in 2001, Irving Harper also commented on this practice: "...there always had to be one name associated with the work. We couldn't just spread it around… that's fine. I'm grateful to George for what he did for me. While he was alive, I made no demands whatsoever, but now that he's gone, whenever the Marshmallow Sofa is referred to as a 'George Nelson design', it sort of gets to me. I don't go out of my way to set things right, but if anybody asks me who designed it, I'm perfectly happy to tell them."

== Designs ==
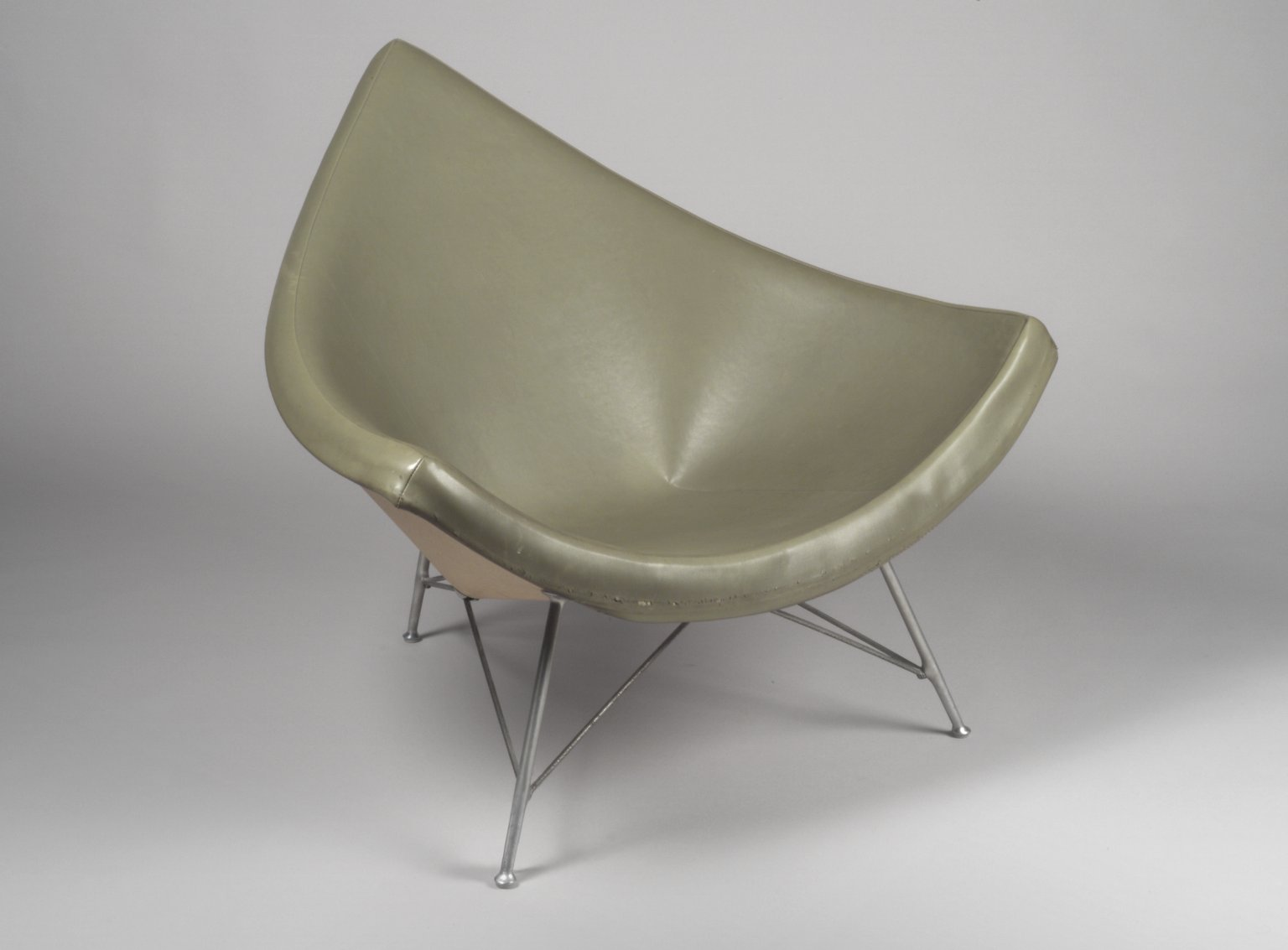
"Coconut" Chair, Brooklyn Museum collection (1958)

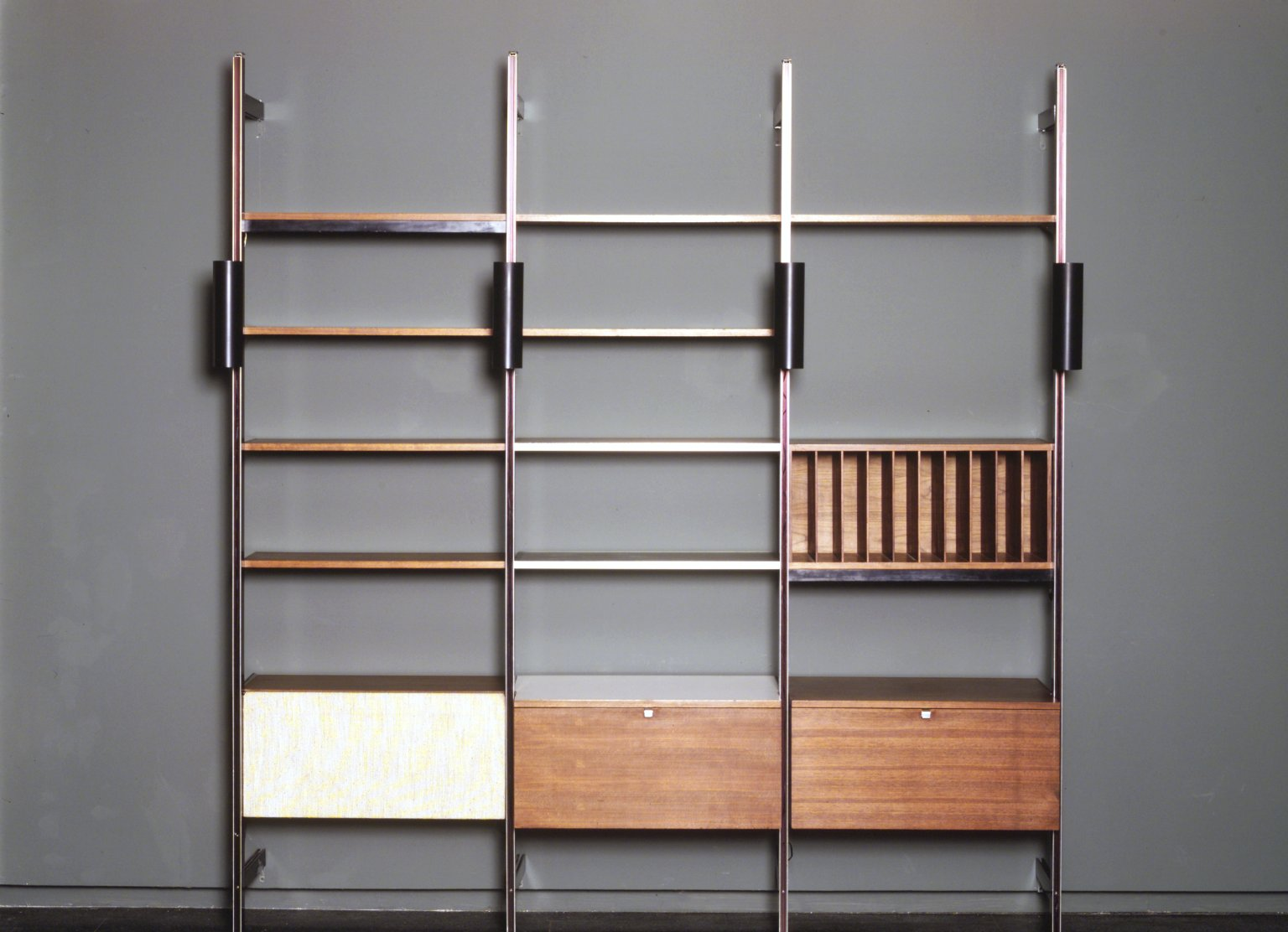
Comprehensive Storage Unit (1966–1968)

=== Furniture ===
- 1946 Slat Bench a/k/a Platform Bench
- 1946 Basic Cabinet Series (a number of these cabinets were reintroduced by Herman Miller in 2011)
- 1946 Sofas, chairs, settees, and bedroom pieces (all included in the first Herman Miller catalog)
- 1947 Bubble Lamp (previously available from Howard Miller Clock company, then Modernica, but now available as of 2016 from Herman Miller)
- 1950 Ball clock (likely designed by Irving Harper, originally made by Howard Miller, reintroduced by Vitra)
- 1952 Rosewood Group
- 1952 Executive Office Group
- 1954 Miniature Cases
- 1954 Steel-frame Group
- 1954 Nelson End Table (and low coffee table)
- 1955 Flying Duck Chair
- 1955 Coconut Chair # (currently available in black leather only, but without the matching ottoman)
- 1956 Thin Edge Cases (a number of these cabinets were reintroduced by Herman Miller in 2012)
- 1956 Kangaroo Chair
- 1958 Swagged-Leg (a/k/a/ Swag Leg) Group (reintroduced by Herman Miller in 2011)
- 1959 Comprehensive Storage System (CSS)
- 1963 Catenary Group
- 1964 Action Office I (principally designed by Robert Propst)
- 1964 Sling Sofa & coffee table: Sofa made of leather and filled with solid foam cushions, joints held with epoxy for easier/cheaper mass-production and smoother feel. Use of a single welt along the perimeter of the padding for approachable softness. Padding held up by rubber bands for comfort.

His firm, George Nelson Associates, also designed a large series of wall and table clocks for the Howard Miller company, as well as a range of hanging Bubble Lamps, which had plastic membrane-covered wire-form shades, wrought iron fireplace pieces, planters, room dividers, ceiling-mounted "Ribbon Wall," spice cabinets, and many other products that became milestones in the history of a profession that he helped to shape.

A number of the nearly 300 classic wall and table clocks for Howard Miller Clock Company (including the Ball, Kite, Eye, Turbine, Spindle, Petal and Spike clocks, as well as a handful of desk clocks) are currently available from Vitra. Many were designed by Irving Harper (as well as Lucia DeRespinis, Charles Pollock, and others). Subsequently, Vitra has discontinued some of their reproduction clocks based on sales.

All the original clock designs were simply assigned numbers by Howard Miller. Probably the most recognisable of the series, the Ball Clock, was advertised and sold as 'Clock 4755'; the Sunflower Clock as 'Clock 2261'. Several colour variations were available for many of the clocks. The Ball Clock was available in six colour variations, the Sunflower Clock in three. One of the more unusual designs, the Eye Clock ('Clock 2238') was pictured in the original Howard Miller Clock Company brochures in a diagonal position, not horizontal, as would be expected.

=== Fairchild House ===
The 1941 Fairchild House was built for the Airplane manufacturer Sherman Fairchild and was meant to be a "machine for living". The building's architecture was centered on its central courtyard, with all windows (including floor-to-ceiling windows) facing towards it.

== Analysis of work ==
Nelson has been tagged a metadesigner for his progressive thinking of interdisciplinary design, for bringing his primary focus on the process, not the product. However, he was not only unconventional and noncommercial in his presentations, but at times even negative. "...it is the career of an architect who advocated the end of architecture, a furniture designer who imagined rooms without furniture, an urban designer who contemplated the hidden city, an industrial designer who questioned the future of the object and hated the obsession with products."
