= Mirra chair =

Chair design

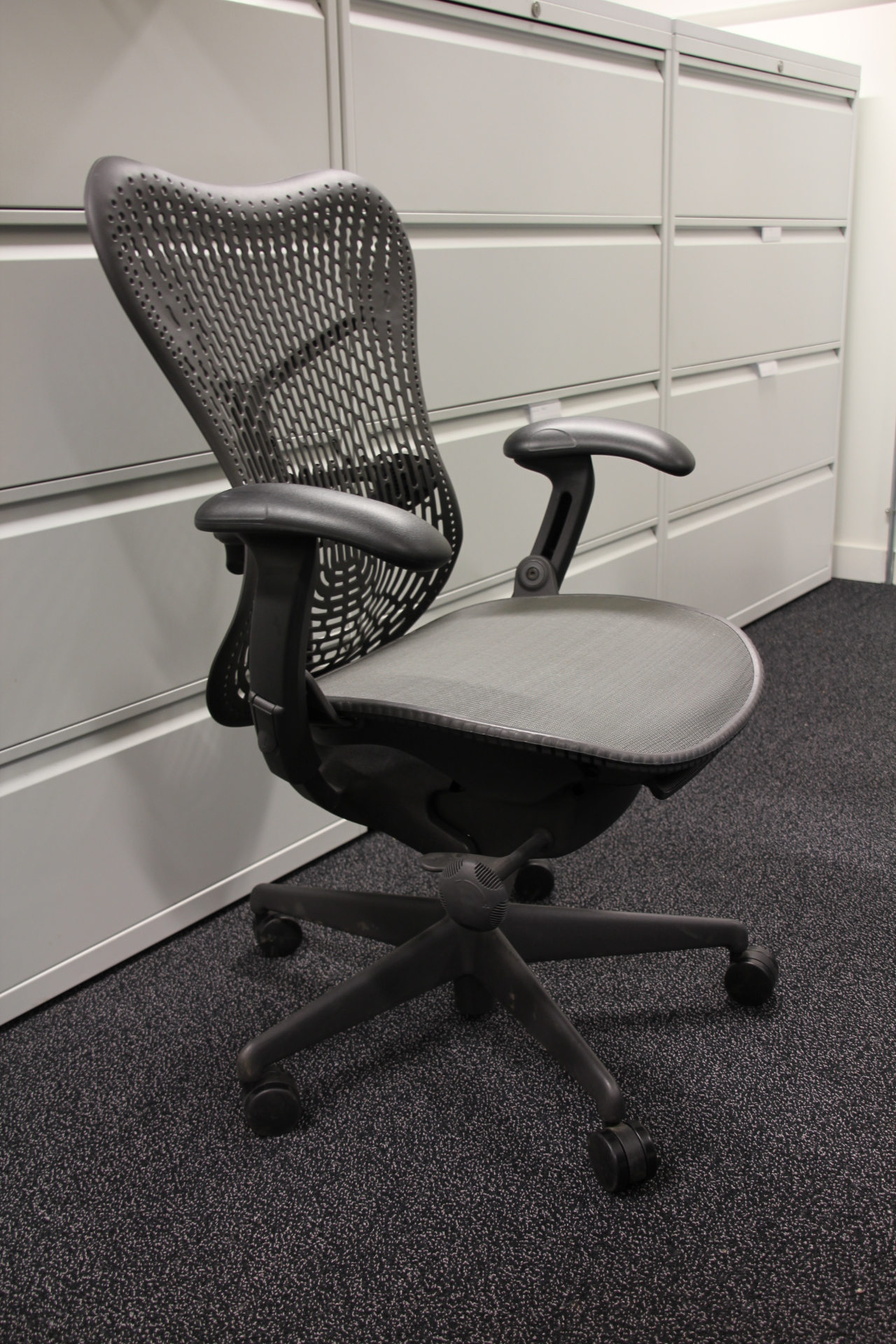
The Mirra chair

The Mirra chair is a style of chair sold by Herman Miller, designed in 2003 by Studio 7.5 in Berlin, Germany.

== Design ==
According to the manufacturer, the chair is made from 42% recycled material, and at the end of its life, it is 96% recyclable by weight. The chair has nine available adjustments intended to aid ergonomics: seat height, seat depth, tilt tension, tilt limiter, forward tilt, arm height, arm width, arm angle, and lumbar tension.

== Awards ==
Mirra holds an Ergonomics Excellence Award (2004) by the Furniture Industry Research Association (FIRA), a silver Industrial Design Excellence Award (2004) by the Industrial Designers Society of America (IDSA), and a silver Cradle to Cradle certification by Business Week magazine, amongst other awards.

== See also ==
- List of chairs
