= Marshmallow sofa =

Sofa designed by Irving Harper

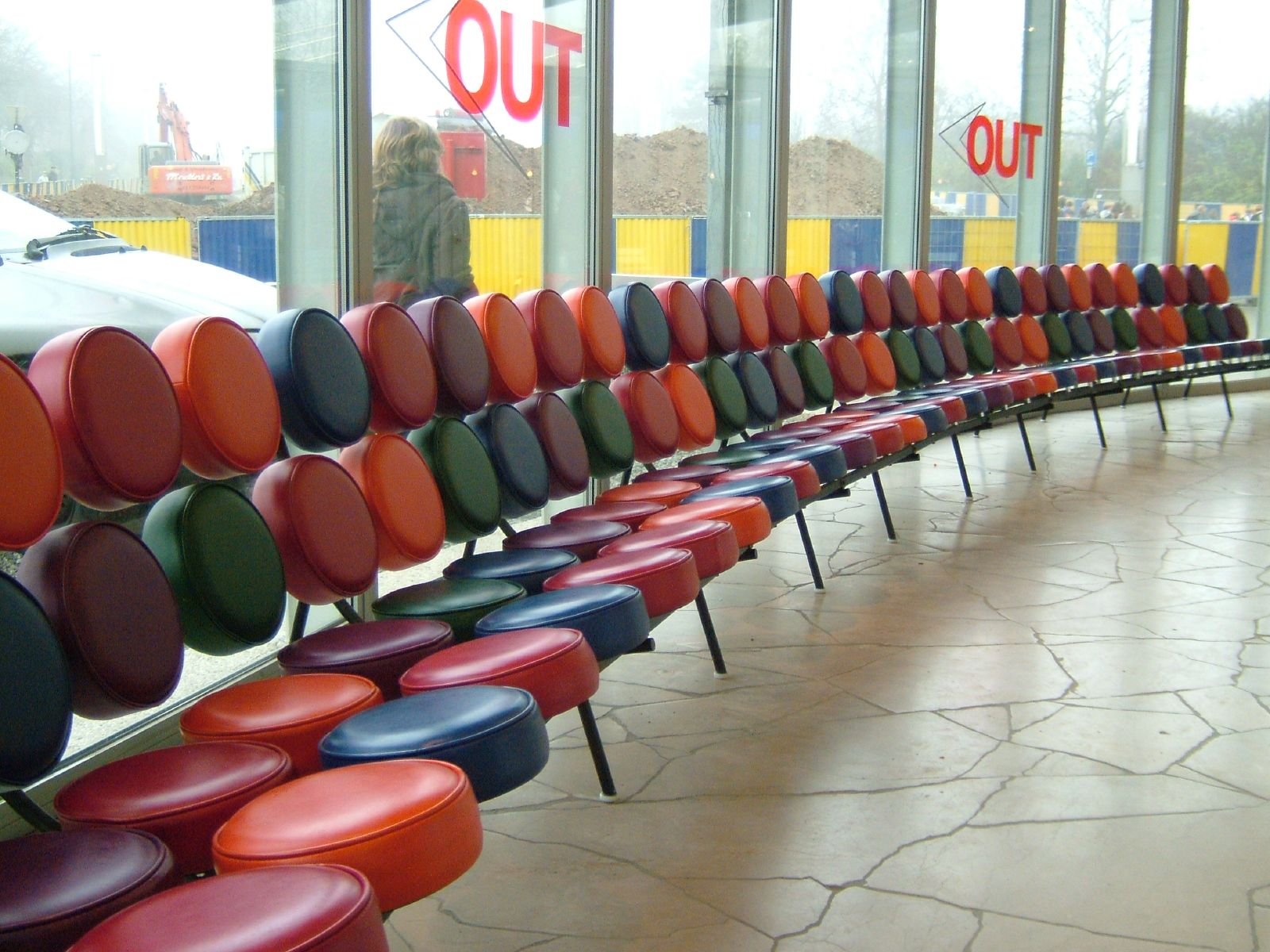
- A row of marshmallow sofas
- Designer: Irving Harper
- Materials: Foam, metal
- Sold by: Herman Miller

Marshmallow Love Seat #5670, commonly known as the Marshmallow sofa, is a modernist sofa produced by the American furniture company Herman Miller, that was initially manufactured between 1956 and 1961. It is considered the most iconic of all modernist sofas. The sofa was designed by Irving Harper of George Nelson Associates. It was produced in two lengths from 1956 to 1961. It consists of a metal frame with round discs of covered foam, or "marshmallows", spread across the seat and back in a lattice arrangement.

The sofa, in the smaller of the two sizes, was reissued in the 1980s as part of the "Herman Miller Classics" line and continues in production today.

== History ==
The design was created in 1954 when a salesman for a Long Island plastics company presented to George Nelson's New York City studio an example of the company's ability to create round, 12-inch foam discs that became "self-skinned". The limited manufacturing costs made the item inviting, and designer Irving Harper was asked to design a piece of furniture around the discs. Over a weekend, Harper designed a sofa, incorporating 18 discs arranged over a metal frame. The invention did not live up to its promise, as covering the individual seat pads proved costly and time-consuming, turning the intended budget piece into a luxury product. Nevertheless, Herman Miller went ahead with production and introduced it in 1956.

Herman Miller initially issued the Marshmallow sofa in 1956. The sofa was dropped in 1961. Despite its popularity, only 186 Marshmallow sofas were made.

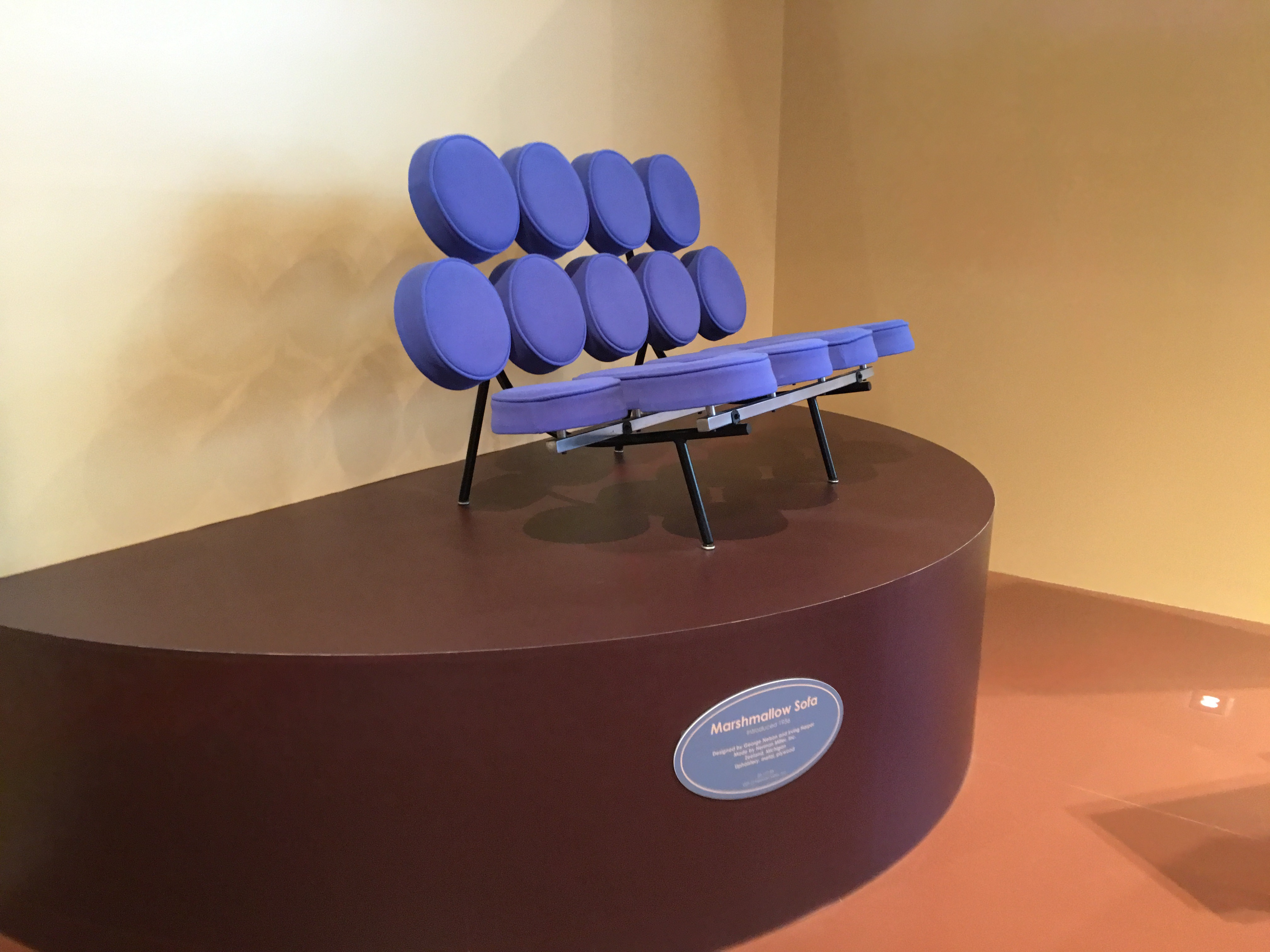
Marshmallow sofa at the Henry Ford Museum

== Design ==
Herman Miller officially listed the sofa as the Marshmallow love seat #5670. Circular "marshmallow" cushions made of foam and covered in fabric, vinyl, or leather were placed on a metal frame to form the sofa.

The marshmallow sofa was produced in two lengths. The 52" version incorporates 18 cushions in a pattern of 4-5-5-4. The 103" length uses 38 cushions in a 9-10-10-9 pattern.

== Design attribution ==
The Marshmallow sofa was designed in 1954 by Irving Harper. For decades, the design of the Marshmallow sofa was attributed to George Nelson, as was the practice for designs coming out of George Nelson Associates, Inc. However, it was later revealed that many of the firm's designs were those of other designers working for the firm. John Pile, a designer who worked for George Nelson Associates, Inc. in the 1950s, explained, "George's attitude was that it was okay for individual designers to be given credit in trade publications, but for the consumer world, the credit should always be to the firm, not the individual. He didn't always follow through on that policy though."

== As collector's items ==
Examples of the 186 originally-produced sofas routinely sell for $15,000 or more. The scarce 103" length is rarely offered for sale. One example, covered in white fabric and signed by Irving Harper, was sold by Sotheby's in 2000 for $37,500.

== In popular culture ==
On the cover of the second volume of Spy × Family, Anya Forger is shown sitting on a Marshmallow sofa.
