= Black Sun (sculpture) =

Sculpture by Isamu Noguchi in Seattle, Washington, U.S.

- Artist: Isamu Noguchi
- Year: 1969
- Type: Sculpture
- Medium: Granite
- Dimensions: 2.7 m diameter (9 ft)
- Location: Seattle; 47.629943°N 122.315195°W
- Owner: City of Seattle

Black Sun is a 1969 sculpture by Isamu Noguchi located in Seattle, Washington's Volunteer Park. The statue is situated on the eastern edge of the park's man-made reservoir, across from the Seattle Asian Art Museum. The view from the sculpture includes the Space Needle, Olympic Mountains, and Elliott Bay.

Many mistakenly believe Soundgarden's hit single "Black Hole Sun" was inspired by Noguchi's sculpture, as the band took their name from another outdoor public art work in Seattle, A Sound Garden, and the resemblance of the song's title to Noguchi's work. However, singer-songwriter Chris Cornell attributes the song's inspiration to a misheard news broadcast.

== See also ==
- Black Sun (alchemy)
