= Lucia DeRespinis =

American industrial designer (born 1927)

- Born: 1927 (age 98–99); Cleveland, Ohio, U.S.
- Known for: Industrial design

Lucia DeRespinis (born 1927) is an American industrial designer known for her work with George Nelson and her creation of the pink and orange Dunkin' Donuts logo.

DeRespinis was born in Cleveland, Ohio in 1927. She attended St. Lawrence University and then Pratt Institute, graduating in 1952. She worked at the design studio George Nelson & Associates from 1954 through 1963. Her creations there include the Beehive Hanging Lamp. In 1959 she worked on the design of the American display for the American National Exhibition in Moscow.

She taught design at Pratt from 1975 until 2020, when she retired.

DeRespinis was the recipient of the 2008 Rowena Reed Kostellow Award. She is a Fellow of the Industrial Designers Society of America. Her work is in the Museum of Fine Arts, Houston and the Vitra Design Museum Collection.
