= Irving Harper =

American industrial designer

- Born: July 14, 1916; New York City, U.S.
- Died: August 4, 2015 (aged 99); Rye, New York, U.S.
- Occupation(s): Industrial designer, entrepreneur, author
- Years active: 1936-2001

Irving Harper (July 14, 1916 – August 4, 2015) was an American industrial designer. While working for George Nelson Associates, Inc. on designs for Herman Miller furniture, Harper became one of the most prolific designers of the modernist style. Among his important designs is the Herman Miller company logo, and the company's Marshmallow sofa.

== Early years ==
Harper was born in New York City in 1916. After attending Cooper Union and Brooklyn College, Irving Harper worked as a draftsman for the Gilbert Rohde's office in the 1930s. Leaving Rohde's, he worked as an interior designer for noted industrial designer Raymond Loewy at the Raymond Loewy Associates office, designing interiors in the company's department store division. Born Irving Hoffzimer to David and Rebecca Hoffzimer. Oldest of three children He had two sisters, Phyliss and Sophie.

== George Nelson Associates, Inc. ==
In the 1940s Harper met George Nelson. In 1947 he was offered a job as an interior designer by Nelson and joined George Nelson Associates, Inc. In 1947 Harper designed the logo for Herman Miller, Inc. Never trained as a graphic artist, Harper based the logo around a large letter "M", for Miller.

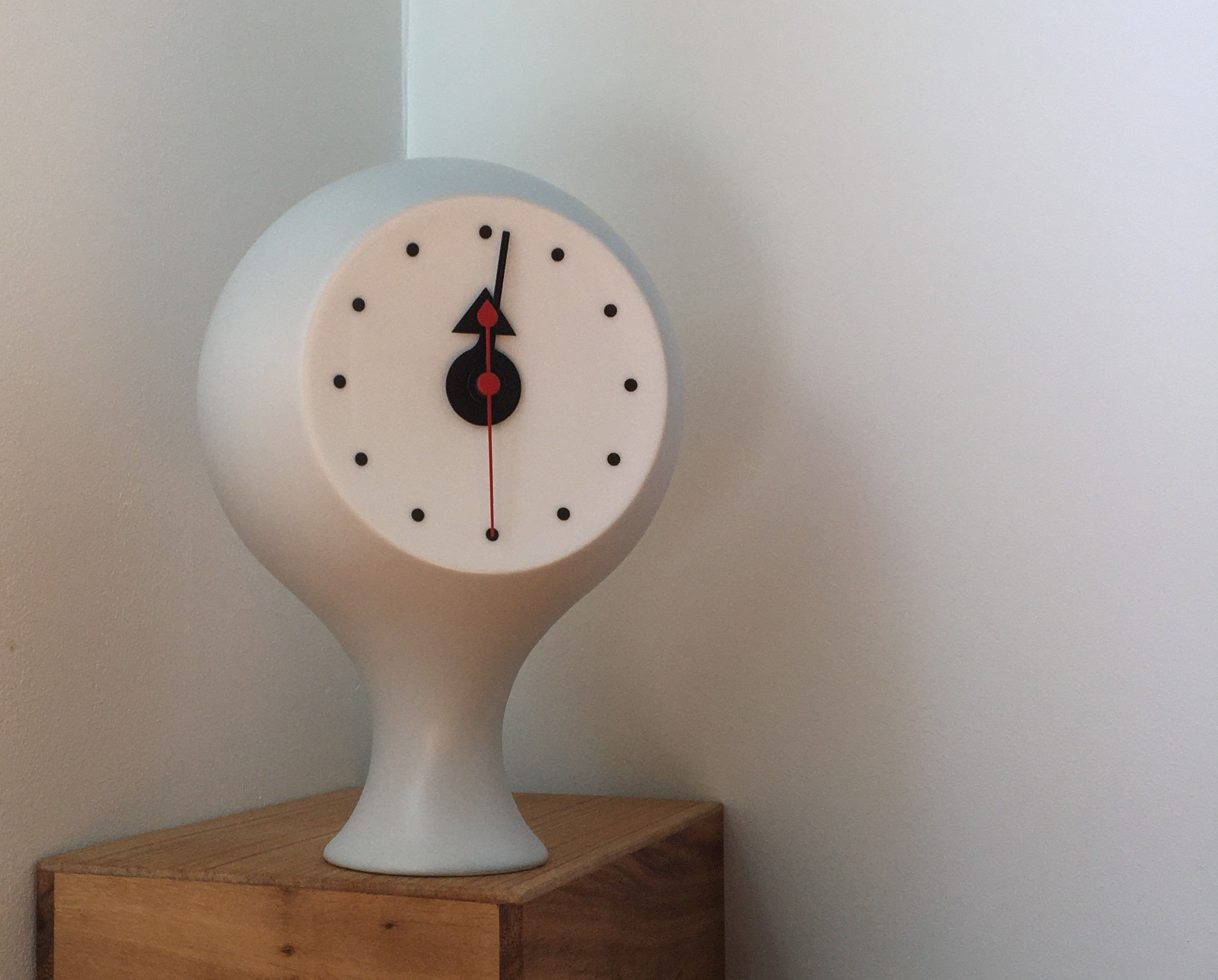
Ceramic clock designed by Harper for George Nelson, reissued by Vitra

Later Nelson got the Howard Miller Clock Co. account, and Harper was given the responsibility of handling it. Harper decided to create clocks that were a piece of sculpture. Many of Harper's wall and desk clocks are now being manufactured by Vitra.

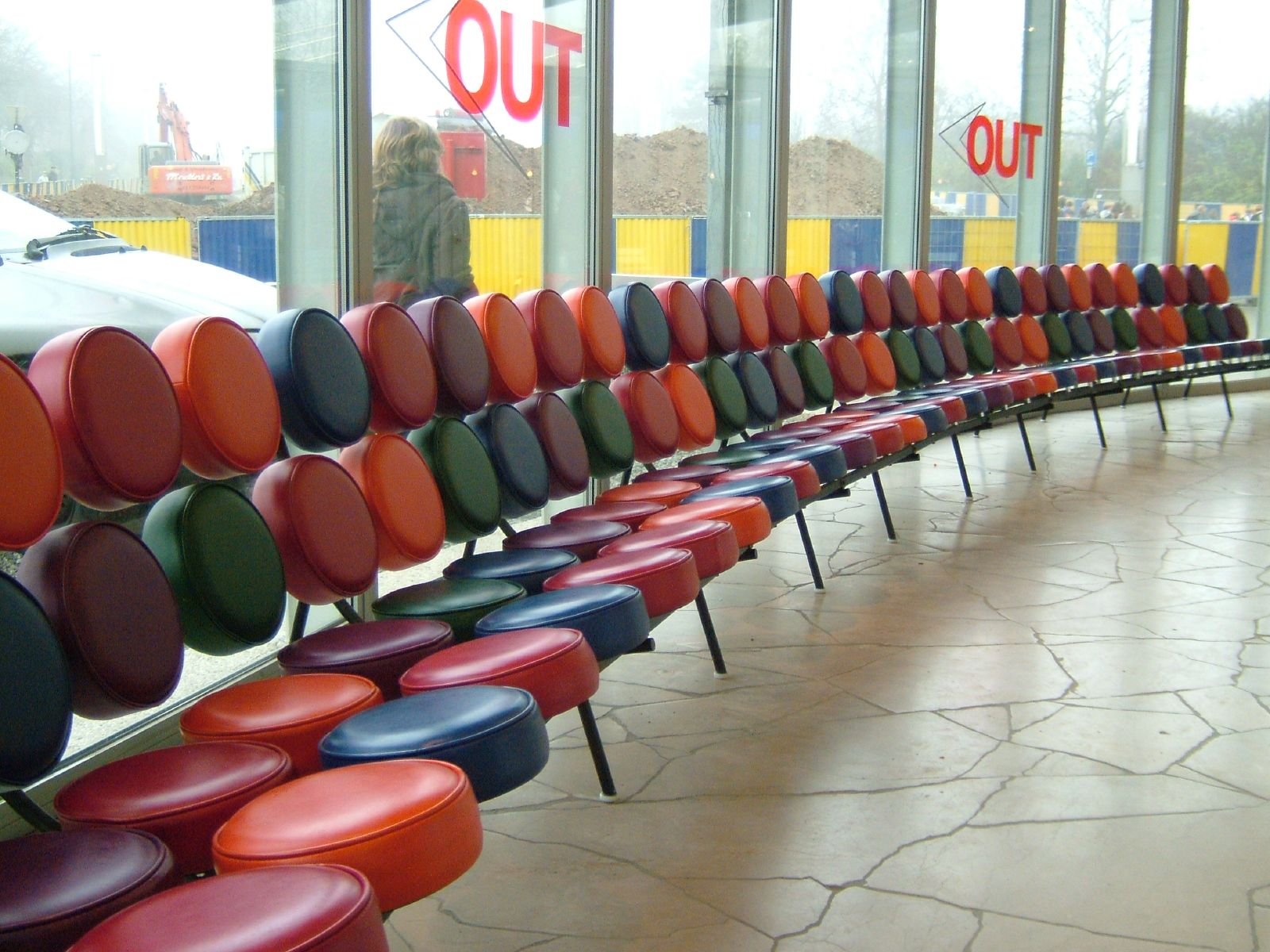
A row of marshmallow sofas

In 1954, Harper was introduced to a salesman from a Long Island plastics company. The salesman offered a product that created 12 inch diameter self-skinning discs. George Nelson embraced the idea as a way to manufacture low-cost furniture. Over a weekend Harper designed a sofa incorporating 18 of the discs in a whimsical pattern. The salesman's product didn't live up to expectations, but Harper's design was put into production by Herman Miller as the Marshmallow sofa.

Harper worked for George Nelson Associates, Inc. for 17 years. During his time with the firm most of Harper's designs were attributed to George Nelson, as was the company's practice. John Pile, a designer for the firm in the 1950s, explains, "George's attitude was that it was okay for individual designers to be given credit in trade publications, but for the consumer world, the credit should always be to the firm, not the individual. He didn't always follow through on that policy though."

== After George Nelson ==
Harper left George Nelson Associates, Inc. in 1963. Together with Phillip George they started Harper+George, a design company. The firm created iconic designs for Penn Central in 1965, Braniff International Airways from 1967 until 1982, Jack Lenor Larsen, and Hallmark Cards, among others.

Harper retired from Harper+George in 1983, and resided in Rye, New York, in a 19th-century farmhouse filled with modernist furnishings, and over 300 of his paper sculptures.

In early 2001 Harper teamed with textile designer Michael Maharam to re-introduce Harper's original 1950s era Herman Miller textile prints as part of Maharam's "Textiles of the 20th Century" line. Harper's print "Pavement fabric" was the first to be re-introduced in 2001, followed by "China Shop" in the fall of that year.

== Death ==
Harper died on August 4, 2015, aged 99, in Rye, New York.
