= Max De Pree =

American businessman and writer (1924–2017)

- Born: 1924; Zeeland, Michigan, U.S.
- Died: August 8, 2017; Holland, Michigan, U.S.
- Alma mater: Hope College
- Occupations: Businessman, writer
- Writing career
- Notable work: Leadership Is an Art

Max De Pree (October 28, 1924 – August 8, 2017) was an American businessman and writer. A son of D. J. De Pree, founder of Herman Miller office furniture company, he and his brother Hugh De Pree assumed leadership of the company in the early 1960s, with Hugh becoming CEO and president in 1962. Max succeeded his brother Hugh as CEO in 1980 and served in that capacity till 1987; he was a member of the company's Board of Directors until 1995. His book Leadership is an Art has sold more than 800,000 copies. In 1992, De Pree was inducted into the Junior Achievement's U.S. Business Hall of Fame. He served on the board of Fuller Theological Seminary for forty years and was involved with the Max De Pree Center for Leadership at Fuller Theological Seminary (established in 1996 as the De Pree Center) since its establishment. He died at his home in Holland, Michigan in 2017.

== Studies ==
He had planned to become a doctor. He studied at Wheaton College but was interrupted by World War II. He served in the Army Medical Corps in the European Theatre of Operations. Still in the Army, he studied at the University of Pittsburgh, Haverford College, and the University of Paris. After his military service he attended Hope College, graduating with a Bachelor of Arts degree in 1948.

== Management style ==
He fostered the idea of an inclusive corporation, one in which all voices are heard. He was known for his efforts to combine a caring organization with business success. As opposed to the idea of a golden parachute, he proposed the idea of a silver parachute, in which terminated employees who had worked more than 2 years for a company would receive benefits according to the number of years served.

He encouraged open communication in the organization. He was often heard to say "Err on the side of over-communication."

== Works ==
- Leadership is an Art; Michigan State University Press (1987); ISBN 0-385-51246-5
- Leadership Jazz; Dell Publishing (1993); ISBN 0-440-50518-6
- Dear Zoe; Harper Collins (1996); ISBN 0-8028-4592-4
- Called to Serve: Creating and Nurturing the Effective Volunteer Board; Wm. B. Eerdmans Publishing Company (2001); ISBN 0-8028-4922-9
- Leading Without Power: Finding Hope in Serving Community; John Wiley & Sons Canada, Ltd. (2003); ISBN 0-7879-6743-2
