= Noguchi table =

Modernist table design

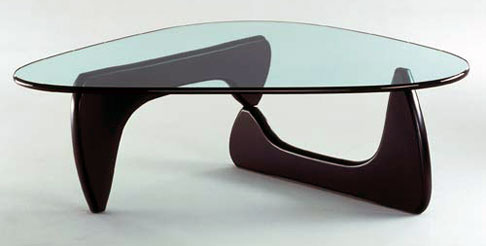
- Noguchi coffee table exhibited at the Musée d'Orsay in 1959
- Designer: Isamu Noguchi
- Date: 1947
- Materials: Hardwood and glass
- Style / tradition: Modernist furniture design
- Sold by: Herman Miller (United States)
- Height: 40 cm (16 in)
- Width: 91 cm (36 in)
- Depth: 127 cm (50 in)

The Noguchi table is a piece of modernist furniture first produced in the mid-20th century. Introduced by Herman Miller in 1947, it was designed in the United States by Japanese American artist and industrial designer Isamu Noguchi. The Noguchi table comprises a wooden base composed of two identical curved wood pieces, and a heavy plate-glass top.

== Construction ==
The base was originally produced in walnut, birch, and cherry. It was later offered in ebonized walnut. Cherry bases were made only during the first year the table was on the market, and have been highly sought since. Birch bases were discontinued after 1954. As of 2016, the table is available in an ebonized finish, walnut, white ash, and natural cherry.

The top was initially issued in 7/8-inch (22 mm) heavy plate glass. In 1965, the thickness of the top was reduced to 3/4 inch (19 mm), and its base height was raised, increasing the table's total height from 15 inches (380 mm) to 15.75 inches (400 mm).

Since the late 1980s, indexing pins have been installed on the pivot rod with matching slots milled into the legs to ensure that the two leg elements are set up at a 52-degree angle for maximum aesthetic appeal and optimal stability.
