= Isamu Noguchi =

American artist and landscape architect (1904–1988)

- 野口 勇
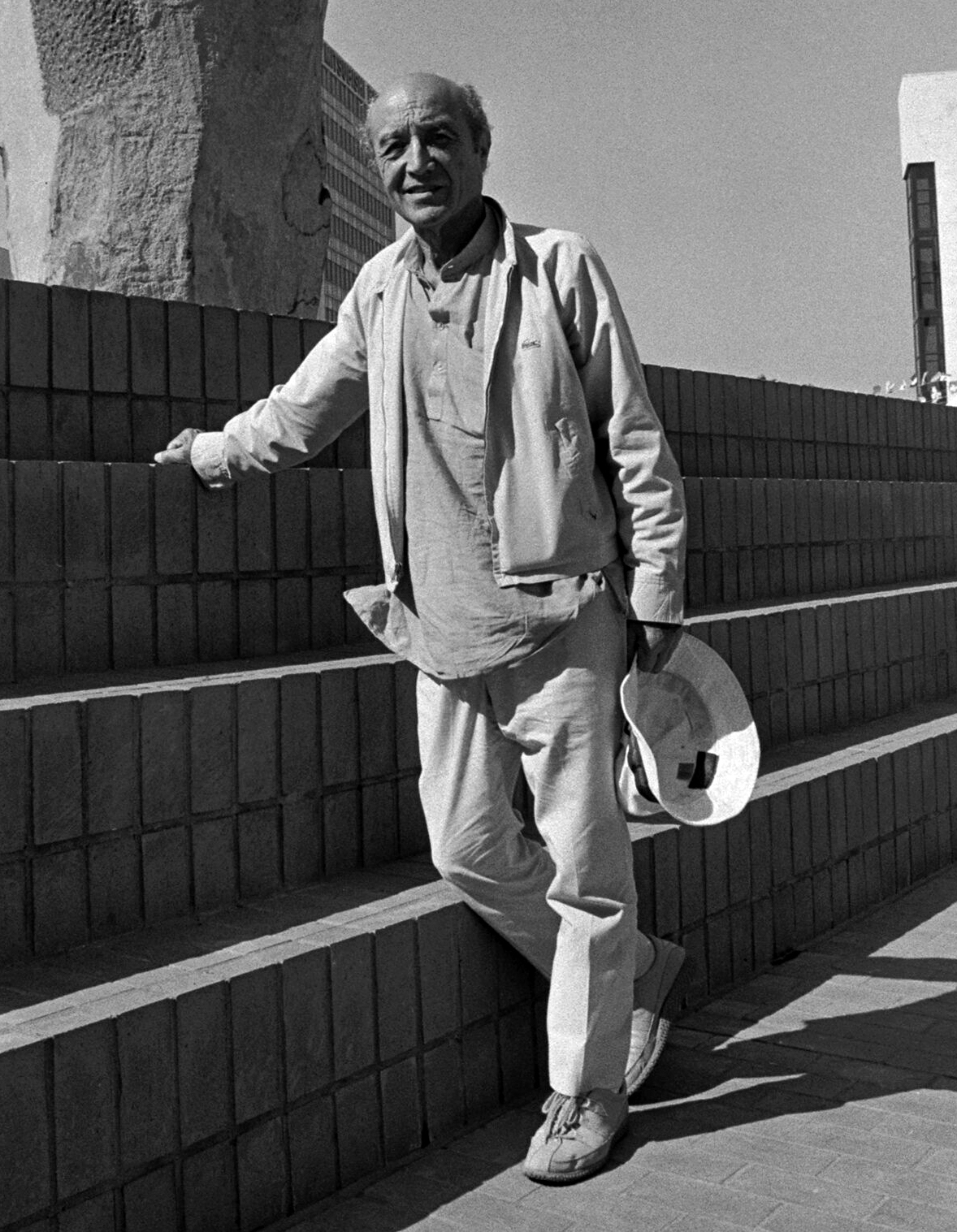
- Noguchi in 1983
- Born: November 17, 1904; Los Angeles, California, US
- Died: December 30, 1988 (aged 84); New York City, US
- Education: Columbia University
- Known for: Sculpture landscape architecture furniture design
- Notable work: Red Cube (New York City); Black Sun (Seattle); Sky Gate (Honolulu); Akari light sculptures; Herman Miller lounge table; Sapporo Moerenuma Park
- Movement: Biomorphism
- Spouse: Yoshiko Yamaguchi (m. 1951; div. 1957)
- Awards: Logan Medal of the arts (Art Institute of Chicago)1963; Gold Medal, Architectural League of New York1965; Brandeis Creative Arts Award, 1966; Gold Medal (American Academy of Arts and Letters), 1977; Order of the Sacred Treasure; National Medal of Arts (1987)

Isamu Noguchi (野口 勇, Noguchi Isamu; Japanese: [noꜜgɯtɕi isamɯ], English: /nəˈɡuːtʃi/; November 17, 1904 – December 30, 1988) was an American artist, furniture designer and landscape architect whose career spanned six decades from the 1920s. Known for his sculpture and public artworks, Noguchi also designed stage sets for various Martha Graham productions, Akari light sculptures, and furniture pieces, many of which are still manufactured and sold. His work is displayed at the Isamu Noguchi Foundation and Garden Museum in New York City as well as many other museums.

== Early life (1904–1922) ==
Isamu Noguchi was born in Los Angeles, the son of Yone Noguchi, a Japanese poet who was acclaimed in the United States, and Léonie Gilmour, an American writer who edited much of Noguchi's work.

Yone had ended his relationship with Gilmour earlier that year and planned to marry The Washington Post reporter Ethel Armes. After proposing to Armes, Yone left for Japan in late August, settling in Tokyo and awaiting her arrival; their engagement fell through months later when Armes learned of Léonie and her newborn son.

In 1906, Yone invited Léonie to come to Tokyo with their son. She at first refused, but growing anti-Japanese sentiment following the Russo-Japanese War eventually convinced her to take up Yone's offer. The two departed from San Francisco in March 1907, arriving in Yokohama to meet Yone. Upon arrival, their son was finally given the name Isamu (勇, "courage"). However, Yone had married a Japanese woman by the time they arrived, and was mostly absent from his son's childhood. After again separating from Yone, Léonie and Isamu moved several times throughout Japan.

In 1912, while the two were living in Chigasaki, Isamu's half-sister, pioneer of the American Modern Dance movement, Ailes Gilmour, was born to Léonie and an unknown Japanese father. Here, Léonie had a house built for the three of them, a project that she had the 8-year-old Isamu "oversee". Nurturing her son's artistic ability, she put him in charge of their garden and apprenticed him to a local carpenter. However, they moved once again in December 1917 to an English-speaking community in Yokohama.

In 1918, Noguchi was sent back to the U.S. for schooling in Rolling Prairie, Indiana. After graduation, he left with Dr. Edward Rumely to LaPorte, where he found boarding with a Swedenborgian pastor, Samuel Mack. Noguchi began attending La Porte High School, graduating in 1922. During this period of his life, he was known by the name "Sam Gilmour".

== Early artistic career (1922–1927) ==
After high school, Noguchi explained his desire to become an artist to Rumely; though Rumely preferred that Noguchi become a doctor, he acknowledged Noguchi's request and sent him to Connecticut to work as an apprentice to his friend Gutzon Borglum. Best known as the creator of Mount Rushmore National Memorial, Borglum was at the time working on the group called Wars of America for the city of Newark, New Jersey, a work of art that includes forty-two figures and two equestrian sculptures. As one of Borglum's apprentices, Noguchi received little training as a sculptor; his tasks included arranging the horses and modeling for the monument as General Sherman. He did, however, pick up some skills in casting from Borglum's Italian assistants, later fashioning a bust of Abraham Lincoln. At summer's end, Borglum told Noguchi that he would never become a sculptor, prompting him to reconsider Rumely's prior suggestion.

He then traveled to New York City, reuniting with the Rumely family at their new residence, and with Dr. Rumely's financial aid enrolled in February 1922 as a premedical student at Columbia University. Soon after, he met the bacteriologist Hideyo Noguchi, who urged him to reconsider art, as well as the Japanese dancer Michio Itō, whose celebrity status later helped Noguchi find acquaintances in the art world. Another influence was his mother, who in 1923 moved from Japan to California, then later to New York.

In 1924, while still enrolled at Columbia, Noguchi followed his mother's advice to take night classes at the Leonardo da Vinci Art School. The school's head, Onorio Ruotolo, was immediately impressed by Noguchi's work. Only three months later, Noguchi held his first exhibit, a selection of plaster and terracotta works. He soon dropped out of Columbia University to pursue sculpture full-time, changing his name from Gilmour (the surname he had used for years) to Noguchi.

After moving into his own studio, Noguchi found work through commissions for portrait busts, and won the Logan Medal of the Arts. During this time, he frequented avant garde shows at the galleries of such modernists as Alfred Stieglitz and J. B. Neuman, and took a particular interest in a show of the works of Romanian-born sculptor Constantin Brâncuși.

In late 1926, Noguchi applied for a Guggenheim Fellowship. In his letter of application, he proposed to study stone and wood cutting and to gain "a better understanding of the human figure" in Paris for a year, then spend another year traveling through Asia, exhibit his work, and return to New York. He was awarded the grant despite being three years short of the age requirement.

== Early travels (1927–1937) ==
Noguchi arrived in Paris in April 1927 and soon afterward met the American author Robert McAlmon, who brought him to Constantin Brâncuși's studio for an introduction. Despite a language barrier between the two artists (Noguchi barely spoke French, and Brâncuși did not speak English), Noguchi was taken in as Brâncuși's assistant for the next seven months. During this time, Noguchi gained his footing in stone sculpture, a medium with which he was unacquainted, though he would later admit that one of Brâncuși's greatest teachings was to appreciate "the value of the moment". Meanwhile, Noguchi found himself in good company in France, with letters of introduction from Michio Itō helping him to meet such artists as Jules Pascin and Alexander Calder, who lived in the studio of Arno Breker. They became friends and Breker did a bronze bust of Noguchi.

Noguchi only produced one sculpture – his marble Sphere Section – in his first year, but during his second year he stayed in Paris and continued his training in stoneworking with the Italian sculptor Mateo Hernandes, producing over twenty more abstractions of wood, stone and sheet metal. Noguchi's next major destination was India, from which he would travel east; he arrived in London to read up on Oriental sculpture, but was denied the extension to the Guggenheim Fellowship he needed.

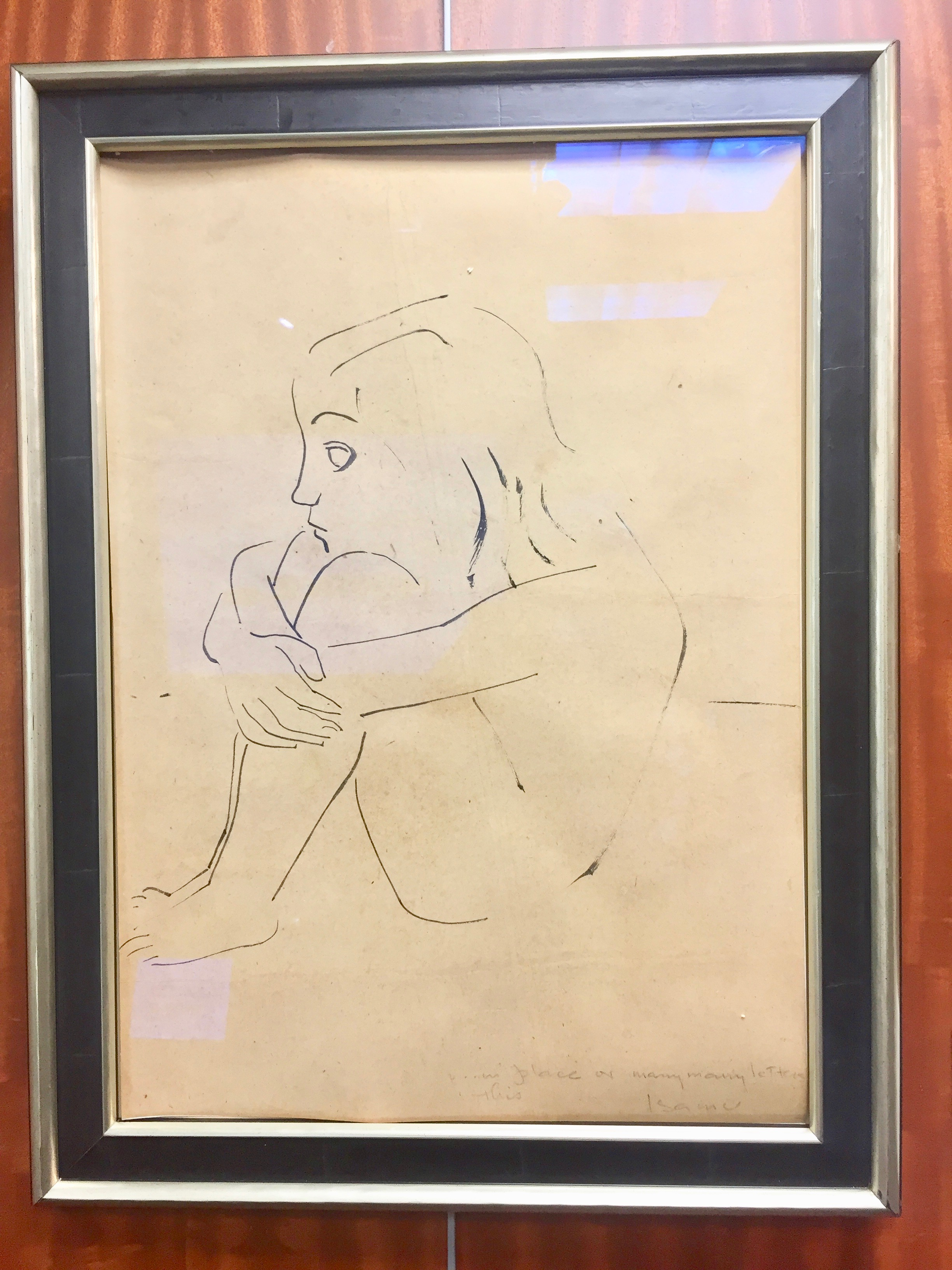
Untitled by Isamu Noguchi.

In February 1929, he left for New York City. Brâncuși had recommended that Noguchi visit Romany Marie's café in Greenwich Village. Noguchi did so and there met Buckminster Fuller, with whom he collaborated on several projects, including the modeling of Fuller's Dymaxion car.

Upon his return, Noguchi's abstract sculptures made in Paris were exhibited in his first one-man show at the Eugene Schoen Gallery. After none of his works sold, Noguchi altogether abandoned abstract art for portrait busts in order to support himself. He soon found himself accepting commissions from wealthy and celebrity clients. A 1930 exhibit of several busts, including those of Martha Graham and Buckminster Fuller, garnered positive reviews, and after less than a year of portrait sculpture, Noguchi had earned enough money to continue his trip to Asia.

Noguchi left for Paris in April 1930, and two months later received his visa to ride the Trans-Siberian Railway. He opted to visit Japan first rather than India, but after learning that his father Yone did not want his son to visit using his surname, a shaken Noguchi instead departed for Beijing. In China, he studied brush painting with Qi Baishi, staying for six months before finally sailing for Japan. Even before his arrival in Kobe, Japanese newspapers had picked up on Noguchi's supposed reunion with his father; though he denied that this was the reason for his visit, the two did meet in Tokyo. He later arrived in Kyoto to study pottery with Uno Jinmatsu. Here he took note of local Zen gardens and haniwa, clay funerary figures of the Kofun period which inspired his terracotta The Queen.

Noguchi returned to New York amidst the Great Depression, finding few clients for his portrait busts. However, he hoped to sell his newly produced sculptures and brush paintings from Asia. Though very few sold, Noguchi regarded this one-man exhibition (which began in February 1932 and toured Chicago, the west coast, and Honolulu) as his "most successful". Additionally, his next attempt to break into abstract art, a large streamlined figure of dancer Ruth Page entitled Miss Expanding Universe, was poorly received. In January 1933 he worked in Chicago with Santiago Martínez Delgado on a mural for Chicago's Century of Progress Exposition, then again found a business for his portrait busts. He moved to London in June hoping to find more work, but returned in December just before his mother Leonie's death.

Beginning in February 1934, Noguchi began submitting his first designs for public spaces and monuments to the Public Works of Art Program. One such design, a monument to Benjamin Franklin, remained unrealized for decades. Another design, a gigantic pyramidal earthwork entitled Monument to the American Plow, was similarly rejected, and his "sculptural landscape" of a playground, Play Mountain, was personally rejected by Parks Commissioner Robert Moses. He was eventually dropped from the program, and again supported himself by sculpting portrait busts. In early 1935, after another solo exhibition, the New York Sun's Henry McBride labeled Noguchi's Death, depicting a lynched African-American, as "a little Japanese mistake". That same year he produced the set for Frontier, the first of many set designs for Martha Graham.

After the Federal Art Project started up, Noguchi again put forth designs, one of which was another earthwork chosen for the New York City airport entitled Relief Seen from the Sky; following further rejection, Noguchi left for Hollywood, where he again worked as a portrait sculptor to earn money for a sojourn in Mexico. Here, Noguchi was chosen to design his first public work, a relief mural for the Abelardo Rodriguez market in Mexico City. The 20-meter-long History as Seen from Mexico in 1936 was hugely political and socially conscious, featuring such modern symbols as the Nazi swastika, a hammer and sickle, and the equation E = mc². Noguchi also met Frida Kahlo during this time and had a brief but passionate affair with her; they remained friends until her death.

== Further career in the United States (1937–1948) ==
Noguchi returned to New York in 1937. He designed the Zenith Radio Nurse, the iconic original baby monitor now held in many museum collections. The Radio Nurse was Noguchi's first major design commission and he called it "my only strictly industrial design".

He again began to turn out portrait busts, and after various proposals was selected for two sculptures. The first of these, a fountain built of automobile parts for the Ford Motor Company's exhibit at the 1939 New York World's Fair, was thought of poorly by critics and Noguchi alike but nevertheless introduced him to fountain-construction and magnesite. Conversely, his second sculpture, a nine-ton stainless steel bas-relief entitled News, was unveiled over the entrance to the Associated Press building at the Rockefeller Center in April 1940 to much praise. Following further rejections of his playground designs, Noguchi left on a cross-country road trip with Arshile Gorky and Gorky's fiancée in July 1941, eventually separating from them to go to Hollywood.

Following the attack on Pearl Harbor, anti-Japanese sentiment was energized in the United States, and in response Noguchi formed "Nisei Writers and Artists for Democracy". Noguchi and other group leaders wrote to influential officials, including the congressional committee headed by Representative John H. Tolan, hoping to halt the internment of Japanese Americans; Noguchi later attended the hearings but had little effect on their outcome. He later helped organize a documentary of the internment, but left California before its release; as a legal resident of New York, he was allowed to return home. He hoped to prove Japanese-American loyalty by somehow contributing to the war effort, but when other governmental departments turned him down, Noguchi met with John Collier, head of the Office of Indian Affairs, who persuaded him to travel to the internment camp located on an Indian reservation in Poston, Arizona, to promote arts and crafts and community.

Noguchi arrived at the Poston camp in May 1942, becoming its only voluntary internee. Noguchi first worked in a carpentry shop, but his hope was to design parks and recreational areas within the camp. Although he created several plans at Poston, among them designs for baseball fields, swimming pools, and a cemetery, he found that the War Relocation Authority had no intention of implementing them. To the WRA camp administrators he was a troublesome interloper from the Bureau of Indian Affairs, and to the internees he was an agent of the camp administration. Many did not trust him and saw him as a spy. He had found nothing in common with the Nisei, who regarded him as a strange outsider.

In June, Noguchi applied for release, but intelligence officers labeled him as a "suspicious person" due to his involvement in "Nisei Writers and Artists for Democracy". He was finally granted a month-long furlough on November 12, but never returned; though he was granted a permanent leave afterward, he soon afterward received a deportation order. The Federal Bureau of Investigation, accusing him of espionage, launched into a full investigation of Noguchi which ended only through the American Civil Liberties Union's intervention. Noguchi would later retell his wartime experiences in the British World War II television documentary series The World at War.

Upon his return to New York, Noguchi took a new studio in Greenwich Village. Throughout the 1940s, Noguchi's sculpture drew from the ongoing surrealist movement; these works include not only various mixed-media constructions and landscape reliefs, but lunars – self-illuminating reliefs – and a series of biomorphic sculptures made of interlocking slabs. The most famous of these assembled-slab works, Kouros, was first shown in a September 1946 exhibition, helping to cement his place in the New York art scene.

In 1947 he began a working relationship with Herman Miller of Zeeland, Michigan. This relationship was to prove very fruitful, resulting in several designs that have become symbols of the modernist style, including the iconic Noguchi table, which remains in production today. Noguchi also developed a relationship with Knoll, designing furniture and lamps. During this period he continued his involvement with theater, designing sets for Martha Graham's Appalachian Spring and John Cage and Merce Cunningham's production of The Seasons. Near the end of his time in New York, he also found more work designing public spaces, including a commission for the ceilings of the Time-Life headquarters.

In March 1949, Noguchi had his first one-person show in New York since 1935 at the Charles Egan Gallery. In September 2003, The Pace Gallery held an exhibition of Noguchi's work at their 57th Street gallery. The exhibition, entitled 33 MacDougal Alley: The Interlocking Sculpture of Isamu Noguchi, featured eleven of the artist’s interlocking sculptures. This was the first exhibition to illustrate the historical significance of the relationship between MacDougal Alley and Isamu Noguchi’s sculptural work.

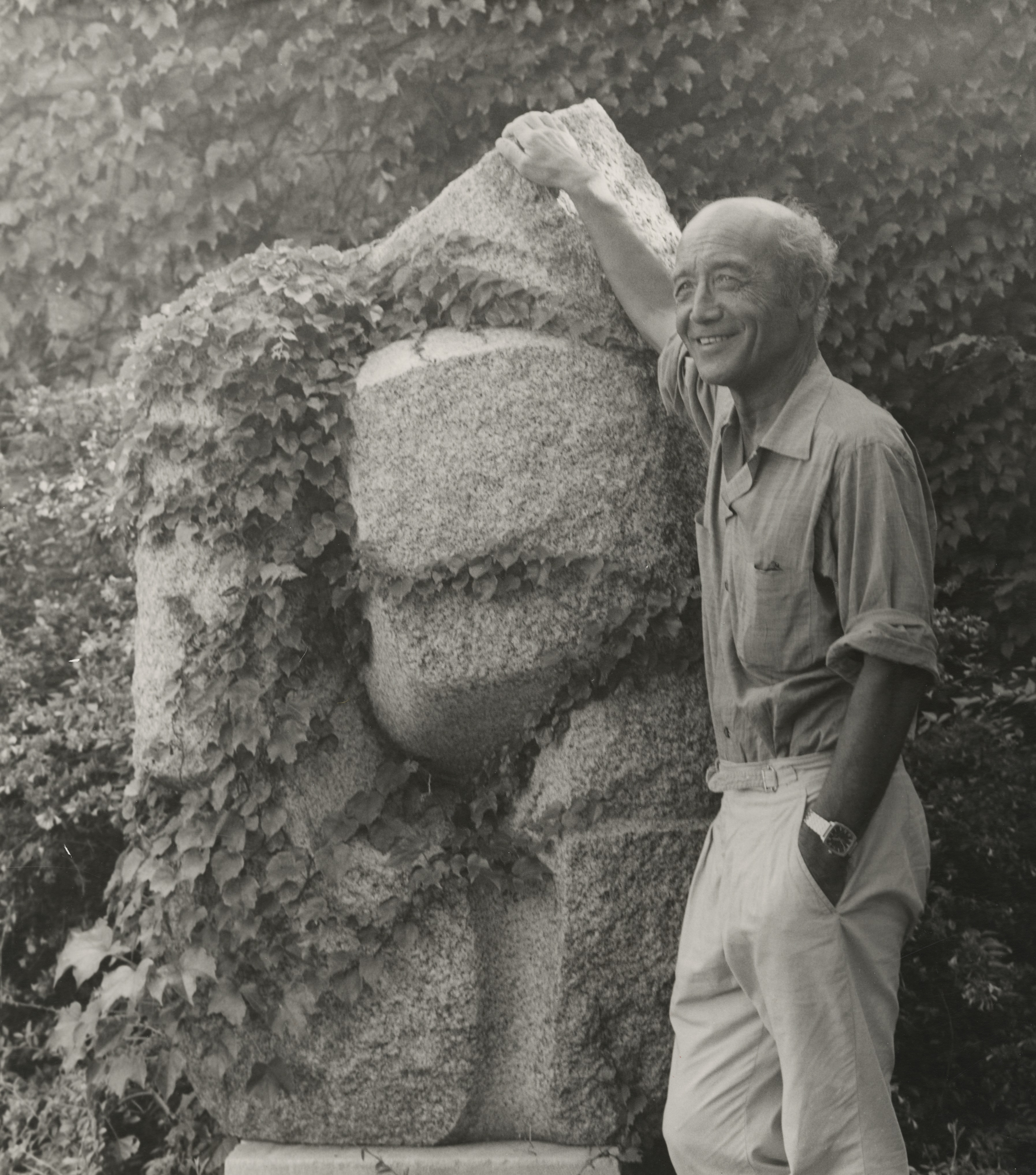
Isamu Noguchi at the Noguchi Garden Museum, c.1985, ©David Finn Archive, Department of Image Collections, National Gallery of Art Library, Washington, DC

== Bollingen Fellowship and life in Japan (1948–1952) ==
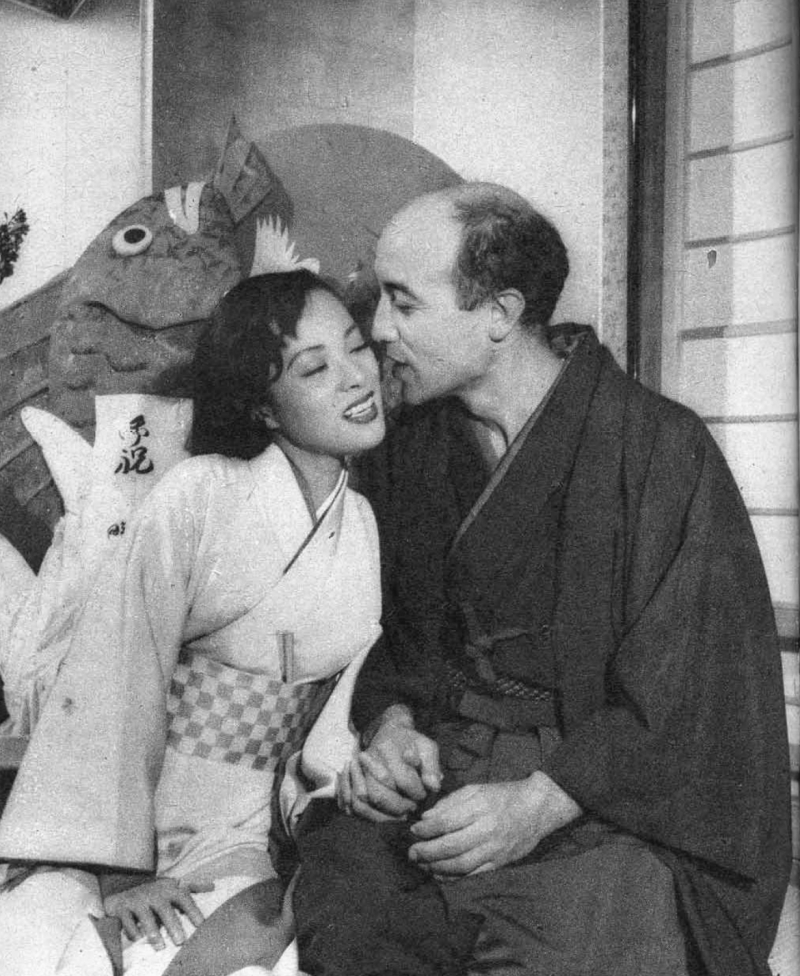
Noguchi and his newly-married wife Yoshiko Yamaguchi in Tokyo, 1951

Following the suicide of his artist friend Arshile Gorky in 1948, and a failed romantic relationship with Nayantara Pandit (the niece of Indian nationalist Jawaharlal Nehru), Noguchi applied for a Bollingen Fellowship to travel the world, proposing to study public space as research for a book about the "environment of leisure". It wasn't until 15 years after his death that this project came to fruition as an international traveling exhibition and a deluxe limited-edition publication, organized by Noguchi's long-time assistant and curator at the Noguchi Museum, Bonnie Rychlak.

During his postwar stay in Japan, Noguchi was photographed in Nagoya by Kansuke Yamamoto, with the portrait published in the Shintōkai Shimbun on 15 July 1950.

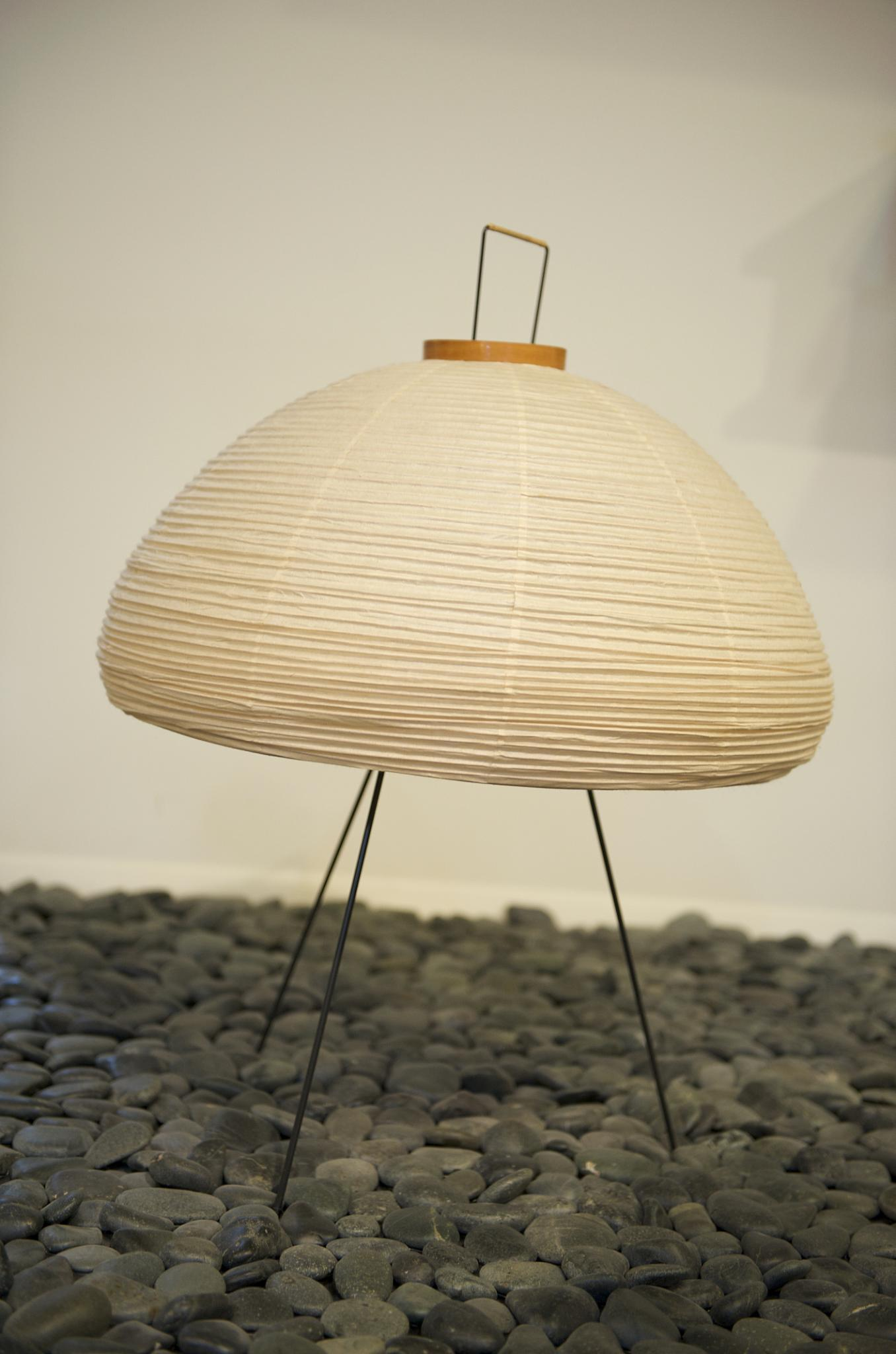
Akari light sculpture (1960s)

In 1951 Noguchi visited Gifu, a town that specialized in making traditional paper lanterns. The mayor of Gifu approached Noguchi and asked him to help modernize the lanterns, which were growing obsolete with the rise of electricity. Noguchi did so by redesigning the lamps to use light bulbs rather than candles, and using wire to make the shapes more sculptural.

Noguchi viewed his new lanterns as works of art rather than simple light sources. He called them "Akari light sculptures" and compared the light they emit to "the sun filtered through the paper of shoji". In reference to Jun'ichirō Tanizaki's seminal philosophical essay on Japanese aesthetics In Praise of Shadows, Noguchi mused, "All that you require to start a home are a room, a tatami, and Akari."

== Later years (1952–1988) ==
In his later years Noguchi gained in prominence and acclaim, installing his large-scale works in many of the world's major cities.

He was married to the ethnic-Japanese icon of Chinese song and cinema Yoshiko Yamaguchi, between 1952 and 1957.

From 1959 to 1988, Noguchi was in a long-term friendship with Priscilla Morgan, a New York talent agent and art patron who strove to protect Noguchi's artistic legacy after his death.

In 1955, he designed the sets and costumes for a controversial theatre production of King Lear starring John Gielgud.

In 1962, he was elected to membership in the American Academy of Arts and Letters.

In 1971, he was elected a fellow of the American Academy of Arts and Sciences.

In 1986, he represented the United States at the Venice Biennale, showing a number of his Akari light sculptures.

In 1987, he was awarded the National Medal of Arts.

Isamu Noguchi died on December 30, 1988, at the age of 84 at New York University Medical Center of pneumonia. In its obituary for Noguchi, The New York Times called him "a versatile and prolific sculptor whose earthy stones and meditative gardens bridging East and West have become landmarks of 20th-century art".

== Notable works ==
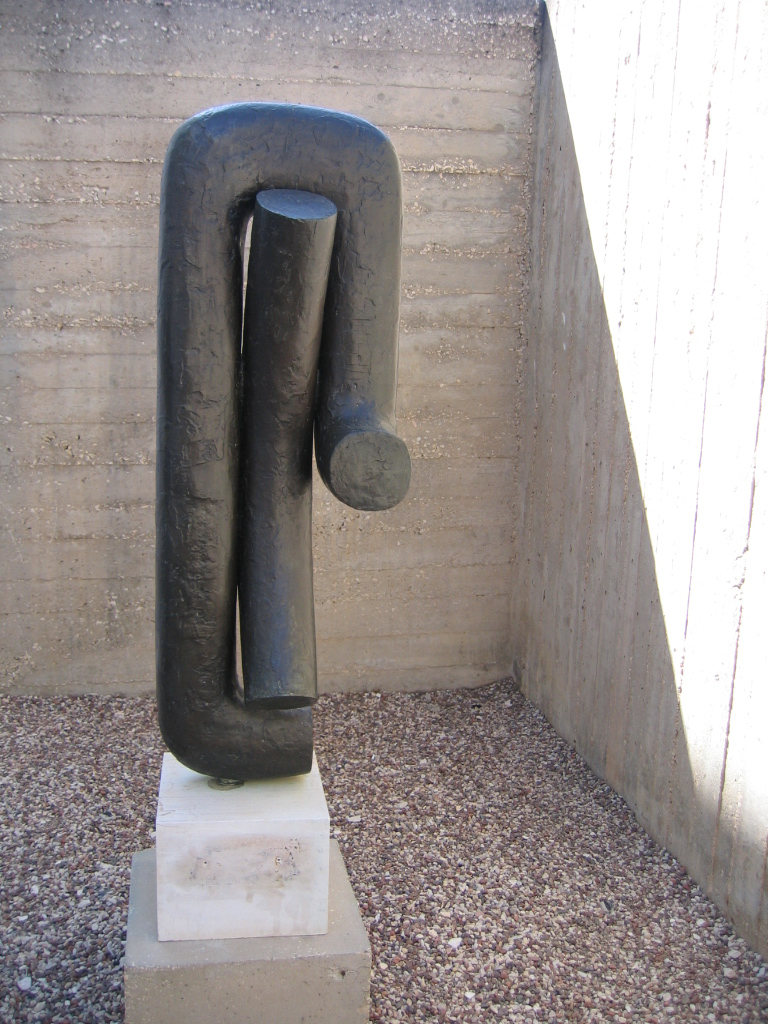
Heimar (1968), at the Billy Rose Sculpture Garden, Israel Museum, Jerusalem, Israel

- Martha Graham (1929), Honolulu Museum of Art, Honolulu, Hawaii
- Tsuneko-san (1931), Honolulu Museum of Art
- News (1938), 50 Rockefeller Plaza
- Lunar Landscape (1943–44), now at Crystal Bridges Museum of American Art
- Coffee Table (1944), an iconic item of Mid-century Modern furniture
- Texas Sculpture (1960–1961), First National Bank of Fort Worth Plaza, Fort Worth, Texas
- Decorative railings for a bridge in Peace Park (1951–1952), Hiroshima, Japan
- 666 Fifth Avenue Ceiling and Waterfall, also known as Landscape of the Cloud (1956–1958), formerly in the lobby of 666 Fifth Avenue, New York City
- Gardens for UNESCO, UNESCO Headquarters (1956–1958), Paris, France
- Floor Frame (1962; castings from 1963 to 1987). A 1963 cast is displayed at The White House Rose Garden, in Washington, D.C.
- The Cry (1962), Albright–Knox Art Gallery, Buffalo, New York
- Sun (1963), The Governor Nelson A. Rockefeller Empire State Plaza Art Collection, Albany, New York
- Sunken Garden for Beinecke Rare Book and Manuscript Library (1960–1964), Yale University, New Haven, Connecticut
- Sunken Garden for Chase Manhattan Bank Plaza (1961–1964), New York City
- Gardens for IBM Headquarters (1964), Armonk, New York
- Billy Rose Sculpture Garden (1960–1965), Israel Museum, Jerusalem
- Children's Land (1965–1966), a temporary children's playground for Kodomo no Kuni, Yokohama, Japan
- Red Cube (1968), HSBC Building, New York City
- Octetra (1968), Crystal Bridges Museum of American Art. It was first located near Spoleto Cathedral It is an abstract painted concrete sculpture.
- Untitled Red (1965–66), Honolulu Museum of Art
- Sky Viewing Sculpture (1969), Western Washington University Public Sculpture Collection, Bellingham, Washington
- Black Sun (1969), Volunteer Park, Seattle, Washington
- Expo '70 Fountains, Osaka, Japan
- Twin Sculptures, Bayerische Vereinsbank, Munich (1970–1972), Munich, Germany
- Playscapes, Piedmont Park, Atlanta, Georgia (1975–1976), a children's playground in Atlanta, Georgia
- Intetra (1976), Society of the Four Arts, Palm Beach, Florida
- Portal (1976), Justice Center Complex, Cleveland, Ohio
- Sky Gate (1976–1977), Honolulu Hale, Honolulu, Hawaii
- Dodge Fountain (1972–1979) and Philip A. Hart Plaza in Detroit, Michigan (created in collaboration with Shoji Sadao)
- Untitled (1981), obsidian and wood sculpture, Honolulu Museum of Art
- California Scenario and Spirit of the Lima Bean (1980–1982), Noguchi Garden, Costa Mesa, California
- To the Issei (1980–1983), Noguchi Plaza, Los Angeles, California
- Bolt of Lightning...A Memorial to Benjamin Franklin (conceived 1933, installed 1984), Franklin Square, Philadelphia, Pennsylvania
- Constellation for Louis Kahn (1983), Kimbell Art Museum, Fort Worth, Texas
- Lillie and Hugh Roy Cullen Sculpture Garden (1986) for the Museum of Fine Arts, Houston, Texas
- Bayfront Park (1980–1996), Miami, Florida
- Moerenuma Park (2004), Sapporo, Japan

His final project was the design for Moerenuma Park, a 400-acre (160 ha) park in Sapporo, Japan. Designed in 1988 shortly before his death, it was completed by Noguchi's partner, Shoji Sadao, and Architects 5. It opened to the public in 2005.

== Gallery ==
Selected works
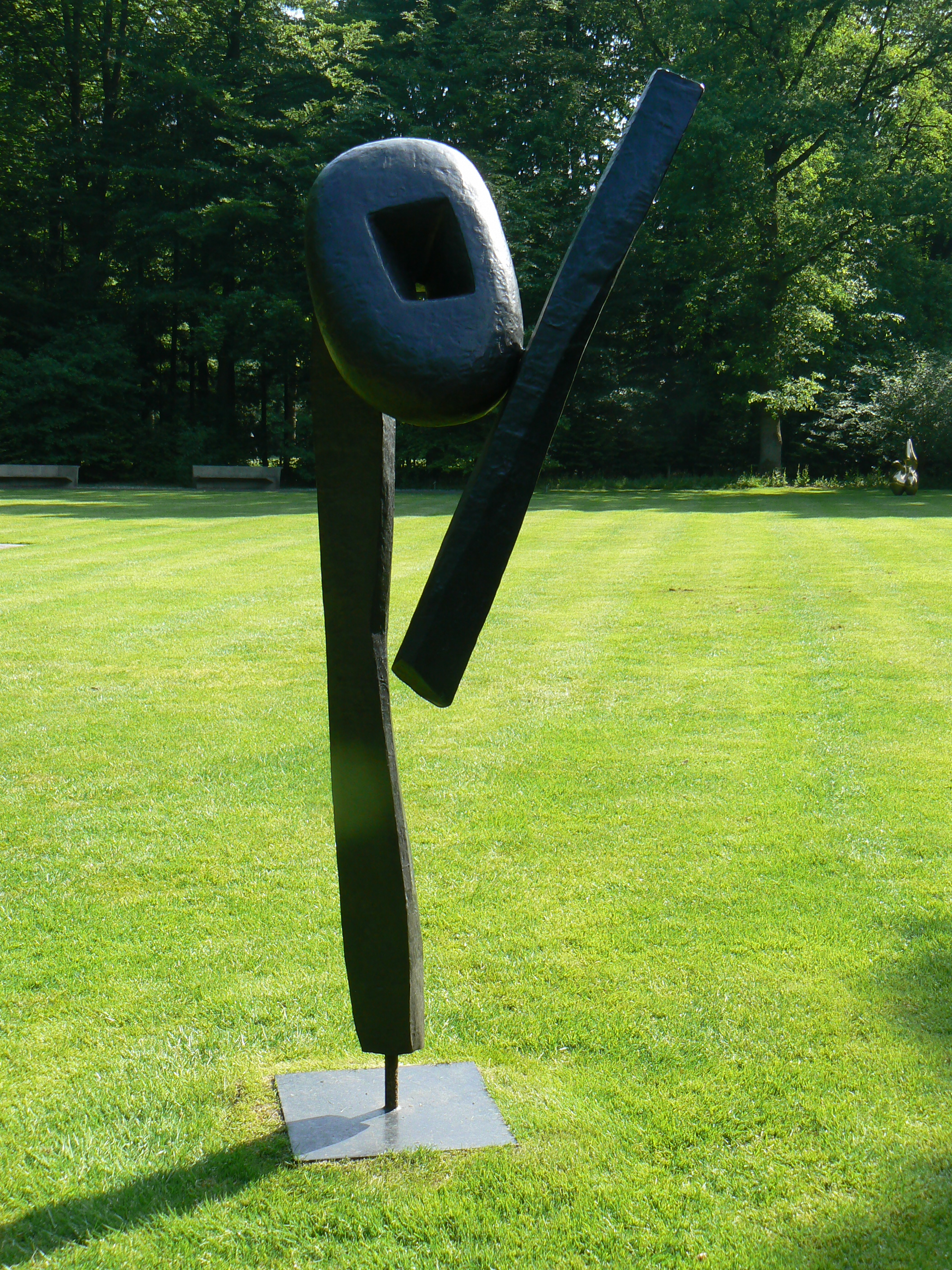
The Cry, Kröller-Müller Museum sculpture park, Otterlo, Netherlands (1959)

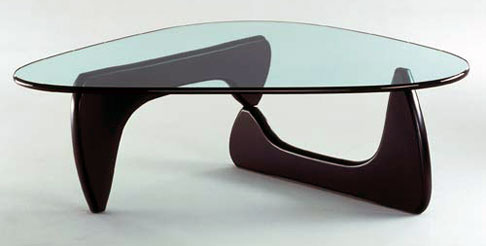
Noguchi table designed by for Herman Miller (1959)

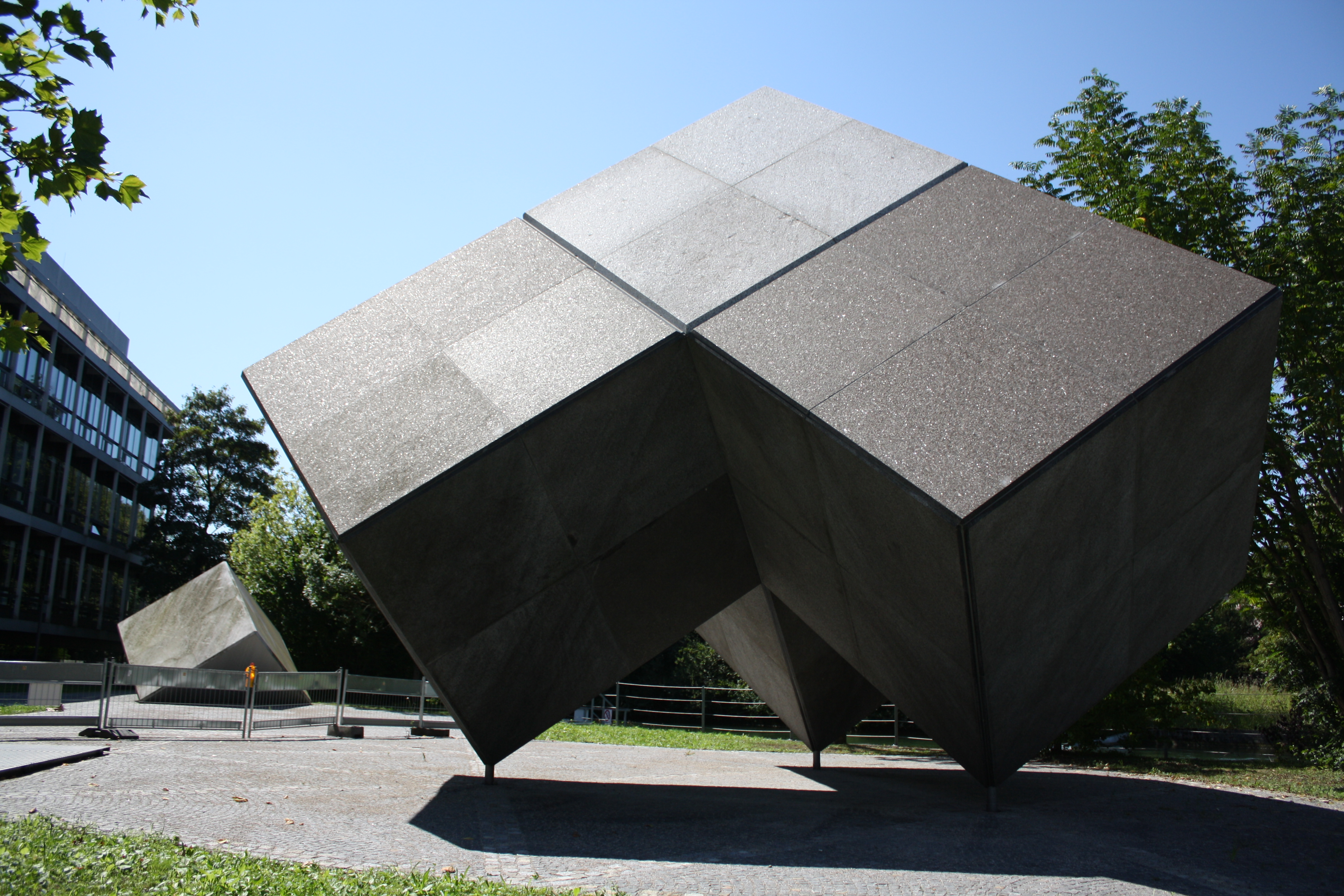
Zwillingsplastik ('Twin sculpture'), Munich, Germany (1972)

== Honors ==
Noguchi received the Edward MacDowell Medal for Outstanding Lifetime Contribution to the Arts in 1982; the National Medal of Arts in 1987; and the Order of the Sacred Treasure from the Japanese government in 1988.

In 2004, the US Postal Service issued a 37-cent stamp honoring Noguchi.

== Legacy ==
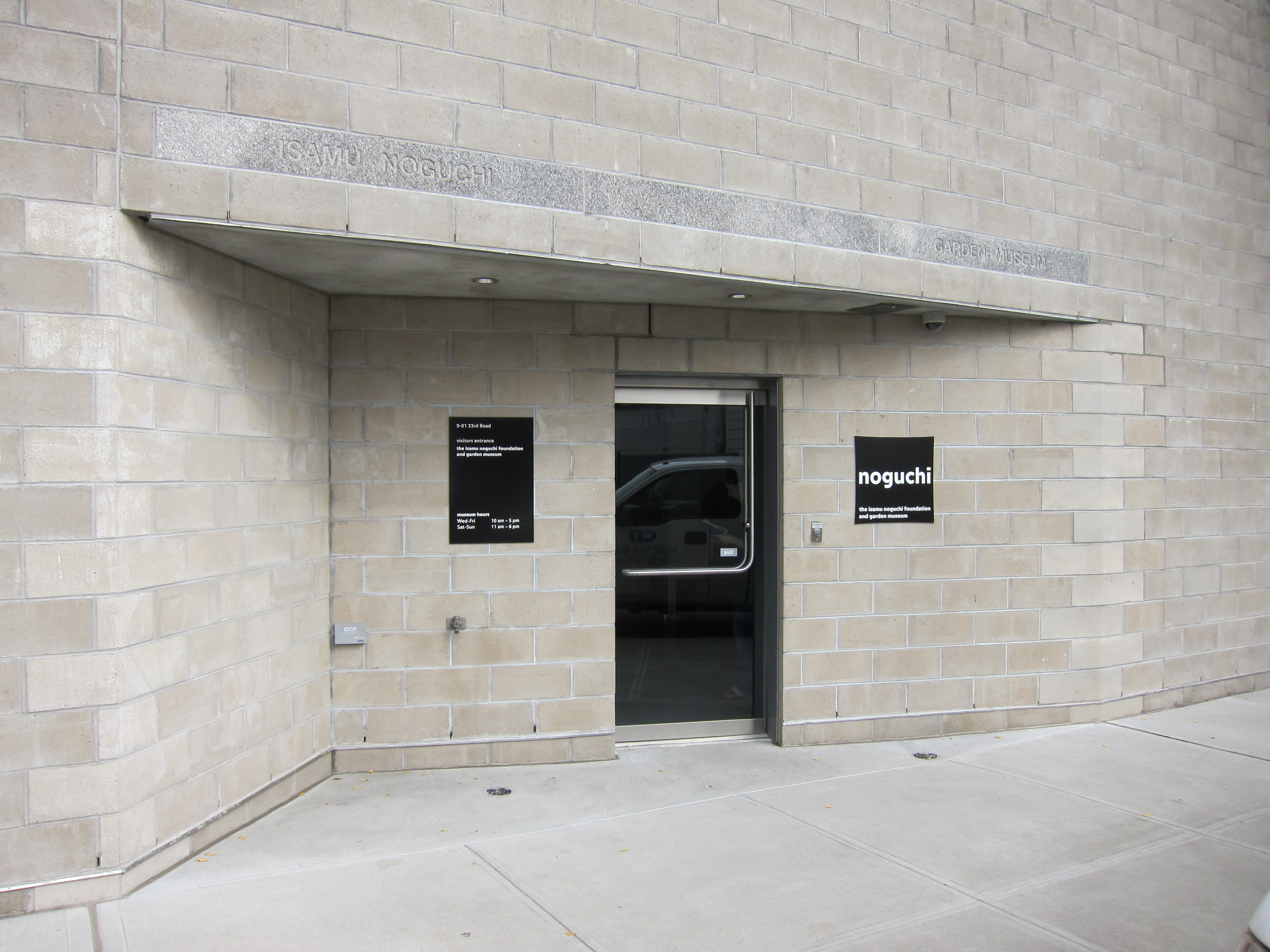
Entrance to Noguchi Museum, New York City

The Isamu Noguchi Foundation and Garden Museum is devoted to the preservation, documentation, presentation, and interpretation of the work of Isamu Noguchi. It is supported by a variety of public and private funding bodies. The US copyright representative for the Isamu Noguchi Foundation and Garden Museum is the Artists Rights Society. In 2012, it was announced that, in order to reduce liability, Noguchi's catalogue raisonné would be published as an online-only, ever-modifiable work-in-progress. It began in 1979 with the publication by Nancy Grove and Diane Botnick for Grove Press. After 1980 Bonnie Rychlak continued the research and became the managing editor of the catalogue until 2011. After 2011, Shaina Larrivee continued the project and 2015, Alex Ross became the managing editor.

=== Exhibition ===
From 16 April – 26 June 1994, the Fundación Juan March, Madrid exhibited Isamu Noguchi, the first retrospective of his work to be held in Spain. The exhibit traveled to Fundación Cataluña-La Pedrera, Barcelona (19 September – 30 November 1994).

In 2016–2017 the Smithsonian American Art Museum displayed Isamu Noguchi, Archaic/Modern featuring works from works made over six decades.

M+ in partnership with the Isamu Noguchi Foundation and Garden Museum organized an exhibition of Isamu Noguchi and Danh Võ. The exhibition took place in the M+ Pavilion, Hong Kong, from November 16, 2018, to April 22, 2019.

In 2025, the Clark Art Institute in Williamstown, Massachusetts exhibited the breadth of his work in Isamu Noguchi: Landscapes of Time.

From February 4, 2026 – September 13, 2026, the Isamu Noguchi Foundation and Garden Museum exhibited Noguchi’s New York which explored Noguchi’s love for the city and how it informed his work.

From April 10 – August 2, 2026, the High Museum of Art will exhibit Isamu Noguchi: “I am not a designer” which “will debut the artist’s first design retrospective in nearly twenty-five years, featuring nearly two hundred objects, many never or rarely exhibited, spanning all facets of his creative output.”

== See also ==
- Wabi-sabi
- Japanese in New York City

== Bibliography ==
- Noguchi, Isamu (1968). A Sculptor's World. Harper & Row.
- Duus, Masayo (2004). The life of Isamu Noguchi: Journey without borders. Translated by Duus, Peter. Princeton University Press. ISBN 0-691-12096-X.
- Kuh, Katherine (1962). The Artist's Voice: Talks with Seventeen Artists. Harper & Row.
- Marika Herskovic, American Abstract Expressionism of the 1950s An Illustrated Survey, (New York School Press, 2003.) ISBN 0-9677994-1-4. p. 254–257
- Marika Herskovic, New York School Abstract Expressionists Artists Choice by Artists, (New York School Press, 2000.) ISBN 0-9677994-0-6. p. 39; p. 270–273
- Lifetime Honors – National Medal of Arts.
- Kenjiro Okazaki, A Place to Bury Names (about Isamu Noguchi and Shirai Seiichi)
