= Herman Miller =

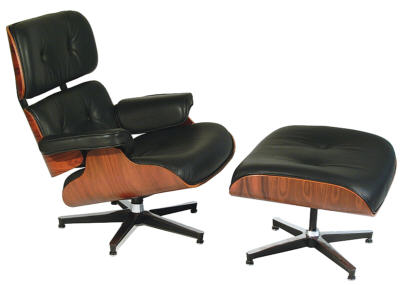
- Lounge chair and ottoman by Charles and Ray Eames
- Type: Public
- Traded as: Nasdaq: MLKN; S&P 600 component
- Industry: Furniture manufacturing Office and home furnishings retailer
- Predecessors: Star Furniture Co.; Michigan Star Furniture Co.; Herman Miller Furniture Company
- Founded: 1905; 121 years ago (as Star Furniture Co.)
- Founder: Dirk Jan DePree
- Headquarters: Zeeland, Michigan, U.S.
- Area served: Worldwide
- Key people: Jeff Stutz CEO
- Revenue: ▲US$3.84 billion (2026)
- Net income: ▲US$91.5 million (2026)
- Number of employees: 10,200 (2024)
- Parent: MillerKnoll
- Website: hermanmiller.com
- Footnotes; Financials as of June 1, 2024.

Herman Miller is an American furniture and design brand based in Zeeland, Michigan known for its contributions to modern furniture design through collaborations with designers including Gilbert Rohde, George Nelson, Charles and Ray Eames, Isamu Noguchi, and Alexander Girard. Some of its best known designs include the Aeron chair, Noguchi table, Marshmallow sofa, Mirra chair, and Eames Lounge Chair and Ottoman. Herman Miller is also credited with the 1968 invention of the office cubicle (originally known as the "Action Office") under then–director of research Robert Propst.

== History ==
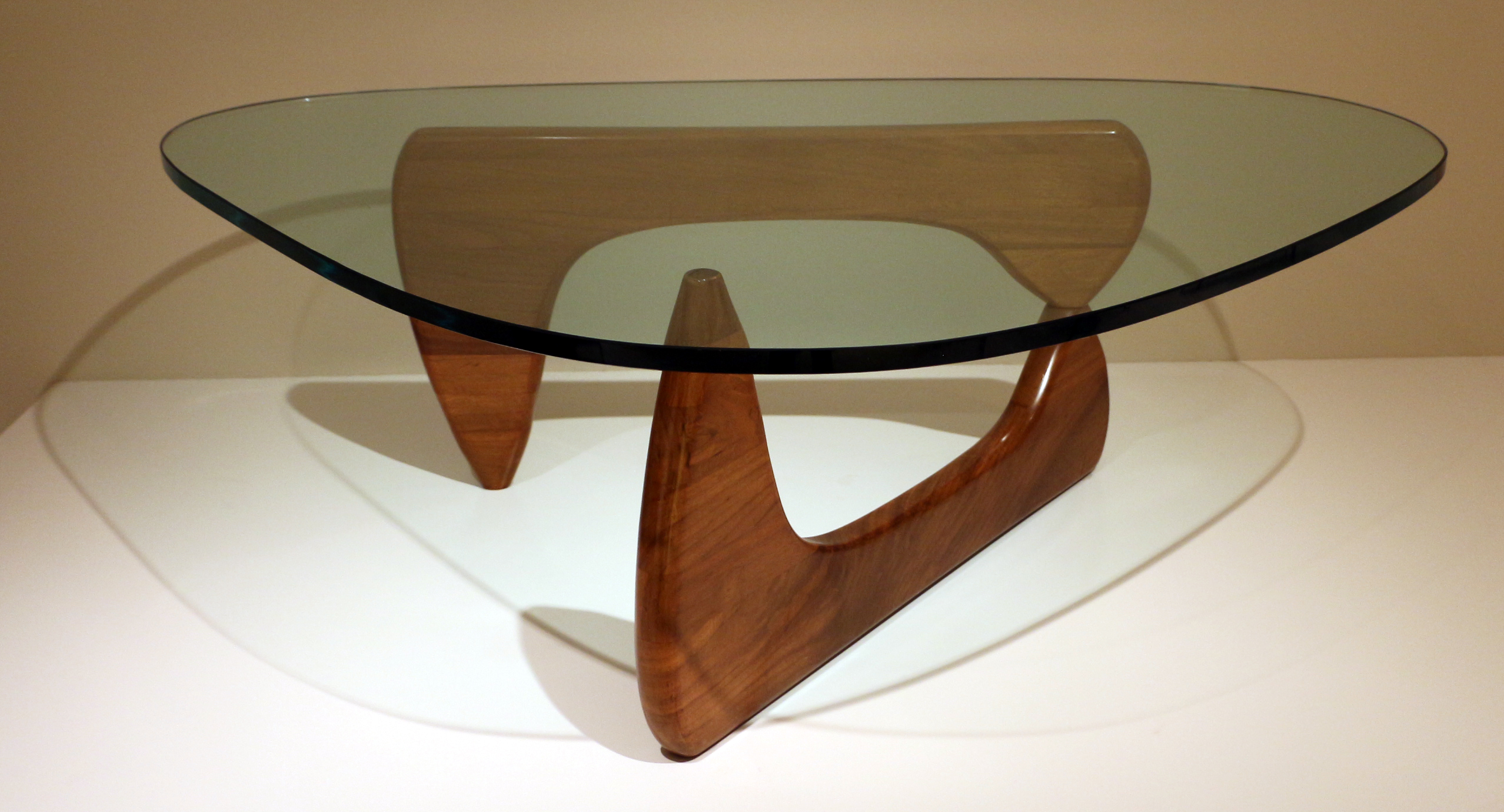
Low table by Isamu Noguchi (1945)

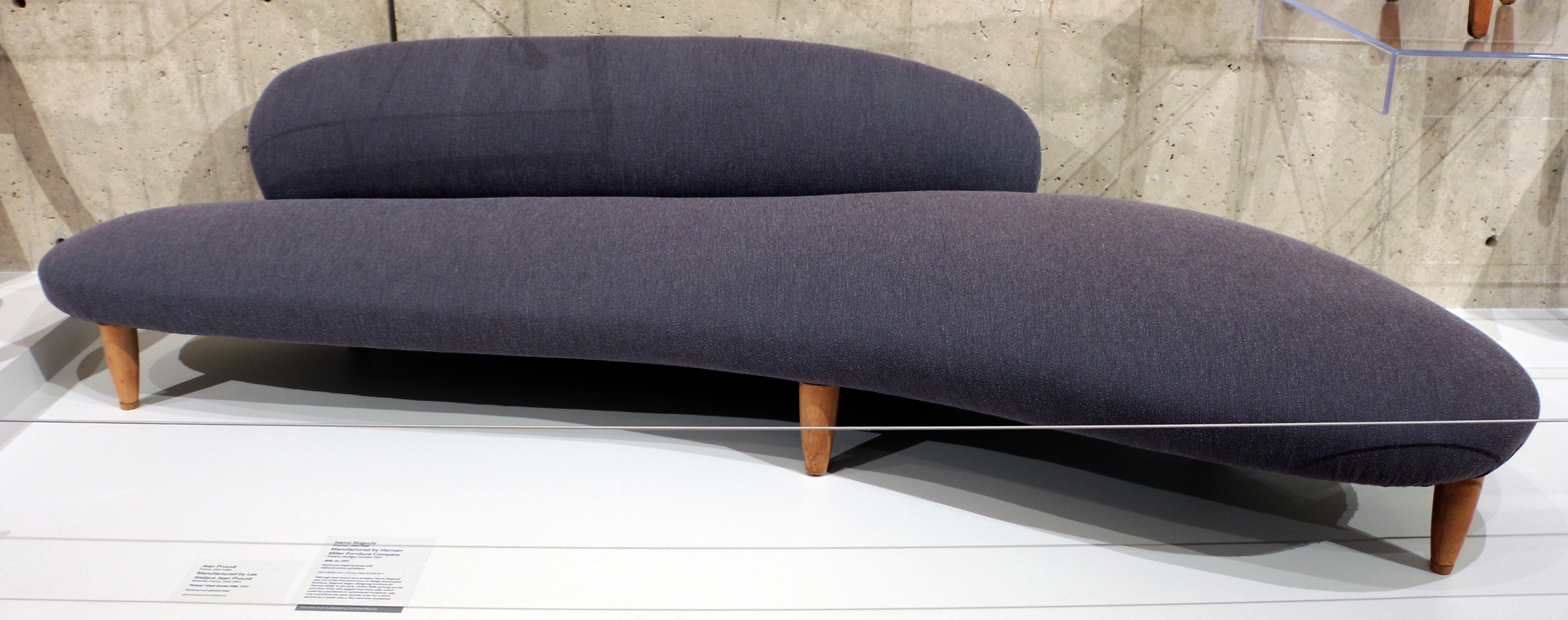
Sofa by Isamu Noguchi (1950)

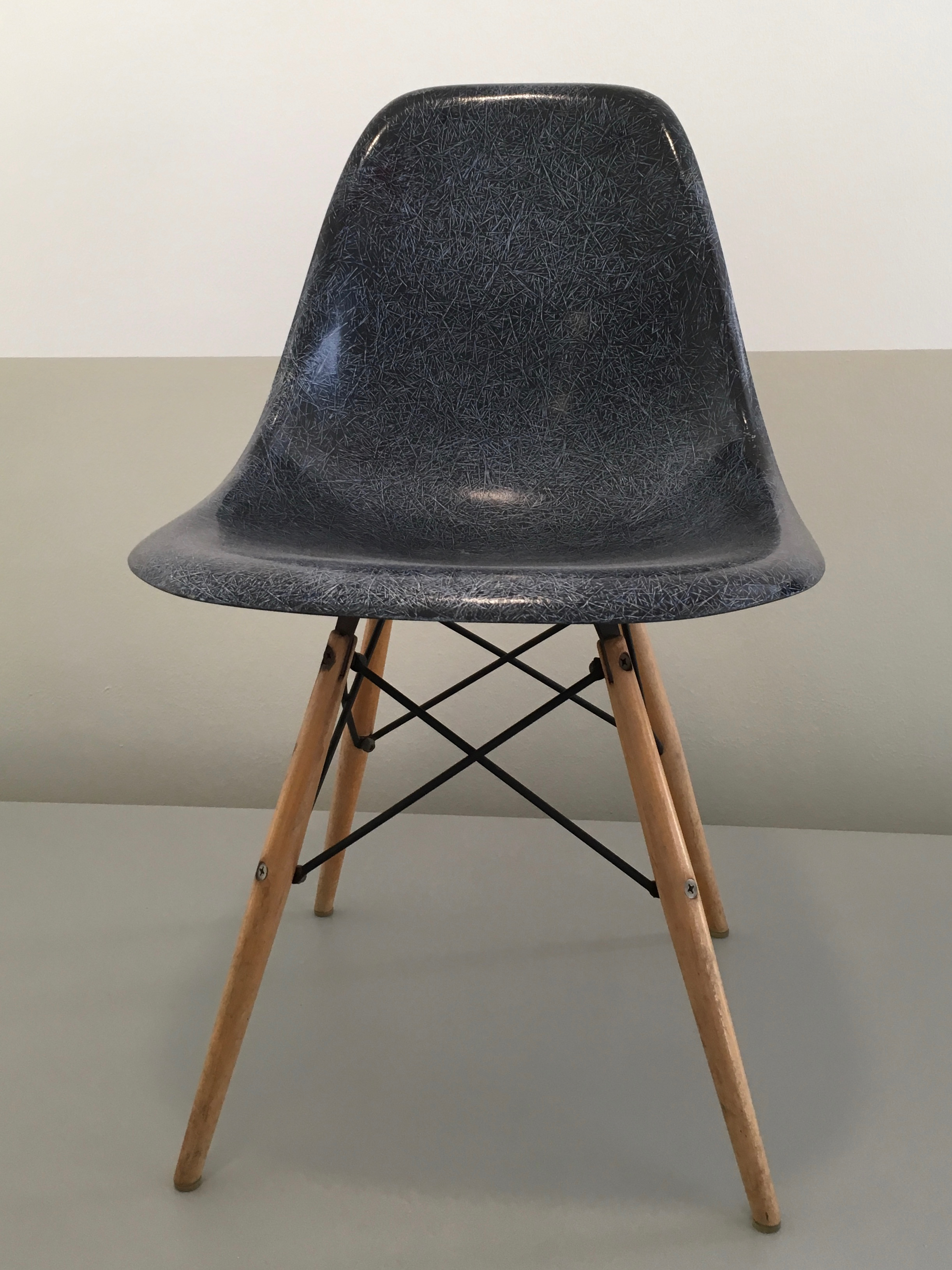
Bucket chair by Charles and Ray Eames (1950–1953)

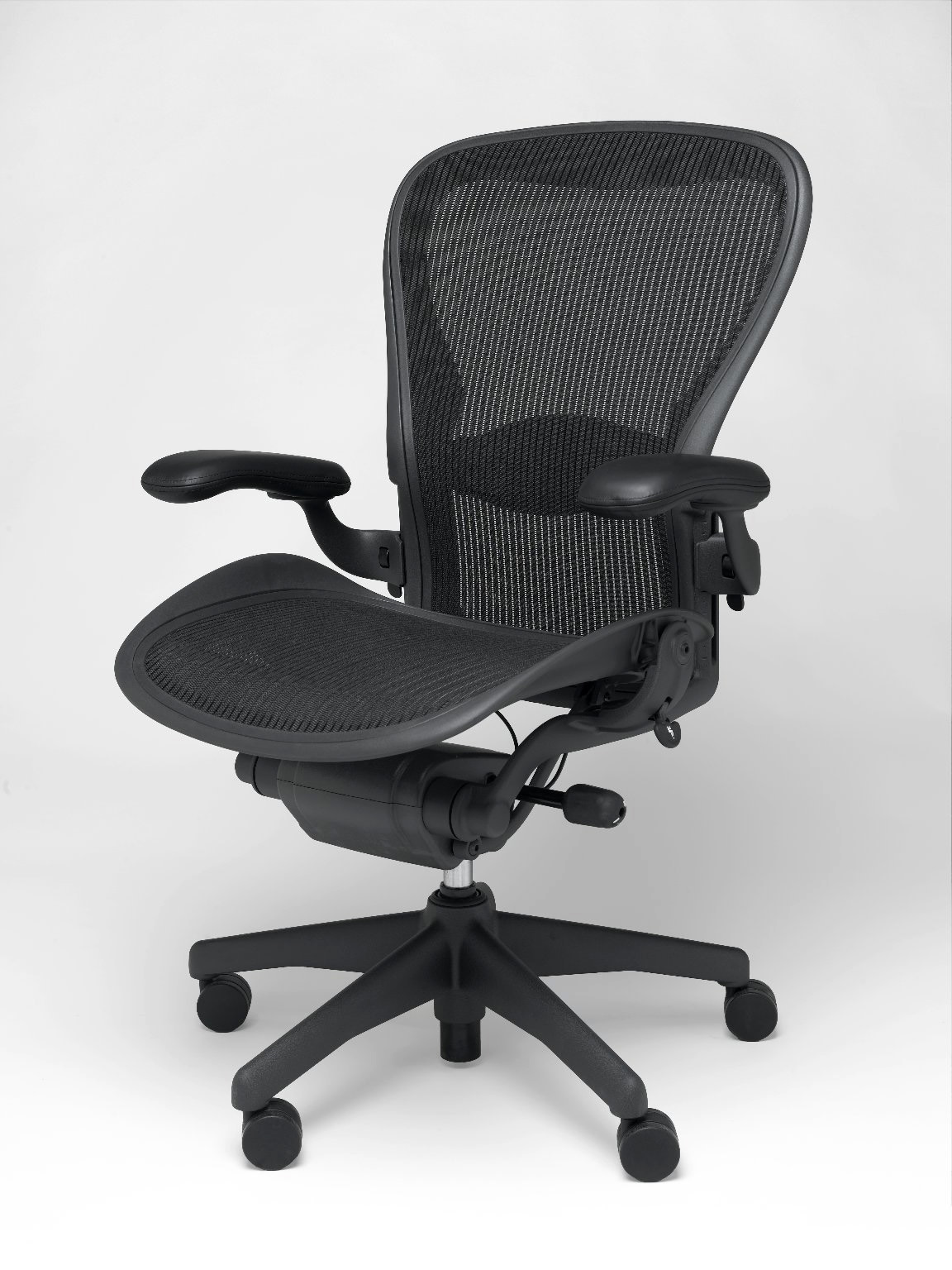
Aeron chair by Don Chadwick and Bill Stumpf (1990s)

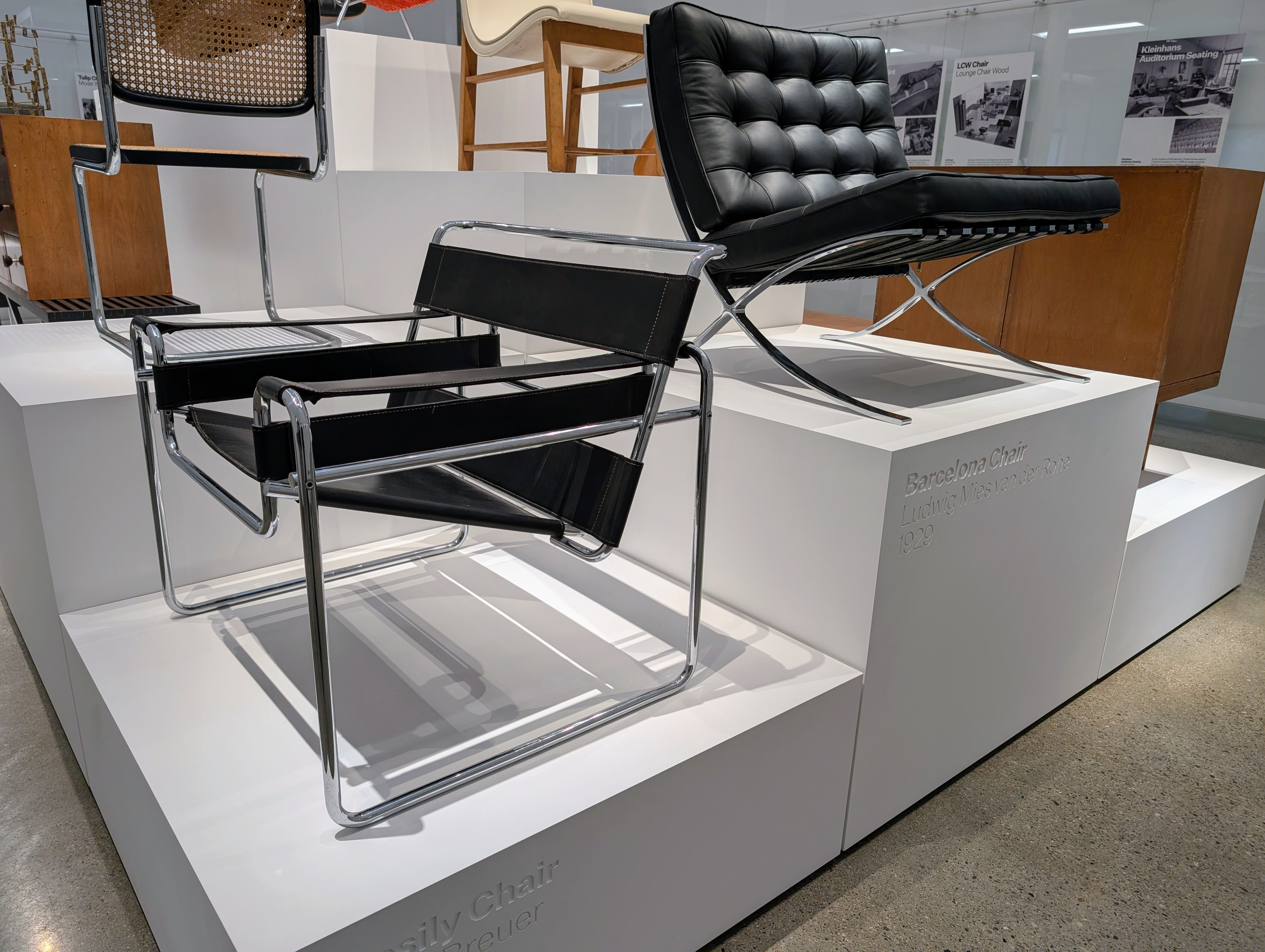
Wassily Chair and Barcelona Chair on display at the MillerKnoll Archives in Holland, Michigan

Herman Miller was founded in 1905 as the Star Furniture Co. In 1919, it was renamed the Michigan Star Furniture Co. under then-president Dirk Jan DePree. DePree and his father-in-law, Herman Miller, (born Harm Mulder on 7 September 1867 in Hoogemeeden, Groningen, Netherlands) acquired most of the company's shares in 1923 and renamed it the Herman Miller Furniture Company.

With the coming of the Great Depression, the company faced bankruptcy until DePree met Gilbert Rohde, an up-and-coming modernist designer. Rohde convinced DePree that the furniture industry's focus on historical reproduction furniture in lieu of new designs was not only out of touch with the consumer, but fundamentally dishonest in the practices used to make furniture pieces appear older and of higher quality than they were. DePree acquired the rights to Rohde's modernist furniture designs in exchange for a three percent royalty on any furniture sold. In 1942, Miller officially joined the office furniture market under Rohde's supervision.

Rohde died in 1944 and was replaced by George Nelson in 1945. Over time, Nelson influenced Herman Miller through both his personal designs and the designers that he recruited, including Isamu Noguchi, Charles and Ray Eames, and textile designer Alexander Girard. This period saw Herman Miller produce some of the company's most recognizable products, including the Noguchi table, Eames Lounge Chair, Marshmallow sofa, Ball clock (actually produced by Howard Miller Clock Company), and the Sling sofa.

The company reformed as Herman Miller, Inc. in 1960.

In 1961, Herman Miller set up the Herman Miller Research Division, based in Ann Arbor, Michigan. This division developed the "Action Office" line in 1964 under the supervision of Robert Propst and with the design assistance of George Nelson's New York design studio. Though the initial line, known as "Action Office I", was not a success, it led Propst to develop the "Action Office II" line, which introduced the office cubicle.

In 1981, Herman Miller started to work with the Italian designer Clino Trini Castelli on the process of designing physical environments, a so-called Design Primario.

In 2021, Herman Miller acquired Knoll and subsequently rebranded as MillerKnoll. Herman Miller continues to operate as a flagship brand within the MillerKnoll collective alongside Knoll, Colebrook Bosson Saunders, Design Within Reach, Edelman, FilzFelt, Geiger, HAY, Holly Hunt, Knoll Textiles, Maharam, Muuto, NaughtOne, and Spinneybeck.

Since then, Herman Miller has expanded its retail footprint through new stores and showrooms, continued to develop products for workplace, residential, and healthcare environments, and maintained production of historic designs by Charles and Ray Eames, George Nelson, Alexander Girard, and Isamu Noguchi.

In 2026, Herman Miller appointed Kim Colin and Sam Hecht of Industrial Facility as Global Creative Directors. According to Architect Magazine, the appointment signaled a renewed focus on design leadership and creative direction across the brand's products, retail experiences, communications, and overall design strategy.

The company also continues to preserve its design legacy through the MillerKnoll Archives, a collection of sketches, prototypes, correspondence, textiles, and other materials documenting the history of Herman Miller and many of the designers associated with the brand.

== Workplace Innovation ==
Herman Miller has been influential in the evolution of workplace design since the mid-20th century. The company introduced the Action Office system, developed under Robert Propst, which helped shape modern office environments and led to the widespread adoption of modular office workstations.

In 1994, Herman Miller introduced the Aeron Chair, designed by Bill Stumpf and Don Chadwick. The chair became one of the brand's best-selling products and was added to the permanent collection of the Museum of Modern Art (MoMA).

According to CNN Money, as of March 2011, Herman Miller was ranked as the second most admired company in the Home Equipment, Furnishing division.

In 2021, Herman Miller introduced the OE1 Workspace Collection, developed in partnership with Industrial Facility to support flexible and hybrid work environments. The collection later received a Fast Company Innovation by Design Award in the Workplaces category.

== Sustainability ==
Herman Miller has engaged in a number of initiatives to promote sustainability. The company has developed a technique of mixing sawdust with chicken manure to produce topsoil. Management of the company has expressed concerns about global warming, and the company was using 27% renewable energy as of 2007.

In 2004, Herman Miller put into place its driving sustainability initiative "Perfect Vision". These targets included zero landfill disposal, zero hazardous waste generation, zero air emissions (VOCs), zero process water discharge, 100% green electrical energy use, company buildings constructed to a minimum LEED Silver certification, and 100% of sales from DfE-approved products.

Herman Miller helped fund the start of the United States Green Building Council, and hired architect William McDonough + Partners to design a factory incorporating green design principles. The building is known as the "Greenhouse", and is an example of green building. The building won the following awards:

- AIA Committee on the Environment Top Ten Environmental Buildings, 1997
- Business Week/Architectural Record Good Design Is Good Business Award, 1997
- AIA Central Virginia Honor Award, 1998
- International Development Research Council, Award for Distinguished Service in Environmental Planning, 1995

Herman Miller has a history of innovation and revisiting designs and materials. In 2026, Herman Miller introduced an updated version of the Aeron Chair featuring recycled nylon, bio-based plastics, and a redesigned aluminum base intended to reduce the chair's environmental footprint. According to Fast Company, the redesign reduced the chair's embodied carbon footprint by 12 percent while preserving the design's durability and performance. The same year, Herman Miller launched a refurbished program that restores pre-owned Aeron Chairs across the United States and Canada.

== Healthcare ==
Herman Miller has maintained a longstanding presence in healthcare environments through products designed for clinical, patient, and caregiver settings. In 2026, the company introduced the Gemma Seating Family, a collection of recliners and sleep solutions for healthcare settings. Health Facilities Management Magazine reported that the collection was designed to support patient comfort and caregiver accessibility through features including sit-to-sleep functionality and mobility-focused design elements.

== Awards ==
- Aeron Chair added to the permanent collection of the Museum of Modern Art (MoMA) (1994)
- Cosm Chair named one of TIME's 100 Best Inventions (2019)
- Aeron Chair named "Design of the Decade" by the Industrial Designers Society of America and BusinessWeek (2000)
- OE1 Workspace Collection won Fast Company's Innovation by Design Award in the Workplaces category (2021)
- OE1 Workspace Collection received Wallpaper*'s Smart Space Award for "Most Futuristic Furniture” (2021)
- Pawson Drift Sofa Group was recognized in The Architect's Newspaper 2025 Best of Products Awards within the Furnishings – Residential category (2025)
- Aeron Chair received the Interior Design HiP Award for Most Iconic Product (2026)

== Notable products ==
- Eames Lounge Chair Wood (1946) – designed by Charles and Ray Eames
- Noguchi table (1948) – designed by Isamu Noguchi
- Eames Shell Chair (1950) – designed by Charles and Ray Eames
- Marshmallow sofa (1954) – designed by Irving Harper
- Eames Lounge Chair and Ottoman (1956) – designed by Charles and Ray Eames
- Eames Aluminum Group Chairs (1958) – designed by Charles and Ray Eames
- Aeron chair (1987) – designed by Bill Stumpf and Don Chadwick
- Mirra (2003) – designed by Studio 7.5
- Embody Chair (2009) – designed by Bill Stumpf and Jeff Weber
- Sayl Chair (2010) – designed by Yves Béhar
- Cosm Chair (2018) – designed by Studio 7.5
- OE1 Workspace Collection (2021) – designed by Kim Colin and Sam Hecht
- Fuld Nesting Chair (2024) – designed by Stefan Diez
