= D. J. De Pree =

American furniture designer (1891-1990)

D.J. DePree
- Born: Dirk Jan DePree; July 31, 1891; Zeeland, Michigan, U.S.
- Died: December 10, 1990 (aged 99); Holland, Michigan, U.S.
- Notable work: Founding president, Herman Miller
- Spouse: Nellie Miller (m. 1914)

Dirk Jan "D.J." DePree (July 31, 1891 – December 10, 1990) was an American furniture designer, and a founding participant and furniture business leader involved in the companies that would become the brand and manufacturer, Herman Miller, under whose company presidency that name was taken—from a participating early investor, his father-in-law, Harm Mulder (whose name was anglicized as the eponymous brand name). The early company DePree ran was a family company, with the elder DePree's involvement—according to his son and subsequent Herman Miller President and CEO, Hugh DePree—spanning from executive decisions regarding furniture design and manufacture, to quality control of its released products.

== Early life and education ==
Dirk Jan DePree was born in Zeeland, Michigan, on July 31, 1891. His father, Pieter (Peter) De Pree, was a tinsmith who was active in local politics. His grandparents were Dutch Calvinists who had immigrated to Zeeland in the late 19th century.

DePree graduated from high school in 1909, and went to work as a clerk for the Michigan Star Furniture Company (also referred to as the Star Furniture Company) in Zeeland, a company formed four years earlier. DePree's job consisted of general office and other work as assigned by his boss.

== Career ==
In 1923, De Pree decided to found his own business, and with help (a loan) from his father-in-law, Harm Mulder—born 7 September 1867 in Groningen, Netherlands—he purchased the Star Furniture Company (also referred to as the Michigan Star Furniture Company), the company for whom he had worked (between them purchasing 51% of the stock). He renamed the company Herman Miller in honor of his investor father-in-law (who was otherwise never active in the business).

As described by Glenn Fowler in his obituary in The New York Times,

For half a century... DePree operated what became a family business. During the Depression he gambled by producing innovative furniture designed by Gilbert Rohde, one of small group of artisans who broke from traditional styling... The gamble paid off, and by 1945 Mr. DePree had phased out... traditional furniture to concentrate on designs by... Rohde, Charles Eames, Alexander Girard, George Nelson and Robert Propst, all... counter to the prevailing designs... DePree was responsible for milestones like the "House of Tomorrow" at the 1934 Chicago World's Fair and innovations in the 1940's and 50's, including the modular wall storage system, the molded plywood chair, the molded plastic chair and stacking chairs.

In 1960, DePree contracted an illness, and he stepped down as CEO in 1961. The new management team at Herman Miller consisted of sons Hugh DePree and Max DePree, with D.J. continuing as chairman emeritus.

== Personal life ==
In 1914, DePree married Nellie Miller, daughter of Harm Mulder, whose name was anglicized and would become the eponymous brand name, Herman Miller. That marriage produced three sons, two of whom would eventually join their father in the business. He also had four daughters.

DePree served as Pastor of Ventura Baptist Church in Holland, Michigan and served the church as Sunday School teacher for about 20 years, having started there in 1955 as its first, lay pastor, and overseeing years of its growth. He has also been described as having been a member of First Baptist Church in Zeeland.

DePree died on Monday December 10, 1990, at the Fountain View Retirement Village in Holland, Michigan. He was 99 years old.
