= Workplace strategy =

Pattern of a organization's work

Workplace Strategy is the dynamic alignment of an organization's work patterns with the work environment to enable peak performance and reduce costs.

== Components and aims ==
The role of the person charged with developing the strategy, the 'workplace strategist', is to understand the organisation's requirements and recommend a workplace solution that will help them meet their current and future needs. The workplace strategy may facilitate meeting business objectives such as: reducing property costs, improving business performance, merging two or more organisations/cultures, and relocating or consolidating occupied buildings. In more simple terms, the workplace strategy provides a response to either running out of space, having too much space, or wanting to introduce organisational change. The workplace strategy and its implementation quite often occur at an opportune moment such as a property lease break or a company merger or acquisition.

The proposed workplace strategy will focus on how to use the space more efficiently and effectively. Recommendations often include moving from cellular (predominantly private office) environments to open plan, or introducing new ways of working and moving to a flexible working environment, as first proposed by Frank Duffy in the nineties. At around the same time, Erik Veldhoen, a Dutch based consultant and workplace strategist 'avant la lettre', developed the so-called 'activity based design approach'. It was the first integrated design approach ever developed, combining insights from different disciplines including design, ICT, social organization and management. With this methodology he was able to realize the first 'activity-based' work environment for Interpolis, an insurance company, based in Tilburg (The Netherlands). An 'Activity Based' Work Environment is where the occupants have access to a range of work settings, including working at home or on the move, but also share workstations, often referred to as hot desking or the related Hoteling. Since 2001, the concept of coworking space has also provided options for the startups, freelancers and companies who prefer this plug-and-play solution with shorter lease terms commitment.

With the fourth industrial revolution, people have questioned the relevance of physical workspace and workplace strategy as team may work remotely outside an office space. The meaning and purpose of work spaces is changing to align with the organisation's growth strategy. Following the COVID-19 pandemic, workplace strategies have paid particular attention to hybrid workplace strategy and the challenge of having work-from-home staff return to the office.

Easy to follow reviews of how to develop a workplace strategy are provided by Eley and Marmot and Springer.

== Workplace consultants ==
Workplace strategies tend to be developed by specialist workplace consultants or the service may provided from within an architectural practice. Savage notes that:

"The successful implementation of a workplace strategy requires an interdisciplinary team, internal and external to the organization ... A workplace consultant may be retained to engage the team, help define success criteria, manage the process, and assess results."

External workplace consultants are professionals from a number of backgrounds: business management, interior design and architecture, building surveying, real estate and facilities management, human resources and building research.

== Research ==
Research is currently underway by the General Services Administration to test the impact of workplace strategies, design, and new technologies on business performance.

The evidence available to determine the effectiveness of health-promoting policies in workplaces such as healthy catering policies; point-of-purchase nutrition labeling; environmental supports for healthy eating and physical activity; control policies; weight management programmes are sparse and inconsistent. There is low certainty of evidence that the strategies make little or no benefits in employee's health behaviours. It is also uncertain whether such strategies are cost-effective.

== In Ireland ==
The National Centre for Partnership and Performance in Ireland has established a "National Workplace Strategy" defined as:

"the Government's blueprint to help transform Ireland's workplaces into Workplaces of the Future, by promoting greater levels of partnership-led change and innovation in our places of work, regardless of size or sector. As Ireland continues its economic and social transition to a knowledge-based economy and society, the Strategy's underlying premise is that all companies and organisations can achieve improved performance and an enhanced Quality of working life by improving their capacity to manage change and innovation within the workplace."

== In Singapore ==
An example of government-led workplace strategy initiatives can be seen in Singapore, where the Ministry of Manpower established the Workplace Policy and Strategy Division in 2006 to coordinate nation-wide workplace policies. This division works with tripartite partners -- government agencies, employers, and labour organisations to develop frameworks related to employment practices, workplace inclusivity, occupational safety and health, and the management of foreign labour. It also contributes to international labour cooperation through engagement with bilateral and multilateral counterparts. Such initiatives illustrate how workplace strategy can be implemented at a policy level to influence labour market structures and organisational practices.

== See also ==
- Booster breaks in the workplace
