= Pace layers =

Conceptual framework describing layers of a system that change at different rates

Pace layers (also pace layering) is a conceptual framework developed by Stewart Brand that describes how complex systems are composed of interacting layers, each changing at a different rate. First presented in Brand's 1999 book The Clock of the Long Now, the framework identifies six layers of civilization—fashion, commerce, infrastructure, governance, culture, and nature—ordered from fastest-changing to slowest. The concept has been applied in fields including enterprise architecture and organizational theory.

== Origins ==
The concept is rooted in hierarchical theories of ecosystems and the work of British architect Frank Duffy. Ecological scientists observed that biological habitats are organized in interdependent hierarchies of layers that change at comparable paces, with slower layers conditioning faster ones. Expanding this hierarchical thinking to the study of architecture and facilities management, Duffy argued in 1990 that "a building properly conceived is several layers of longevity of built components" and identified layers he called "shearing layers," each evolving at a different pace.

Stewart Brand built on Duffy's work in his 1994 book How Buildings Learn: What Happens After They're Built, expanding the model to six shearing layers—site, structure, skin, services, space plan, and stuff—and emphasizing that an adaptive building must allow these differently paced layers to "slip" past one another rather than being rigidly coupled. Brand later recast these building layers as "pace layers" to emphasize the temporal differences across and within them, and generalized the concept beyond architecture to describe how entire civilizations function. He presented this broader framework in The Clock of the Long Now in 1999, and published a revised treatment in the MIT Press Journal of Design and Science in 2018.

== Framework ==
The pace layers model identifies six layers of civilization, ordered from fastest to slowest rate of change:

1. Fashion/Art — the fastest layer. Experimental, volatile, and culturally generative.
2. Commerce — driven by market competition; absorbs innovations from fashion and transmits viable ones downward.
3. Infrastructure — roads, communications networks, and other systems that change slowly due to cost and complexity.
4. Governance — legal and political systems; slower still, constrained by the need for legitimacy and stability.
5. Culture — deeply held beliefs, values, and practices that shift over generations.
6. Nature — the slowest layer; ecological and climatic processes operating on timescales of centuries to millennia.

Brand summarized the dynamics between layers: "Fast learns, slow remembers. Fast proposes, slow disposes." In a healthy system, faster layers drive innovation while slower layers provide stability and continuity. Pathologies arise when layers are forced to operate at inappropriate speeds; for example, when commercial pressures drive natural systems to change faster than they can sustain, or when governance is disrupted suddenly rather than evolving gradually.

== Applications ==
In a 2022 article in the Journal of Management Studies, management scholars Matthew Beane and Paul Leonardi applied the pace layers framework to organizational theory, proposing that organizations, like buildings, consist of layers that evolve at different speeds. The authors identified six organizational pace layers: field, strategy, symbols, infrastructure, structure, and tools. They argued that managing the friction between them requires new forms of coordination work.

== See also ==
- Shearing layers
- Stewart Brand
- Systems thinking
