= Chelsea Pottenger =

Australian educator & author

- Born: Australia
- Education: Postgraduate degree in psychology
- Occupations: Mental Health and Resilience, keynote speaker
- Title: Founder and Director of EQ Minds
- Website: Official website

Chelsea Pottenger is an Australian mental health educator, author, and keynote speaker. She is the founder and managing director of EQ Minds, a corporate mental health consultancy located in New South Wales. Pottenger focuses on workplace wellbeing, mindfulness, and mental health awareness, offering training programs and engaging in public speaking and media contributions to address these topics.

== Early life and education ==
Chelsea Pottenger was born and raised in Australia, where she developed an interest in sports and education. She represented New South Wales in junior basketball and later received a basketball scholarship to attend Oral Roberts University in the United States. Pottenger graduated with a Bachelor of Commerce from the University of Wollongong in 2002 and subsequently completed a Graduate Diploma in Psychology from the University of Adelaide, which contributed to her future career in mental health advocacy and education.

== Career ==
Pottenger worked for more than 15 years in the corporate sector, including roles at Johnson & Johnson. After experiencing postnatal depression following the birth of her daughter, she transitioned to focus on mental health advocacy. In 2016, Pottenger founded EQ Minds, a business she operates alongside General Manager Jay Pottenger that provides corporate workshops, keynote presentations, and workshop programs focused on enhancing mental health and performance in professional environments.

Through EQ Minds, she has collaborated with various global brands and business leaders to train psychology-based wellbeing strategies suitable to corporate teams. Pottenger's expertise has been highlighted in national media outlets such as Mamamia and Body+Soul, where she has provided mental health advice and commentary.

Pottenger has served as a keynote speaker at professional development events, including leadership and wellbeing forums in the real estate and corporate sectors.

== Advocacy ==
Pottenger is an ambassador for The Gidget Foundation Australia, a non-profit organisation that supports parents facing perinatal depression and anxiety. She has also been involved with the R U OK? campaign, which promotes open and supportive discussions about mental health.

== Publications ==
In 2020, she published The Mindful High Performer: Simple yet powerful shift to recharge your mental health and perform at your best in work and life, which provides practical guidance on managing stress and cultivating mindfulness. The book has been highlighted in health and lifestyle media and is part of her broader efforts to make mental wellbeing tools accessible to professional audiences.

== Awards ==
In 2022, Pottenger received the Mental Health Advocate of the Year (NSW) award from Mental Health Foundation Australia.

In 2026, Pottenger received the Alumni Award for Professional Excellence from the University of Wollongong.
