= Samuel Culbert =

American professor (born 1938)

Samuel A. Culbert
- Born: Chicago

Samuel A. Culbert (born July 27, 1938) is a professor at UCLA Anderson School of Management, in the fields of organizational theory and applied behavioral science. He is known for his "trans-organizational" research methodology commentaries on workplace dynamics, identification of mismanagement practices, and theories on the sources of workplace-induced alienation.

== Early life and education ==
Culbert acquired a systems-oriented logic studying for a B.S. in industrial engineering at Northwestern University (1961) and developed a clinician's intuition and investigative skills earning a Ph.D. in clinical psychology at UCLA (1966). In tandem with clinical internships, Culbert joined up with business school social scientists researching the use of small group dynamics principles in conducting Sensitivity Training courses and workshops (T-groups).

In 1966, Culbert received a USPH United States Public Health Service Fellowship to summer intern with The NTL Institute for Applied Behavioral Science. On conclusion, he was recruited to serve as Program Director in Organization Studies and Director of Intern Training at NTL, positions deferred until 1967 due to UCLA teaching commitments. Concomitant to his NTL assignments, Culbert taught courses in three departments (Psychology, Education, and Government and Public Affairs) at George Washington University.

After finishing his NTL assignment in 1969, Culbert returned to UCLA where he began what would become a 50-year professorship at the Anderson School of Management. Culbert was drawn to the human systems issues being explored by colleagues affiliating with The Quality of Working Life (QWL) movement—an international network of researchers, theorists, social activists, and industrial leaders taking action to achieve a higher-order trans-organizational plane.

He has become known for his trans-organizational research methodology, commentaries on workplace dynamics, identification of mismanagement practices, and theorizing about the sources of workplace-induced alienation with human-system revisionary approaches for reducing them. Culbert's writings encourage the individual's emancipation from organization and work-culture imposed constraints to effectiveness, promote the ever-present pursuit of self-awareness, authenticity, and other-sensitive interactions in life and work. Among these writings is “An Anatomy of Activism for Executives,” for which he and co-writer James Elden received the Harvard Business Review McKinsey Award.

== Academic career ==
Culbert worked as an associate professorial lecturer at George Washington University from 1968 to 1969. He then returned to UCLA's Anderson School of Management as a professor in 1969.

His research interests involves the use of human-systems approaches associated with the Quality of working life (QWL) movement to improve corporate management.

== Books ==
Culbert has written and co-authored eight books on features of leadership, management, and professional participation in contemporary organizations.

- The Organization Trap and How to Get Out of It (1974). Basic Books ISBN 0-465-05320-3
- The Invisible War: Pursuing Self-Interests at Work (1980). with John J. McDonough, John Wiley ISBN 0-02-905940-2
- Radical Management: Power Politics and The Pursuit of Trust (1985) with John J. McDonough. The Free Press. ISBN 0-02-905940-2
- Mindset Management: The Heart of Leadership (1996). Oxford University Press. ISBN 0-19-509746-7
- Samuel A. Culbert; John B. Ullmen. (2001) Don’t Kill the Bosses! Escaping the Hierarchy Trap. Berrett-Koehler Publishers. ISBN 978-1576751619
- Samuel A. Culbert. (2008) Beyond Bullsh*t: Straight-Talk at Work. Stanford University Press. ISBN 978-0804758857 SmartMoney's Top 10 Reads picks and finalist for the 2008 National Best Book Awards.
- Samuel A. Culbert with Lawrence Rout (2010) Get Rid of the Performance Review! How Companies Can Stop Intimidating, Start Managing, and Focus on Getting Results. Business Plus (Hachette). ISBN 978-0446556057
- Samuel A. Culbert (2017) Good People, Bad Managers: How Work Culture Corrupts Good Intentions. Oxford University Press. ISBN 978-0190652395
