= Coffeeland =

2020 non-fiction book by Augustine Sedgewick

- Author: Augustine Sedgewick
- Language: English
- Publisher: Penguin Books, Allen Lane
- Publication date: 2020
- Publication place: United States
- ISBN: 978-1594206153

Coffeeland: One Man's Dark Empire and the Making of Our Favorite Drug is a 2020 non-fiction book by Augustine Sedgewick. It's a social, economic, and political history of the production and use of coffee and its effect on society — "A history that charts the 400-year transformation of coffee from a mysterious Ottoman custom to an everyday necessity for many."

This is the first book by Sedgewick (born 1979, Portland, Maine) who earned his Ph.D. from Harvard University. He had previously published articles in the journals International Labor and Working-Class History and History of the Present.

Michael Pollan published an extensive review of Coffeeland in The Atlantic. Pollan's review describes how Sedgewick ties the advent of coffee to the rise of modern capitalism, as its replacement of alcohol as workers' common workplace beverage allowed the burgeoning white-collar cohort to work longer hours with improved focus on office tasks, coffee being "a form of instant energy — a work drug", this becoming the basis of the coffee break — an institution originated to benefit the employer (by energizing workers), not the employee.

Sedgewick also focuses on the production history of coffee. He details the story of James Hill, an Englishman who applied industrial methods — sometimes brutal — to the growing of coffee in El Salvador, creating a rigid monoculture of coffee and a pool of native workers driven by hunger — their native food sources having been deliberately destroyed — to work the coffee plantations. "Eventually, he even recoiled at the sound of workers' laughter, because it meant they were squandering time and energy that belonged to him."

[Sedgewick's] literary gifts and prodigious research make for a deeply satisfying reading experience studded with narrative surprise. Sedgewick has a knack for the sparkling digression and arresting jump cut, hopping back and forth between El Salvador and the wider world, where coffee was being consumed in ever-increasing quantities

— Michael Pollan, The Atlantic

Coffeeland was also reviewed by Publishers Weekly, The Economist, and Kirkus Reviews.
