= Jay Pottenger =

Australian executive

- Born: Australia
- Education: Postgraduate degree in Mental Health and Neuroscience
- Occupations: Corporate wellness executive, keynote speaker
- Years active: 2005
- Title: General Manager of EQ Minds
- Website: Official website

Jay Pottenger, is an Australian corporate wellbeing executive and keynote speaker. He is the General Manager of EQ Minds, a corporate wellbeing business that offers training programs to businesses internationally. His work focuses on workplace productivity, burnout prevention, and the use of neuroscience in professional performance.

== Early life and education ==
Pottenger was raised in Australia and participated in competitive athletics during his youth. He pursued academic studies in psychological health and neuroscience, completing postgraduate qualifications in these fields. He also received formal accreditation as a mindfulness and meditation coach. Pottenger played basketball during his youth, representing the Australian schoolboys national team and later competing at a semi-professional level. He attended the University of Wollongong, where he earned a Bachelor of Commerce degree with a major in Finance and Economics.

== Career ==
Before entering the field of organisational wellbeing, Pottenger worked for 15 years in the corporate and financial sectors. His experiences in these high-pressure environments informed his later focus on corporate wellbeing, particularly in relation to burnout and workplace stress.

In 2013, Pottenger experienced a significant physical injury involving multiple herniated spinal discs, which required emergency hospitalisation and rehabilitation. This event, along with his experiences in high-stress corporate finance environments and personal involvement with family mental health issues, contributed to his transition into occupational health and performance psychology. Pottenger completed a postgraduate qualification in Mental Health and Neuroscience and obtained professional accreditation as a mindfulness and meditation instructor.

In 2019, Pottenger joined EQ Minds, an organisation founded by Chelsea Pottenger. As General Manager, he is responsible for overseeing the company's business operations and strategy. The business provides keynotes and workshops on mental fitness and sustainable high performance to a range of multinational corporations.

His presentations and workshop address topics including neuroscience, performance psychology, stress management, cognitive energy, and burnout prevention, and have been delivered to various multinational corporations.

== Public speaking and advocacy ==
• Energy Management, it refers to techniques aimed at preventing burnout by balancing periods of intensive cognitive activity with planned recovery.

• Corporate Mindfulness involves adapting traditional meditation and mindfulness practices into practical habits for everyday business settings.

• Ruthless Prioritisation, it involves tactical methods for managing heavy workloads and reducing workplace distractions.
