= The Architect and His Office =

The Architect and His Office was a landmark report about the state of the British architectural profession in the early 1960s. It was commissioned by the Royal Institute of British Architects in 1960 and the report was published in February 1962 with an introduction by William Holford, then President of the institute. Running to more than 250 pages, the report examined architectural education, fees and salaries, and management and technical competence. It was based on extensive fieldwork including a questionnaire survey and visits to nearly 70 architects' offices of various kinds. Funding of slightly more than £11,000 was provided for the study by the Leverhulme Trust.

According to architect Frank Duffy the study stands as one of the best studies of a profession ever carried out anywhere in the world. Duffy considers that the study did much to reform architectural practices in Britain, particularly by contributing to the development of the RIBA Plan of Work, a set of discrete stages of the architect's work from inception to completion. As well as each stage being precisely described, the stages also had a precise fraction of the total architect's fee associated with them. However, as Duffy also comments, the identification of the usual work pattern as 'normal services' also implied that many activities known as 'other services' (management, surveying, engineering) lay outside the work of the architect, and architects lost market share as a consequence of such exclusivity.
