= Peter Cassells =

Irish trade union leader

Peter Cassells (born 1949) is an Irish former trade union leader.

Born in Navan, the older brother of Gaelic footballer Joe Cassells, Peter worked for the herbalist Sean Boylan before moving to Dublin and finding employment at the Department of Social Welfare. While there, he completed a part-time degree in economic and social policy, and met his first wife, Marina.

Cassells moved to work for the Irish Congress of Trade Unions (ICTU) in the mid-1970s. Marina died at the age of 29 from leukaemia, and Cassells then devoted much of his time to the trade union movement, becoming its Economic and Social Affairs Officer, then General Secretary from 1989. As General Secretary, he oversaw the development of the Social Partnership arrangements, and when he stood down in 2001, he became chair of the National Centre for Partnership and Performance, and also spent three years as chair of Forfás.

At the 2004 European Parliament election, Cassells stood as the Labour Party candidate in the East constituency, but was narrowly defeated. While remaining active in Labour, he supported the Fianna Fáil candidacy of his nephew, Shane Cassells.

Retiring in 2019, Cassell chaired the Edward M. Kennedy Centre for Conflict Intervention at the National University of Ireland Maynooth, serving on the council of the European Movement Ireland, working as an independent consultant and mediator, and sat on a number of boards.
