= Break (work) =

Period of time

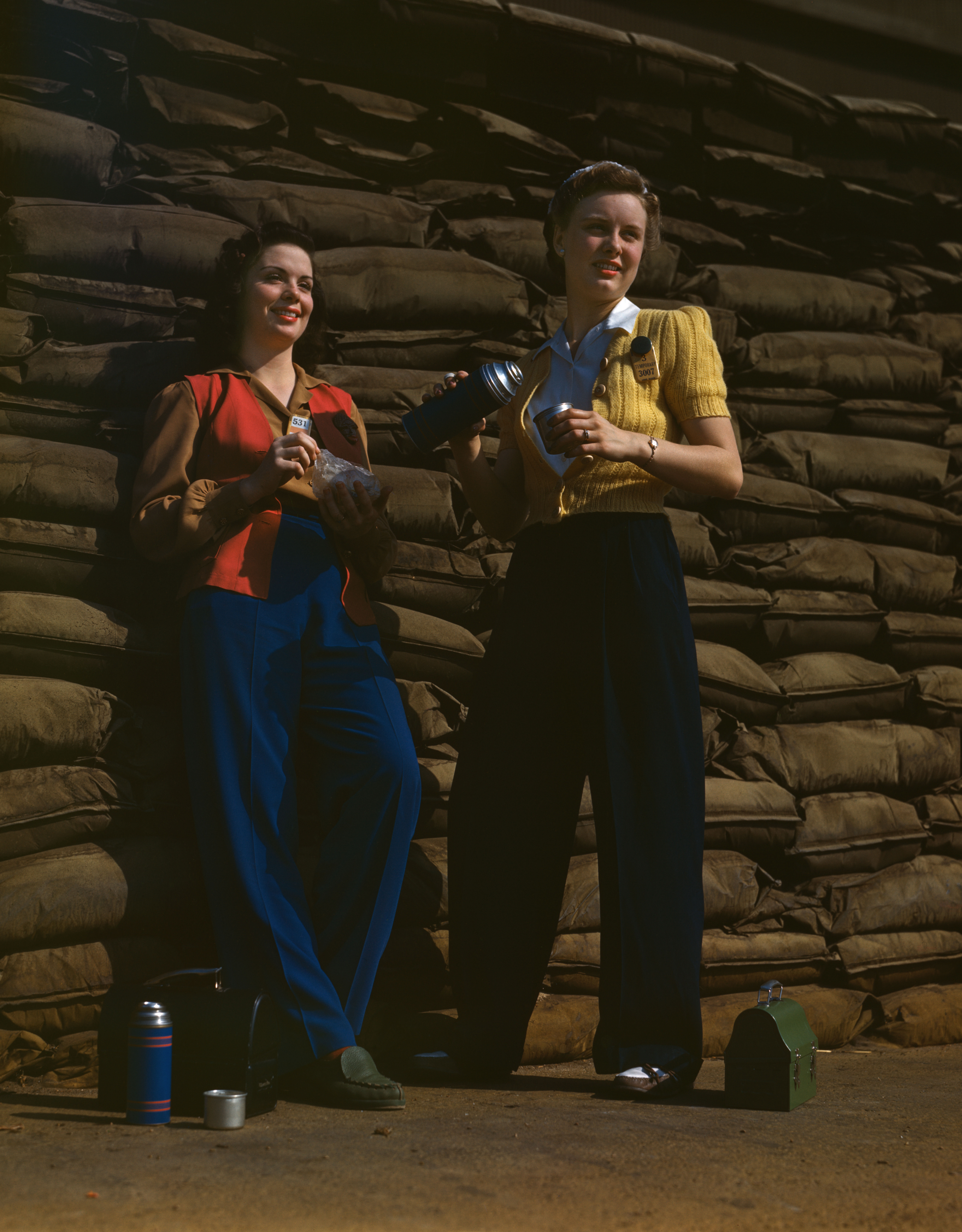
Two women taking a break during their workday

A break at work (or work-break) is a period of time during a shift in which an employee is allowed to take time off from their job. It is a type of downtime. There are different types of breaks, and depending on the length and the employer's policies, the break may or may not be paid.

Meal breaks, tea breaks, coffee breaks, lunch breaks or smoko usually range from ten minutes to one hour. Their purpose is to allow the employee to have a meal that is regularly scheduled during the work day. For a typical daytime job, this is lunch, but this may vary for those with other work hours. Lunch breaks allow an employee's energy to replenish. It is not uncommon for this break to be unpaid, and for the entire work day from start to finish to be longer than the number of hours paid in order to accommodate this time.

== Break laws and regulations ==
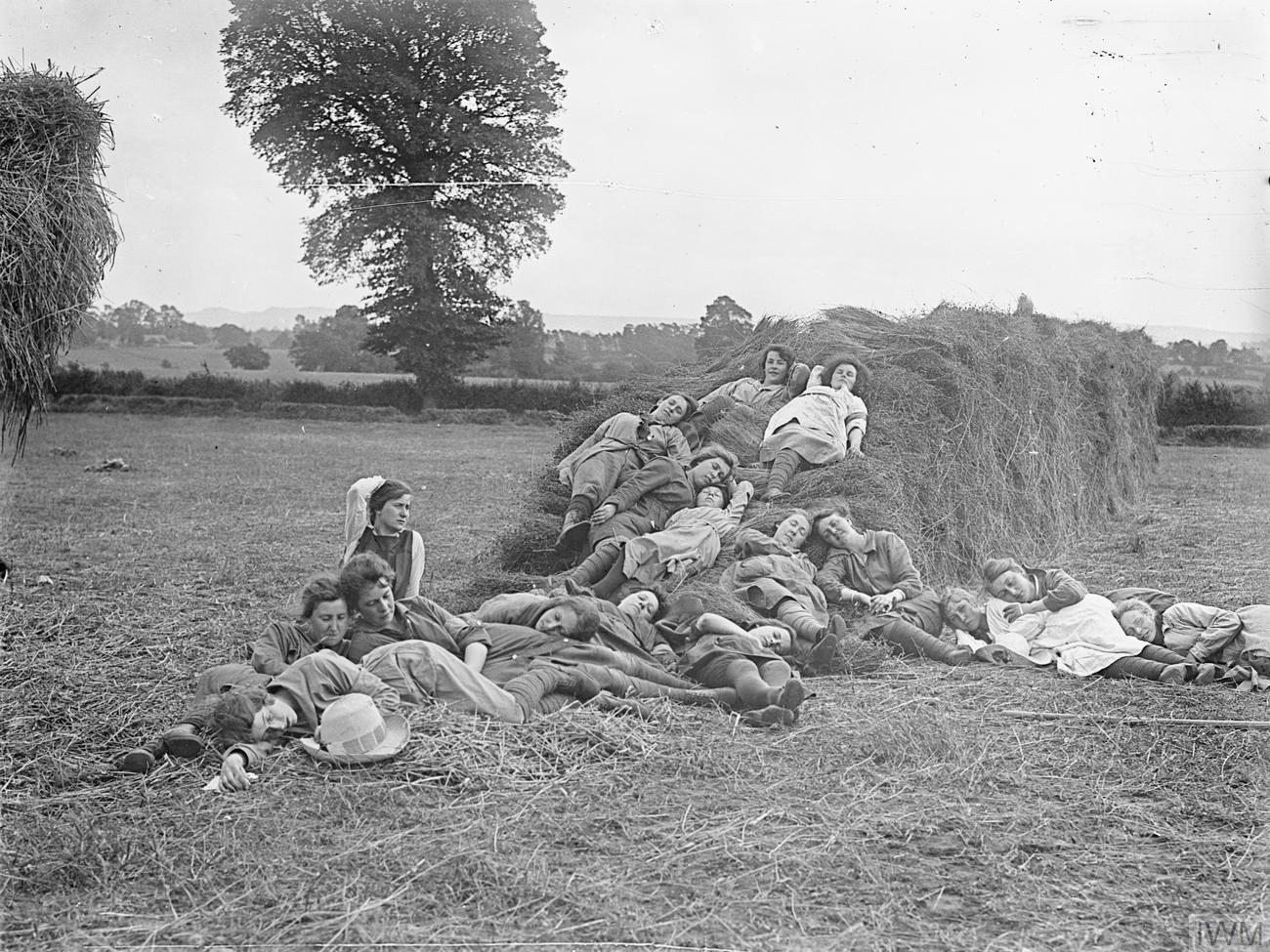
Agricultural workers napping on the flax they harvested

=== Finland ===
In Finland, works breaks are guaranteed by both the Finnish Working Hours Act as well as by collective agreements. Workplaces with collective agreements may differ from the break standards set by the Working Hours Act. Under the Working Hours Act, workers who work for 6 or more hours a day are entitled to a break of 1 hour at minimum. A worker can make an agreement with their employer to take a shorter break, but the break cannot be shorter than 30 minutes. Workers are free to leave their workplaces during their breaks. Workers working for more than 10 hours in a single day must be given a 30-minute break after the first 8 hours.

=== France ===
In France, adult workers are entitled to a 20-minute break for every 6 hours worked. Longer breaks may be established through collective agreements. Workers are permitted to leave their workplaces during their breaks.

=== Japan ===
In Japan, workers are entitled to a 45-minute break for every 6 hours worked and a 1-hour break for every 8 hours worked.

=== Netherlands ===
In the Netherlands, the Working Hours Act grants workers 30 minutes of unpaid break time if they work for over 5.5 hours, which may also be taken in two 15 minute breaks. Workers are granted a 45-minute break if they work for over 10 hours, which may also be taken in 15 minute intervals. Longer breaks may be established through collective agreements.

=== Norway ===
In Norway, workers are entitled to a work break if they work for 5.5 hours. For every 8 hours, a worker is entitled to a 30-minute break. If the workplace does not have a break room, the break must be paid. If a worker works more than 2 hours after their regular hours, they are entitled to a paid 30 minute break.

=== Spain ===
In Spain, workers are entitled to a 15-minute break if their workday exceeds 6 hours. This break is known as pausa del bocadillo (sandwich break) in blue-collar jobs, or pausa del desayuno (breakfast break) in white-collar jobs.

Jobs with office business hours usually offer an additional one-hour break for lunch (so the standard working time is from 9:00 am to 6:00 pm), however, this pause is not paid.

=== Sweden ===
In Sweden, the Working Hours Act grants workers the right to a break every 5 hours. Exceptions to the law are permitted if they are part of a collective agreement approved by an employee organization. Workers are permitted to leave their workplaces during their breaks.

=== United Kingdom ===
In the United Kingdom, under the Working Time Regulations 1998, anyone that works for at least six hours in a day is entitled to a rest break of at least 20 minutes

=== United States ===
Modern break laws in the United States stem from labor laws passed between 1935 and 1974. It was during this time that jobs in the U.S. modernized and the country's desire for these laws sparked. In 1938 the Fair Labor Standards Act was passed. This federal statute was implemented in order to protect employees from abuses that had become commonplace during the Great Depression. During this time it was not unusual for companies to work their employees for long hours without a break and to pay them minuscule wages. When the requirements of the Fair Labor Standards Act were finally set in place in 1945, such abuses were outlawed.

According to a study, the amount of time people are taking for lunch breaks in the United States is shrinking, thereby making the term "lunch hour" a misnomer. Some employers request the lunch to be taken at their work station or do not offer lunch breaks at all. Many employees are taking shorter lunch breaks in order to compete with other employees for a better position, and to show their productivity.

As of 2017, twenty-six states in the United States do not carry break laws in their legislature, such as Texas and Florida. The state of California requires that both meal and rest breaks be given to employees; workers in New York must be given meal breaks, but rest breaks are not required.

In some U.S. states, such as the state of California, meal breaks are legally mandated. Penalties can be severe for failing to adequately staff one's business premises so that all employees can rotate through their mandatory meal and rest breaks. For example, on April 16, 2007, the Supreme Court of California unanimously affirmed a trial court judgment requiring Kenneth Cole Productions to pay an additional hour of pay for each day that a store manager had been forced to work a nine-hour shift without a break. On April 12, 2012, the Supreme Court of California issued its long-awaited opinion in Brinker Restaurant Corp., et al. v. Superior Court., which addressed a number of issues that have been the subject of much litigation in California for many years. The California Supreme court ruled that employers satisfy their California Labor Code section 512 obligation to "provide" meal periods to nonexempt employees by (1) relieving employees of all duty; (2) relinquishing control over their activities and permitting them a reasonable opportunity to take an uninterrupted 30-minute break; and (3) not impeding or discouraging them from doing so. Importantly, the court agreed that employers are not obliged to "police" meal breaks to ensure that no work is performed. Even if an employee chooses to work during a properly provided meal period, an employer will not be liable for any premium pay, and will only be liable to pay for the time worked during a meal period so long as the employer knew or reasonably should have known that the employee was working during the meal period.

== Restroom breaks ==
A short break to allow an employee to use a restroom or WC generally lasts less than 10 minutes. Many employers expect their employees to use the facilities during their regularly scheduled breaks and lunches. Denying employees rights to use the facilities as needed could adversely affect workplace sanitation and workers' health and could create legal issues for both these and other reasons. Employers and co-workers often frown on employees who are seen as taking too many of these breaks, and this could be a cause for progressive discipline from a written warning up to termination. In today's setting, however, restroom breaks are generally accepted and not tracked by employers. In February 2017, an official in Övertorneå Municipality, Sweden proposed an hour-long break for sexual activity.

== Coffee break ==
A coffee break in the United States and elsewhere is a short mid-morning rest period granted to employees in business and industry, corresponding with the Commonwealth terms "elevenses", "smoko" (in Australia and New Zealand), "morning tea", "tea break", or even just "tea". An afternoon coffee break, or afternoon tea, often occurs as well.

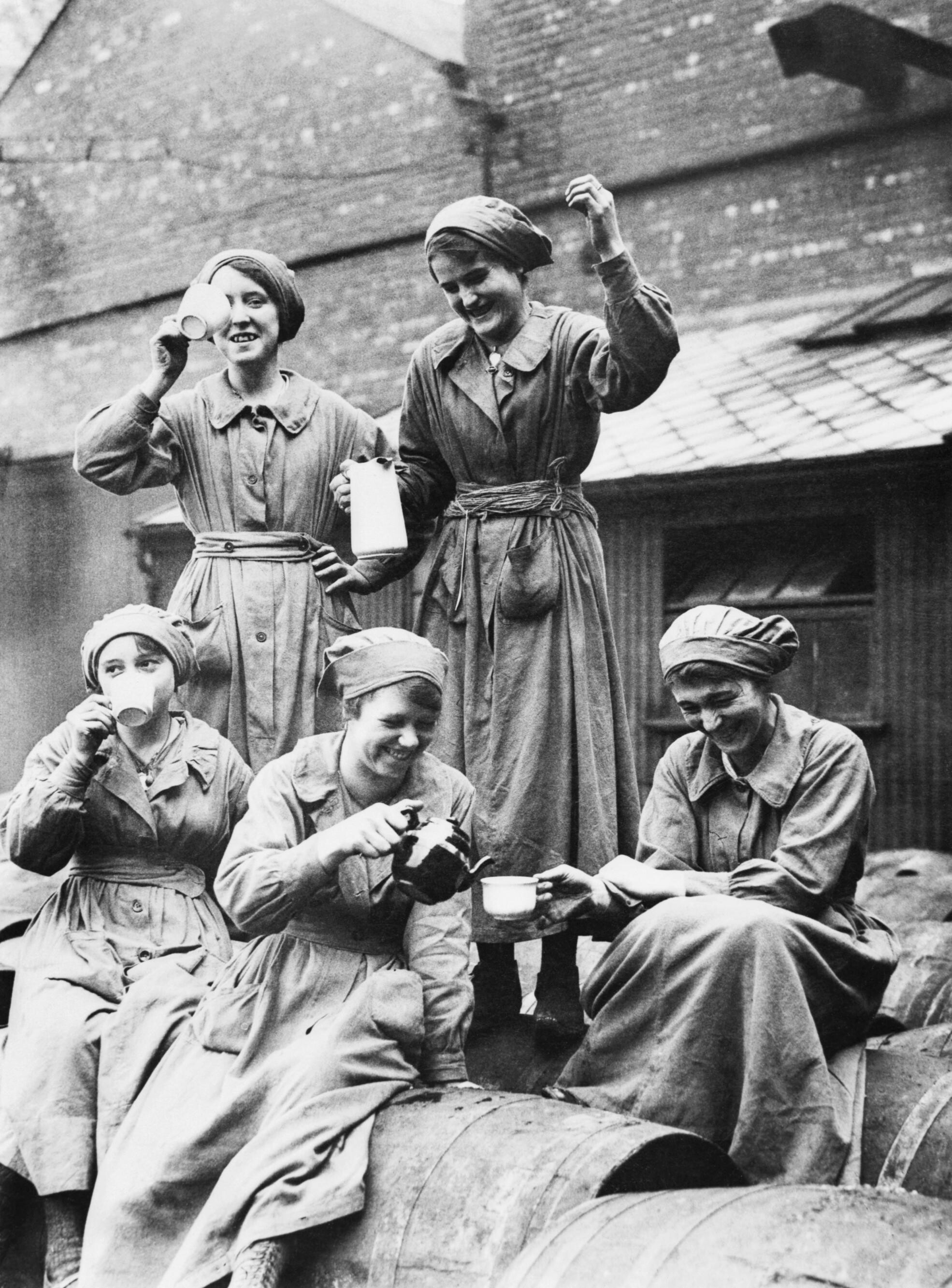
British factory workers in Manchester enjoying a tea break during World War I

The origin of the tea break, as is now incorporated into the law of most countries, stems from research undertaken in England in the early 1900s. A.F. Stanley Kent, an Oxford graduate and the first Professor of Physiology at University College, Bristol, undertook scientific research on industrial fatigue at the request of the Home Office (the interior ministry of the United Kingdom). This work followed the International Congress of Hygiene and Demography held in Brussels in 1903 where a resolution was passed that "the various governments should facilitate as far as possible investigation into the subject of Industrial Fatigue". This was due to its noted bearing on the incidence of accidents and excessive sickness. The monotony of work and the effect of alcohol on muscular activity and mental fatigue were also mentioned. The Tea Break came as a direct result of this work.

When Kent was sent by the Home Secretary to stop wartime munitions production as a trial to test the effect of a tea break on productivity, the factory manager refused on the grounds that he had a production schedule within which he must comply. Meeting this challenge, Kent showed the letter from the Home Secretary and observed that if necessary he would have the police called to arrest the manager who blocked the Home Office directive. The results of Kent's study were presented to both Houses of Parliament on 17 August 1915 in an "Interim Report on Industrial Fatigue by Physiological Methods". It was the first time that the government had owned and operated factories and therefore had the right to intervene in their operational methods. Again presenting to both Houses of Parliament on 16 August 1916, Kent read from his "Blue Book" that during his research it had been "possible to obtain information upon...such [matters] as the need to provide canteens in munitions factories, the question of proper feeding of the factory worker, provision of accommodation in factories for the changing and drying of shoes and clothing, and the proper use of appliances provided for ventilating the work-rooms".

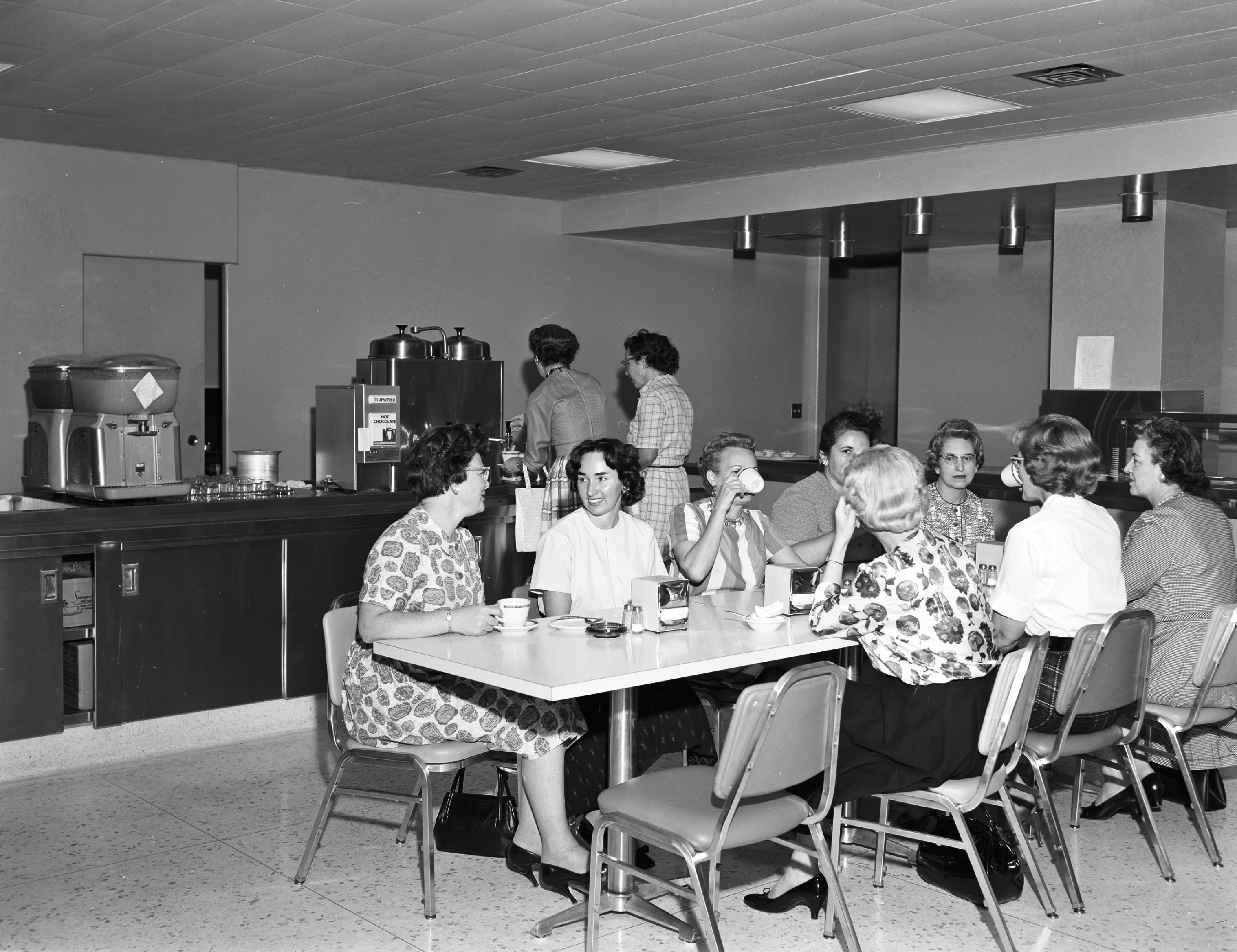
Seattle city employees taking a coffee break in the 1960s

The coffee break allegedly originated in the late 19th century in Stoughton, Wisconsin, with the wives of Norwegian immigrants. The city celebrates this every year with the Stoughton Coffee Break Festival. The first company to officially incorporate the coffee break for workers was either the Larkin Soap Company or the Barcolo Company, both of which were located in Buffalo, NY. It is not clear which was actually first, but they both established the coffee break for employees on a regular basis, both morning and afternoon, by 1902.

In 1951, Time noted that "[s]ince the war, the coffee break has been written into union contracts". The term subsequently became popular through a Pan-American Coffee Bureau ad campaign of 1952 which urged consumers, "Give yourself a Coffee-Break – and Get What Coffee Gives to You." John B. Watson, a behavioral psychologist who worked with Maxwell House later in his career, helped to popularize coffee breaks within the American culture.

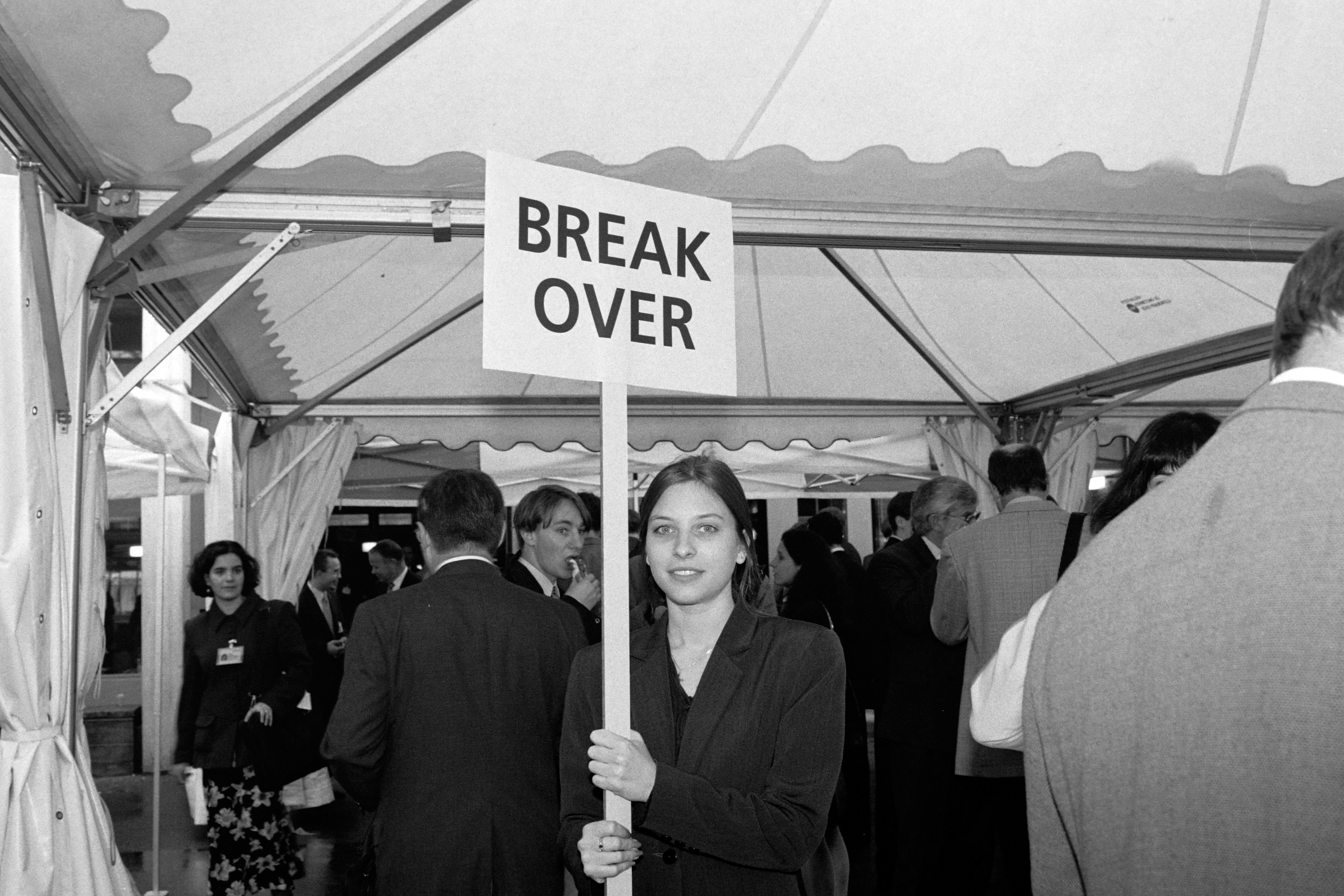
A woman with a "Break over" sign at St. Gallen Symposium, 1996

Coffee breaks usually last from 10 to 20 minutes and frequently occur at the end of the first third of the work shift. In some companies and some civil service, the coffee break may be observed formally at a set hour. In some places, a "cart" with hot and cold beverages and cakes, breads and pastries arrives at the same time morning and afternoon, an employer may contract with an outside caterer for daily service, or coffee breaks may take place away from the actual work-area in a designated cafeteria or tea room.

More generally, the phrase "coffee break" has also come to denote any break from work.

== Snack breaks ==
Snack breaks are usually shorter than meal breaks, and allow an employee to have a quick snack, or to accomplish other personal needs. Similar types of breaks include restroom and smoke breaks but "snack break" is standard US nomenclature for such breaks. These breaks are also required in the state of California; one 10–15-minute break for every 3.5 hours worked. A few other US states have similar laws, but most do not. Some employers allow employees to stop their work for short durations at any time to take care of these needs.

== Smoking breaks ==
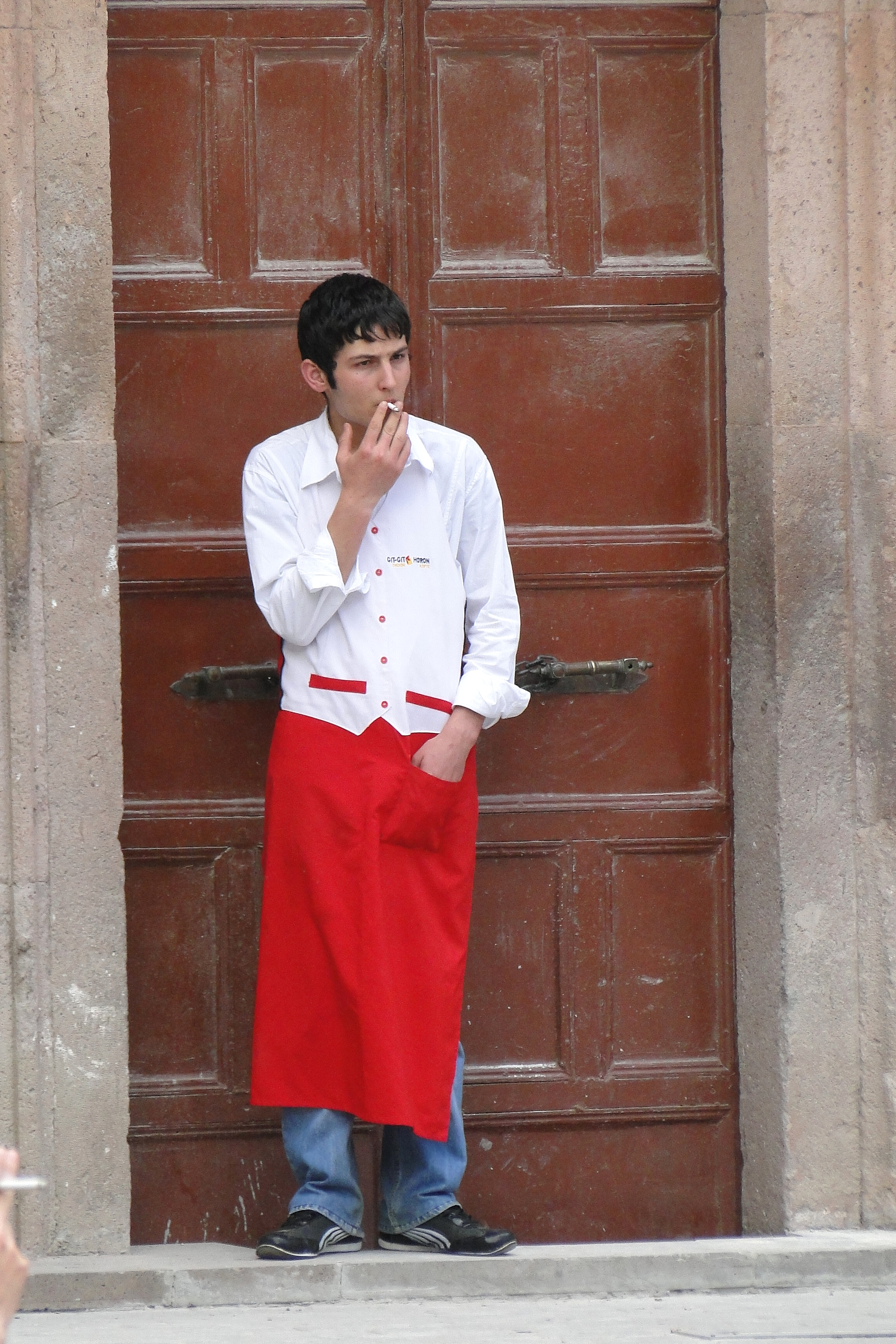
A waiter in Turkey taking a smoke break outside of his workplace

Many companies in the 21st century do not allow smoking on their property, although some employers allow workers to leave the premises to smoke, and some jurisdictions have laws prohibiting smoking in an enclosed place where others are employed. Smoke (also known as "smoko", "fag" or "cigarette") breaks can be of different lengths but, for the most part, are shorter than lunch breaks. Some employers are very strict about smoking. A criticism of smoking breaks is that non-smoking employees do not receive the small respite because they simply do not smoke. In some working environments, however, smoking breaks are widely accepted and seen by some as a good way to network with colleagues.

Many employers do not provide smoking breaks as such in the 21st century for staff, irrespective of whether they smoke or not, but many simply offer minimum breaks for shorter shifts and it is personal choice whether the employee goes outside to smoke in this short time frame or not.

Some employers may even provide outside designated areas for staff who wish to smoke, often their smoking policy includes usage of e-cigarettes.

== See also ==
- Break room
- Smoko
- Booster breaks in the workplace
- Builder's tea, a type of strong tea in a mug associated with work breaks
- Fika (coffee break)
- Right to sit
- Tea lady
- Workplace strategy
