= National Centre for Partnership and Performance =

The National Centre for Partnership and Performance (NCPP), based in Dublin, Ireland, was an Irish government agency that was established in 2001 to promote and facilitate workplace change and innovation through partnership. The NCPP's goal was to contribute to national competitiveness, improved workplace productivity and performance, and a better Quality of working life for employers and employees alike. It combined research and advocacy to achieve these aims.

On 1 January 2007, the NCPP was placed on a statutory footing as part of the new National Economic and Social Development Office (NESDO). NESDO’s other constituent bodies are the National Economic and Social Council (NESC) and the National Economic and Social Forum (NESF).

The NCPP was dissolved in 2010.

== National Workplace Strategy ==
One of the NCPP's main tasks was to promote the National Workplace Strategy (NWS), the government's blueprint to transform Irish workplaces into 'workplaces of the future'.

Under Taoiseach Bertie Ahern, TD, the NWS was adopted in March 2005, following a two-year Forum on the Workplace of the Future. The Forum brought together employers, trade unions, academics, government departments, state agencies and the community/voluntary sector to set out a vision of the workplace of the future. According to them, such a workplace would be: agile; customer centred; knowledge intensive; responsive to employee needs; networked; highly productive; involved and participatory; continually learning, and proactively diverse.

In June 2007, the NCPP launched a national public awareness campaign to promote the aims and objectives of the National Workplace Strategy, including a revamped NWS website . By September 2007, the new site had received more than 10,000 hits following an extensive advertising campaign across TV, radio, internet and outdoor.

== Governance ==
The NCPP was chaired by Peter Cassells, former General Secretary of the Irish Congress of Trade Unions (ICTU). Its Director was Lucy Fallon-Byrne. The board of the NCPP included representatives of the social partners (IBEC, ICTU, CIF), government departments and state agencies.
