= Shearing layers =

Systems theory concept

Shearing layers is a concept coined by architect Frank Duffy, which was later elaborated by Stewart Brand in his book, How Buildings Learn: What Happens After They're Built (Brand, 1994), and refers to buildings as composed of several layers of change. The concept has been adopted by a number of technology vendors to also describe the different layers of systems within an organisation.

== Description ==
The shearing layers concept views buildings as a set of components that evolve in different timescales; Frank Duffy summarized this view in his phrase: "Our basic argument is that there isn't any such thing as a building. A building properly conceived is several layers of longevity of built components" (quoted in (Brand, 1994)).

The work of Duffy and DEGW identified four shearing layers (Duffy, 1992):

- Shell – the traditional structure of the building that might last for 30–50 years.
- Services – cabling, plumbing, aircon that needs replacing every 15 years.
- Scenery – layout of partitions and dropped ceiling that last 5 years.
- Set – the layout of furniture that might change every few months, weeks, or even more frequently.

Brand expanded this list to six elements (Brand, 1994):

Site
This is the geographical setting, the urban location, and the legally defined lot, whose boundaries and context outlast generations of ephemeral buildings. "Site is eternal." Duffy agrees.
Structure
The foundation and load-bearing elements are perilous and expensive to change, so people don't. These are the building. Structural life ranges from thirty to three hundred years (but few buildings make it past sixty for other reasons).
Skin
Exterior surfaces now change every twenty years or so, to keep up with fashion or technology, or for wholesale repair. Recent focus on energy costs has led to re-engineered skins that are air-tight and better-insulated.
Services
These are the working guts of a building: communications wiring, electrical wiring, plumbing, fire sprinkler systems, HVAC (heating, ventilating, and air conditioning), and moving parts like elevators and escalators. They wear out or obsolesce every seven to fifteen years. Many buildings are demolished early if their outdated systems are too deeply embedded to replace easily.
Space Plan
The interior layout—where walls, ceilings, floors, and doors go. Turbulent commercial space can change every three years or so; exceptionally quiet homes might wait thirty years.
Stuff
Chairs, desks, phones, pictures; kitchen appliances, lamps, hairbrushes; all the things that twitch around daily to monthly. Furniture is called mobile in Italian for good reason.

== Theory ==
The concept is based on the work of ecologists (O'Neill et al., 1985) and systems theorists (Salthe, 1993). The idea is that there are processes in nature, which operate in different timescales and as a result there is little or no exchange of energy/mass/information between them. Brand transferred this intuition to buildings and noticed that traditional buildings were able to adapt because they allowed "slippage" of layers: i.e. faster layers (services) were not obstructed by slower ones (structure).

The concept of shearing layers leads to an architectural design principle, known as pace-layering, which arranges the layers to allow for maximum adaptability. This term is introduced in (Brand 1999).

== Variations ==
The technology advisory firm Gartner uses the term pace layering in its variation of the shearing layer concept. They describe how within organisations there are different layers of software applications. Applications which need to adapt and change at different speeds. They refer to these layers as Systems of Record, Systems of Differentiation and Systems of Innovation. Their proposition is that firms need to look at how these application layers are governed, managed, sourced, maintained and interact to enable companies to better adapt and react to changing business requirements. Gartner have trade marked this variant/adaptation of pace layering in connection with how companies should manage their application portfolio, referring to it as the PACE layered application strategy (trademark).

== Application ==
The shearing layers concept has been applied to other man-made artifacts such as software (Simmonds et al., 2000; Papantoniou et al., 2003) or the web (Campbell & Fast, 2006).

== See also ==
- Pace layers
- Level of organization
- Pattern language
