= Booster Breaks =

2010 book by Wendell C. Taylor

Booster Breaks: Improving Employee Health One Break at a Time
- Authors: Wendell C. Taylor, PhD, MPH, Karen L. Pepkin, MA
- Language: English
- Published: 2010 (Karrick Press)
- Publication place: United States
- Media type: Print (paperback)
- Pages: 122
- ISBN: 978-0-578-05975-4

Booster Breaks: Improving Employee Health One Break at a Time is a 2010 book. Booster breaks are defined as: "organized, routine work breaks intended to improve physical and psychological health, enhance job satisfaction, and sustain or increase work productivity." Dr. Wendell C. Taylor is recognized as the architect of the Booster Break concept. The intent of Booster Breaks is to encourage health-enhancing breaks during the work day as a corrective to job stress and sedentary behavior. Examples of Booster Breaks are physical activity (e.g., a brief sequence of stretching and toning movements), meditation, or breath training. Even for brief sessions of 10 to 15 minutes, a routine practice of any of the preceding examples can produce physical, psychological, and/or mental benefits.

One objective of Booster Breaks is to transform work place culture so that management supports and encourages Booster Breaks during the work day and that groups of co-workers regularly participate in Booster Break sessions to promote enjoyment, social support, and team building. In many work places, the usual 10- to 15-minute work breaks in the morning and afternoon can be organized as Booster Breaks to enable a regular practice of a health-promoting behavior at the work place in work clothes during the work day. Ideally, each company would have facilitators, company employees trained to lead the activity, who guide each session.

== Booster Break Ripple Effects Model ==
A Booster Break program can transform workplace policies to improve organizational morale and lower health care costs with favorable ripple effects for society. To illustrate the impact of the Booster Break program, the Booster Break Ripple Effects Model was developed and has six levels: Booster Break practices, health effects, organizational morale, productivity, health care costs, and organizational image. The first level provides examples of Booster Break behaviors (e.g., physical activity, meditation, and breath training). The second level presents the immediate proximal effects of Booster Break practices (e.g., improved health, reduced stress, increased energy, and fun). The third level, organizational morale, is a proximal effect of the second level related to practice and policy. The fourth, fifth, and sixth levels are increasingly distal but substantial effects of Booster Break practices and policies (i.e., increased productivity, decreased health care costs, and improved organizational image). The first waves of the ripple effects are the strongest, and each successive wave is less robust than the previous waves. The levels are interconnected and synergistic. The strength and robustness of each level affects the impact of each successive level. For example, frequent Booster Break practices by a greater number of employees will yield greater health care savings. Recent research provided scientific support for the first three levels of the Booster Break Ripple Effects Model. The full impact of the Model is being studied.

== See also ==
- Break (work)
- Workplace health promotion
- Workplace wellness
- Positive psychology in the workplace
