= Frank Duffy (architect) =

British architect (1940–2026)

Francis Cuthbert Duffy CBE FRIBA (3 September 1940 – 21 February 2026) was a British architect, a founder of DEGW, the international architectural and design practice best known for office design and workplace strategy and, later for advanced thinking on the programming of educational and arts facilities. Duffy is particularly noted for his work on the future of the office and the flexible use of space.

== Life and career ==
Duffy was born in Berwick-upon-Tweed, England on 3 September 1940. He was president of the RIBA from 1993 to 1995. He was appointed a Commander of the Order of the British Empire in the New Year Honours 1997. In 2004, he received the British Council of Offices (BCO) President's Award for Lifetime Achievement and in 2008 was named by Facilities Magazine as one of 25 Pioneers of Facilities Management in the UK. He was later on the Board of Trustees of The Architecture Foundation.

In the 1960s, Duffy was responsible for introducing Bürolandschaft (office landscaping) into the English-speaking world. His doctoral research at Princeton was focused on the mapping the relationship between organisational structure and office layouts. In the 1970s, he was one of the pioneers who introduced North American practice in Space Planning and Facility management into Europe. He coined the concept of "Shell, Services, Scenery and Sets"(or Shearing layers), the analysis of buildings and building components in terms of layers of longevity to facilitate the accommodation of technological and organisational change. This concept was later elaborated by Stewart Brand in his book How Buildings Learn: What Happens After They're Built (Brand, 1994). In the 1980s Duffy and his DEGW colleagues initiated the ORBIT (Office Research: Buildings and Information Technology) into the impact on office design of advances in Information Technology. This research had a substantial impact initially on key British office projects such as Broadgate and Stockley Park and then on office design worldwide. More recently Duffy's interests have focused on the challenges that increasing reliance on virtual communications is bringing into urban design – asking the question, "In an increasingly virtual world what arguments can architects and urbanists use to justify spaces and places?"

National Life Stories conducted an oral history interview (C467/103) with Francis Duffy in 2013 for its Architects Lives' collection held by the British Library.

Duffy was editor of the Architectural Association Journal (1965–67) and of Facilities (1982–90).

As a consultant specialising in Workplace Strategy for almost 40 years, Duffy worked internationally for a wide variety of corporate and government clients. DEGW now has offices in the UK, the US, France, Germany, the Netherlands, Spain, Italy, Singapore and Australia.

Duffy died on 21 February 2026, at the age of 85.

== Works ==
1. "Burolandschaft", Architectural Review (February 1964)
2. "Some notes on Archigram", House & Garden 129 (February 1966) p. 171–172
3. Office Landscaping, Anbar Publications (1966), also published in Sweden as Kontolandsskap (1967)
4. "Work, Organization, Behavior, and Office Buildings: Some Proposals for Analysis and Design." Thesis (Master of Architecture), University of California, Berkeley (September 1969)
5. "Office Interiors and Organizations" Dissertation (PhD), Princeton University (1974)
6. Planning Office Space, Architectural Press, (1976), also published in Spain as Officinas (1976)
7. "Office Buildings and Organisational Change", Anthony King, Buildings and Society (1980)
8. The ORBIT Study, Information Technology and Office Design (1983)
9. The Changing City, Bulstrode Press (1989) with Alex Henney
10. The Changing Workplace, Phaidon (1992) with Patrick Hannay
11. The Responsible Workplace, Butterworth Architecture (1993) with Andrew Laing and Vic Crisp
12. The New Office, Conran Octopus (1997) with Kenneth Powell
13. "The New Office." Facilities Design and Management (12 October 1998)
14. Laing, Andrew; Jaunzens, Denice; Willis, Steve (1998). New Environments for Working. Construction Research Publications. Archived from the original on 26 October 2012 – via Questia.
15. Architectural Knowledge: The Idea of a Profession. E & FN Spon. 1998. Archived from the original on 18 October 2012 – via Questia.
16. Design for Change: The Architecture of DEGW, Birkhauser (1998) also published in German as Flexible Gebaude
17. Work and the City, Black Dog Publishing (2008)
