= Quality of working life =

Broad employment-related experience

Quality of working life (QWL) describes a person's broader employment-related experience. Various authors and researchers have proposed models of quality of working life – also referred to as quality of worklife – which include a wide range of factors, sometimes classified as "motivator factors" which if present can make the job experience a positive one, and "hygiene factors" which if lacking are more associated with dissatisfaction. A number of rating scales have been developed aiming to measure overall quality of working life or certain aspects thereof. Some publications have drawn attention to the importance of QWL for both employees and employers, and also for national economic performance.

== Models and components ==
=== Hackman and Oldham (1976) ===
Hackman and Oldham (1976) drew attention to what they described as psychological growth needs as relevant to the consideration of quality of working life. Several such needs were identified :

- skill variety
- task identity
- task significance
- autonomy
- feedback

They suggested that such needs have to be addressed if employees are to experience high quality of working life.

=== Taylor (1979) ===
In contrast to such theory-based models, Cooper & Mumford (1979) more pragmatically identified the essential components of quality of working life as basic extrinsic job factors of wages, hours, and working conditions, and the intrinsic job notions of the nature of the work itself. They suggested that several other aspects could be added, including:

- individual power
- employee participation in the management
- fairness and equity
- social support
- use of one's present skills
- self-development
- a meaningful future at work
- social relevance of the work or product
- effect on extra work activities

Cooper & Mumford suggested that relevant quality of working life concepts may vary according to organisation and employee group.

=== Warr et al. (1979) ===
Warr and colleagues (1979), in an investigation of quality of working life, considered a range of apparently relevant factors, including:

- work involvement
- intrinsic job motivation
- higher order need strength
- perceived intrinsic job characteristics
- job satisfaction
- life satisfaction
- happiness
- self-rated anxiety

They discussed a range of correlations derived from their work, such as those between work involvement and job satisfaction, intrinsic job motivation and job satisfaction, and perceived intrinsic job characteristics and job satisfaction. In particular, Warr et al. found evidence for a moderate association between total job satisfaction and total life satisfaction and happiness, with a less strong, but significant association with self-rated anxiety.

Thus, whilst some authors have emphasised the workplace aspects in quality of working life, others have identified the relevance of personality factors, psychological well-being, and broader concepts of happiness and life satisfaction.

Factors more obviously and directly affecting work have, however, served as the main focus of attention, as researchers have tried to tease out the important influences on quality of working life in the workplace.

=== Mirvis and Lawler (1984) ===
Mirvis and Lawler (1984) suggested that quality of working life was associated with satisfaction with wages, hours and working conditions, describing the "basic elements of a good quality of work life" as:

- safe work environment
- equitable wages
- equal employment opportunities
- opportunities for advancement
- opportunities to learn and grow
- protection of individual rights

=== Baba and Jamal (1991) ===
Baba and Jamal (1991) listed what they described as typical indicators of quality of working life, including:

- job satisfaction
- job involvement
- work role ambiguity
- work role conflict
- work role overload
- job stress
- organisational commitment
- turn-over intentions

Baba and Jamal also explored routinisation of job content, suggesting that this facet should be investigated as part of the concept of quality of working life.

=== Ellis and Pompli (2002) ===
Some have argued that quality of working life might vary between groups of workers. For example, Ellis and Pompli (2002) identified a number of factors contributing to job dissatisfaction and quality of working life in nurses, including:

- poor working environments
- resident aggression
- workload, inability to deliver quality of care preferred
- balance of work and family
- shiftwork
- lack of involvement in decision making
- professional isolation
- lack of recognition
- poor relationships with supervisor/peers
- role conflict
- lack of opportunity to learn new skills

=== Sirgy et al. (2001) ===
Sirgy et al. (2001) suggested the quality of working life as a second-order factor with seven first-order dimensions:

- health and safety needs
- economic and family needs
- social needs
- esteem needs
- actualization needs
- knowledge needs
- aesthetic needs

They defined quality of working life as satisfaction of these key needs through resources, activities, and outcomes stemming from participation in the workplace. Needs as defined by the psychologist, Abraham Maslow, were seen as relevant in underpinning this model, covering health & safety, economic and family, social, esteem, actualization, knowledge and aesthetics, although the relevance of non-work aspects is played down as attention is focussed on quality of work life rather than the broader concept of quality of life. The proposed measure by Sirgy et al. (2001) suggests that quality of working life involves lower-order (social needs; esteem needs; actualization needs; knowledge needs; and, aesthetic needs) and higher-order needs (health and safety needs; and, economic and family needs). This measure is adapted to more than ten different countries, namely Portugal and Brazil (presenting good validity evidence based on the internal structure and based on the relation to other variables).

These attempts at defining quality of working life have included theoretical approaches, lists of identified factors, correlational analyses, with opinions varying as to whether such definitions and explanations can be both global, or need to be specific to each work setting.

=== Bearfield (2003) ===
Bearfield (2003) used 16 questions to examine quality of working life, and distinguished between causes of dissatisfaction in professionals, intermediate clerical, sales and service workers, indicating that different concerns might have to be addressed for different groups.

=== Herzberg et al. (1959) ===
The distinction made between job satisfaction and dissatisfaction in quality of working life reflects the influence of job satisfaction theories. Herzberg et al., (1959) used "Hygiene factors" and "Motivator factors" to distinguish between the separate causes of job satisfaction and job dissatisfaction. It has been suggested that Motivator factors are intrinsic to the job, that is; job content, the work itself, responsibility and advancement. The Hygiene factors or dissatisfaction-avoidance factors include aspects of the job environment such as interpersonal relationships, salary, working conditions and security. Of these latter, the most common cause of job dissatisfaction can be company policy and administration, whilst achievement can be the greatest source of extreme satisfaction.

=== Nanjundeswaraswamy and Swamy (2013) ===
Nanjundeswaraswamy and Swamy (2013) used nine components to measure quality of worklife of employees in private technical institutions:

- work environment
- organization culture and climate
- relation and co-operation
- training and development
- compensation and rewards
- facilities
- job satisfaction and job security
- autonomy of work
- adequacy of resources

Male employees are more satisfied than female employees the chi square test confirms that all the demographic factors like gender, designation, salary, department, experience are independent of quality of worklife of employees in private technical institution. Study also reveals that there is a significant association between QWL of Teaching and Non teaching staffs. From the correlation analysis it is find that Adequacy of Resources are more correlated and Training & Development are less correlated with teaching staffs perception towards quality of worklife and in case of non teaching staffs Compensation & Rewards are more correlated and Work Environment are less correlated with QWL.

=== Lawler and Porter (1966) ===
An individual's experience of satisfaction or dissatisfaction can be substantially rooted in their perception, rather than simply reflecting their "real world". Further, an individual's perception can be affected by relative comparison – am I paid as much as that person – and comparisons of internalised ideals, aspirations, and expectations, for example, with the individual's current state (Lawler and Porter, 1966).

=== Discussion ===
In summary, where it has been considered, authors differ in their views on the core constituents of quality of working life.

It has generally been agreed however that quality of working life is conceptually similar to well-being of employees but differs from job satisfaction which solely represents the workplace domain.

Quality of working life is not a unitary concept, but has been seen as incorporating a hierarchy of perspectives that not only include work-based factors such as job satisfaction, satisfaction with pay and relationships with colleagues, but also factors that broadly reflect life satisfaction and general feelings of well-being. More recently, work-related stress and the relationship between work and non-work life domains have also been identified as factors that should conceptually be included in quality of working life.

== Measurement ==
There are few recognised measures of quality of working life, and of those that exist, few have evidence of validity and reliability, although both the Brief Index of Affective Job Satisfaction and the Quality of Work Life Scale have been systematically developed to be reliable and is rigorously psychometrically validated.

The Brief Index of Affective Job Satisfaction (BIAFJS) is a 4-item, purely affective as opposed to cognitive, measure of overall affective job satisfaction that reflects quality of working life. The BIAJS differs from other job satisfaction measures in being comprehensively validated not just for internal consistency reliability, temporal stability, convergent and criterion-related validities, but also for cross-population invariance by nationality, job level, and job type. Reported internal consistency reliabilities range between .81 and .87.

Statistical analysis of the Work-Related Quality of Life scale (WRQoL), provides support for the psychometric structure of this instrument. The WRQoWL measure uses six core factors to explain most of the variation in an individual's quality of working life: Job and Career Satisfaction; Working Conditions; General Well-Being; Home-Work Interface; Stress at Work and Control at Work.

The Job & Career Satisfaction (JCS) scale of the Work-Related Quality of Life scale (WRQoL) is said to reflect an employee's feelings about, or evaluation of, their satisfaction or contentment with their job and career and the training they receive to do it. Within the WRQoL measure, JCS is reflected by questions asking how satisfied people feel about their work. It has been proposed that this Positive Job Satisfaction factor is influenced by various issues including clarity of goals and role ambiguity, appraisal, recognition and reward, personal development career benefits and enhancement and training needs.

The General well-being (GWB) scale of the Work-Related Quality of Life scale (WRQoL), aims to assess the extent to which an individual feels good or content in themselves, in a way which may be independent of their work situation. It is suggested that general well-being both influences, and is influenced by work. Mental health problems, predominantly depression and anxiety disorders, are common, and may have a major impact on the general well-being of the population. The WRQoL GWB factor assesses issues of mood, depression and anxiety, life satisfaction, general quality of life, optimism and happiness.

The WRQoL Stress at Work sub-scale (SAW) reflects the extent to which an individual perceives they have excessive pressures, and feel stressed at work. The WRQoL SAW factor is assessed through items dealing with demand and perception of stress and actual demand overload. Whilst it is possible to be pressured at work and not be stressed at work, in general, high stress is associated with high pressure.

The Control at Work (CAW) subscale of the WRQoL scale addresses how much employees feel they can control their work through the freedom to express their opinions and being involved in decisions at work. Perceived control at work as measured by the Work-Related Quality of Life scale (WRQoL) is recognized as a central concept in the understanding of relationships between stressful experiences, behaviour and health. Control at work, within the theoretical model underpinning the WRQoL, is influenced by issues of communication at work, decision making and decision control.

The WRQoL Home-Work Interface scale (HWI) measures the extent to which an employer is perceived to support the family and home life of employees. This factor explores the interrelationship between home and work life domains. Issues that appear to influence employee HWI include adequate facilities at work, flexible working hours and the understanding of managers.

The Working Conditions scale of the WRQoL assesses the extent to which the employee is satisfied with the fundamental resources, working conditions and security necessary to do their job effectively. Physical working conditions influence employee health and safety and thus employee Quality of working life. This scale also taps into satisfaction with the resources provided to help people do their jobs.

== Applications ==
Regular assessment of quality of working life can potentially provide organisations with important information about the welfare of their employees, such as job satisfaction, general well-being, work-related stress and the home-work interface. Studies in the UK University sector have shown a valid measure of quality of working life exists and can be used as a basis for effective interventions.

Worrall and Cooper (2006) reported that a low level of well-being at work is estimated to cost about 5-10% of gross national product per annum, yet quality of working life as a theoretical construct remains relatively unexplored and unexplained within the organisational psychology research literature.

A publication of the National Institute for Clinical Excellence (NICE) emphasises the core role of assessment and understanding of the way working environments pose risks for psychological wellbeing through lack of control and excessive demand. The emphasis placed by NICE on assessment and monitoring wellbeing springs from the fact that these processes are the key first step in identifying areas for improving quality of working life and addressing risks at work.

== See also ==
- Quality of life
- Happiness at work
- Workplace wellness
- Workplace health promotion
