= Workplace health promotion =

Efforts to improve the mental and physical well-being of workers

Workplace health promotion is the combined efforts of employers, employees, and society to improve the mental and physical health and well-being of people at work. The term workplace health promotion denotes a comprehensive analysis and design of human and organizational work levels with the strategic aim of developing and improving health resources in an enterprise. The World Health Organization has prioritized the workplace as a setting for health promotion because of the large potential audience and influence on all spheres of a person's life. The Luxembourg Declaration provides that health and well-being of employees at work can be achieved through a combination of:

- Improving the organization and the working environment
- Promoting active participation
- Encouraging personal development.

Workplace health promotion combines alleviation of health risk factors with enhancement of health strengthening factors and seeks to further develop protection factors and health potentials. Workplace health promotion is complementary to the discipline of occupational safety and health, which consists of protecting workers from hazards. Successful workplace health promotion strategies include the principles of participation, project management, integration, and comprehensiveness:

- Participation: all staff must be included in all program stages
- Project management: programs must be oriented toward the problem-solving cycle
- Integration: programs must be incorporated into company management practices and workplace health-promotion strategies should influence corporate planning
- Comprehensiveness: programs must incorporate interdisciplinary individual-directed and environment-directed health strategies.

A report by the European Agency for Safety and Health at Work notes growing evidence that significant cost savings can be made by implementing workplace health promotion strategies, and over 90% of United States workplaces with greater than 50 employees have health promotion programs in place.

== Strategies to promote health in the workplace ==
A National Institute for Occupational Safety and Health video on creating an organizational culture of health in the workplace

Strategies for workplace health promotion need to be inclusive to account for diversity in the workforce, and behavioral economics is a key tool for implementing workplace health programs. The United States Department of Health and Human Services includes five strategic guidelines for workplace health promotion in its Healthy People 2010 initiative. These include:

- Health education, focused on skill development and lifestyle behavior change along with information dissemination and awareness building.
- Supportive social and physical environments, reflecting the organization's expectations regarding health behaviors and implementing policies promoting healthy behaviors.
- Integration of the worksite program into the organization's benefits, human resources infrastructure, and environmental health and safety initiatives.
- Links between health promotion and related programs like employee assistance.
- Screenings followed by counseling and education on how to best use medical services for necessary follow-up.

More generally, workplace health promotion efforts are implemented at three functional levels, including:

- Level I: awareness programs such as newsletters, health fairs, and educational classes that may or may not directly improve individual health or influence behavioral change.
- Level II: lifestyle modification programs of 8 to 12 weeks duration that are available to employees on an ongoing basis and directly influence health outcomes.
- Level III: the creation of a work environment that assists employees in sustaining healthy lifestyles and behaviors, such as workplace cafeterias offering healthy food choices or the provision of workplace exercise facilities.

In most instances physical activity interventions conform to Level II of this framework and may also include elements from Level III. Incentive-based Fitness Rewards Programs (FRPs) aim to influence employee behaviors and thereby conform to Level I.

== Physical activity interventions ==
Approximately half of all current workplace health promotion programs are based on physical activity interventions given the relative ease by which employers can advocate such efforts to employees. Employer-sponsored activity interventions in the form of team sports originated as early as the 17th century in the United Kingdom, however, most 21st century interventions rely on employer sponsorship of employee access to health and fitness facilities. Employee convenience to sponsored fitness facilities strongly influences program participation, and facilities located near employee locations of residence hold lower time costs, receive increased use, and yield better program and health outcomes. Women frequently demonstrate lower participation in workplace exercise programs than men, and young, single individuals are often more predisposed to pursue employer-sponsored physical activity initiatives. In many cases, exercise-based workplace health promotion programs struggle to attract those who would benefit the most from such fitness efforts, including aging, sedentary, blue-collar, female, or less-educated employees.

The sedentary nature of many modern workplaces increases negative metabolic risk factors such as high body mass index (BMI), waist circumference, and blood pressure and elevated fasting glucose and triglyceride levels. Breaking up long periods of sedentary time is shown to improve these risks. Specifically, utilization of portable pedal exercise machines in office environments has been shown to improve employee health, and use was demonstrated feasible during working hours. Interventions using pedometers to influence employee behavior, decrease the duration of sedentary periods, and increase total movement during the work day have also proven successful. Smartphone applications and workplace signs promoting stair use are known to improve employee health, and many employers are now investing in wearable technologies to encourage employees to monitor physical activity. Workplace Tai Chi programs have also proven effective as a health intervention and means of reducing absenteeism, particularly in older workers. Despite these efforts, many health promotion programs struggle with poor participation, and the introduction of incentives is shown to improve employee involvement.

== Incentive-based programs ==
To encourage physical activity among the workforce, many employers offer financial incentives to employees through Fitness Rewards Programs (FRPs). Seeing that exercise and dieting produce immediate discomfort, the benefits of weight loss are often not noticeable in the short-term, and many people seek long-term health but succumb to near-term temptations of unhealthy eating and inactivity (hyperbolic discounting), maintaining employee involvement in wellness programs is difficult. To solve these problems of immediacy, salience, and hyperbolic discounting FRPs offer financial incentives to employees for healthy behaviors. Though lack of participation remains a problem even among well crafted FRPs, attrition is not random and greater weight loss success is associated with a reduction in later program dropout probability.

== Effects of workplace health promotion ==
The positive impact of workplace health promotion programs on productivity is widely discussed. The impact of workplace health promotion on absenteeism is substantial since productivity is impossible if an employee is absent. However, the effects of presenteeism are also significant, and working while sick is estimated to cost the United States economy more than $150 billion per year. Absenteeism is estimated to cost the average employer $660 annually per employee. Based on productivity costs, employees experiencing negative health conditions or at risk of developing impaired health cost employers up to $1601 more than healthy employees per year. Improvements in productivity and absenteeism following implementation of workplace health promotion programs can annually save employers $15.6 for every one dollar spent on health initiatives. More generally, employee health care costs and absentee day costs decrease by $3.27 and $2.73, respectively, for every dollar spent on workplace health promotion. In some cases, employer-based health programs have been shown to yield no reduction in health care spending or employer insurance outlay.

Relevant to health outcomes, workplace health promotion programs have demonstrated numerous short and long term benefits. Significantly, workplace physical activity interventions are shown to improve employee fitness, activity behavior, unhealthy lipid levels, work attendance, and job stress, and workplace exercise programs are known to reduce supervisor stress and abusive supervision of subordinates, increasing productivity. Additional improvements have been noted following workplace health programs in injury incidence, blood pressure, cholesterol levels, body mass index, cardiovascular disease risk, dynamic muscle performance, and maximal oxygen consumption. Some improvements vary by gender, with men often experiencing more consequential improvements in body mass index than women. Workplace health promotion is also known to improve the "perceived health status" of employees, enhancing productivity and improving health program participation.

Summarily, the expected outcomes of an ideal workplace health promotion program include:

- "Make workers aware of their health and how being in good health improves quality of life."
- "Workers should take 'ownership' of their behaviors and be accountable for health and cost outcomes."
- "High participation and active involvement in these programs. People should take advantage of the many programs offered."
- "Employees should lose weight, stop smoking, exercise more often, eat a healthy diet, better manage their stress levels, and generally adopt healthy habits."
- "Medical claims costs should go down. The company should experience a lower incidence of certain diseases linked to behaviors like diabetes, heart disease, cancer, chronic obstructive pulmonary disease (COPD), musculoskeletal disorders, and stroke."
- "Workers will be absent less often, disability costs will be controlled, accidents will be avoided, and injury rates should drop sharply."
- "These programs will attract the best talent—and turnover rates will be reduced because we are the employer of choice in the community."
- "Workers will perform at higher levels—they will be happier, have more energy, and produce better results for our company."
- "Establish a culture of health and well-being, where every worker feels valued and important to the enterprise—this will inspire greater loyalty and a high level of engagement."
- "The program will produce a positive return-on-investment (ROI) for the company—for every dollar spent, two or three will be saved."

== Health promotion in low wage industries ==
Approximately half of employees in the United States are employed by small (less than 1000), low wage industries. However, less than 10 percent offer wellness health promotion programs due to lack of financial resource, time and hesitations rooting from investment return. Work health promotion aims to provide better wellbeing to all workers, however, due to economic and social barriers a disproportionate amount of low wage workers are not included in studies regarding employee health promotion.

A 2015 study in Seattle/King County metropolitan area, low wage workers compared to high-earning workers have strong links regarding risky health behaviors. Risky health behaviors are recognized as tobacco use, poor nutrition and sedentary lifestyle which then are factors contributing to chronic disease. This then highlights disproportionate rates of chronic diseases within low-wage earning employees compared to higher socioeconomic earners. It was also revealed in the Seattle/King County metropolitan area study how although the impact of chronic disease are prevalent in low-wage workers, high earners are the group who are more inclined in participating in work health promotion. Low wage industries were found to have barriers including awareness, working conditions, and management.

The largest debate in the Seattle/King County study rooted from the issue of cost. The first cost revealed is the economic financial incentive. Whereby low wage industries examine the importance of investment return. Small companies debate the issue of whether the outcomes of worker health promotion are worthy of investment or labeled as 'organizational priority.' In addition to the importance of profit, is the cost of employee privacy. Human resources managers in the study voiced their issue on privacy and the importance of keeping personal health matters separate from work and their workers.

In addition to high rates of chronic diseases in low wage workers, there are also high rates of morbidity and mortality and hazardous environment exposure because of both socioeconomic and racial disparities. Both gender and racial discrimination are linked to lower wage workers, where women and ethnic minorities contribute to low wage earner statistics. Due to complexities of the environments and workspaces of individual workers with different gender and races, there is a decrease in participants within groups of low-wage workers in worker health promotion programs. Complexities vary to low wage earners contributing to largely part-time earners, wage and benefits distribution, and hazardous field of work.

Suggestions to improve worker participation in low wage industries include convenience and better access. To create worksite vaccinations and healthy diet options, increases the participation for preventive care in these industries. An important factor to access on preventive or worker health promotion programs in low wage industries correlate to better health insurance coverage. The extension and improvement of the Affordable Care Act raises the incentive for both employees and employers to participate in preventive programs. Extension to both full time and part time employees, increases coverage for hazardous work environments, and demographic equity.

== See also ==
- Absenteeism
- Body mass index
- Booster Breaks
- Physical exercise
- Presenteeism
- Public health
- Salutogenesis § Workplace
- Sedentary lifestyle
- Workplace stress
- Workplace wellness
