= How Buildings Learn =

1994 book and TV series by Stewart Brand

- Author: Stewart Brand
- Language: English
- Subject: Architecture, Adaptive reuse
- Genre: Non-fiction
- Publisher: Viking Press
- Publication date: 1994
- Publication place: United States
- Media type: Print
- Pages: 243
- ISBN: 978-0-670-83515-7
- OCLC: 29566065
- Dewey Decimal: 720/.1
- LC Class: NA2542.4 .B73 1994

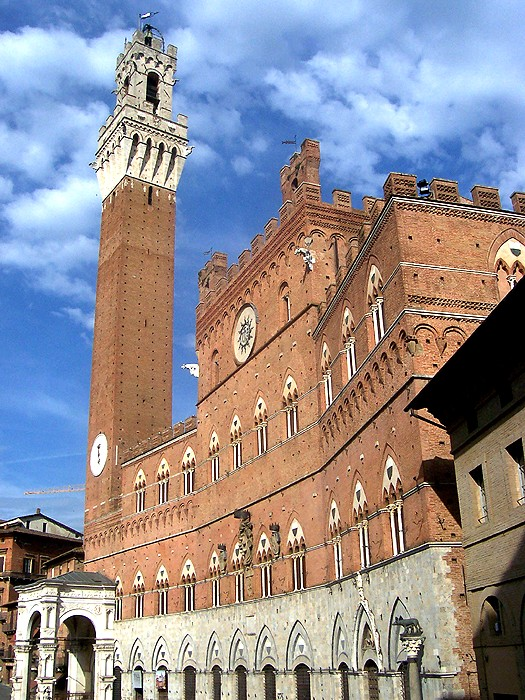
In How Buildings Learn, Stewart Brand cites the example of Palazzo Pubblico in Siena as a building that was constructed in sections over 500 years, eventually evolving to its present state, and which continues to be renovated and remodeled as required by its users.

How Buildings Learn: What Happens After They're Built is an illustrated book on the evolution of buildings and how buildings adapt to changing requirements over long periods. It was written by Stewart Brand and published by Viking Press in 1994. In 1997 it was turned into a 6-part TV series on the BBC. The work challenges the conventional architectural focus on the "magazine photo" moment of completion, arguing instead that buildings perform best when they can evolve over decades.

== Book ==
Brand asserts that the best buildings are made from low-cost, standard designs that people are familiar with, and easy to modify. In this way people can gradually change their buildings to meet their needs. One of his examples is Building 20 at the Massachusetts Institute of Technology. Brand states that a supply of simple, low-cost, easily modified buildings is key to innovation and economic growth. He implies that an expanding property-value market may actually slow innovation and produce a less human-centered community. Among other things, the book details the notion of shearing layers, a concept later adopted in software engineering and strategic foresight.

Criticism of the architect Richard Rogers was removed from the UK edition but remains in the US edition.

== TV series ==
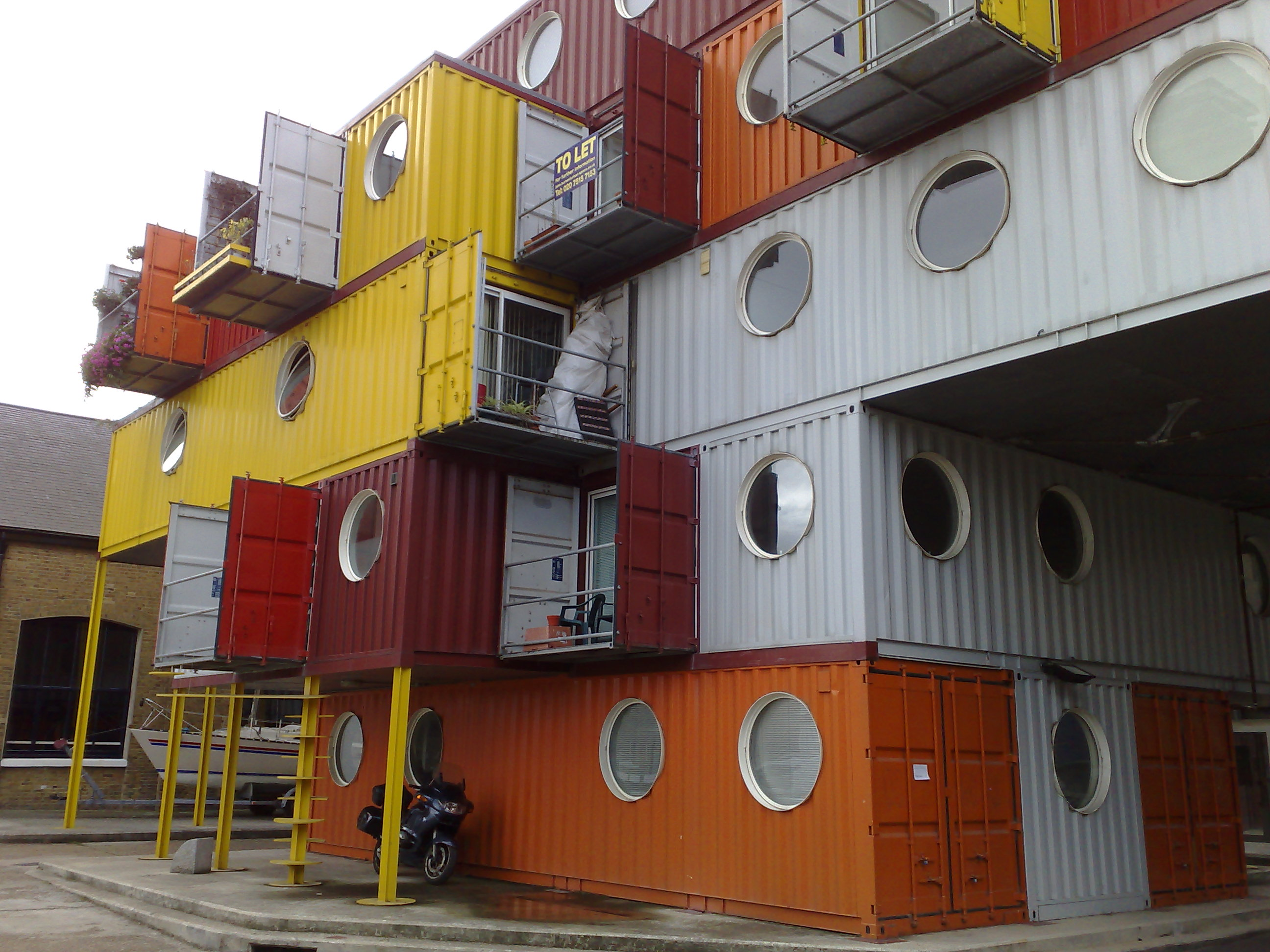
Container City in the London Docklands uses recycled shipping containers for shelter, an idea Brand embraces in How Buildings Learn.

The book inspired a 6-part TV series by the BBC, produced by James Runcie, executive producer Roly Keating, which was screened in July 1997. The series features a soundtrack composed by Brian Eno.

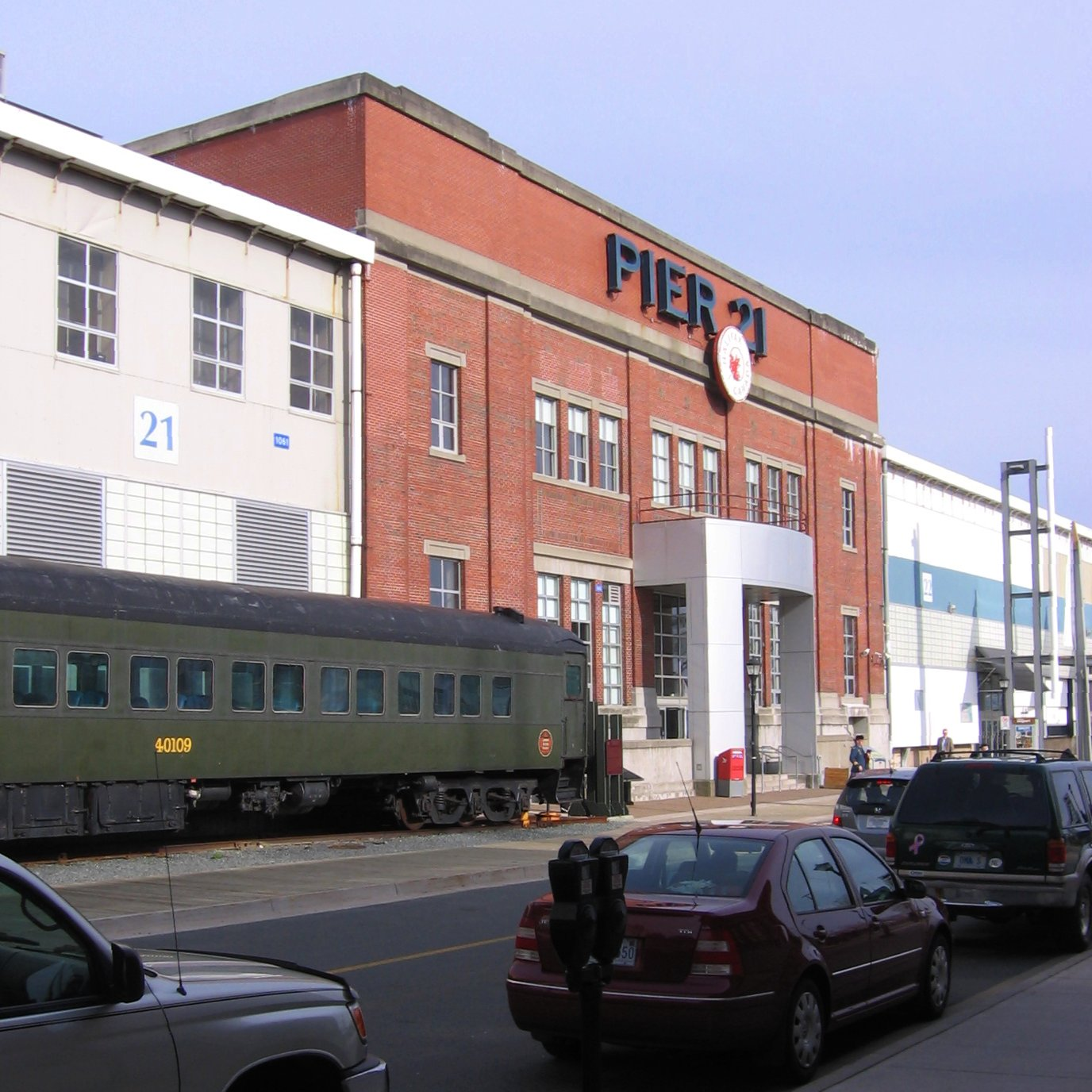
Pier 21, Canada's National Museum of Immigration, exemplifies a building which learns. It is a "low road" building, by Brand's definition. Without fundamental alterations to its basic structure or materials, it began as a break bulk cargo warehouse, then an ocean liner terminal and immigration building, and finally a national museum, the Canadian equivalent of Ellis Island.

In the BBC series, Brand is highly critical of the entire modernist approach to architecture. He fully rejects the "center out" approach of design, where a single person or group designs a building for others to use, in favor of an evolutionary approach where owners can change a building over time to meet their needs. He focuses specific criticisms on modernist innovators like Buckminster Fuller for making round buildings that do not allow any kind of additions or internal divisions, Frank Gehry for making buildings that were hard to maintain, and Le Corbusier for making buildings that did not take into consideration the needs of families. Brand was also critical of French development during the 1980s which did not take local conditions into account and ended up not serving their purpose, like the French National Library which had to take money away from buying new books to deal with the heat produced by so many windows.

Brand stresses the value of an organic kind of building, based on four walls, which is easy to change and expand and grow as the ideal form of building.

== See also ==
- The Timeless Way of Building
- Vernacular architecture
- Christopher Alexander
