= Workplace wellness =

Healthy behavior in the workplace

Workplace wellness, also known as corporate wellbeing outside the United States, is a broad term used to describe activities, programs, and/or organizational policies designed to support healthy behavior in the workplace. This often involves health education, medical screenings, weight management programs, and onsite fitness programs or facilities or off site retreats. It can also include flex-time for exercise, providing onsite kitchen and eating areas, offering healthy food options in vending machines, holding "walk and talk" meetings, and offering financial and other incentives for participation.

Finding resources for healthy heart programs at work

Companies most commonly subsidize workplace wellness programs in the hope they will reduce costs on employee health benefits like health insurance in the long run. Existing research has failed to establish a clinically significant difference in health outcomes, proof of a return on investment, or demonstration of causal effects of treatments. The largest benefits have been observed in groups that were already attempting to manage health concerns, which indicates a strong possibility of selection bias.

== History ==
Wellness programs originated in the early 1900s, as labor unions fought for workers' rights and as employers saw the advantages of having a vital, alert, and rested workforce. A few key manufacturers invested in programs to keep their employees healthy and productive. In the 1950s, Dr. Halbert L. Dunn, chief of the National Office of Vital Statistics, introduced the concept of "high-level wellness" to encourage individuals to maximize their potential progress towards better living.

== Impact ==
Workplace wellness programs have been shown not to prevent the major shared health risk factors specifically for CVD and stroke.

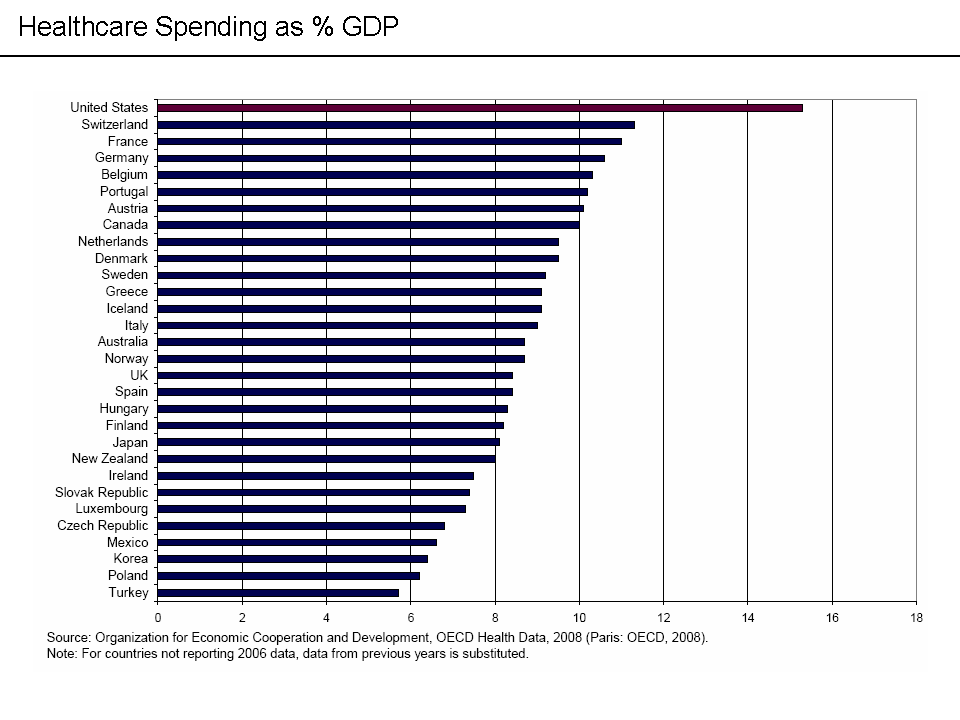
Fraction of gross domestic product (GDP) devoted to health care in a number of developed countries in 2006.

While the stated goal of workplace wellness programs is to improve employee health, many US employers have turned to them to help alleviate the impact of enormous increases in health insurance premiums experienced over the last decade. Some employers have also begun varying the amount paid by their employees for health insurance based on participation in these programs. Cost-shifting strategies alone, through high copayments or coinsurance may create barriers to participation in preventive health screenings or lower medication adherence and hypertension. While it was once believed that for every dollar spent on worksite wellness programs, medical costs fell by $3.27, that hypothesis was disproven by a subordinate of the author of the original study.

One of the reasons for the growth of healthcare costs to employers is the rise in obesity-related illnesses brought about by lack of physical activity, another is the effect of an ageing workforce and the associated increase in chronic health conditions driving higher health care utilization. In 2000 the health costs of overweight and obesity in the US were estimated at $117 billion. Each year obesity contributes to an estimated 112,000 preventable deaths. An East Carolina University study of individuals aged 15 and older without physical limitations found that the average annual direct medical costs were $1,019 for those who are regularly physically active and $1,349 for those who reported being inactive. Being overweight increases yearly per person health care costs by $125, while obesity increases costs by $395. A survey of North Carolina Department of Health and Human Services employees found that approximately 70 cents of every healthcare dollar was spent to treat employees who had one or more chronic conditions, two thirds of which can be attributed to three major lifestyle risk factors: physical inactivity, poor diet, and tobacco use. Obese employees spend 77 percent more on medications than non-obese employees and 72 percent of those medical claims are for conditions that are preventable.

According to Healthy Workforce 2010 and beyond, a joint effort of the US Partnership for Prevention and the US Chamber of Commerce, organizations need to view employee health in terms of productivity rather than as an exercise in health care cost management. The emerging discipline of Health and Productivity Management (HPM) has shown that health and productivity are "inextricably linked" and that a healthy workforce leads to a healthy bottom line. There is now strong evidence that health status can impair day-to-day work performance (e.g., presenteeism) and have a negative effect on job output and quality. Current recommendations for employers are not only to help its unhealthy population become healthy but also to keep its healthy population from becoming sick. Employers are encouraged to implement population-based programs including health risk appraisals and health screenings in conjunction with targeted interventions.

However, some researchers have argued that workplace wellness programs may provide fewer benefits than previously claimed. A 2019 review by Al Lewis and colleagues concluded that many workplace wellness programs did not produce significant health improvements or cost savings and criticized aspects of the industry.

Investing in worksite wellness programs not only aims to improve organizational productivity and presenteeism, but also offers a variety of benefits associated with cost savings and resource availability. A study performed by Johnson & Johnson (J&J) indicated that wellness programs saved organizations an estimated $250 million on health care costs between 2002 and 2008. Workplace wellness interventions performed on high-risk cardiovascular disease employees indicated that at the end of a six-month trial, 57% were reduced to a low-risk status. These individuals received not only cardiac rehabilitation health education but exercise training as well. Further, studies performed by the U.S. Department of Health and Human Services and J&J have revealed that organizations that incorporated exercise components into their wellness programs not only decreased healthcare costs by 30% but improved lost work days by 80%. Thus, investing in preventative health practices has proven to not only be more cost effective in resource spending but in improving employee contributions towards high-cost health claims.

Researchers from the Centers for Disease Control and Prevention studied strategies to prevent cardiovascular disease and found that over a two- to five-year period, companies with comprehensive workplace wellness programs and appropriate health plans in place can yield $3 to $6 for each dollar invested and reduced the likelihood of employee heart attacks and strokes. Also, a 2011 report by Health Fairs Direct which analyzed over 50 studies related to corporate and employee wellness, showed that the return on investment on specific wellness related programs ranged between $1.17 to $6.04. In general, it is estimated that worksite health promotion programs result in a benefit-to-cost ratio of $3.48 in reduced health care costs and $5.82 in lower absenteeism costs per dollar invested, according to the Missouri Department of Health & Senior Services. Additionally, worksite health programs can improve productivity, increase employee satisfaction, demonstrate concern for employees, and improve morale in the workplace.

Leadership involvement in wellness programs can additionally impact employee health outcomes just as well as the programs themselves. A study performed by David Chenoweth indicated the managers who were passionate and committed about their wellness programs increased employee engagement by 60%, even if their wellness goals were not achieved. Leaders are not only tasked with creating the organizational culture but also in coaching and motivating employees to be engaged in that culture.

However, it turns out that employees generally detest these intrusive programs, and wellness's "Net Promoter Score" of -52 places it last on the list of all industries in user satisfaction.

== Barriers ==
The major barrier to further implementation of these programs is the increasing realization that they fail to produce benefits and may harm employees. In 2018, the National Bureau of Economic Research (NBER) found no positive impact. Also in 2018, Medicare found no savings. Further, the NBER study concluded that the previous estimates of savings were largely invalid, due to a pervasive error in study design.

Low participation rates by employees could significantly limit the potential benefits of participating in workplace wellness programs, as could systematically differences between participants and non-participants. Research performed by Gallup indicated that out of the 60% of employees who were aware of their company offered a wellness program only 40% participated. Ongoing management support and accountability are critical to successful worksite health promotion programs.

== Framework ==
Workplace wellness programs can be categorized as primary, secondary, or tertiary prevention efforts, or incorporate elements from multiple types. Primary prevention programs usually target an employee population which is already considered healthy and encourages workers to more frequently engage in health behaviors that will encourage ongoing good health (such as stress management, exercise and healthy eating). Secondary prevention programs are intended to reduce behavior which is considered a risk factor for poor health (such as smoking cessation programs and screenings for high blood pressure). Tertiary health programs are designed to address existing health problems (for example, by encouraging employees to better adhere to specific medication or self-managed care guidelines).

Worksite wellness programs including nutrition and physical activity components may occur separately or as part of a comprehensive worksite health promotion program addressing a broader range of objectives such as smoking cessation, stress management, and weight loss. A conceptual model has been developed by the Task Force for Community Preventive Services (The Community Guide) and serves as an analytic framework for workplace wellness and depicts the components of such comprehensive programs. These components include worksite interventions including 1) environmental changes and policy strategies, 2) informational messages, and 3) behavioral and social skills or approaches.

Worksite environmental change and policy strategies are designed to make healthy choices easier. They target the whole workforce rather than individuals by modifying physical or organizational structures. Examples of environmental changes may include enabling access to healthy foods (e.g., through modification of cafeteria offerings or vending machine content) or enhancing opportunities to engage in physical activity (e.g., by providing onsite facilities for exercise). Policy strategies may involve changing rules and procedures for employees, such as offering health insurance benefits, reimbursement for health club memberships, healthy food and beverage policies or allowing time for breaks or meals at the worksite.

Informational and educational strategies attempt to build the knowledge base necessary to inform optimal health practices. Information and learning experiences facilitate voluntary adaptations of behavior conducive to health. Examples include health-related information provided on the company intranet, posters or pamphlets, nutrition education software, and information about the benefits of a healthy lifestyle, including diet and exercise. Behavioral and social strategies attempt to influence behaviors indirectly by targeting individual cognition (awareness, self-efficacy, perceived support, intentions) believed to mediate behavior changes. These strategies can include structuring the leadership involvement and social environment to provide support for people trying to initiate or maintain lifestyle behavior changes, for example, weight change. Such interventions may involve individual or group behavioral counselling, skill-building activities such as cue control, use of rewards or reinforcement, and inclusion of coworker, manager/leader or family members for support.

== Health economics of workplace wellness programs ==
Wellness programs are typically employer sponsored and are created with the theory that they will encourage healthy behaviors and decrease overall health costs over time. Wellness programs function as primary care interventions as they are an example of primary prevention methods to reduce risks to many diseases or conditions. These programs are widely known as employee assistance programs or EAPs and include various physical and mental health services to employees.

Workplace wellness programs have been around since the 1970s and have gained new popularity as the push for cost savings in the health delivery system becomes more evident as a result of high health care expenditures in the U.S. Employer wellness programs have shown to have a return on investment of about $3 for every $1 invested over a multi-year period, making them appealing to many as an effective way to achieve results and control costs. Most recently, the 2016 winner of the "best wellness program" award, Wellsteps, was shown to have harmed employees at the Boise School District and fabricated its savings figures.

Workplace wellness programs have many components to help improve health outcomes and decrease health disparities. These components include smoking cessation programs, fitness center memberships, nutrition aids, and biometric screenings, often in exchange for health insurance premium reductions. The benefits of wellness programs are not limited to corporations and their employees; Otenyo and Smith argue that engaging in such programs produces positive spillover effects for society that are not reflected in markets, leading to them under consumption.

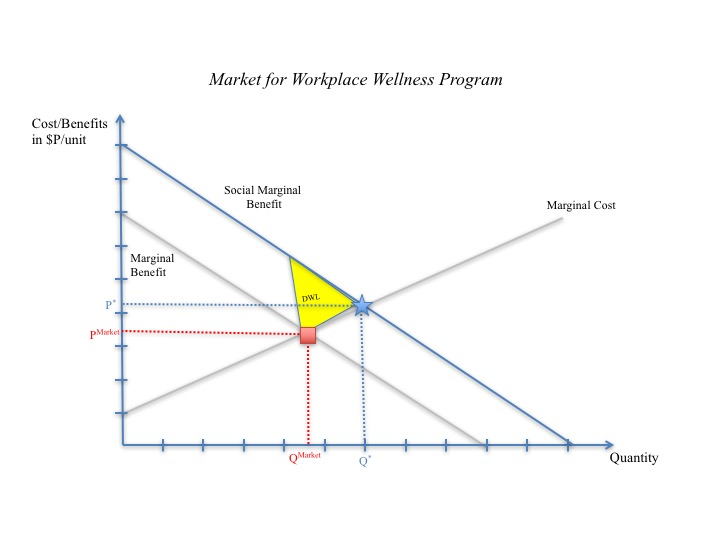
Owing to their positive spillover effects on society, the social marginal benefits of wellness programs are higher than their private marginal benefits, leading to their under consumption.

Workplace wellness programs benefit employers as well; while the various components of the wellness programs helps to keep employees healthy, employers are able to increase recruitment and retention of workers. Some employers have also utilized penalties to improve employee participation within the company wellness program. Wellness programs can reduce employer costs by linking employees' health insurance rates to their participation and success in meeting wellness goals. While wellness programs promote healthier lifestyles and can bring significant cost savings, concerns about invasion of privacy and participation costs have arisen.

The future of wellness programs as a valid method of preventative healthcare is still up for debate. Evidence of improved health outcomes for participants is mixed in terms of effectiveness. Some studies attempt to address the question if "more is always better in the workplace," and the value that can be found through wellness program components and their outcomes.

One large study though, did not find health improvements for premium incentive-based workplace weight loss programs.

Writing in the New York Times, Frank and Carroll laid out several concerns with wellness programs, including limitations in empirical studies and the possibility that employers use these programs to shift costs to employees. That said, the 2019 Kaiser Family Foundation Employer Health Benefits Survey indicates that organizations continue to enact such programs due to their perceived benefits for employee health, morale, and productivity.

Wellness programs have created a $6 billion industry due to its reputation of reducing health care costs. In their 2013 Workplace Wellness Programs Study, RAND Corporation researchers concluded that while lifestyle-focused wellness programs can reduce risk factors and motivate healthy behavior, the reductions in healthcare costs are less than previously reported. However, most wellness studies that report the positive results of the wellness programs are not of high quality, indicate only short-term results, and do not justify causation. Moreover, these studies are sponsored by their own wellness industry, creating bias. Other studies find that the programs don't improve health outcomes or reduce health care costs.

In fact, a decrease of employers' health care costs has been simply passed on the employees. Based on the Affordable Care Act, employers are able to charge unhealthy employees up to 30 to 50 percent more of total premium costs. This has resulted in pushback from employees who have not met mandated health goals like quitting smoking or reducing body mass index (BMI).

On the other hand, research on the 2003 PepsiCo Healthy Living program suggests that the wellness plan helps reduce health care costs after the third year of implementing the disease management components of the program. But, the wellness program does not show evidence of lower costs due to the lifestyle changes in the short run. This result is consistent with the one-year study with the 3,300 employees of the University of Illinois at Urbana-Champaign in 2016. The study indicates that participation in a wellness program does not result in healthier employees or reduced health care costs. The research also shows that without an incentive, about 46.9 percent participated in the wellness program. Then, the change in monetary incentive from $0 to $100 increases participation by 12 percent, from 46.9 percent to 58.5 percent. An additional incentive of $200 increases the participation from 58.5 to 62.5 percent. This study shows that when the company increases participants by only 4.5 percent or reduce 4.5 percent of non-participants or high medical spending employees, it will compensate the total cost of the specific wellness program. This result is consistent with other studies that the wellness programs do not help lower health care costs, but only have passed on the costs to other employees. Regarding the employment and productivity, the participants believe that management places an importance on health, fitness, and safety. However, the study shows no significant difference on the happier feelings or more productive at work among the participants.

=== Affordable Care Act and effects on workplace wellness ===
There are conversations surrounding the role of the Affordable Care Act and in general insurance on its effects on workplace wellness. Sixty percent of Americans obtain their insurance coverage solely in their respective workspaces. However, larger companies are more inclined to offer employee health insurance and wellness programs than those in small businesses. It is critical for workplace wellness to have increase participation, provisions under insurance coverage for small employers to increase incentives expands participation for small businesses. The Affordable Care Act (ACA) includes the Prevention and Public Health Fund whereby provisions are created to address and expand community prevention, public health infrastructure and training, clinical prevention, and workforce wellness research in the large American working demographic.

The role of the ACA increases programs for worksite wellness is a strategy to tackle the growing rate of chronic diseases in the United States. In a study by the CDC, the implementation of worksite wellness incurs a three-time investment over a dollar spent and have been reported positively by companies such as Johnson & Johnson, Citibank, Duke University, Chevron etc.

Included in the Affordable Care Act are chronic diseases management to be offered in the essential health benefits. As workers age, health care costs and chronic diseases such as depression, anxiety and diabetes are proportional to its growing increase. Owing to this increase, the negative effect on workplace productivity and presentism is declining. ACA implements these management benefits to reduce the declining and negative effects.

In the CDC study on workplace wellness and ACA, the solution resolves to health culture and its strength in workplaces given that only 26% reported that their employees have strong culture of health in their organizations. In 2014, it was found that the Affordable Care Act expands incentive limit by 10 percent. Implementing incentives such as discounts that puts value in health choices and behavior illustrated a 73% positive feedback. In addition, increasing tax on sugar-sweetened drinks, would decrease obesity levels in US adults by 3.5%. The study then concluded towards preventative practices and reform promotes health and quality on workers and increasing productivity. Included with ACA's incentive plan is a non-discriminatory law or HIPAA to requiring availability to alternative wellness programs if need be.

The Affordable Care Act has importance in contextualizing health care promotions in the workplace. The Affordable Care Act, in its revisions and improvements not only persuades workspaces both low and high wage industries to implement health care promotion. Small employers often are underrepresented in the surveys and data for ACA, low wage industries in the past have been underrepresented under the Affordable Care Act, however, with improvements in representation to cover both low and high earning workers, more participation can be seen in workplace wellness.

According to research by Hoffman and Kennedy-Armbruster (2015) in the American College of Sports Medicine Health & Fitness Journal, the top nine workplace/worksite wellness best practices include:

1. Leadership support (i.e., modeling, resource allocation, etc.)
2. Relevant and personalized programs (using employee interests and available aggregate data)
3. Partnership with employees, employer, organizations, and local community.
4. Comprehensive and evidence-based programs (using eight dimensions of wellness can be a helpful tool- emotional, environmental, financial, intellectual, occupational, physical, social, and spiritual)
5. Implementation that is well planned, coordinated, fully executed, and evaluated for success and accountability
6. Employee engagement through organization and planning wellness efforts
7. Formal and comprehensive communication strategies/plan
8. Data driven decisions that include measurement, evaluation, reporting, and analytics
9. HIPAA compliant programs."

== Importance of leadership support ==
Lawrence et al. (2015) indicates strengths and weakness of current worksite wellness models providing key considerations for the development of a strong program. Key strengths indicated were "leadership commitment, organizational culture and environmental structure" to build a culture of health, ultimately promoting the improvement among non-communicable diseases. Furthermore, Lawrence et al. (2015) suggest that these characteristics are indicative of a "high-quality program regardless of the model used: 1) leadership support, 2) clear importance of health and wellness by organization culture and environment, 3) program responsiveness to changing needs, 4) utilization of current technology, and 5) support from community health programs".

A recent survey conducted by Harris Poll and reported the American Psychological Association (APA) (2016) stated just over 30% of Americans indicate participation in worksite wellness programs, and 44% indicate that employee wellness is supported by their workplace culture. Furthermore, this data indicates when senior leaders are involved and committed to wellness program initiatives 73% of employees feel their organization supports a healthy lifestyle and their overall well-being; however, only 4 of 10 Americans said that their leadership team supports wellness initiatives. Further evidence reported by RAND (2013) stated "evidence from case studies suggests that for programs to be a success, senior managers need to consider wellness an organizational priority to shift the company culture. Buy-in from direct supervisors is crucial to generate excitement and connect employees to available resources."

Furthermore, Hoert, Herd, and Hambrick (2016) used the Leading by Example instrument to find "employees experiencing higher levels of leadership support reported higher wellness program participation, lower stress, and higher levels of health behaviors". Stokes, Henley and Herget (2006) reported on findings from a wellness initiative pilot program using the North Carolina Department of Health and Human Services. This organization was selected as the pilot due to the leadership support model and its large size. This program focused on "reducing major chronic diseases (including cardiovascular diseases), demonstrating the effectiveness of a wellness program model that includes a full-time department-level director, establish wellness committees to sustain work environments that promote and support employee health and wellness, and change policies and environments to help employees be more active, make healthier food choices, avoid tobacco, and manage stress". Results after the first year of this program indicated that 62% of employees participated in at least one wellness activity, 51% exercising more often, 50% stating wellness programs as the most popular activity, 49% eating more fruits and vegetables, 27% were closer to a healthy weight, and 106 employees stopped smoking and 149 reduced tobacco use.

Finally, Ross et al. (2013) report the increased importance of physical activity at the workplace with the increasing sedentary job responsibilities, and the positive effect of worksite physical activity programs have on health outcomes, including cardiovascular disease and metabolic conditions. Additionally, their research indicates appropriate models for these successes are through "a health and wellness culture driven by leadership support, specialized programs designed for the employee population, and strategic plans that partner with current organizational goals".

== Program development and best practices example ==
=== Example ===
The framework of The Community Guide, program components (goals and objectives) set out by Health People 2020, the Workplace Health Model outlined by the CDC, and other best practices provides a comprehensive foundation for a worksite wellness platform regarding program development, implementation, and evaluation. Using the components above, an employee (or employer) can use employee interest, employee aggregate health data, and the LHIs as priorities to guide goals and objectives, develop programs and evaluation to facilitate, collaborate, and motivate their employees to improve their health. The following example will use the above-mentioned workplace wellness program components as it relates to the goal of weight reduction by increased physical activity through leadership support in order to decrease cardiovascular disease, ultimately impacting the Healthy People 2020 LHI "Nutrition, Physical Activity, and Obesity". The following is a simplified example for (a fabricated) Company ABC:

==== Assessment ====
An employee (or Company ABC Human Resource Department) reviews the current aggregate data provided by the employer insurance company as it relates to weight, physical activity, and cardiovascular measures, including cholesterol, blood pressure, biometric screening, physical activity, smoking, or other indicators. Company ABC will review the available company culture survey results as it relates to wellness for both social and environmental supports. Conversations and focus groups will be established to assess and determine employee engagement, interests, concerns, and other wellness related brainstorming.

==== Implementation ====
Using The Community Guide, Health People 2020, CDC recommendations, and other peer-reviewed research (evidence-based programs) an organization can design and implement recommended intervention, policies, programs, or environmental supports to ensure the success of the desired goals and outcomes. Based on the CDC's recommendation to include a multidimensional intervention framework, the wellness coordinator for Company ABC has decided on the following programs to support the goals of physical activity through leadership support to help improve cardiovascular health.

- Promoting leadership success stories on with physical activity and movement through the organization's monthly newsletter
- Marketing with leadership photos inviting participants to come to the planned event
- Revised smoking and smokeless tobacco policy which will be enforced by leadership support
- Health coaches for increase physical activity, nutritional changes, and tobacco cessation, including quit kits and available pharmaceuticals in the onsite wellness clinic
- Promotion of health insurance health coaches for physical activity and nutrition through telephonic support
- Quarterly health education lunch and learn on cardiovascular health topics (cholesterol, heart disease, metabolic disease, etc.) as it relates to physical activity (including nutrition)
- Implementation of recommended (informal) policy for walking meetings, especially led by senior leadership and managers
- Implement point-of-decision prompts to use the stairs
- Physical activity challenge led by leaders at Company ABC
- Free and onsite health risk assessment and blood draw events for employees, spouses and dependents
- Onsite blood pressure cuffs for blood pressure self-monitoring

==== Evaluation ====
Utilizing past aggregate data from health insurance claims and company culture survey from Company ABC a baseline will be established prior to the program implementation. Following the wellness coordinators strategic plan for Company ABC, measures post-program (1 year) will be collected, including an employee satisfaction survey, informal forums, a collection of corresponding year aggregate data from the insurance company and data from the annual culture survey. Data analysis will be conducted on program successes, strengths, opportunities, threats, and weakness; furthermore, interpretation of results will be collected and reported back to the leadership team for review and support for the next year's strategic planning. Additional comparisons can be made to the Healthy People 2020 LHI's Report Card to determine how the employees of Company ABC are doing in comparison to the reported United States data, as well as how they are supporting the overall goals of the Healthy People 2020 goals.

== Impact ==
A meta-analysis of the literature on costs and savings associated with wellness programs, medical costs fell by about $3.27 for every dollar spent on wellness programs and absenteeism costs fell by about $2.73 for every dollar spent. A 2019 study in the journal JAMA found that a workplace wellness program at BJ's Wholesale Club had a very limited impact. The study found no impact on health measures or health care costs, but participants in the study did report that they became more knowledgeable about health behaviors.

The Centers for Disease Control and Prevention conducted a case study of a workplace wellness program at Capital Metro, the local transit authority in Austin, TX. The study found that there was a reduction in costs associated with employee health care and absenteeism after the workplace welfare program was implemented. In one large study of 1,542 participants across 119 workplaces, 57.7% of participants showed significant reductions in 7 of the 10 cardiovascular health risk categories studied. Johnson & Johnson, one of the world's largest companies, has saved $250 million on health care costs within the last decade as a result of wellness programs; from 2002 to 2008, the return was $2.71 for every dollar spent.

== Artificial Intelligence and Workplace Wellness ==
The rapid proliferation of artificial intelligence (AI) systems into the modern workplace has ignited a wide-ranging discourse concerning the potential implications for employee well-being. As these sophisticated technologies become increasingly integrated into organizational processes and workflows, valid apprehensions have arisen regarding the potential erosion of job security, autonomy, privacy, and ethical decision-making. In light of the expanding influence of artificial intelligence (AI) across various industries, a recent survey by Ernst & Young LLP reveals that 71% of US employees harbor apprehensions about its implications. The study discloses that 48% of respondents express heightened concerns about AI compared to a year ago, with 41% attributing their unease to the perceived rapid evolution of AI technology. Moreover, 75% of employees fear that AI may render certain jobs obsolete, and 65% are uneasy about the prospect of AI replacing their roles. Concurrently, proponents highlight the myriad opportunities AI affords to enhance workplace wellness through task automation, human-machine collaboration, personalized well-being support which includes corporate wellness retreats, and fostering inclusivity. This piece aims to critically examine both the challenges and potential benefits of AI integration concerning employee welfare, and propose recommendations for a responsible and ethically grounded approach to harnessing this transformative technology.

The advent of artificial intelligence in the modern workplace undoubtedly introduces a multitude of challenges and opportunities concerning employee well-being. While valid concerns exist regarding job insecurity, erosion of autonomy, privacy violations, and the perpetuation of biases, AI systems also hold immense potential to enhance workplace wellness through task automation, human-machine collaboration, personalized well-being support, and fostering inclusivity. However, realizing these benefits while mitigating the risks necessitates a responsible, ethically grounded, and human-centric approach to AI integration.

=== Challenges to Workplace Wellness Posed by AI Implementation ===
Job Insecurity and Occupational Stress

One of the primary concerns encompassing AI's encroachment into the workplace sphere is the fear of technological unemployment and replacement. As AI systems become increasingly adept at performing tasks traditionally conducted by human labor, trepidations surrounding potential job displacement have intensified. This perceived job insecurity can precipitate heightened stress levels, anxiety, and an overarching sense of precariousness among the workforce. Prolonged exposure to such occupational stressors has been empirically linked to adverse physical and psychological health outcomes, including burnout, depression, and cardiovascular disease. In advanced economies, about 60 percent of jobs may be impacted by AI. Roughly half the exposed jobs may benefit from AI integration, enhancing productivity and for the other half, AI applications may execute key tasks currently performed by humans, which could lower labor demand, leading to lower wages and reduced hiring. In the most extreme cases, some of these jobs may disappear. In 2022, 19% of American workers were in jobs that are the most exposed to AI, in which the most important activities may be either replaced or assisted by AI.

Erosion of Autonomy and Self-Determination

A further challenge posed by the integration of AI systems is the potential diminution of human autonomy and self-determination within the workplace. As these technologies assume an increasing array of decision-making responsibilities and automate intricate processes, employees may experience a concomitant reduction in their perceived sense of control and agency over their professional roles. This deprivation of autonomy can detrimentally impact job satisfaction, engagement, and overall eudaimonia well-being, as humans inherently thrive when imbued with a sense of volition and self-directedness.

Privacy Concerns and Workplace Surveillance

The deployment of AI in workplace contexts often necessitates the collection and analysis of vast troves of employee data to train and optimize these systems. This data could potentially be leveraged for continuous performance monitoring, productivity tracking, and even predictive modeling of employee behavior and prospective tenure. While such practices may ostensibly aim to enhance operational efficiency, they raise significant ethical concerns regarding privacy rights and could engender an environment of pervasive surveillance and mistrust, undermining psychological safety and well-being.

Perpetuation of Bias and Discrimination

Despite their computational sophistication, AI systems are not immune to the insidious biases and flaws inherent in the data they are trained upon or the algorithms they employ. In the absence of rigorous ethical oversight and debiasing protocols, AI applications in the workplace run the risk of perpetuating or even amplifying existing societal biases related to protected characteristics such as gender, race, age, or disability status. This could precipitate unfair treatment, discriminatory practices, and a hostile work environment for affected employees, adversely impacting their psychological and emotional welfare.

=== Potential Benefits of AI for Cultivating Workplace Wellness ===
Automation of Tedious and Physically Arduous Tasks

Despite the concerns surrounding occupational displacement, the judicious implementation of AI systems also presents opportunities to alleviate the burden of physically and cognitively tedious tasks on human workers. By automating these repetitive, monotonous processes, AI can effectively reduce the mental and physical strain experienced by employees, mitigating risks of burnout, musculoskeletal disorders, and psychological distress. This could enable employees to reallocate their efforts towards more engaging, stimulating, and fulfilling aspects of their roles, potentially enhancing job satisfaction and overall well-being.

Human-Machine Collaboration and Capability Augmentation

Rather than conceptualizing AI as a replacement for human labor, an alternative paradigm envisions a symbiotic relationship wherein these technologies augment and enhance human capabilities. AI systems can function as intelligent virtual assistants, providing real-time insights, analysis, and data-driven recommendations to support complex decision-making processes. This collaboration between humans and AI could effectively reduce cognitive load, improve productivity, and foster a more efficient and rewarding work experience for employees.

Personalized Employee Well-being Support

AI can also be leveraged to directly support and promote employee well-being initiatives within organizations. AI-powered applications could facilitate personalized well-being assessments, tailoring recommendations for stress management techniques, mindfulness practices, or lifestyle interventions based on individual needs and preferences. Furthermore, conversational AI agents could potentially provide virtual coaching or counseling services, offering a more accessible and scalable approach to mental health support. By harnessing the vast computational power and data processing capabilities of AI, organizations can offer highly customized and effective well-being resources to their employees, promoting better mental and physical health outcomes.

Fostering Inclusion, Accessibility, and Workplace Belongingness

AI technologies also hold significant promise in fostering more inclusive, accessible, and supportive workplace environments. For instance, AI-driven language translation and transcription services can facilitate seamless communication and collaboration among employees with diverse linguistic backgrounds, mitigating barriers to participation and fostering a sense of belongingness. Additionally, AI-powered assistive technologies can aid employees with disabilities in performing their roles more effectively, enabling greater autonomy, productivity, and full participation in the workplace. By leveraging AI to create more equitable and accommodating workspaces, organizations can cultivate a culture of inclusivity, enhancing overall employee well-being and organizational commitment.

The global artificial intelligence market size was valued at US$196.63 billion in 2023 and is projected to expand at a compound annual growth rate (CAGR) of 37.3% from 2023 to 2030. This growth has been driven in part by the immense cost savings and productivity gains AI can offer businesses. AI applications in workplaces are estimated to save over 300 billion hours of worker productivity annually. China has emerged as a global leader in AI implementation, on research, for example, China produced about one-third of both AI journal papers and AI citations worldwide in 2021. In economic investment, China accounted for nearly one-fifth of global private investment funding in 2021, attracting $17 billion for AI start-ups.

Recommendations for Responsible AI Integration and Ethical Governance

To effectively navigate the intricate landscape of AI's impact on workplace wellness, and mitigate potential challenges while capitalizing on the opportunities, organizations must adopt a responsible, ethically grounded, and human-centric approach to AI integration. The following recommendations provide a framework for achieving this objective:

Transparent Communication and Employee Involvement

Fostering an environment of open communication and actively involving employees in the decision-making processes surrounding AI implementation is paramount. Organizations should prioritize transparent dissemination of information regarding the intended purposes, functionalities, and anticipated impacts of AI systems on work processes and employee roles. Furthermore, providing avenues for employee feedback, concerns, and active participation in shaping AI integration strategies can help alleviate fears, build trust, and ensure that these technologies are deployed in a manner that genuinely supports employee well-being.

Robust Training, Upskilling, and Professional Development

To address concerns surrounding job displacement precipitated by AI adoption, organizations invest in comprehensive training, upskilling, and professional development initiatives for their workforce. By equipping employees with the requisite technical competencies and cognitive capabilities to effectively collaborate with AI systems, organizations foster a sense of adaptability, resilience, and future-proof their human capital. This approach to skill development enhances workforce preparedness and mitigates job insecurity.

Ethical AI Governance, Oversight, and Algorithmic Auditing

Establishing a robust ethical governance framework and rigorous oversight mechanisms for the development, deployment, and continuous monitoring of AI systems within the workplace is a crucial imperative. This includes conducting thorough assessments to identify and mitigate potential biases in AI algorithms and training data, implementing strict data privacy and security protocols, and ensuring that AI decision-making processes are transparent, explainable, and subject to human oversight and accountability measures. Independent external audits, algorithmic impact assessments, and regular ethical reviews can further strengthen governance and ensure compliance with established principles and industry best practices.

Human-Centered Design and Preserving Employee Agency

Throughout the AI integration process, organizations should prioritize a human-centered design philosophy that places the needs, preferences, and well-being of employees at the forefront. This involves actively soliciting and incorporating user feedback, ensuring intuitive and accessible human-machine interfaces, and empowering employees to maintain agency, control, and decision-making autonomy over their work processes. By adopting a human-centered approach, organizations can effectively mitigate concerns regarding the erosion of autonomy and foster a sense of empowerment, enhancing job satisfaction and overall eudemonic well-being.

Interdisciplinary Collaboration and Stakeholder Engagement

Navigating the interplay between AI, workplace dynamics, and employee well-being requires a multidisciplinary approach. Organizations can foster collaboration among diverse stakeholders, including technologists, human resource professionals, legal and ethical experts, occupational health specialists, and employee representatives. This collaboration can yield holistic perspectives, identify potential blind spots, and inform strategies that harmonize technological innovation with employee welfare.

== See also ==
- Booster Breaks
- Employee assistance programs
- Employee benefit
- Health fair
- Managed care
- Obesity
- Occupational cardiovascular disease
- Occupational safety and health
- Organisation climate
- Organizational culture
- Participatory ergonomics
- Philosophy of happiness
- Pre-work assembly
- Presenteeism
- Sick building syndrome
- Total Worker Health
- Work–life balance
- Workplace health promotion
- Workplace stress
