= Nipastat =

Chemical compound

Nipastat is the brand name for a mixture of parabens (parahydroxybenzoates) by Clariant, a chemicals company. Parabens are a type of compound used as a preservative in pharmaceuticals, cosmetics, and food. Nipastat is a white powder at room temperature, but is typically dissolved into a liquid product. Nipastat acts to prevent the growth of bacteria, mold, and yeast. Nipastat is a mixture of five common parabens: methylparaben (50-60%), butylparaben (12-17%), ethylparaben, (13-18%) propylparaben (6-9%), and isobutylparaben (6-9%). When Nipastat is added to a product, the recommended final weight of Nipastat is between 0.05% and 0.3% of the total weight. Nipastat is stable at a range of pHs between 4 and 8.

== Uses ==
Nipastat has been approved for use in Europe, the United States, and Japan. These are the only locations where it is currently in use. It is frequently added to pharmaceutical creams, lotions and ointments, as well as consumer products including lotions, cosmetics, shampoo, and food.
