= C10H12O3 =

The molecular formula C_{10}H_{12}O_{3} (molar mass : 180.2 g/mol, exact mass : 180.0786438 u) may refer to:

- Anisyl acetate
- Canolol, a phenolic compound found in canola oil
- Carvonic acid
- Coniferyl alcohol
- Isopropylparaben
- Isopropyl salicylate
- Propylparaben
- Thujaplicinol
- 2,5-Dimethoxyphenylacetaldehyde
