= Toxic-Free Cosmetics Act =

2020 law in Washington State, US

The Toxic-Free Cosmetics Act is a law of Washington State, United States, introduced in an effort to prevent consumers and practitioners from being affected by the potentially-harmful chemical substances involved in many cosmetic practices. Cancer, fertility issues, hormone disruption and other issues have been linked to such practices and their corresponding substances. Other states, such as California have since adopted this law.

Signed into law in 2020, it took effect at the start of 2025. As of January 1, 2025, the TFCA prohibits nine toxic chemicals and chemical classes from products made, distributed or sold. The restricted chemicals are as follows: formaldehyde, lead and lead compounds, mercury and mercury compounds, methylene glycol, ortho-phthalates, triclosan, o-Phenylenediamine and its salts, m-Phenylenediamine and its salts, and Per- and polyfluoroalkyl substances substances (PFAS).

In other parts of the world, many countries have banned these substances and more. For example, the European Union has banned the aforementioned in addition to Dibutyl phthalate, Diethylhexyl phthalate, Isobutylparaben, Isopropylparaben, Paraformaldehyde, Quaternium-15.
