= Brazilian hair straightening =

Semi-permanent hair straightening method

Brazilian hair straightening is a semi-permanent hair straightening method done by temporarily sealing a liquid solution consisting of formaldehyde or a formaldehyde derivative and a preservative solution into the hair with a hair iron.

The technique has many variations and is known by several other names and brands, including Brazilian Blowout, Breezilian straightening, Brazilian Keratin Treatment, Professional Probelle, BKT, and Keratin Cure. It is called Escova Progressiva in Brazil and Alisado brasileiro in Portugal.

The original formulation included formaldehyde H_{2}CO or methylene glycol H_{2}C(OH)_{2}. The two products readily interconvert, and coexist in chemical equilibrium, when dissolved in water or body fluids. Since formaldehyde is a known health hazard, the compositions have been banned in several countries including Canada and the European Union. It is still performed in the United States, though there are regulations and have been controversies regarding the treatment. As of 2024, the states of Maryland and California have begun the process to ban all personal care products containing formaldehyde. In California, Governor Gavin Newsom signed it into law under the Toxic-Free Cosmetics Act.

== Characteristics ==
Brazilian hair straightening treatments are meant to mostly or partially eliminate hair frizz and straighten curls and waves. They can be performed on all types of hair, whether natural or chemically-treated (bleached, highlighted, colored, permed, relaxed or previously straightened).

The effect usually lasts about three months. Treatment must be repeated every few months to straighten the new hair growth.

Although keratin treatment is not long-lasting, hair should not be treated with keratin more than three times per year. Excessive keratin can damage hair, causing it to break off.

== Process ==
The application technique is similar to the Japanese Yuko System, in that the hair is heated with flat irons to bind the product into the hair cuticle.

Depending on the treatment used, the customer may have to avoid washing, wetting, pinning or constraining the hair in any way (e.g. with hair clips, pony tails, or headbands) for some period after application, up to three days.

It is also confused or mistaken for keratina, another hair treatment.

The name "straightener" is arguably incorrect because it does not chemically alter the structure of the hair.

== Formaldehyde controversy ==
Between 2010 and 2012, there was a dispute between the manufacturers and importers of Brazilian hair straightening products on one hand, and various US federal and state health agencies on the other, about the proper labeling and health warning of the products. The dispute centered about the chemical compounds formaldehyde (H_{2}CO) and methylene glycol (H_{2}C(OH)_{2}), which are the active ingredients of the process, responsible for binding the keratin to the hair. Formaldehyde is a gas that, when dissolved in water (including fluids in the human body), converts partially to methylene glycol. In the liquid, the two compounds coexist in a chemical equilibrium.

=== Regulations about formaldehyde levels ===
Formaldehyde in the air has long been recognized as a major occupational hazard in many industries; such as those using urea-formaldehyde (UF) adhesives, or UF-based products like fiberboard, and UFFI spray foam insulation. Levels below 0.05 parts per million (ppm) were found to be positively correlated with eye and nasal irritation. It has also been implicated in the development of childhood asthma, and, in 2006, the WHO International Agency for Research on Cancer (IARC) classified it as a 'known human carcinogen'.

Because of these concerns, since 1976 or earlier, European regulations on cosmetics banned products containing or releasing formaldehyde. Products containing any aldehydes more than 0.001% in leave-on products or 0.01% in rinse-off products were required to list the ingredients explicitly in their product labels.

The US Federal Occupational Safety and Health Administration (OSHA) sets a long-term permissible exposure limit (PEL) of 0.75 ppm of formaldehyde in the air, and a short term exposure limit of 2.0 ppm.

=== Occupational safety and health hazard alert ===
OSHA issued a hazard alert and created an informational site in response to an investigation into complaints from stylists and hair salon owners about exposure to formaldehyde while using hair smoothing products such as Brazilian Blowout (Acai Professional Smoothing Solution, Professional Brazilian Blowout Solution), Brasil Cacau Cadiveu, Keratin Complex Smoothing Therapy (Natural Keratin Smoothing Treatment, Express Blow Out, Natural Keratin Smoothing Treatment Blonde), and Marcia Teixeira (Advanced Brazilian Keratin Treatment, Extreme De-Frizzing Treatment). OSHA conducted air sampling at multiple salons and found formaldehyde in the air when stylists were using hair smoothing products. Some of these products were labeled "formaldehyde free" or did not list formaldehyde on the product label or in the Material Safety Data Sheet (MSDS). In most cases, where the label did not state that the product had formaldehyde in it, OSHA found that hair salon owners using those products did not know that hair smoothing products contain or could expose workers to formaldehyde because manufacturers, importers, and distributors did not include the correct hazard warnings on the product's label or MSDS.

During Federal OSHA investigations, air tests showed formaldehyde at levels above OSHA's limits in salons using Brazilian Blowout Acai Professional Smoothing Solution, labeled "formaldehyde free", and Brasil Cacau Cadiveu. Both Federal and State OSHA have found violations at several manufacturers, importers, and distributors (GIB LLC dba Brazilian Blowout, Keratronics Inc., Pro Skin Solutions, M&M International Inc., Copomon, INOVA Professional). The violations include failing to list formaldehyde as a hazardous ingredient on the MSDS (the hazard warning sheet) provided to downstream users (e.g., salon owners, stylists), failing to include proper hazard warnings on product labels, and failing to list the health effects of formaldehyde exposure on the MSDS. Labels must include ingredient and hazard warning information and the MSDS must provide users with information about the chemicals in a product, the hazards to workers, and how to use a product safely.

If salon owners decide to use products that may contain or release formaldehyde, they must then follow the requirements in OSHA's formaldehyde and hazard communication standards to protect worker safety. Requirements include steps such as testing salon air during treatments to determine formaldehyde levels, providing adequate ventilation and appropriate personal protective equipment for workers performing treatments, and training workers on the hazards of formaldehyde. Failure to follow the requirements of the formaldehyde and hazard communication standards has consequences. As part of OSHA's enforcement duties, the agency issues citations to five manufacturers, three distributors, two beauty schools and 42 salon owners. Citations were issued for reasons including, but not limited to: failing to communicate the hazards of exposure to formaldehyde, formaldehyde levels were above the OSHA 15-minute short-term exposure level, and not following the requirements of OSHA's formaldehyde standard.

=== California safety and health investigation ===
California Attorney General Kamala Harris announced a settlement with GIB LLC dba Brazilian Blowout requiring a payment of $600,000 in fines and changes to Brazilian Blowout Acai Smoothing Solution and the Brazilian Blowout Professional Smoothing Solution MSDS and labeling. Under the terms of the settlement, GIB is required to:

- Produce a complete and accurate safety information sheet on the two products that includes a Proposition 65 cancer warning; distribute this information to recent product purchasers who may still have product on hand; and distribute it with all future product shipments. The revised safety information sheet will be posted on the company's web site.
- Affix "CAUTION" stickers to the bottles of the two products to inform stylists of the emission of formaldehyde gas and the need for precautionary measures, including adequate ventilation.
- Cease deceptive advertising of the products as formaldehyde-free and safe; engage in substantial corrective advertising, including honest communications to sales staff regarding product risks; and change numerous aspects of Brazilian Blowout's web site content.
- Retest the two products for total smog-forming chemicals (volatile organic compounds) at two Department of Justice-approved laboratories, and work with DOJ and the Air Resources Board to ensure that those products comply with state air quality regulations.
- Report the presence of formaldehyde in its products to the Safe Cosmetics Program at the Department of Public Health.
- Disclose refund policies to consumers before the products are purchased.
- Require proof of professional licensing before selling "salon use only" products to stylists.

== Health concerns ==
The U.S. Food and Drug Administration (FDA) warns that Brazilian Blowouts are hazardous to the health of those who use them and the hairdressers who apply them.

Concerns over the presence of formaldehyde in various hair smoothing products at significant concentrations centered whether methylene glycol could legally be synonymous with formaldehyde. Anhydrous formaldehyde gas readily dissolves in and reacts with water to form an equilibrium solution of methylene glycol. When heated, the equilibrium shifts and favors the production of formaldehyde and water. Thus, the manufacturer of Brazilian Blowout argued that methylene glycol is in their products, not formaldehyde, and therefore they can claim that their product was formaldehyde-free. The first involves nomenclature. The second issue is the method by which formaldehyde concentration is measured. The third involves measurements of formaldehyde concentration in bottles of the product in which the reported concentration is dependent upon both the method of measurement and nomenclature. However, the company reached a settlement with the state of California and is no longer claiming their products are formaldehyde free.

=== Nomenclature ===
The Chemical Abstracts Service (CAS) lists formaldehyde (50-00-0) and methylene glycol (463-57-0) as two different substances. The compounds have two different chemical structures, exist in two different chemical families and exhibit different physical properties. Formaldehyde is a colorless gas with chemical structure HCHO. Formaldehyde is a listed carcinogen. NTP notes methylene glycol as the primary chemical form of formaldehyde in water. When heat is applied in the Brazilian blowout process causes the methylene glycol to dehydrate, yielding formaldehyde gas and water vapours. According to Golden and Valentini even in worst case experiments less than half of the methylene glycol result in measurable formaldehyde gas, also an unknown portion of this measurement is due to the combining of the volatilised methylene glycol being reported as gaseous formaldehyde, furthermore the reverse reaction is much more rapid and much more favourable at STP equilibrium, which is not taken into account in the analysis. They contend that the chemical equivalence assumption is incorrect.

=== Method of concentration measurement ===
The Brazilian Blowout company (GIB LLC) has argued that Eastwood's lab and government labs in California and Oregon performed improper tests to determine formaldehyde concentration, arguing instead that an NMR spectroscopy test is superior.

=== Inclusion of methylene glycol as formaldehyde in reported measurements ===
Some manufacturers of products containing formaldehyde and methylene glycol have complained that the method of testing for formaldehyde—which does not distinguish between formaldehyde and methylene glycol—is not a reliable indicator of the toxicity of the product.

The American Chemistry Council issued an official statement, where they stated the following: "Formaldehyde content—in both gaseous and aqueous forms—should be accounted for when measuring the formaldehyde content of a product. ... Federal OSHA correctly defines formaldehyde as 'formaldehyde gas, its solutions, and materials that release formaldehyde.' This comprehensive standard is the cornerstone for the protection of people who work with and around formaldehyde." However the assumption of chemical and toxicological equivalence between Formaldehyde (a reactive gas) and methylene glycol (a stable reaction product that forms in an aqueous solution forming the main portion of formalin preparations) is disputed as a conservative assumption (mostly due to the methods of testing that are unable to differentiate the forms) instead of based on empirical toxicological data.

Performing air quality monitoring tests to detect the levels of formaldehyde gas in the air at the place of application can give an indication to the seriousness of the health problem the salon workers and customers are (sometimes involuntarily) exposed to.

=== Controversy regarding Oregon Occupational Safety and Health Division Advisory ===
In September 2010, the Center for Research on Occupational and Environmental Toxicology (CROET) received complaints of difficulty breathing, nose bleeds and eye irritation from stylists in one salon who claimed to have used one such hair treatment as directed. CROET, renamed the Oregon Institute of Occupational Health Sciences in 2014, requested consultative assistance from Oregon Occupational Safety and Health Division (OR-OSHA) to chemically analyze the hair straightening product. Oregon OSHA conducted air sampling in salons during this product's treatments. The 8-hour average exposures ranged from 0.006 parts per million (ppm) to 0.33, below the permissible exposure limit (PEL) of 0.75 ppm. The short term exposures ranged from 0.11ppm to 1.88 ppm, also below the short-term exposure limit of 2.0 ppm.

HPLC tests on batches of this product from three different Oregon hair salons allegedly determined that there were high levels of formaldehyde. Oregon OSHA subsequently broadened their warning to include other hair-smoothing products, particularly those described as "keratin-based", and said employers should take steps to protect their workers, while still relying on improper testing and nomenclature methods.

One manufacturer responded by issuing a statement to Good Morning America in which it accused Oregon Occupational Safety and Health Division of gross negligence because OSHA violated the proper testing protocol by using HPLC rather than using NMR spectroscopy and using incorrect nomenclature, thereby invalidating the findings. It subsequently filed a suit against Oregon OSHA. In the lawsuit, the manufacturer maintains that their products, when used as directed, fall well below the federally mandated action level (AL), permissible exposure limit (PEL), and short-term exposure limit (STEL) safety levels. They released their own material safety data sheet (MSDS), which have been disputed by several subsequent tests of their products by the FDA and OSHAs.

=== Aldehydes and related compounds ===
Several products contain other aldehydes and other derivative compounds that when heated to a temperature of 230 °C are chemically converted into formaldehyde as well as other toxic compounds.

=== Reported health effects ===
Adverse events have reported the following injuries associated with Brazilian Blowout: eye disorders (irritation, increased lacrimation, blurred vision, hyperaemia); nervous system disorders (headache, burning sensation, dizziness, syncope), and respiratory tract (dyspnea, cough, nasal discomfort, epistaxis, wheezing, rhinorrhea, throat irritation, nasopharyngitis). Other reported symptoms included nausea, hypotrichosis, chest pain, chest discomfort, emesis, and rash.

Formaldehyde has been classified as a carcinogen by the National Toxicology Program, and the Centers for Disease Control and Prevention issued a warning that fertility issues and miscarriage likelihood may increase when working with it.

=== Class action lawsuits ===
Girard Gibbs filed a class action lawsuit alleging that Brazilian Blowout violated California law by advertising its Brazilian Blowout hair straightening product as safe and formaldehyde-free, when it has been found to contain significant amounts of formaldehyde, as NTP defines a "known to be human carcinogen". Other companies have also filed class-action suits against producers of Brazilian Blowout treatments.

== Other studies ==
=== ChemRisk, LLC Study ===
In October 2011, the consulting firm ChemRisk, LLC published a study in the Journal of Occupational and Environmental Hygiene that also found that some hair-smoothing products, including some labeled formaldehyde-free, contain formaldehyde and could expose workers and customers to formaldehyde at levels above OSHA's short-term exposure limit (STEL). ChemRisk's tests showed that Brazilian Blowout Acai Professional Smoothing Solution contained 11.5% formaldehyde, Global Keratin Juvexin Optimized Functional Keratin contained 8.3% formaldehyde, and Coppola Keratin Complex Blonde Formula contained 3% formaldehyde. Of these, only Global Keratin lists formaldehyde on its label. However, the Global Keratin label indicated it contained less than 4% formaldehyde, less than half of what was found in the product during testing. ChemRisk also tested the air while a stylist performed a simulated treatment process using each product. Formaldehyde was found in the air during all three simulations. During the simulation with Brazilian Blowout Acai Professional Smoothing Solution, formaldehyde levels were above OSHA's 15-minute STEL during blow drying.

=== U.S. Food and Drug Administration report ===
The Food and Drug Administration (FDA) announced on October 8, 2010, that it "was working with state and local organizations, as well as OSHA, to determine whether the products or ingredients would be likely to cause health problems under the intended conditions of use. The composition of the products and the labeling, including use instructions and any warning statements, will be factors in this determination. One safety issue we’ll be evaluating is whether formaldehyde may be released into the air after the product is applied to the hair and heated."

On August 22, 2011, the FDA issued its first warning letter to this same manufacturer, telling the company to stop labeling its products as formaldehyde-free, which it considers misleading, and stating that its products are "misbranded" and "adulterated".

The manufacturer responded with a ten-page letter to the FDA, challenging the FDA's assertions that the product was not adulterated because it did not contain formaldehyde, but methylene glycol, and that the FDA was also relying on incorrect nomenclature methods. Therefore, the product was not misbranded because it was, in fact, formaldehyde-free. However, the company voluntarily altered its label to remove the claim that the product was formaldehyde-free, saying it "is committed to ensuring that its products comply with all applicable legal and regulatory standards and seeks to partner with the FDA to achieve this result".
