= Lifestyle management programme =

A lifestyle management programme (also referred to as a health promotion programme, health behaviour change programme, lifestyle improvement programme or wellness programme) is an intervention designed to promote positive lifestyle and behaviour change and is widely used in the field of health promotion.

In extreme cases, such a programme may involve or follow up upon a residential component, especially at the outset, to establish the initial foundation of behavioural change.

== Definition ==
Lifestyle management programmes are closely linked to the concept of health promotion, which is "the process of enabling people to increase control over, and to improve, their health."

Based on this, a lifestyle management programme is defined as a structured, action-oriented health promotion initiative designed to help individuals improve their health, reduce health risks and promote healthy behaviours.

Lifestyle management programmes can target a range of different health concerns and areas, such as physical activity, stress, smoking, and nutrition. They are used in a variety of different settings, however most commonly in workplaces and community or public health initiatives.

== Implementation ==
Lifestyle management programmes can be delivered as a standalone initiative, however they are generally used as part of an integrated, multi-component health promotion programme, incorporating a range of interventions. A health risk assessment or appraisal is often used as a starting point to identify health risks and then target appropriate programmes based on the results.

They can be delivered through a variety of mediums, including online, face-to-face with a health coach or trainer, or telephonically.

== Benefits ==
Reviews and academic studies exploring the effectiveness and impact of lifestyle management programmes, when used as part of a wider, multi-component health promotion programme, have found that they can:

- Reduce health risks
- Reduce medical and healthcare costs
- Improve productivity
- Reduce absenteeism
- Reduce the incidence and severity of chronic health conditions.

== Providers ==
There are a number of different providers offering lifestyle management programmes, including vielife, Staywell, Healthways, CIGNA and LifeMojo. There are also organisations which offer related treatments and therapies which support these programmes. Typically these cover Yoga, Tai Chi or meditation. As an example - Re-Vitalise retreats in the UK offer combined Tai Chi and meditation focussing on the health benefits and de-stressing aspects of these arts

== See also ==
- Health promotion
- Total Worker Health
- Workplace health promotion
- Workplace wellness
