= Total Worker Health =

Management strategy for worker wellbeing

Total Worker Health is a trademarked strategy defined as policies, programs, and practices that integrate protection from work-related safety and health hazards with promotion of injury and illness prevention efforts to advance worker well-being. It was conceived and is funded by the National Institute for Occupational Safety and Health (NIOSH). Total Worker Health is tested and developed in six Centers of Excellence for Total Worker Health in the United States.

== Definition ==
Total Worker Health (TWH) is defined as policies, programs, and practices that integrate protection from work-related safety and health hazards with promotion of injury and illness prevention efforts to advance worker well-being.

Traditional occupational safety and health protection programs have primarily focused on ensuring that work is safe and that workers are protected from the harms that arise from work itself. TWH builds on this approach through the recognition that work is a social determinant of health. Job-related factors such as wages, hours of work, workload and stress levels, interactions with coworkers, and access to leave and healthful workplaces all can have an important impact on the well-being of workers, their families, and their communities. TWH explores opportunities to not only protect workers, but also advance their health and well-being by targeting the conditions of work. Scientific evidence now supports what many safety and health professionals, as well as workers themselves, have long suspected—that risk factors in the workplace can contribute to health problems previously considered unrelated to work. For example, there are work-related risk factors for abnormal weight fluctuations, sleep disorders, cardiovascular disease, depression, and other health conditions. In recognition of these emerging relationships, the TWH approach focuses on how environmental, workplace factors can both mitigate and enhance overall worker health beyond traditional occupational safety and health concerns.

The five Defining Elements of TWH are:

- Defining Element of TWH 1: Demonstrate leadership commitment to worker safety and health at all levels of the organization.
- Defining Element of TWH 2: Design work to eliminate or reduce safety and health hazards and promote worker well-being.
- Defining Element of TWH 3: Promote and support worker engagement throughout program design and implementation.
- Defining Element of TWH 4: Ensure confidentiality and privacy of workers.
- Defining Element of TWH 5: Integrate relevant systems to advance worker well-being.

=== Hierarchy of controls applied to Total Worker Health ===
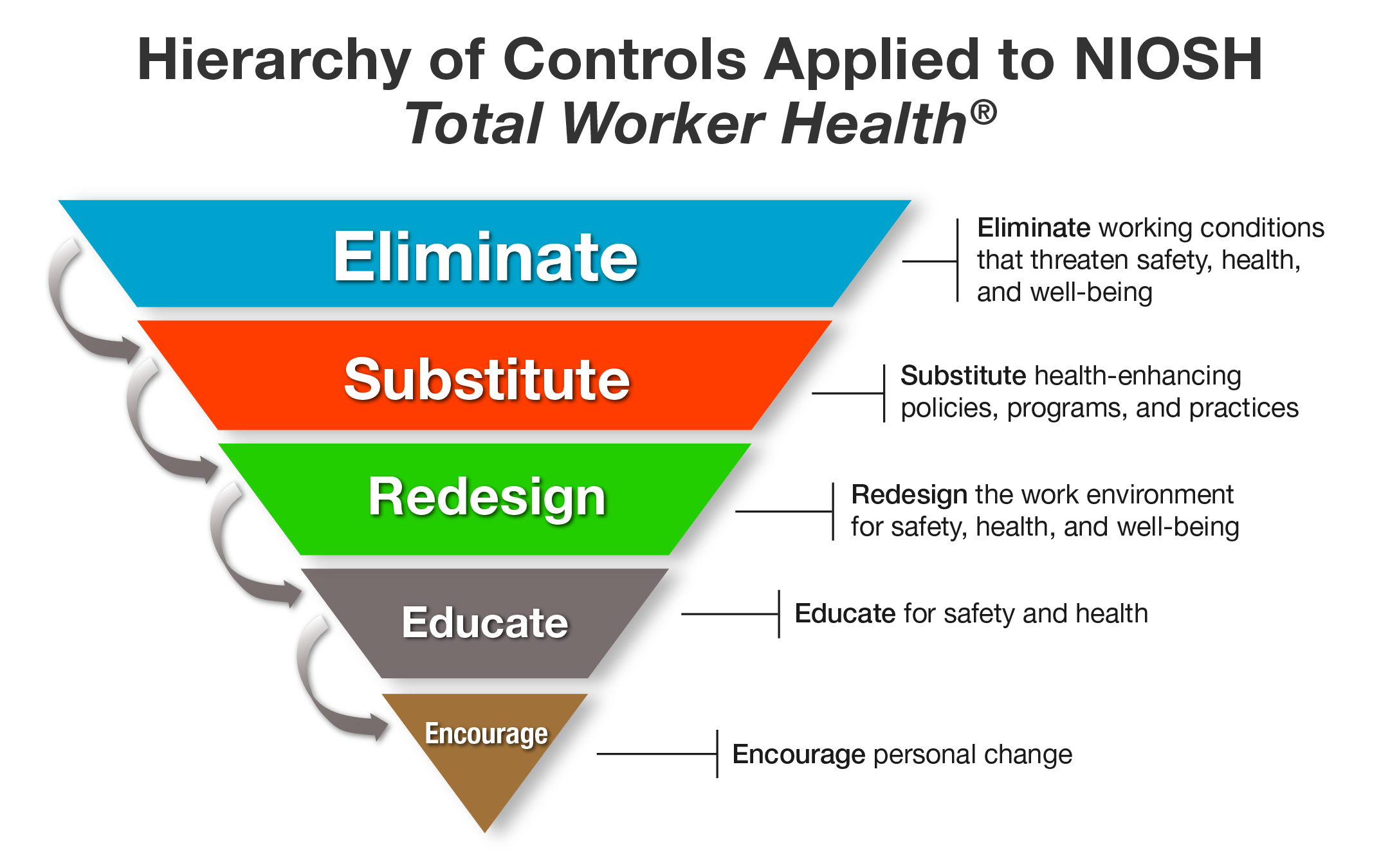
Hierarchy of Controls Applied to Total Worker Health developed by the National Institute for Occupational Safety and Health

The Hierarchy of Controls Applied to NIOSH Total Worker Health is a conceptual model for prioritizing efforts to advance the safety, health, and well-being of all workers. This model applies the framework of Total Worker Health approaches to the traditional Hierarchy of Controls used in occupational safety and health. Like the traditional Hierarchy of Controls, strategies are presented in order of expected effectiveness, from top to bottom.

1. The first strategy is "Eliminate workplace conditions that threaten worker safety, health, and well-being."
2. The second strategy is "Substitute health-enhancing policies, programs, and practices." This suggests replacing unsafe, unhealthy working conditions with policies, programs, and management practices that improve the culture of safety and health in the workplace.
3. The third strategy is "Redesign the work environment for safety, health, and well-being."
4. The fourth strategy is "Educate for safety and health." This suggests providing safety and health education and resources to enhance individual knowledge for all workers.
5. The fifth strategy is "Encourage personal change."

The hierarchy suggests that eliminating or reducing recognized hazards in the workplace is the most effective means of prevention. However, hazards that are difficult or impossible to eliminate can be managed through engineering, administrative, or individual-level interventions. Based on this hierarchy, workplace programs using a TWH approach may emphasize elimination or control of workplace safety and health hazards as the primary goal.

=== Issues ===
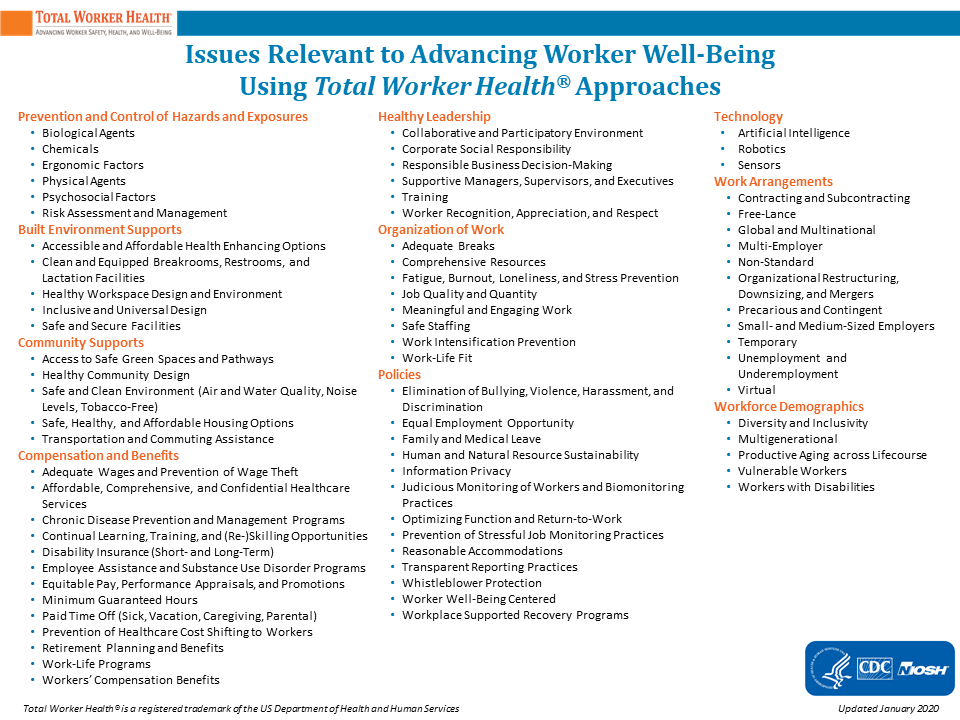
Issues Relevant to Advancing Worker Well-Being Through Total Worker Health

The accompanying graphic, “Issues Relevant to Advancing Worker Well-Being Using Total Worker Health Approaches” illustrates a wide-ranging list of issues that are relevant to advancing worker safety, health, and well-being. Revised in January 2020, this list reflects an expanded focus for TWH that recognizes workplace and work issues such as innovative technologies, working conditions, and emerging forms of employment that present new risks for today’s and tomorrow’s workforce. Additionally, this expanded focus recognizes that there are linkages between health conditions that may not arise from work but that can be adversely affected by work. Understanding, preventing, and reducing these risks are important elements of TWH. A TWH approach advocates for the integration of all organizational policies, programs, and practices that contribute to worker safety, health and well-being, including those relevant to the prevention and control of hazards and exposures, built environment supports, community supports, compensation and benefits, healthy leadership, organization of work, policies, technology, work arrangements, and workforce demographics.

== History ==
=== Background ===
Total Worker Health originated from the Steps to a Healthier US Workforce symposium in October 2004, which sought to bring together knowledge and experience of health protection and health promotion, in order to stimulate action for the development of programs. The symposium developed around themes of research, practice and policy related to the integration of health protection and health promotion.

By 2005, the initiative was redeveloped from the Steps to a Healthier US Workforce Symposium and renamed the NIOSH WorkLife Initiative. The WorkLife Initiative supported addressing worker health and well-being in a novel way, by addressing the physical and organizational work environment concurrently with personal health decisions and behaviors of individuals. In September 2007, NIOSH and 35 other sponsors conducted the "WorkLife 2007: Protecting and Promoting Worker Health" symposium. Collaborators at the symposium, which included leaders from labor, business and academic communities provided evidence of work and health benefits from integrated approaches, case studies, and anecdotal reports. The overall consensus was that such integrated work-based programs, if executed and sustained properly, can be good for worker health and business.

In 2008, collaborators at NIOSH and the Centers of Excellence developed 10 recommendations, grouped in practice, research and policy, as a long-range strategy for advancing the WorkLife Initiative. These recommendations were based on evidence-based practice and research-to-practice initiatives. In 2011, a collaborative symposium with other federal agencies culminated in the "Healthier Federal Workers 2011 Symposium", which applied the integrated work health approaches to federal employees.

=== Expansion ===
In 2011, NIOSH WorkLife became "Total Worker Health" to better convey the more comprehensive approach to workplace prevention. The year 2012 marked the publication of The Research Compendium: The NIOSH Total Worker Health Program: Seminal Research Papers 2012 presenting the rationale for the TWH approach. These papers noted that a small, but growing body of evidence suggests that integrating occupational safety and health protection program activities with other workplace policies, programs, and practices is more effective for safeguarding worker safety, health, and well-being than either of these programmatic activities on their own. In 2014, NIOSH created the Office for TWH Coordination and Research Support (Office for TWH) to coordinate and advance these extramural and intramural efforts.

The 1st International Symposium to Advance Total Worker Health was first held October 6–8, 2014 at the National Institutes of Health Natcher Center. The year 2015 marked developments for the program and Office, including the U.S. Patent and Trademark Office’s granting of the mark “Total Worker Health” as an official registered trademark of the U.S. Department of Health and Human Services; the launch of the first Center within TWH, the National Center for Productive Aging and Work; and a NIH-cohosted Pathways to Prevention Workshop titled: “Total Worker Health—What’s Work Got to Do with It?”.

In 2016, the NIOSH Office for Total Worker Health released a National Occupational Research Agenda (NORA) National Total Worker Health Agenda to define and prioritize activities for 2016–2026, and published Fundamentals of Total Worker Health Approaches: Essential Elements for Advancing Worker Safety, Health, and Well-being. That same year, NIOSH funded six Centers of Excellence to conduct research on the concepts of Total Worker Health. In 2017, three universities launched certificate programs for TWH. In 2018, the National Institute for Occupational Safety and Health hosted the 2nd International Symposium to Advance Total Worker Health. The year 2019 marked the first TWH publication, Edited Volume on Total Worker Health.

== NIOSH programs ==
NIOSH has funded ten Centers of Excellence for Total Worker Health in the United States to explore and research concepts of TWH, such as pilot testing policies and programs, building a scientific evidence base developing new solutions, developing and disseminating best practices and tool kits, developing strategies for overcoming barriers to organizational adoption, and applying physiological and biological markers of stress, sleep, and depression. The ten NIOSH Centers of Excellence for Total Worker Health are at the University of California San Francisco, University of Colorado School of Public Health, University of Massachusetts Lowell and University of Connecticut jointly, Harvard-T.H. Chan School of Public Health, University of Iowa, Johns Hopkins University, Oregon Institute of Occupational Health Science, University of Illinois-Chicago, University of North Carolina at Chapel Hill, and University of Utah School of Medicine.

NIOSH also runs the Total Worker Health Affiliate Program to foster an integrated approach to protecting and promoting worker well-being through collaborations with academic, labor, nonprofit, and government organizations.

== Research ==
=== National Total Worker Health Agenda ===
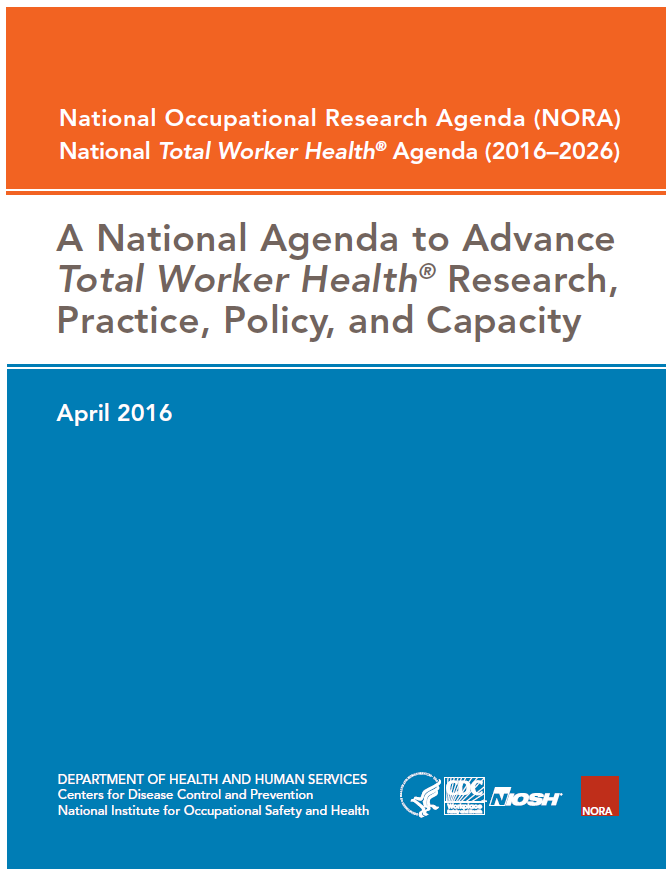
National Total Worker Health Agenda

In 2016, the NIOSH Office for Total Worker Health released a National Occupational Research Agenda (NORA) National Total Worker Health Agenda to define and prioritize occupational safety and health research, practice, and prevention activities for 2016–2026. The Agenda, representing the first time a TWH-specific NORA has been created, builds on an earlier draft released in September 2014.

NIOSH invited stakeholders to provide comment on this draft agenda. In 2015, in response to stakeholder input received, the TWH definition was expanded and the TWH approach was more finely focused in the final Agenda. The refined description better reflects the priorities of the program, and helps to overcome the equating of TWH with traditional workplace wellness programs that do not integrate worker protection elements. TWH continues to place priority upon a hazard-free work environment that protects the safety and health of all workers.

=== Sit-stand workstations ===
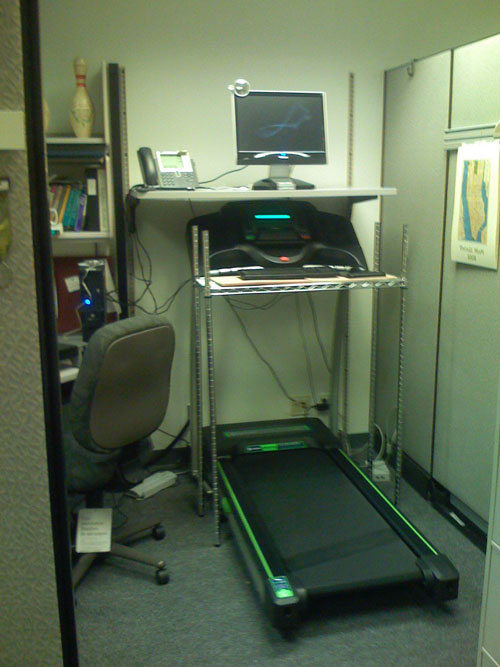
Pilot studies of sit-stand workstations have shown reductions in sedentary time and possible indications of improved health outcomes.

Concerns over the increasingly sedentary lifestyle of individuals and the associated health risks lead to this development. A study from a large sample of Australian adults found that prolonged sitting was a risk factor for all-cause mortality, independent of physical activity. Sit-stand workstations are custom-built computer workstations, allowing the user to adjust the height of the workplace envelope and to work while standing. With the implementation of sit-stand workstations, individuals will be able to reduce sedentary time while at work, thereby improving health outcomes, and possibly improving work productivity.

Published research in 2012 on the benefits from implementing sit-stand workstations in the workplace has resulted in the development of some pilot studies for Total Worker Health. While the individual results of the studies varied, the researchers found that sit-stand workstations resulted in an overall improvement in health outcomes of workers who switched to these workstations, in addition to the reduced sitting time. Such health benefits from these pilot studies include increased HDL cholesterol, improved mood outcomes, reduced eye strain, and reduced upper back, neck and shoulder pain. Robertson et al. found that the sit-stand workstation users, who were trained to vary their postures at work, exhibited increased productivity at work, compared to those who were not trained so. Further, the study by Pronk et al. showed decreased fatigue and increased vigor among participants. With these findings, NIOSH has begun a pilot program among employees for the Total Worker Health initiative.

=== Health care workers ===
Several studies out of the Harvard Center for Work, Health and Wellbeing have focused on the relationships between work context and quality of life measures for health care workers. A survey of over 1500 hospital patient care workers examined the relationships between health outcomes (lower back pain, inadequate physical activity, and sleep deprivation) and work context measures. Inadequate physical activity and sleep deficiency were associated, while lower back pain was not significantly related to either stressor. Work context measures, such as low supervisor support, harassment at work, job title, and job culture were found to be associated with the quality of life and health outcomes for the hospital care workers.

=== Aging workforce ===
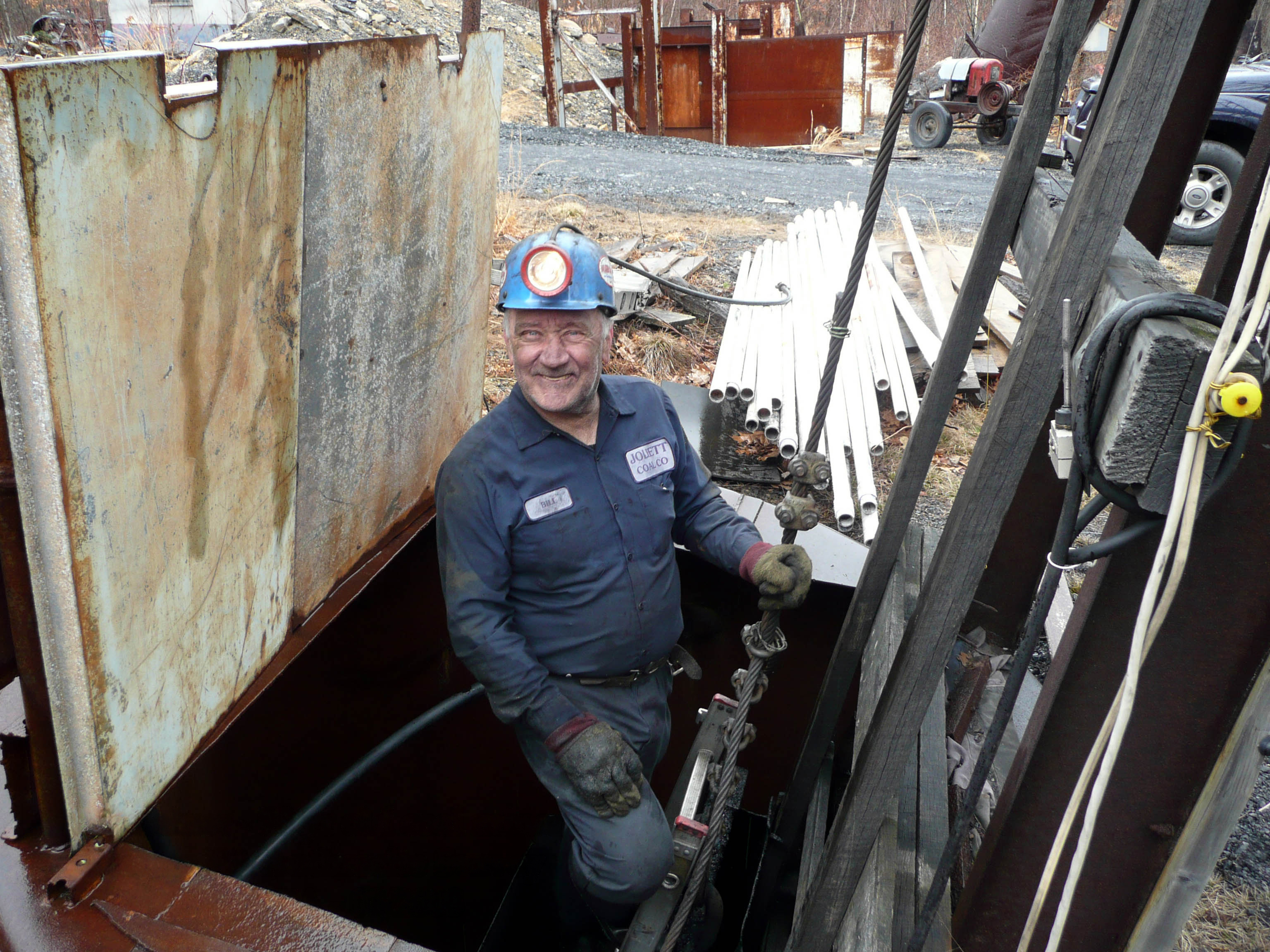
Seventy-year-old miner emerging from his coal mine in eastern Pennsylvania.

Aging in the American workforce, the rapidly increasing numbers of older workers (ages 55 and above) comprising the workforce in the United States, could have significant impacts to the economy, social security benefits, occupational safety and health, health care, and American society as a whole. Researchers from the American College of Occupational and Environmental Medicine (ACOEM) and NIOSH convened a national Invitational Summit on ‘’Advancing Workplace Health Protection and Promotion in the Context of an Aging Workforce’’ to address several questions and to develop consensus statements and recommendations for a national approach to tackle these issues. These issues included why employers should care about aging in the workplace, how to establish best practices to maximize health and productivity of aging workers, how organizational structures can better approach aging in the workplace, what are the barriers to integrating health protection and promotion programs for aging workers, and what tools, programs, and resources exist to overcome the barriers. Some of the consensus statements conceived during this summit include creating a “culture of health” throughout the workplace, creating “age-friendly” programs and policies, increasing the use of incentives to impact change, integrating workforce health as a standard business measures, conducting new research and models to analyze data, and creating a new culture of “shared accountability.”

== Implementation ==
Various companies have implemented integrated health protection and health promotion management programs successfully, with documented health improvements and cost savings. Each integrated program varies a bit in focus areas and in implementation, but follow the components of Total Worker Health. Examples of companies that have yielded successful results from their programs include Caterpillar, FedEx, Dow Chemical and Perdue Farms.

== See also ==
- Health promotion
- Lifestyle management programme
- Occupational health psychology
- Occupational Health Science (journal)
- Occupational hygiene
- Occupational safety and health
- Participatory ergonomics
- Prevention through design
- Workplace health promotion
- Workplace wellness
