= Heptylparaben =

Chemical compound

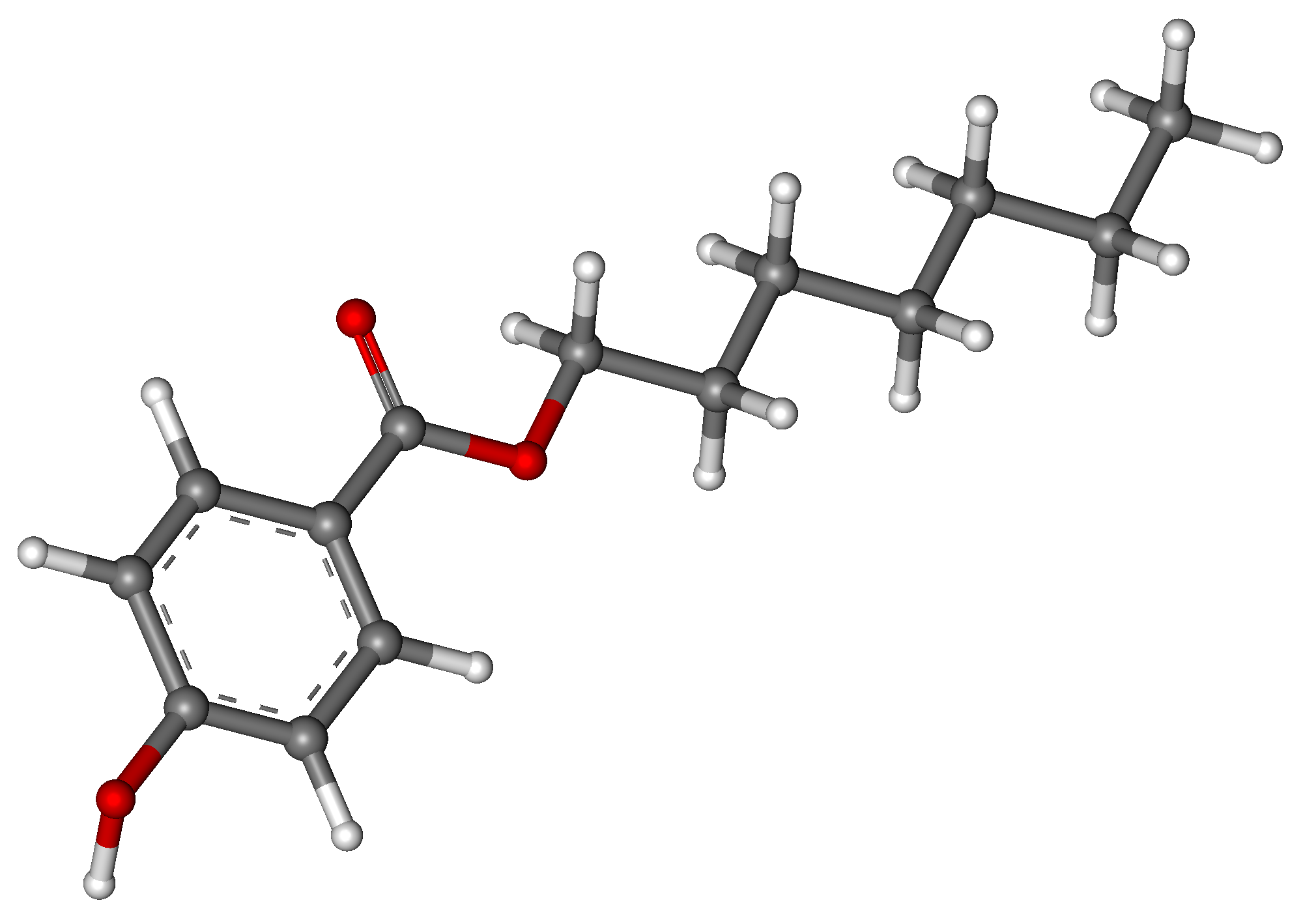

Names
- Preferred IUPAC name Heptyl 4-hydroxybenzoate
- Other names: Heptyl p-hydroxybenzoate; Heptyl paraben; Heptylparaben; Nipaheptyl; n-Heptyl 4-hydroxybenzoate; n-Heptyl p-hydroxybenzoate; Heptyl para-hydroxybenzoate; E209

Identifiers
CAS Number	1085-12-7
3D model (JSmol)	Interactive image
ChemSpider	13515
ECHA InfoCard	100.012.832
PubChem CID	14138
UNII	K2CIJ448IX
CompTox Dashboard (EPA)	DTXSID4022523
- InChI: InChI=1S/C14H20O3/c1-2-3-4-5-6-11-17-14(16)12-7-9-13(15)10-8-12/h7-10,15H,2-6,11H2,1H3 Key: ZTJORNVITHUQJA-UHFFFAOYSA-N
- SMILES: O=C(OCCCCCCC)c1ccc(O)cc1

Properties
Chemical formula	C_{14}H_{20}O_{3}
Molar mass	236.311 g·mol^{−1}
- Except where otherwise noted, data are given for materials in their standard state (at 25 °C [77 °F], 100 kPa). verify (what is ?) Infobox references

Heptylparaben (heptyl p-hydroxybenzoate) is a compound with formula C_{7}H_{15}(C_{6}H_{4}OHCOO). It is a paraben which is the heptyl ester of p-hydroxybenzoic acid.

Heptylparaben has also been found to be produced in some microorganisms including Microbulbifer.

As a food additive it has E number E209, and is used as a preservative.
