= Propylparaben =

Chemical compound

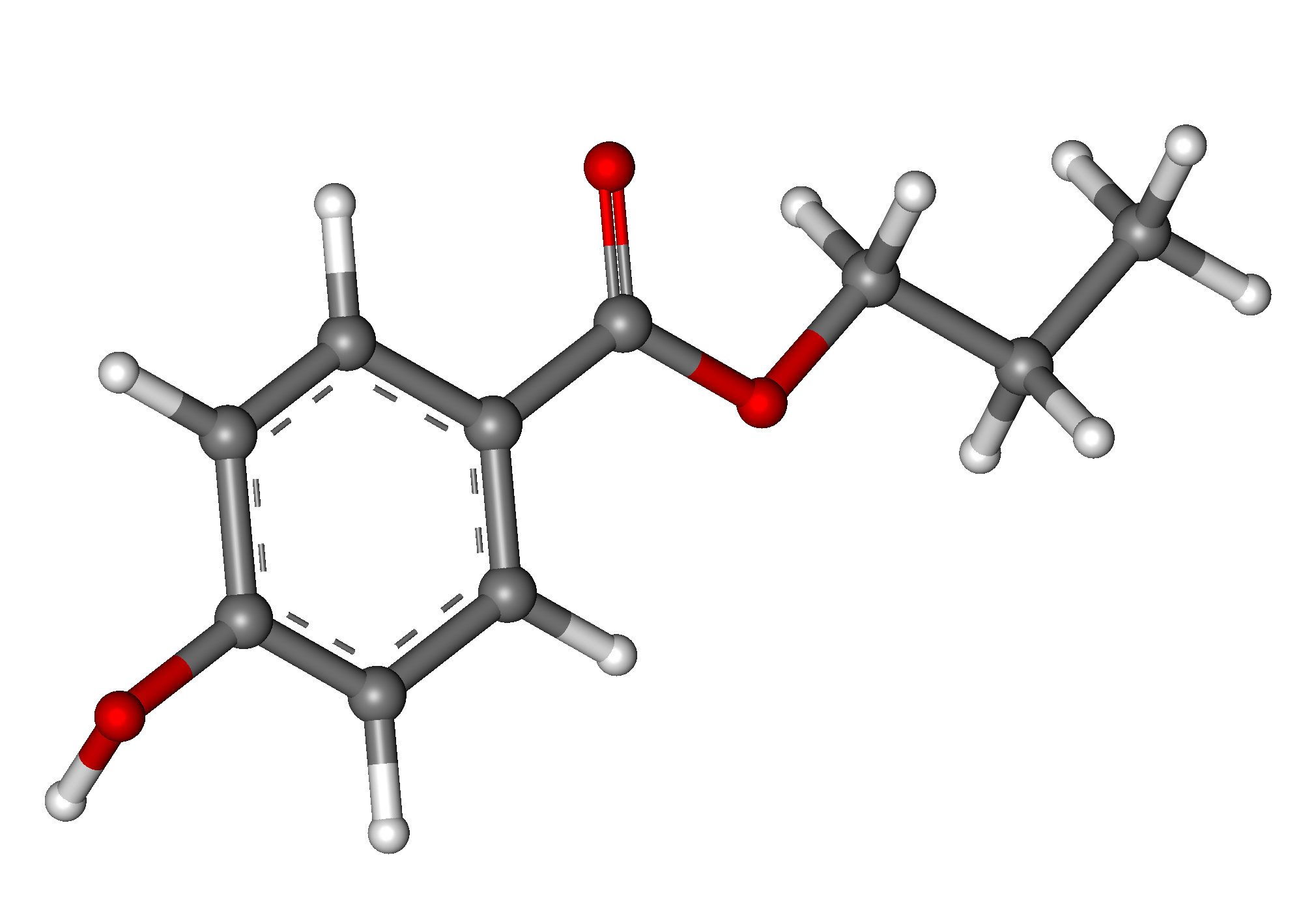

Names
- Preferred IUPAC name Propyl 4-hydroxybenzoate
- Other names: Propyl paraben; Propyl p-hydroxybenzoate; Propyl parahydroxybenzoate; Nipasol; E216

Identifiers
CAS Number	94-13-3
3D model (JSmol)	Interactive image
ChEBI	CHEBI:32063
ChEMBL	ChEMBL194014
ChemSpider	6907
ECHA InfoCard	100.002.098
EC Number	202-307-7
E number	E216 (preservatives)
KEGG	D01422
PubChem CID	7175
UNII	Z8IX2SC1OH
CompTox Dashboard (EPA)	DTXSID4022527
- InChI: InChI=1S/C10H12O3/c1-2-7-13-10(12)8-3-5-9(11)6-4-8/h3-6,11H,2,7H2,1H3 Key: QELSKZZBTMNZEB-UHFFFAOYSA-N; InChI=1/C10H12O3/c1-2-7-13-10(12)8-3-5-9(11)6-4-8/h3-6,11H,2,7H2,1H3 Key: QELSKZZBTMNZEB-UHFFFAOYAD
- SMILES: O=C(OCCC)c1ccc(O)cc1

Properties
Chemical formula	C_{10}H_{12}O_{3}
Molar mass	180.203 g·mol^{−1}
Density	1.0630 g/cm^{3}
Melting point	96 to 99 °C (205 to 210 °F; 369 to 372 K)

Hazards
NFPA 704 (fire diamond)	2 1 0

Related compounds
Related compounds	Paraben; Butylparaben; Ethylparaben; Methylparaben; Heptylparaben
- Except where otherwise noted, data are given for materials in their standard state (at 25 °C [77 °F], 100 kPa). verify (what is ?) Infobox references

Propylparaben (also spelled propyl paraben) is the n-propyl ester of p-hydroxybenzoic acid. It occurs as a natural substance found in many plants and some insects. Additionally, it can be manufactured synthetically for use in cosmetics, pharmaceuticals, and foods. It is a member of the class of parabens and can be used as a preservative in many water-based cosmetics, such as creams, lotions, shampoos, and bath products. As a food additive, it has the E number E216.

Sodium propyl p-hydroxybenzoate, the sodium salt of propylparaben, a compound with formula Na(C_{3}H_{7}(C_{6}H_{4}COO)O), is used similarly as a food additive and as an anti-fungal preservation agent. Its E number is E217.

In 2010, the European Union Scientific Committee on Consumer Safety stated that the use of butylparaben and propylparaben as preservatives in finished cosmetic products is safe to the consumer, as long as the sum of their concentrations does not exceed 0.19%.

== Applications ==
=== Food ===
Under FDA regulations, propylparaben is safe to use with a maximum of 0.1% of the weight of the finished food or 200–450 ppm for a variety of foods like coffee extracts, juices, jams, baked goods, and dairy products. It is found naturally in a plant called Stocksia brahuica. It is often used as a food and cosmetic preservative as it has no odor or taste, and does not change the texture. The compound has some medicinal application as well as it has been used in pills, syrups, eyewashes, weight gain drinks, and recently has been discovered to have anticonvulsant activities suggesting it may be useful in the development of anticonvulsant medicine.

A study of combining plasma-activated water (PAW) with propylparaben shows increased antimicrobial efficacy of PAW for fresh produce sanitation. PAW is used for fresh produce sanitation. However, when used in food applications, its effectiveness decreased because of interfering substances like polysaccharides, proteins, and lipids. With propylparaben and PAW, bacteria undergo more oxidative stress and cell damage, increasing preservation of produce. For now, the potential health risk and residue level of propylparaben with this new method is still unknown.

Propylparaben is also used as a food additive, and is designated with the E number E216. Propylparaben is commonly used as a preservative in packaged baked goods, particularly pastries and tortillas. Propylparaben is also a Standardized Chemical Allergen and is used in allergenic testing.

=== Cosmetic ===
Propylparaben is one of the most commonly used paraben in cosmetic formulation. It can be found in moisturizers, shampoos, conditioners, makeups, shaving products, and many more. In cosmetic products, propylparaben is typically combined with other parabens (such as methylparaben) or other preservatives to protect against a broader range of microorganisms. The chemical stability in room temperature and wide pH range (4.5–7.5) is advantageous to prolong a product shelf life. Under FDA regulations, the maximum use of concentration for propylparaben is 25%. The European Commission has established a maximum concentration of 0.14% for propyl paraben when used alone and 0.8% for total parabens in cosmetic products. However, cosmetics do not require testing by the FDA prior to sale. While there is no conclusive evidence of harm to human health from propylparaben, more cosmetic companies are creating paraben-free lines, specifically in shampoos. Since parabens can easily absorb through skin, daily use is believed to cause toxic accumulation in the body that might be harmful. Some people may also experience allergic reaction to parabens including redness, irritation, itchiness, flaking, and hives.

=== Pharmaceutical ===
Used since the mid-1920s as a preservative, parabens are present in eyewashes, pills, cough syrups, injectable solutions, contraceptives, and even weight-gain drinks. Unlike cosmetics where propylparaben is mostly used in the surface, propylparaben is ingested and absorbed. According to a law from the EEC (European Economic Community), the maximum level of parabens in pharmaceutical products is 1% (w/w), much stricter and defined than cosmetics. Propylparaben also cannot be used alone in ophthalmic products such as eyewash, because it may cause irritation at the effective concentration level to have antimicrobial activities.

A MES (Maximal Electroshock) test also shows anticonvulsant activity in propylparaben. Since propylparaben has minimum to no toxicity and well absorbed in the GI tract, it can potentially be develop to new anticonvulsant medicine to control seizures.

== Chemical properties ==
Propylparaben is a stable and non-volatile compound with antimicrobial properties and has been used as preservatives in food for over 50 years. It is typically used in a variety of water-based cosmetics and personal-care products. it is a white crystalline solid with a molecular weight of 202.18 amu. Humans most often absorb the chemical through their skin or ingestion as it is in many cosmetic and food products as an antifungal preservative. It is metabolized in two major pathways leading to the production of either conjugated metabolites or hydrolysates (PHBA, PHHA). These products are excreted from the body in urine. Propylparaben is an effective antimicrobial, especially against green and blue molds on citrus fruits. Its high solubility in water allows it to be applied to the fruits easily.

== Synthesis ==
One of the simplest ways to produce propylparaben is through the esterification of 4-hydroxy benzoic acid with propanol using an acidic catalyst. The first major step includes the protonation of the carbonyl due to the acidic conditions. This protonation results in a positive charge on the carbonyl which will offset the electron density from the ester carbon atom, this allows the propanol to preform a nucleophilic attack on the carbonyl. The proton of the nucleophilic propanol is then transferred by the solvent to the esters hydroxyl group. The hydroxyl can then act as a good leaving group and be expelled from the tetrahedral intermediate as water, allowing the ester carbonyl group to reform. Finally, deprotonation of the reformed carbonyl group will produce the final ester product, propylparaben.

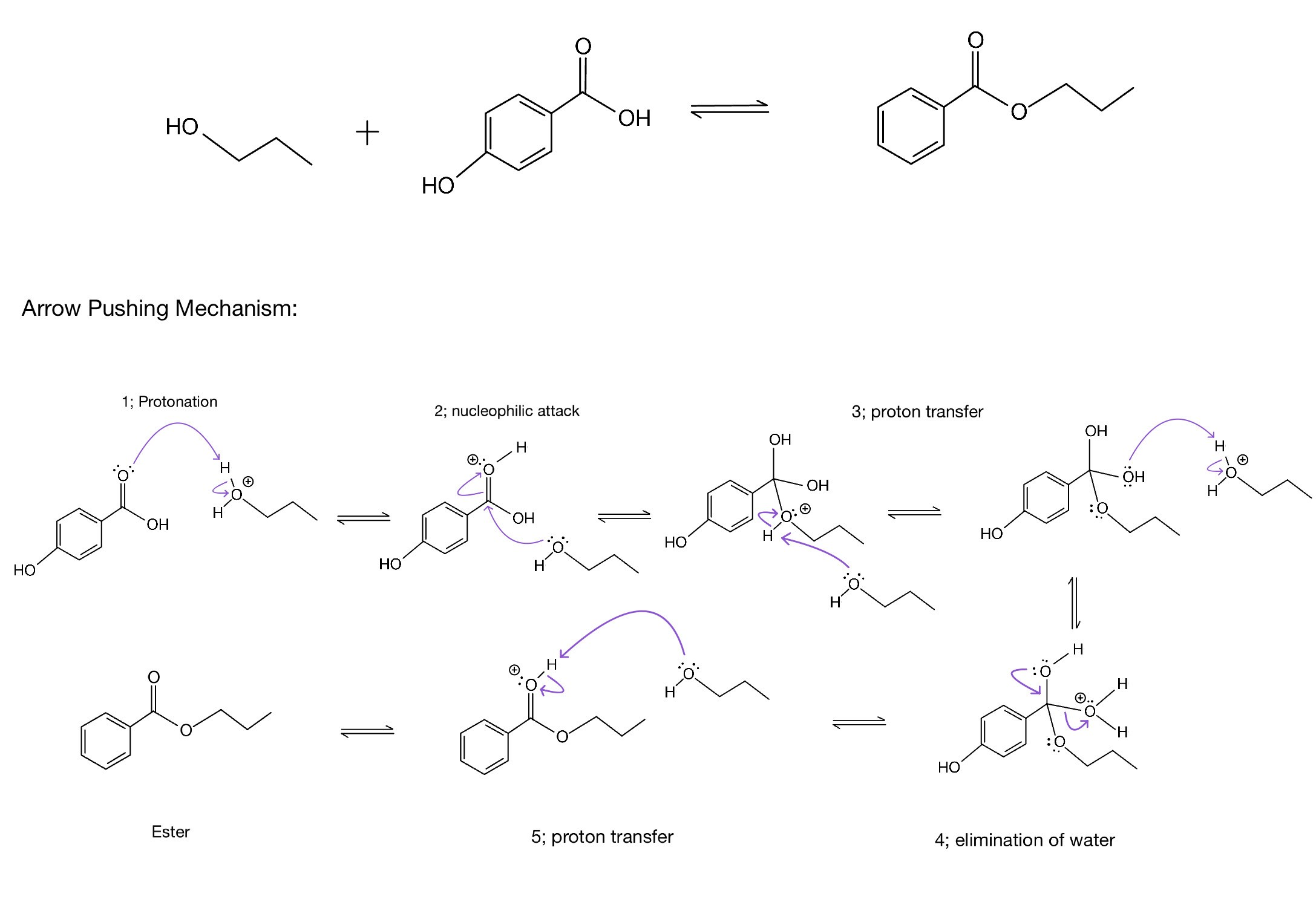
Synthesis of Propyl Paraben by Esterification.

== Safety ==
Studies on propylparaben, among other parabens, have been raising concerns on possible interaction with and disruption of estrogen in the endocrine system. Exposure to high levels of propylparaben has been correlated to lower sperm and testosterone production in males in animal studies, with one study showing that it can act as an spermicide. Animal studies of propylparaben in the body show that propylparaben is metabolized from the GI tract and excreted rapidly through urine with no accumulation in the body. On cracked or damaged skin, the use of propylparaben in cosmetics or skincare can result in skin sensitization, but for normal skin it is considered safe.

As of May 2023, New York was considering banning the use of propylparaben because of potential activity as an endocrine disruptor.

In October 2023, the Governor of California signed a bill into law outlawing the use of propylparaben in foods by 2027. The new law bans the manufacture, sale, and distribution of propylparaben and three other additives (brominated vegetable oil, potassium bromate, and Red 3), although it is not related to the endocrine disrupting effects. This is the first law in the U.S. to ban it.
