= Vielife =

British health product provider

vielife
- Type: Limited company
- Industry: Health and well-being
- Founded: 1989
- Headquarters: London
- Key people: Mike Beason (Managing Director)
- Products: Health risk assessment, lifestyle management programmes, EAP
- Parent: CIGNA
- Website: www.vielife.com

Vielife, stylized as vielife, is a provider of health products mainly focusing on sleep, nutrition and physical health.

== History ==
Vielife provides on-site health assessments, personalized reports and coaching, and lifestyle management services to help organizations monitor and improve the health and well-being of their people. Vielife started as part of the Institute of Biomedical Sports et Vie (IBSV), which was set up in France in 1989 by Dr. Francois Duforez. Bertrand Faure Beaulieu acquired a majority stake in 1998 and Vielife was launched in London in 2000.

In 2006, Vielife acquired Business health UK Ltd, a UK-based health and wellbeing consultancy. Later that year Vielife was acquired by the international insurance provider, CIGNA; following the acquisition, Vielife continues to operate as an independent, stand-alone business.

== Research ==
Vielife has done research into the effect of health promotion on employee health risks and works productivity; the development of a corporate health risk measurement tool; and the effect of office lighting on employee well-being and work performance.

== Awards ==
In 2010, Vielife was awarded certification from the National Committee for Quality Assurance (NCQA) for its health improvement products. The Vielife Health Risk Assessment received a two-year re-certification and a new two-year certification was awarded for its Self Management Tools.
