= Methylparaben =

Chemical compound

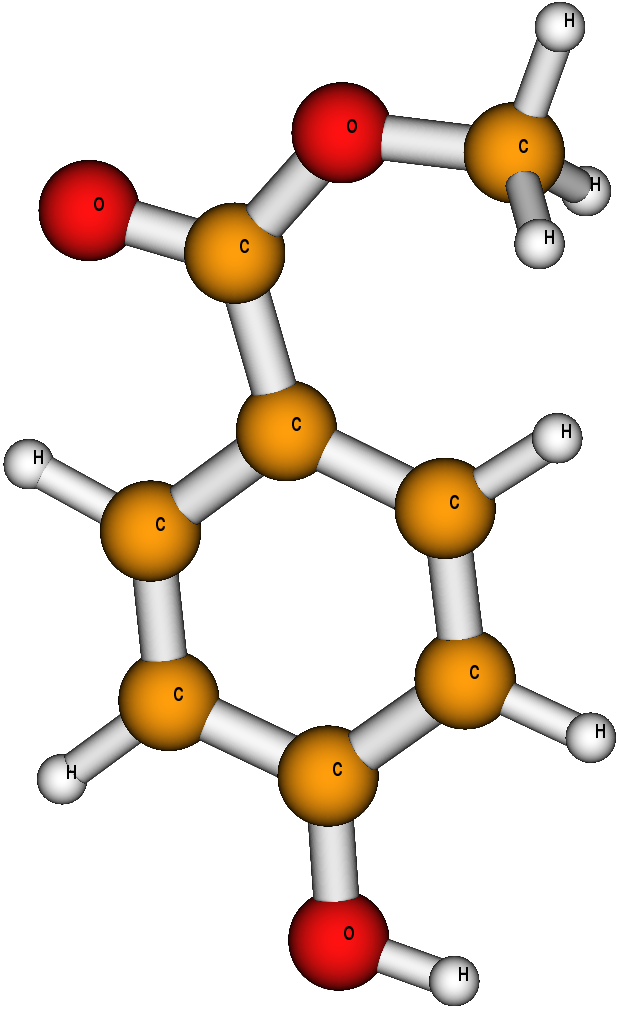

Names
- Preferred IUPAC name Methyl 4-hydroxybenzoate
- Other names: Methyl paraben; Methyl p-hydroxybenzoate; Methyl parahydroxybenzoate; Nipagin M; E number E218; Tegosept; Mycocten

Identifiers
CAS Number	99-76-3
3D model (JSmol)	Interactive image
ChEBI	CHEBI:31835
ChEMBL	ChEMBL325372
ChemSpider	7176
ECHA InfoCard	100.002.532
E number	E218 (preservatives)
IUPHAR/BPS	6273
KEGG	D01400
PubChem CID	7456
UNII	A2I8C7HI9T
CompTox Dashboard (EPA)	DTXSID4022529
- InChI: InChI=1S/C8H8O3/c1-11-8(10)6-2-4-7(9)5-3-6/h2-5,9H,1H3 Key: LXCFILQKKLGQFO-UHFFFAOYSA-N; InChI=1/C8H8O3/c1-11-8(10)6-2-4-7(9)5-3-6/h2-5,9H,1H3 Key: LXCFILQKKLGQFO-UHFFFAOYAH
- SMILES: COC(=O)c1ccc(O)cc1

Properties
Chemical formula	C_{8}H_{8}O_{3}
Molar mass	152.149 g·mol^{−1}
Appearance	Colorless crystals or white crystalline powder
Density	1.383 g/cm^{3}
Melting point	131 °C (268 °F; 404 K)
Boiling point	265 °C (509 °F; 538 K)
UV-vis (λ_{max})	255 nm (methanol)
Magnetic susceptibility (χ)	−88.7·10^{−6} cm^{3}/mol

Hazards
NFPA 704 (fire diamond)	1 1 0

Related compounds
Related Parabens	Ethylparaben; Propylparaben; Butylparaben
Related compounds	Methyl salicylate (ortho isomer)
- Except where otherwise noted, data are given for materials in their standard state (at 25 °C [77 °F], 100 kPa). verify (what is ?) Infobox references

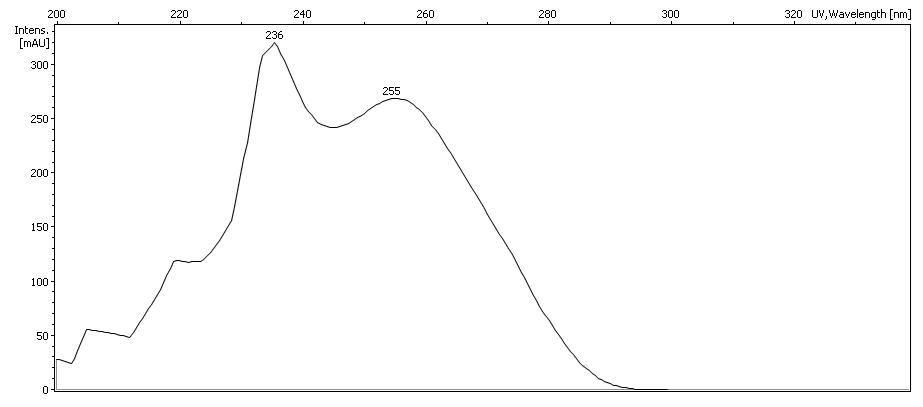
UV-visible spectrum of methylparaben

Methylparaben (methyl paraben) one of the parabens, is a preservative with the chemical formula CH_{3}O_{2}CC_{6}H_{4}OH. It is the methyl ester of p-hydroxybenzoic acid. Several related esters are known (ethyl-, propyl-, butylparaben). Together they are the most common preservatives in cosmetics and foods. Among their advantages, parabens are inexpensive, colorless, stable, odorless, and readily biodegraded.

== Natural occurrences ==
Methylparaben serves as a pheromone for a variety of insects and is a component of queen mandibular pheromone.

It is a pheromone in wolves produced during estrus associated with the behavior of alpha male wolves preventing other males from mounting females in heat.

== Uses ==
Methylparaben is an anti-fungal agent often used in a variety of cosmetics and personal-care products. It is also used as a food preservative and has the E number E218.

Methylparaben is commonly used as a fungicide in Drosophila food media at 0.1%. To Drosophila, methylparaben is toxic at higher concentrations, has an estrogenic effect (mimicking estrogen in rats and having anti-androgenic activity), and slows the growth rate in the larval and pupal stages at 0.2%.

== Safety ==
Methylparaben is practically non-toxic by both oral and parenteral administration in animals. In a population with normal skin, methylparaben is practically non-irritating and non-sensitizing; however, allergic reactions to ingested parabens have been reported. A 2008 study found no competitive binding for human estrogen and androgen receptors for methylparaben, but varying levels of competitive binding were seen with butyl- and isobutyl-paraben.

Some controversy exists about whether methylparaben or propylparabens are harmful at concentrations typically used in body care or cosmetics. Methylparaben and propylparaben are considered generally recognized as safe (GRAS) by the USFDA for food and cosmetic antibacterial preservation. Methylparaben is readily metabolized by common soil bacteria, making it completely biodegradable.

Methylparaben is readily absorbed from the gastrointestinal tract or through the skin. It is hydrolyzed to p-hydroxybenzoic acid and rapidly excreted in urine without accumulating in the body.

Methylparaben applied on the skin may react with UVB, leading to increased skin aging and DNA damage.
