= Oregon Institute of Occupational Health Sciences =

Oregon Institute of Occupational Health Sciences is a research institute based at Oregon Health & Science University, in Portland. The Institute's mission is to promote health, and prevent disease and disability among working Oregonians and their families during their employment years and through retirement. It does this through basic and applied research, outreach and education.

== Institute History ==
The Oregon Institute of Occupational Health Sciences was formed in 1985 by Oregon House Bill 2290 in the Oregon Legislative Assembly to conduct occupational health disease research as the Center for Occupational Disease Research. Base funding was designated from the State of Oregon Workers' Compensation income. The Center was renamed as the Center for Research on Occupational and Environmental Toxicology, or CROET, in 1989. CROET was again renamed Oregon Institute of Occupational Health Sciences in January 2014 in order to better address Oregon's range of workplace needs and prevention of disease. Competitively awarded research grants support the Institute in excess of double the base funding amount.

== Institute Research ==
The Oregon Institute of Occupational Health Sciences conducts research on the following topics:

- Total Worker Health
- Exposure Consequences and Prevention
- Sleep and Shiftwork

Dr. Steven Shea, Ph.D., a sleep and circadian rhythm researcher, is the Director of the Institute, selected in 2013. The founding Director was Dr. Peter Spencer, Ph.D.

The Oregon Healthy Workforce Center, a Center of Excellence funded by NIOSH, is housed within the Institute.

The Institute houses the Oregon Fatality Assessment and Control Evaluation Program, OR-FACE, a NIOSH sponsored program designed to prevent occupational fatalities.

== Education and Engagement ==
The Institute supports a Toxicology and Occupational Health Information Center providing information, resources and continuing education to the public and occupational health, safety and wellness professionals. The most publicized assistance by this Center was to a Portland hair salon regarding the use of a non-labeled formaldehyde-containing hair straightening product, leading to national and international alerts and warnings.
