= 2,5-Dimethoxyphenylacetaldehyde =

Names
- IUPAC name (2,5-Dimethoxyphenyl)acetaldehyde

Identifiers
CAS Number	93-02-7
3D model (JSmol)	Interactive image
ChemSpider	237015
PubChem CID	269549
- InChI: InChI=1S/C10H12O3/c1-12-9-3-4-10(13-2)8(7-9)5-6-11/h3-4,6-7H,5H2,1-2H3 Key: LBMQTRYSDDYFCW-UHFFFAOYSA-N
- SMILES: COC1=CC(=C(C=C1)OC)CC=O

Properties
Chemical formula	C_{10}H_{12}O_{3}
Molar mass	180.203 g·mol^{−1}
- Except where otherwise noted, data are given for materials in their standard state (at 25 °C [77 °F], 100 kPa). Infobox references

2,5-Dimethoxyphenylacetaldehyde is an organic chemical compound and a derivative of acetaldehyde used in Darzens reaction for the synthesis of 2C series compounds (usually only 2,5-dimethoxyphenethylamine).

== Use ==
=== Synthesis of 2,5-dimethoxyphenethylamine ===
2,5-Dimethoxyphenylacetaldehyde is formed as a result of the synthesis of 2,5-dimethoxyphenethylamine from 2,5-dimethoxybenzaldehyde using glycidate until it is converted into the final product.

First, 2,5-dimethoxybenzaldehyde is reacted with methyl chloroacetate in the presence of sodium methylate to form an intermediate epoxide ester; the alkali hydrolyses the ester to form the potassium salt of glycidic acid; decarboxylation then yields 2,5-dimethoxyphenylacetaldehyde. Hydroxylamine is added to the aldehyde; it replaces the oxygen in the aldehyde to form an oxime, which is reduced to 2C-H.
