= Methanediol =

Organic compound (CH2(OH)2); simplest geminal diol

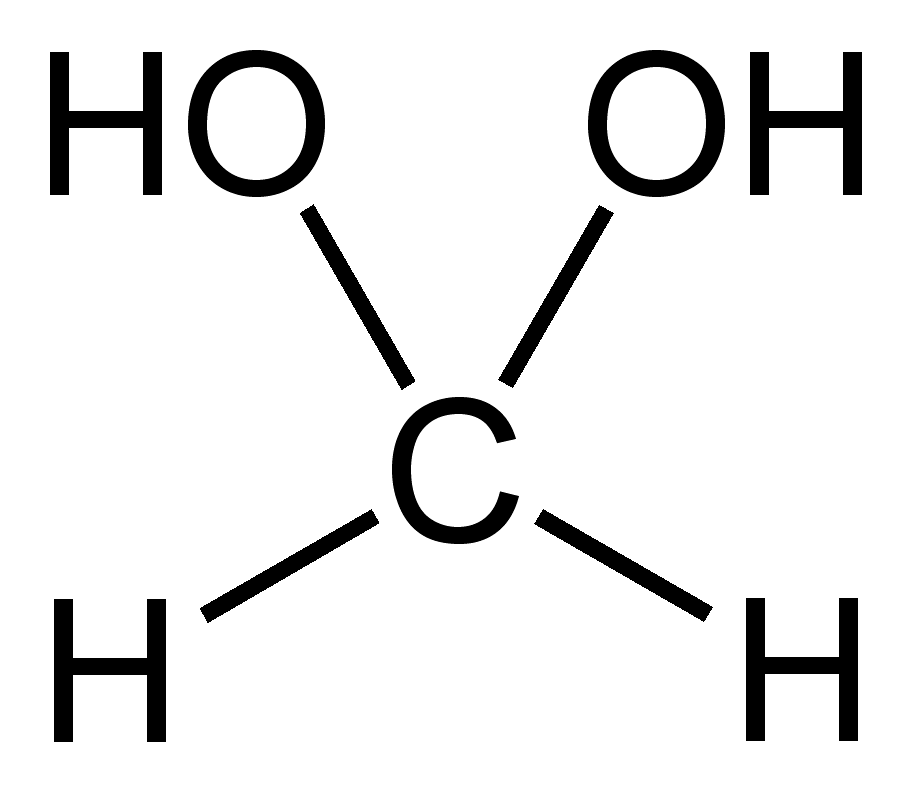
Skeletal formula of methanediol with some explicit hydrogens added
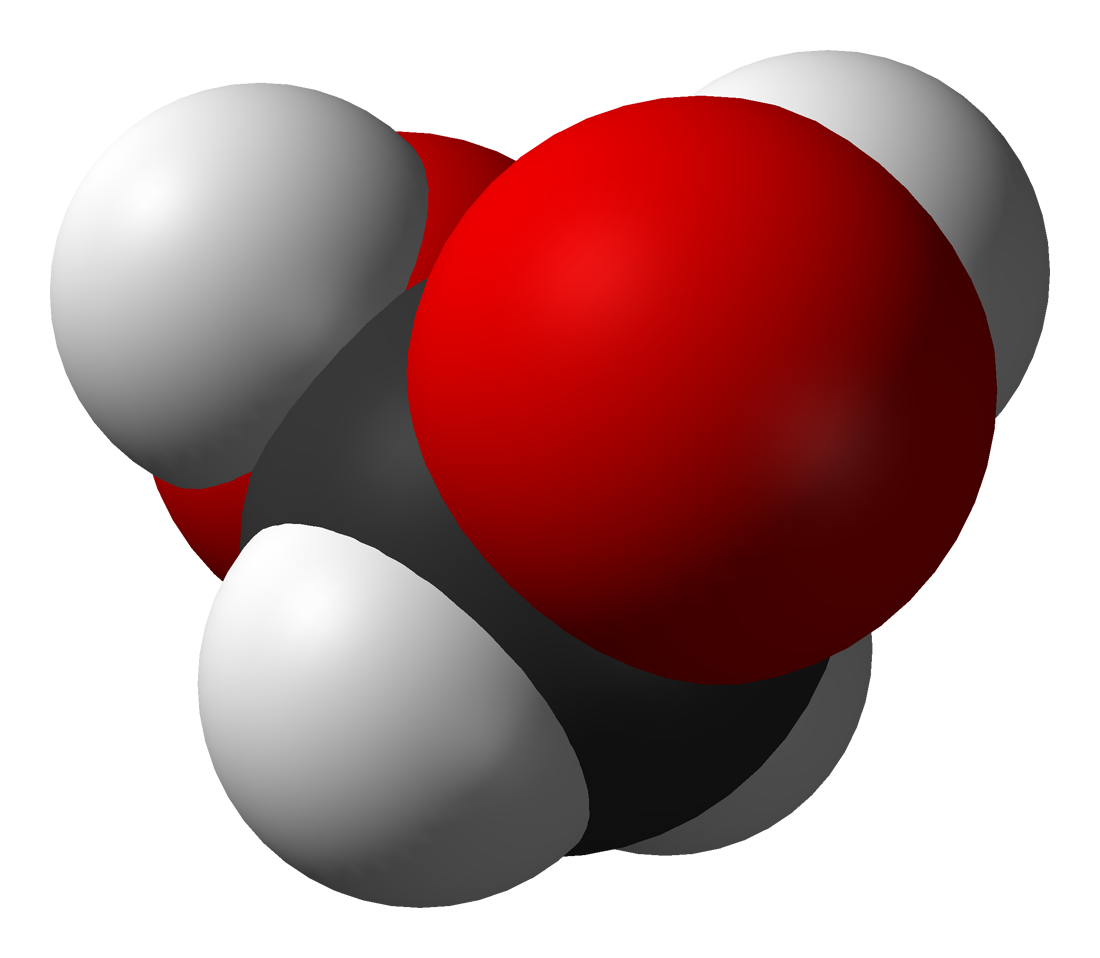
Spacefill model of methanediol
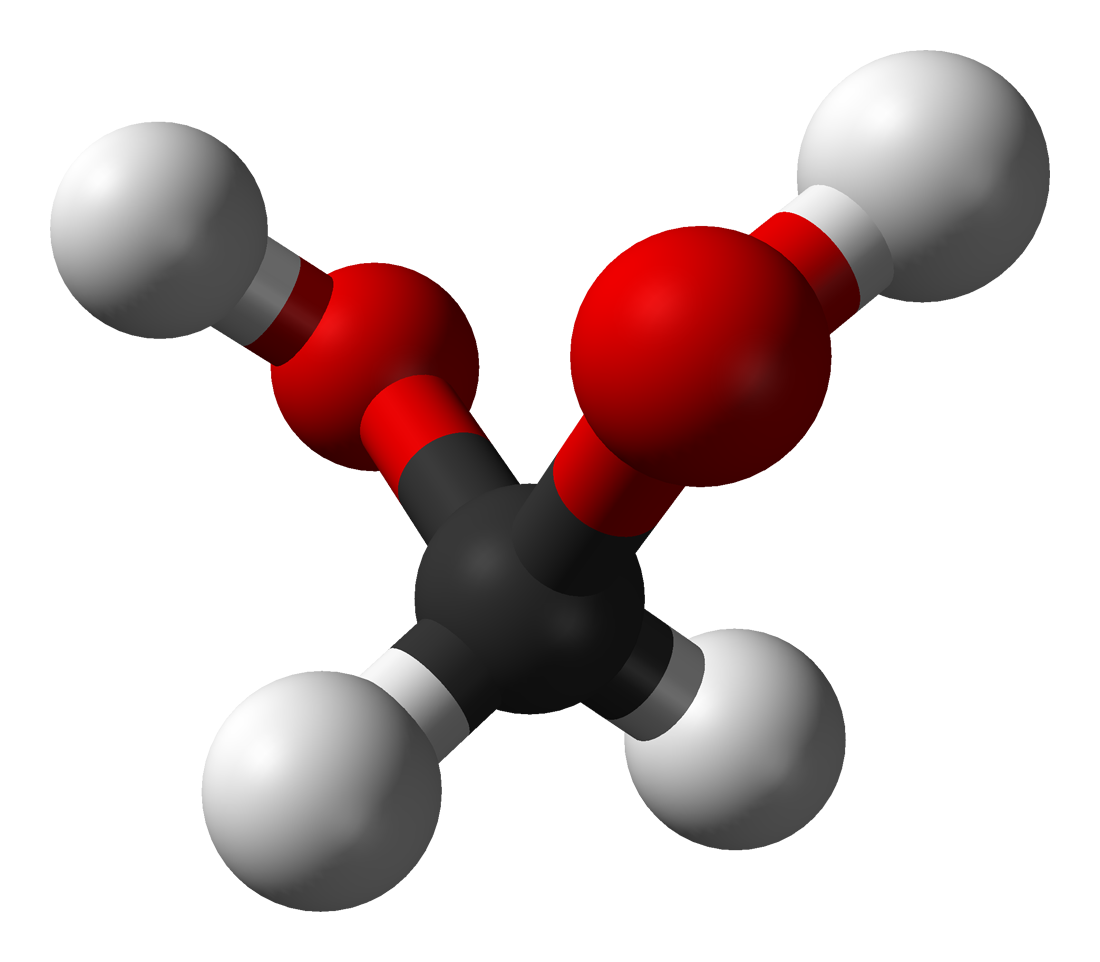
- Ball and stick model of the methanediol

Names
- Preferred IUPAC name Methanediol
- Other names: Formaldehyde hydrate; Formaldehyde monohydrate; Methylene glycol

Identifiers
CAS Number	463-57-0
3D model (JSmol)	Interactive image
Abbreviations	MADOL
Beilstein Reference	1730798
ChEBI	CHEBI:48397
ChemSpider	71348
ECHA InfoCard	100.006.673
EC Number	207-339-5
PubChem CID	79015
UNII	6Z20YM9257
CompTox Dashboard (EPA)	DTXSID50196801
- InChI: InChI=1S/CH4O2/c2-1-3/h2-3H,1H2 Key: CKFGINPQOCXMAZ-UHFFFAOYSA-N
- SMILES: OCO

Properties
Chemical formula	CH_{4}O_{2}
Molar mass	48.041 g·mol^{−1}
Appearance	Colourless liquid
Density	1.199 g/cm^{3}
Boiling point	194 °C (381 °F; 467 K) at 101 kPa
Vapor pressure	16.1 Pa
Acidity (pK_{a})	13.29
Refractive index (n_{D})	1.401

Hazards
Flash point	99.753 °C (211.555 °F; 372.903 K)
- Except where otherwise noted, data are given for materials in their standard state (at 25 °C [77 °F], 100 kPa). verify (what is ?) Infobox references

Methanediol, also known as formaldehyde monohydrate or methylene glycol, is an organic compound with chemical formula CH_{2}(OH)_{2}. It is the simplest geminal diol. In aqueous solutions it coexists with oligomers (short polymers). The compound is closely related and convertible to the industrially significant derivatives paraformaldehyde ((CH_{2}O)_{n}), formaldehyde (H_{2}C=O), and 1,3,5-trioxane ((CH_{2}O)_{3}).

Methanediol is a product of the hydration reaction of formaldehyde. The equilibrium constant for hydration is estimated to be 10^{3},CH_{2}(OH)_{2} predominates in dilute (<0.1%) solution. In more concentrated solutions, it oligomerizes to HO(CH_{2}O)_{n}H.

== Occurrence ==
The dianion, methanediolate, is believed to be an intermediate in the crossed Cannizzaro reaction.

Gaseous methanediols can be generated by electron irradiation and sublimation of a mixture of methanol and oxygen ices.

Methanediol is believed to occur as an intermediate in the decomposition of carbonyl compounds in the atmosphere, and as a product of ozonolysis on these compounds.

== Safety ==
Methanediol, rather than formaldehyde, is listed as one of the main ingredients of "Brazilian blowout", a hair-straightening formula marketed in the United States. The equilibrium with formaldehyde has caused concern since formaldehyde in hair straighteners is a health hazard. Research funded by the Professional Keratin Smoothing Council (PKSC), an industry association that represents selected manufacturers of professional-use only keratin smoothing products, has disputed the risk.

== See also ==
- Orthoformic acid (methanetriol)
- Orthocarbonic acid (methanetetrol)
