= Butylparaben =

Names
- Preferred IUPAC name Butyl 4-hydroxybenzoate
- Other names Butyl paraben; Butyl parahydroxybenzoate; Butyl p-hydroxybenzoate

Identifiers
CAS Number	94-26-8
3D model (JSmol)	Interactive image
ChEMBL	ChEMBL459008
ChemSpider	6916
ECHA InfoCard	100.002.108
KEGG	D01420
PubChem CID	7184
UNII	3QPI1U3FV8
CompTox Dashboard (EPA)	DTXSID3020209
- InChI: InChI=1S/C11H14O3/c1-2-3-8-14-11(13)9-4-6-10(12)7-5-9/h4-7,12H,2-3,8H2,1H3 Key: QFOHBWFCKVYLES-UHFFFAOYSA-N
- SMILES: O=C(OCCCC)c1ccc(O)cc1

Properties
Chemical formula	C_{11}H_{14}O_{3}
Molar mass	194.230 g·mol^{−1}
Appearance	Colorless, odorless, crystalline powder
Melting point	68 to 69 °C (154 to 156 °F; 341 to 342 K)
Solubility in water	Slightly soluble
Solubility in acetone, ethanol, chloroform, glycerin, propylene glycol	Soluble

Hazards
NFPA 704 (fire diamond)	1 1 0

Pharmacology
Legal status	Banned in Thailand, Palau and Hawaii

Related compounds
Related compounds	Paraben; Ethylparaben; Methylparaben; Propylparaben
- Except where otherwise noted, data are given for materials in their standard state (at 25 °C [77 °F], 100 kPa). verify (what is ?) Infobox references

Butylparaben, or butyl p-hydroxybenzoate, is an organic compound with the formula C_{4}H_{9}O_{2}CC_{6}H_{4}OH. It is a white solid that is soluble in organic solvents. It has proven to be a highly successful antimicrobial preservative in cosmetics. It is also used in medication suspensions, and as a flavoring additive in food.

== Natural occurrence ==
Members of the paraben family are found in fruit and vegetable products, such as barley, flax seed, and grapes. Butylparaben has also been found to be produced in some microorganisms including Microbulbifer .

== Preparation ==
Butylparaben is prepared by the esterification of 4-hydroxybenzoic acid with 1-butanol in the presence of an acid catalyst such as sulfuric acid. It is produced industrially.

== Uses and reactions ==
Butylparaben is one of the most common bactericidal/fungicidal additives in cosmetics. It has been used in cosmetic products since the 1940s and in pharmaceutical products since 1924. The popularity of butylparaben in these products is due to its low toxicity in humans and its effective antimicrobial properties, in particular those against mold and yeast. It is now found in more than 20,000 cosmetic products including eye shadow, facial moisturizer/treatment, anti-aging cream, foundation, and sunscreen. It is also used as low-ionic strength solutions as a preservative in some foods and drugs. In most cosmetics paraben is used at low levels, ranging from 0.01 to 0.3%. Butylparaben is used in low concentrations in liquid and solid medication suspensions, such as Tylenol (acetaminophen) and ibuprofen.

=== Mechanism of action ===
The exact mechanism of how parabens work is unknown but they are proposed to act by inhibiting DNA and RNA synthesis, and enzymes like ATPase and phosphotransferase in some bacterial species. It has also been suggested that they interfere with membrane transport processes by disrupting the lipid bilayer and possibly causing the leakage of intracellular constituents.

== Regulation and controversy ==
Butylparaben has not escaped controversy, which itself is controversial.

In December 2010 the Scientific Committee on Consumer Products (SCCP) of the European Union reported that insufficient data is available to perform risk assessments for butylparaben in humans. The committee has also stated that it considers the use of butylparaben and propylparaben as preservatives in finished cosmetic products as safe to the consumer, as long as the sum of their individual concentrations does not exceed 0.19%.

=== Regulation ===
Denmark restricts butylparaben in products for use by children younger than the age of three.

In 2003, butylparaben was approved for use as a flavor additive in food by the U.S. Food and Agriculture Organization and the World Health Organization. Butylparaben is also regulated by the United States Environmental Protection Agency under the U.S. Toxic Substances Control Act of 1976 and the Federal Insecticide, Fungicide, and Rodenticide Act. Its pesticide registration was canceled in 1998.

in 2020 European Chemicals Agency (ECHA) added Butylparaben to very high concern (SVHC) in the Candidate List for eventual inclusion in Annex XIV REACH in category "Toxic for reproduction".

=== Endocrine disruption ===
Long-chained parabens, like butylparaben, are more estrogenic than short-chained parabens, like methyl- or ethylparaben. This difference is attributed to the greater lipophilicity of the former. Butylparaben displayed the most competitive binding to rat estrogen receptors when tested along with methyl, ethyl, and propylparabens.

=== Antiandrogenic ===
Butylparaben can decrease sperm function and alter metabolic hormones. Rats exposed to a high concentration of butylparaben during pregnancy gave birth to fewer pups, and pups with malformed reproductive organs. Mice administered butylparaben at 0.01-1% body weight for ten weeks showed a decrease in serum testosterone concentration and in spermatid counts in the seminiferous tubules.

=== Other ===
It has been shown that butylparaben enter the body through the lungs, GI tract, and skin epithelium.

It occurs in breast cancers at around 20.6±4.2 ng/g tissue. However, parabens have not been proven to cause breast cancer. Estimates by the U.S. Food and Drug Administration and the Center for Food Safety and Applied Nutrition have found that the average person is exposed to about 37 ng of butylparaben per day.

Butylparaben has been found in small concentrations in human breast fat and breast tumors. A review by the National Toxicology Program concluded, "There is no evidence of demonstrable risk for the development of breast cancer caused by the use of paraben-containing underarm cosmetics." Animal studies have been inconclusive. Oral administration of butylparaben to eight-week-old rats has caused tumors such as thymic lymphoma, non-thymic lymphoid leukemia, and myeloid leukemia. Similar studies, however, have found no significant increase in tumors upon butylparaben administration. Butylparaben is not listed as a carcinogen by the International Agency for Research on Cancer.

== Environmental fate ==
Butylparaben has been found in the sewage. A 2001 study found that concentrations of parabens in Danish sewage facilities was to 1/100 to 1/1000 of the acute or chronic effect concentrations.
