= Ethylparaben =

Chemical compound

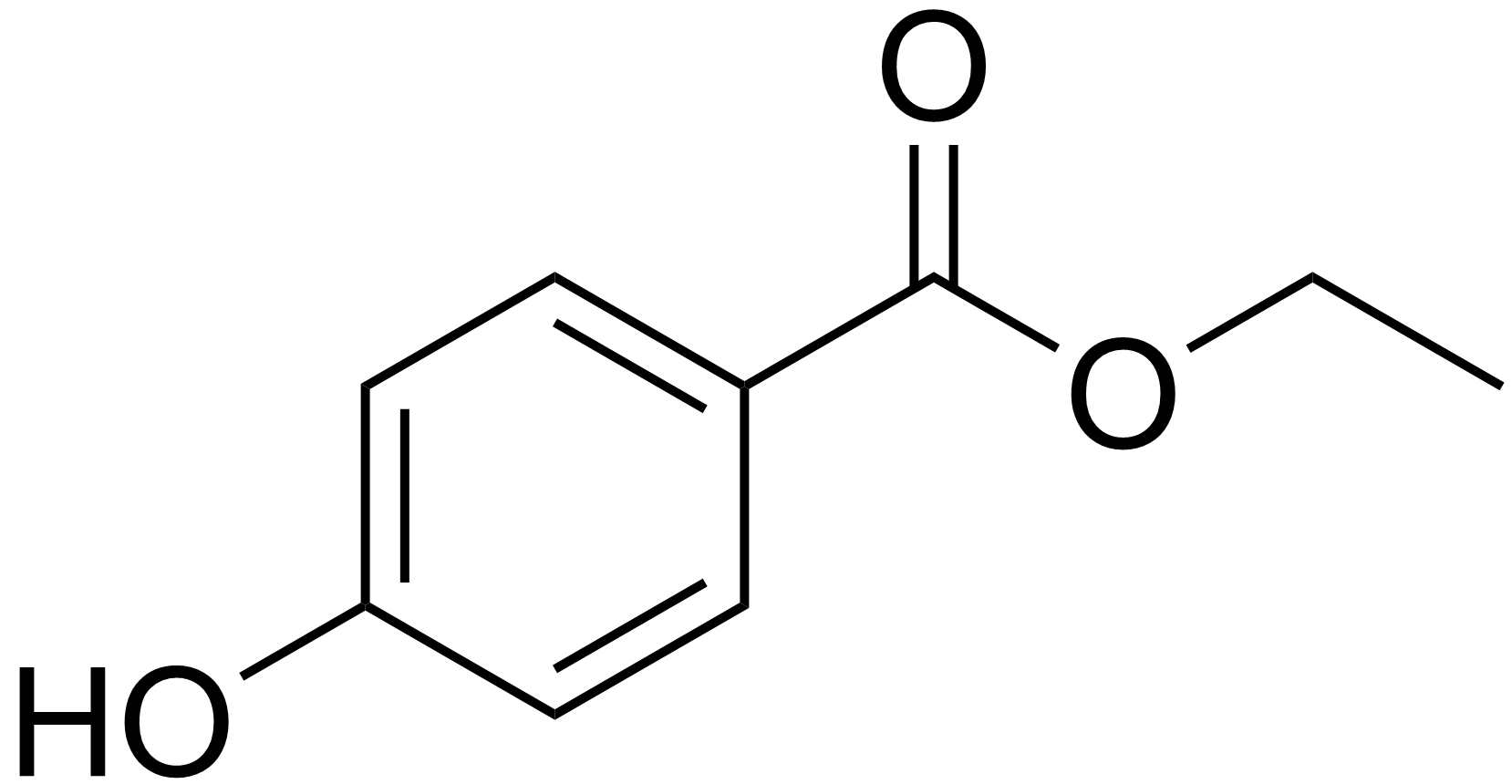

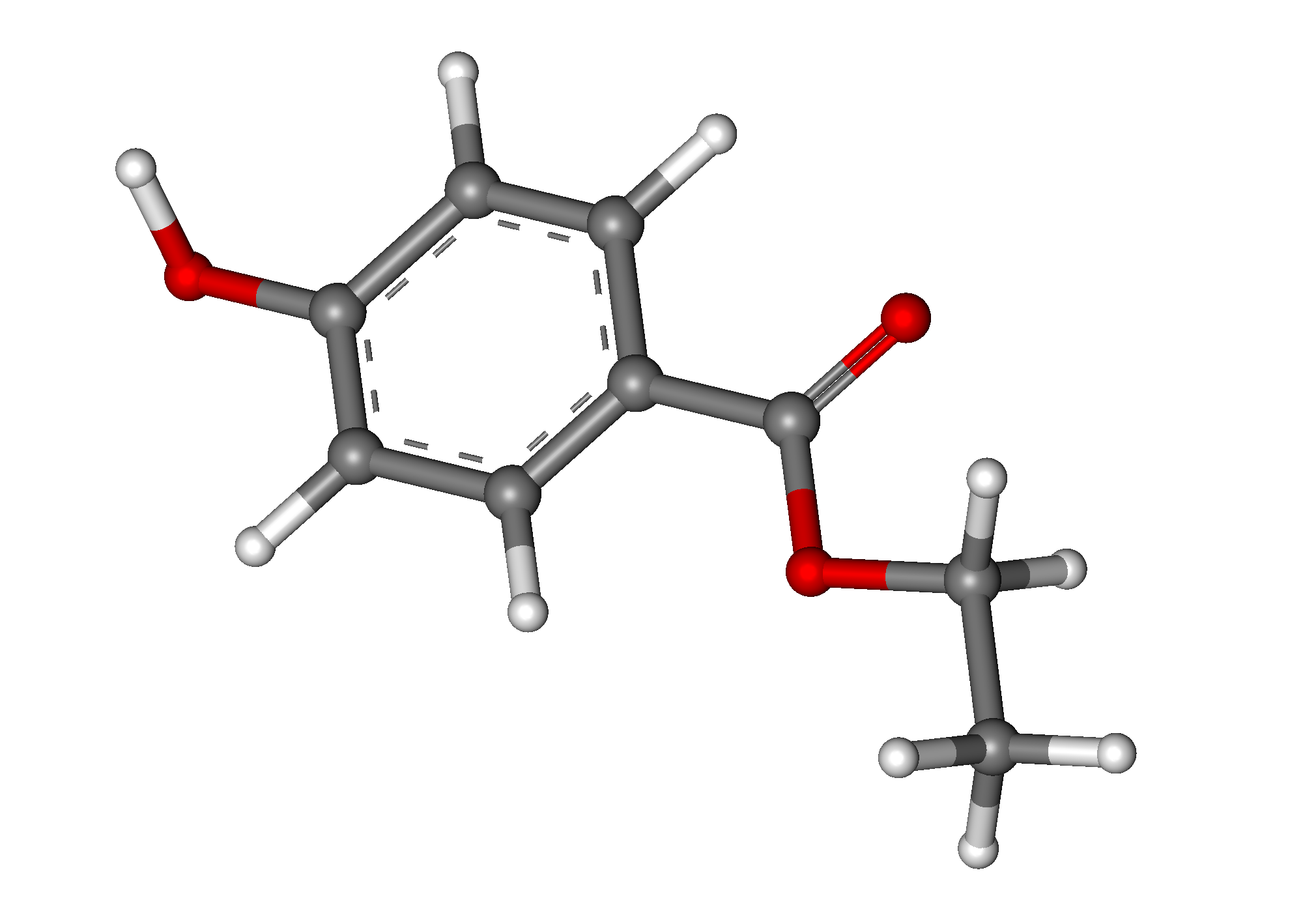

Names
- Preferred IUPAC name Ethyl 4-hydroxybenzoate
- Other names: Ethyl paraben; Ethyl parahydroxybenzoate; Ethyl para-hydroxybenzoate; Ethyl p-hydroxybenzoate; 4-Hydroxybenzoic acid ethyl ester

Identifiers
CAS Number	120-47-8
3D model (JSmol)	Interactive image
ChEBI	CHEBI:31575
ChEMBL	ChEMBL15841
ChemSpider	13846749
DrugBank	DB13628
ECHA InfoCard	100.004.000
EC Number	204-399-4
E number	E214 (preservatives)
KEGG	D01647
MeSH	ethyl-p-hydroxybenzoate
PubChem CID	8434
UNII	14255EXE39
CompTox Dashboard (EPA)	DTXSID801067865 DTXSID9022528, DTXSID801067865
- InChI: InChI=1S/C9H10O3/c1-2-12-9(11)7-3-5-8(10)6-4-7/h3-6,10H,2H2,1H3 Key: NUVBSKCKDOMJSU-UHFFFAOYSA-N; InChI=1/C9H10O3/c1-2-12-9(11)7-3-5-8(10)6-4-7/h3-6,10H,2H2,1H3 Key: NUVBSKCKDOMJSU-UHFFFAOYAQ
- SMILES: O=C(OCC)c1ccc(O)cc1

Properties
Chemical formula	C_{9}H_{10}O_{3}
Molar mass	166.176 g·mol^{−1}
Melting point	115 to 118 °C (239 to 244 °F; 388 to 391 K)
Boiling point	297 to 298 °C (567 to 568 °F; 570 to 571 K)

Pharmacology
ATC code	D01AE10 (WHO)

Hazards
- GHS labelling
Pictograms	(GHS06: Toxic)
Signal word	Danger
Hazard statements	H334
Precautionary statements	P261, P285, P304+P341, P342+P311, P501
NFPA 704 (fire diamond)	1 1 0
Flash point	248 °C (478 °F; 521 K)

Related compounds
Related compounds	Paraben; Butylparaben; Methylparaben; Propylparaben
- Except where otherwise noted, data are given for materials in their standard state (at 25 °C [77 °F], 100 kPa). verify (what is ?) Infobox references

Ethylparaben (ethyl para-hydroxybenzoate) is the ethyl ester of p-hydroxybenzoic acid. Its formula is HO-C_{6}H_{4}-CO-O-CH_{2}CH_{3}. It is a member of the class of compounds known as parabens.

It is used as an antifungal preservative. As a food additive, it has E number E214.

Sodium ethyl para-hydroxybenzoate, the sodium salt of ethylparaben, has the same uses and is given the E number E215.
