= Isopropylparaben =

Names
- Preferred IUPAC name Propan-2-yl 4-hydroxybenzoate
- Other names Isopropyl 4-hydroxybenzoate; Isopropyl p-hydroxybenzoate

Identifiers
CAS Number	4191-73-5
3D model (JSmol)	Interactive image
ChEMBL	ChEMBL2333962
ChemSpider	18995
ECHA InfoCard	100.021.882
EC Number	224-069-3
KEGG	C20343
PubChem CID	20161
UNII	A6EOX47QK0
CompTox Dashboard (EPA)	DTXSID3052858
- InChI: InChI=1S/C10H12O3/c1-7(2)13-10(12)8-3-5-9(11)6-4-8/h3-7,11H,1-2H3 Key: CMHMMKSPYOOVGI-UHFFFAOYSA-N
- SMILES: CC(C)OC(=O)C1=CC=C(C=C1)O

Properties
Chemical formula	C_{10}H_{12}O_{3}
Molar mass	180.203 g·mol^{−1}
- Except where otherwise noted, data are given for materials in their standard state (at 25 °C [77 °F], 100 kPa). Infobox references

Isopropylparaben is a paraben.

== Synthesis ==
Isopropylparaben has been prepared via the stepwise addition of isopropanol, thionyl chloride, and p-hydroxybenzoic acid at low temperature, followed by heating the reaction mixture.
