= Paraben =

Class of chemical compounds; esters of parahydroxybenzoic acid

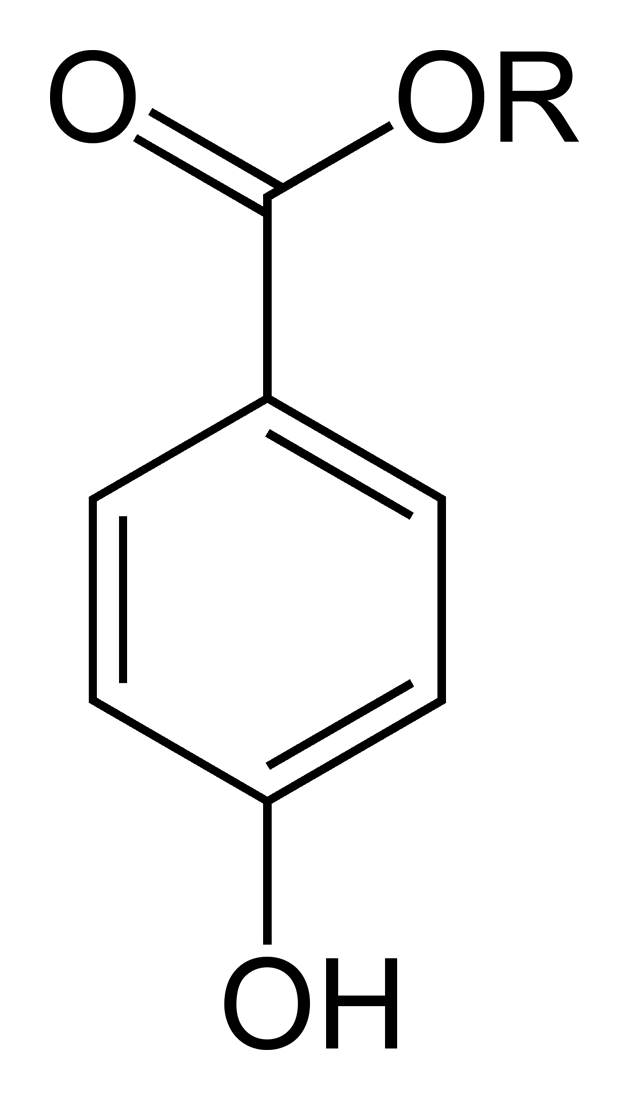
General chemical structure of a paraben (a para-hydroxybenzoate) where R = an alkyl group

Parabens are organic compounds that are commonly used as preservatives in cosmetic and pharmaceutical products. They are esters of parahydroxybenzoic acid (also known as 4-hydroxybenzoic acid).

== Chemistry ==
=== Structure ===
Parabens are esters of para-hydroxybenzoic acid, from which the name is derived. Common parabens include methylparaben (E number E218), ethylparaben (E214), propylparaben (E216), butylparaben and heptylparaben (E209). Less common parabens include isobutylparaben, isopropylparaben, benzylparaben and their sodium salts.

They are produced by the esterification of para-hydroxybenzoic acid with the appropriate alcohol, such as methanol, ethanol, or n-propanol. para-Hydroxybenzoic acid is in turn produced industrially from a modification of the Kolbe-Schmitt reaction, using potassium phenoxide and carbon dioxide.

=== Biological mode of action ===
Parabens are active against a broad spectrum of microorganisms. However, their antibacterial mode of action is not well understood. They are thought to act by disrupting membrane transport processes or by inhibiting synthesis of DNA and RNA or of some key enzymes, such as ATPases and phosphotransferases, in some bacterial species. Propylparaben is considered more active against more bacteria than methylparaben. The stronger antibacterial action of propylparaben may be due to its greater solubility in the bacterial membrane, which may allow it to reach cytoplasmic targets in greater concentrations. However, since a majority of the studies on the mechanism of action of parabens suggest that their antibacterial action is linked to the membrane, it is possible that its greater lipid solubility disrupts the lipid bilayer, thereby interfering with bacterial membrane transport processes and perhaps causing the leakage of intracellular constituents.

== Applications ==
Parabens are found in shampoos, commercial moisturizers, shaving gels, personal lubricants, topical/parenteral pharmaceuticals, sun-tan products, makeup, and toothpaste. They are also used as food preservatives. Parabens are additionally found in pharmaceutical products such as topical treatments for wounds.

== Safety ==
Methylparaben, and implicitly the other esters, is practically non-toxic by both oral and parenteral administration in animals. It is hydrolyzed to p-hydroxybenzoic acid and rapidly excreted in urine without accumulating in the body.

=== Allergic reactions ===
Parabens are, for the most part, non-irritating and non-sensitizing. Among people with contact dermatitis or eczema, less than 3% of patients were found to have a sensitivity to parabens.

=== Estrogenic activity ===
Studies in rats have indicated that parabens may mimic the hormone estrogen, raising concerns over possible contributions to breast cancer. However, according to Cancer Research UK, there is no reliable evidence that parabens cause breast cancer in humans.

The estrogenic activity of parabens increases with the length of the alkyl group. It is believed that propylparaben is estrogenic to a certain degree as well, though this is expected to be less than butylparaben by virtue of its less lipophilic nature. Since it can be concluded that the estrogenic activity of butylparaben is negligible under normal use, the same should be concluded for shorter analogs due to estrogenic activity of parabens increasing with the length of the alkyl group.

== Controversy ==
Concerns about endocrine disruptors have led consumers and companies to search for paraben-free alternatives. A common alternative has been phenoxyethanol, but this has its own risks and has led to an FDA warning on inclusion in nipple creams.

=== Regulation ===
The European Scientific Committee on Consumer Safety (SCCS) reiterated in 2013 that methylparaben and ethylparaben are safe at the maximum authorized concentrations (up to 0.4% for one ester or 0.8% when used in combination). The SCCS concluded that the use of butylparaben and propylparaben as preservatives in finished cosmetic products is safe to the consumer, as long as the sum of their individual concentrations does not exceed 0.19%. Isopropylparaben, isobutylparaben, phenylparaben, benzylparaben and pentylparaben were banned by European Commission Regulation (EU) No 358/2014.

== Environmental considerations ==
=== Release into the environment ===
Paraben discharge into the environment is common due to their ubiquitous use in cosmetic products. A 2010 study on consumer available personal care products revealed that 44% of the tested products contain parabens.

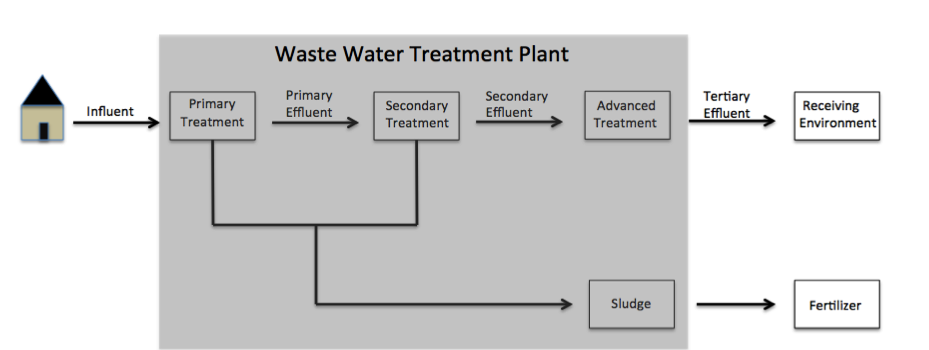
General flow of parabens as they make their way through wastewater treatment plants.

In one New York wastewater treatment plant (WWTP), mass load of all parent paraben derivatives (methylparaben, ethylparaben, propylparaben, butylparaben, etc.) from influent wastewater was found to be 176 mg/day/1000 people. When this value is used to estimate the amount of parabens entering WWTPs from the 8.5 million people currently residing in New York City for an entire year, a value of approximately 546 kg (1,204 lb) of parabens is calculated. Therefore, levels of paraben accumulation prove significant upon long-term observance. WWTPs eliminate between 92–98% of paraben derivatives; however, much of this removal is due to the formation of degradation products. Despite their reputed high elimination through WWTPs, various studies have measured high levels of paraben derivatives and degradation products persisting in the environment.

=== 4-Hydroxybenzoic acid (PHBA) ===
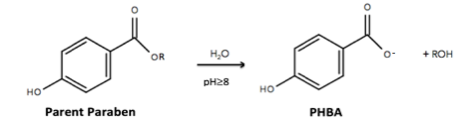
Overall reaction showing the degradation of a parent paraben to 4-hydroxybenzoic acid through base-catalyzed hydrolysis of the ester bond.

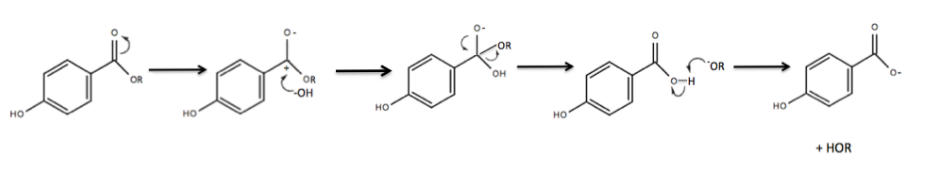
Arrow pushing mechanism showing the degradation of a parent paraben into PHBA through base-catalyzed hydrolysis of the ester bond

4-Hydroxybenzoic acid (PHBA) is a significant degradation product . Within WWTPs, some parabens accumulate in the sludge. Enterobacter cloacae, and possibly other organisms, metabolize the sludge parabens into PHBA.

=== Bioaccumulation of degradation products ===
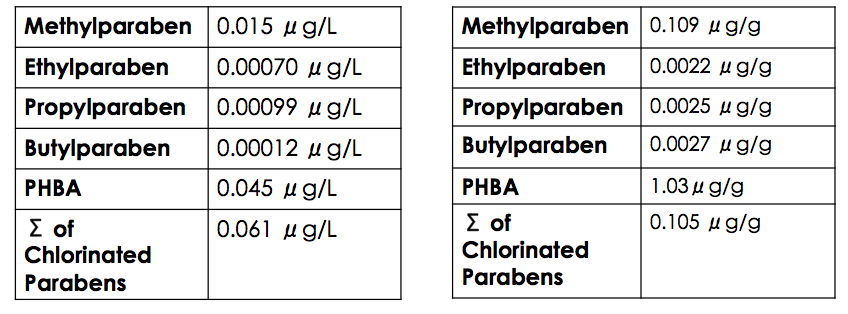
Concentrations of parabens in tertiary effluent water samples in μg/L (left). Concentrations of parabens in sewage sludge samples in μg/g (right).

The accumulation of paraben derivatives and degradation products in the environment have been quantified.Soil adsorption coefficient values were calculated by the U.S. Environmental Protection Agency as 1.94 (methylparaben), 2.20 (ethylparaben), 2.46 (propylparaben), and 2.72 (butylparaben), all of which suggest that parabens have the ability to adhere to the organic portion of sediment and sludge, and thus, persist environmentally.

Chlorinated parabens are removed from WWTPs with only 40% efficiency in comparison to 92–98% efficiency of parent parabens. The decrease in removal efficiency can be attributed to the decreased biodegradability of chlorinated parabens, their increased overall stability throughout WWTPs, and their relatively low sorption to the sludge phase due to low log K_{ow} values.

Higher levels of PHBA are found in tertiary effluent in comparison to paraben derivatives, and PHBA exists in the highest concentration in sewage sludge. There are two reasons for these levels of accumulation. The first reason is PHBA's tendency to sorb to solid particles, which can be approximated by benzoic acid's high K_{d} value of approximately 19. The pKa of PHBA is 2.7, but it is in an environment of a pH between 6–9. Since the pKa is less than the pH, the carboxylic acid will be deprotonated. The carboxylate allows it to act as a sorbent on solid environmental matrices, thus promoting its aggregation in tertiary effluent, but especially sewage sludge, which acts as the solid matrix itself. The second reason is due to the intermediate increase in levels of PHBA during the secondary clarifier phase of the WWTP through biological processes.

=== Environmental concerns with paraben degradation products ===
Multiple studies have linked chlorinated parabens to endocrine disrupting functions, specifically mimicking the effects of estrogen, and chlorinated parabens are believed to be 3–4 times more toxic than their parent paraben. In Daphnia magna, general toxicity conferred by chlorinated parabens occurs through non-specific disruption of cell membrane function. The potency of the chlorinated parabens correlates with the propensity of the compound to accumulate in cell membranes. Thus, chlorinated parabens generally increase in toxicity as their ester chains increase in length due to their increased hydrophobicity.

Hazards include, but are not limited to, abnormal fetal development, endocrine disrupting activity, and improper estrogen-promoting effects. If the tertiary effluent is released to the environment in rivers and streams or if the sludge is used as fertilizer, it poses as a hazard to environmental organisms. It is especially toxic to those organisms on lower trophic levels, particularly various algal species. In fact, it has been shown that the LC_{50} for a specific algal species, Selenastrum capricornutum, is 0.032 micrograms per litre (μg/L). This is less than the natural abundance of PHBA in tertiary effluent at a level of 0.045 μg/L, thus indicating that current levels of PHBA in tertiary effluent can potentially eradicate more than 50% of Selenastrum capricornutum it comes in contact with.

=== Removal of parabens through ozonation ===
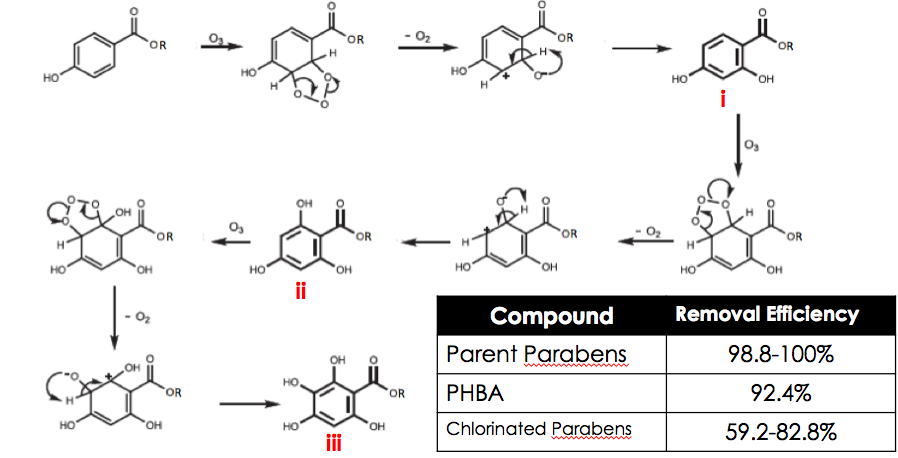
Arrow pushing mechanism of the ozonation of parabens.

Ozonation is an advanced treatment technique that has been considered as a possible method to limit the amount of parabens, chlorinated parabens, and PHBA that are accumulating in the environment. Ozone is an extremely powerful oxidant that oxidizes parabens and makes them easier to remove once subsequently passed through a filter. Due to the electrophilic nature of ozone, it can easily react with the aromatic paraben ring to form hydroxylated products. Ozonation is generally regarded as a less dangerous method of disinfection than chlorination, though ozonation requires more cost considerations. Ozonation has demonstrated great efficacy in the removal of parabens (98.8–100%) and a slightly lower efficacy of 92.4% for PHBA. A moderately lower rate of removal, however, is observed for chlorinated parabens (59.2–82.8%). A proposed reaction mechanism for the removal of parabens by ozonation is detailed mechanistically.
