= Pigment Yellow 97 =

Identifiers
CAS Number	12225-18-2
3D model (JSmol)	Interactive image
ChemSpider	21160012
ECHA InfoCard	100.032.195
EC Number	235-427-3
PubChem CID	61559
UNII	8ZNH60AHS0
CompTox Dashboard (EPA)	DTXSID9041736
- InChI: InChI=1S/C26H27ClN4O8S/c1-15(32)25(26(33)28-18-12-20(36-2)17(27)11-21(18)37-3)30-29-19-13-23(39-5)24(14-22(19)38-4)40(34,35)31-16-9-7-6-8-10-16/h6-14,25,31H,1-5H3,(H,28,33) Key: WNWZKKBGFYKSGA-UHFFFAOYSA-N
- SMILES: CC(=O)C(C(=O)NC1=CC(=C(C=C1OC)Cl)OC)N=NC2=CC(=C(C=C2OC)S(=O)(=O)NC3=CC=CC=C3)OC

Properties
Chemical formula	C_{26}H_{27}ClN_{4}O_{8}S
Molar mass	591.03 g·mol^{−1}
Appearance	yellow solid
- Except where otherwise noted, data are given for materials in their standard state (at 25 °C [77 °F], 100 kPa). Infobox references

Color Index Pigment Yellow 97 is widely used as a yellow colorant, and is classified as an arylide yellow. It is distinguished by the presence of a sulfonylaminophenyl group, which renders the material particularly insoluble (resistant to migration).

== Properties ==
Pigment Yellow 97 exhibits extremely high light fastness and weather fastness. Its resistance to organic solvents and its recoatability are superior to those of other monoazo pigments. The presence of an N-phenylsulfonamide group improves migration fastness.

Although the compound is often depicted as an azo compound, X-ray crystallography shows that the hydrazone form is favored as a result of azo-hydrazo-tautomerism.

== Production ==
It is derived from two fairly complicated precursors. The acetoacetanilide component is made from 2,5-dimethoxy-4-chloroaniline. The azo component is made from a dimethoxyaniline with the sulfonylaminophenyl substituent. The compound is obtained via acetoacetylation of o-tolidine using diketene. The resulting bisacetoacetylated compound is coupled with two equiv of the diazonium salt obtained from 2,4-dichloroaniline.

Arylide yellow pigments are obtained by acetoacetylation of an aromatic amine with diketene, followed by reaction with a diazo component in an azo coupling to form the pigment. Pigment Yellow 97 (6) is produced by diazotization of 4-amino-2,5-dimethoxy-N-phenylbenzenesulfonamide (1) and subsequent coupling of the diazo component (2) with 4-chloro-2,5-dimethoxyacetoacetanilid (5). The coupling component is obtained by reaction of diketene (4) with 2,5-dimethoxy-4-chloroaniline (3).

== Use ==
Pigment Yellow 97 is used in a wide range of applications. In the field of paints, it is suitable for industrial coatings in pastel color shades and for automotive refinish paints used as tinting colors. In emulsion paint, it can also be used for outdoor applications. In the printing ink sector, it is primarily used for high-quality printed products with stringent fastness requirements. Another area of application is plastics, for example in transparent and opaque colorations in rigid PVC. Pigment Yellow 97 is also used for pigmenting epoxy resins and resins based on unsaturated compounds polyesters, as well as printer inks.
