= Pigment Orange 34 =

Identifiers
CAS Number	15793-73-4
3D model (JSmol)	Interactive image
ChemSpider	19619567
ECHA InfoCard	100.036.256
EC Number	239-898-6
PubChem CID	135564710
UNII	6DWP6ESY9N
CompTox Dashboard (EPA)	DTXSID60864640
- InChI: InChI=1S/C34H28Cl2N8O2/c1-19-5-11-25(12-6-19)43-33(45)31(21(3)41-43)39-37-29-15-9-23(17-27(29)35)24-10-16-30(28(36)18-24)38-40-32-22(4)42-44(34(32)46)26-13-7-20(2)8-14-26/h5-18,45-46H,1-4H3 Key: FAVXWUNWIUOTEJ-UHFFFAOYSA-N
- SMILES: Cc1ccc(-n2nc(C)c(/N=N/c3ccc(-c4ccc(/N=N/c5c(C)nn(-c6ccc(C)cc6)c5O)c(Cl)c4)cc3Cl)c2O)cc1

Properties
Chemical formula	C_{34}H_{28}Cl_{2}N_{8}O_{2}
Molar mass	651.55 g·mol^{−1}
Appearance	orange solid
- Except where otherwise noted, data are given for materials in their standard state (at 25 °C [77 °F], 100 kPa). Infobox references

Pigment Orange 34 is an organic compound and an azo compound. It is a commercial orange pigment, i.e. an insoluble colorant. It is also classified as a diarylide pigment, being derived from 3,3'-dichlorobenzidine. It is closely related to Pigment Orange 13, wherein the two tolyl groups are replaced by phenyl groups.

Pigment Orange 34 is a popular component of artist's paints.
