= Pigment Yellow 16 =

Names
- Systematic IUPAC name N,N′-(3,3′-Dimethyl[1,1′-biphenyl]-4,4′-diyl)bis{4-[(E)-(2,4-dichlorophenyl)diazenyl]-3-oxobutanamide}

Identifiers
CAS Number	5979-28-2
3D model (JSmol)	Interactive image
ChemSpider	20921
ECHA InfoCard	100.025.258
EC Number	227-783-3
PubChem CID	22288
UNII	R3896P1A0H
CompTox Dashboard (EPA)	DTXSID6021452
- InChI: InChI=1S/C34H28Cl4N6O4/c1-17-13-21(5-9-27(17)39-33(47)31(19(3)45)43-41-29-11-7-23(35)15-25(29)37)22-6-10-28(18(2)14-22)40-34(48)32(20(4)46)44-42-30-12-8-24(36)16-26(30)38/h5-16,31-32H,1-4H3,(H,39,47)(H,40,48)/b43-41+,44-42+ Key: JFMYRCRXYIIGBB-CHQNLTHESA-N
- SMILES: Clc1cc(Cl)ccc1/N=N/C(C(=O)C)C(=O)Nc2ccc(cc2C)-c3cc(C)c(cc3)NC(=O)C(C(=O)C)/N=N/c4ccc(Cl)cc4Cl

Properties
Chemical formula	C_{34}H_{28}Cl_{4}N_{6}O_{4}
Molar mass	726.44 g·mol^{−1}
Appearance	Yellow solid
- Except where otherwise noted, data are given for materials in their standard state (at 25 °C [77 °F], 100 kPa). Infobox references

Pigment Yellow 16 is an organic compound that is classified as a diarylide pigment.

Pigment Yellow 16 is used as a yellow colorant, and is classified as an arylide yellow. Also called permanent yellow, its color index number is 20040. The compound is obtained via acetoacetylation of o-tolidine using diketene. The resulting bisacetoacetylated compound is coupled with two equiv of the diazonium salt obtained from 2,4-dichloroaniline.
