= Benzidine =

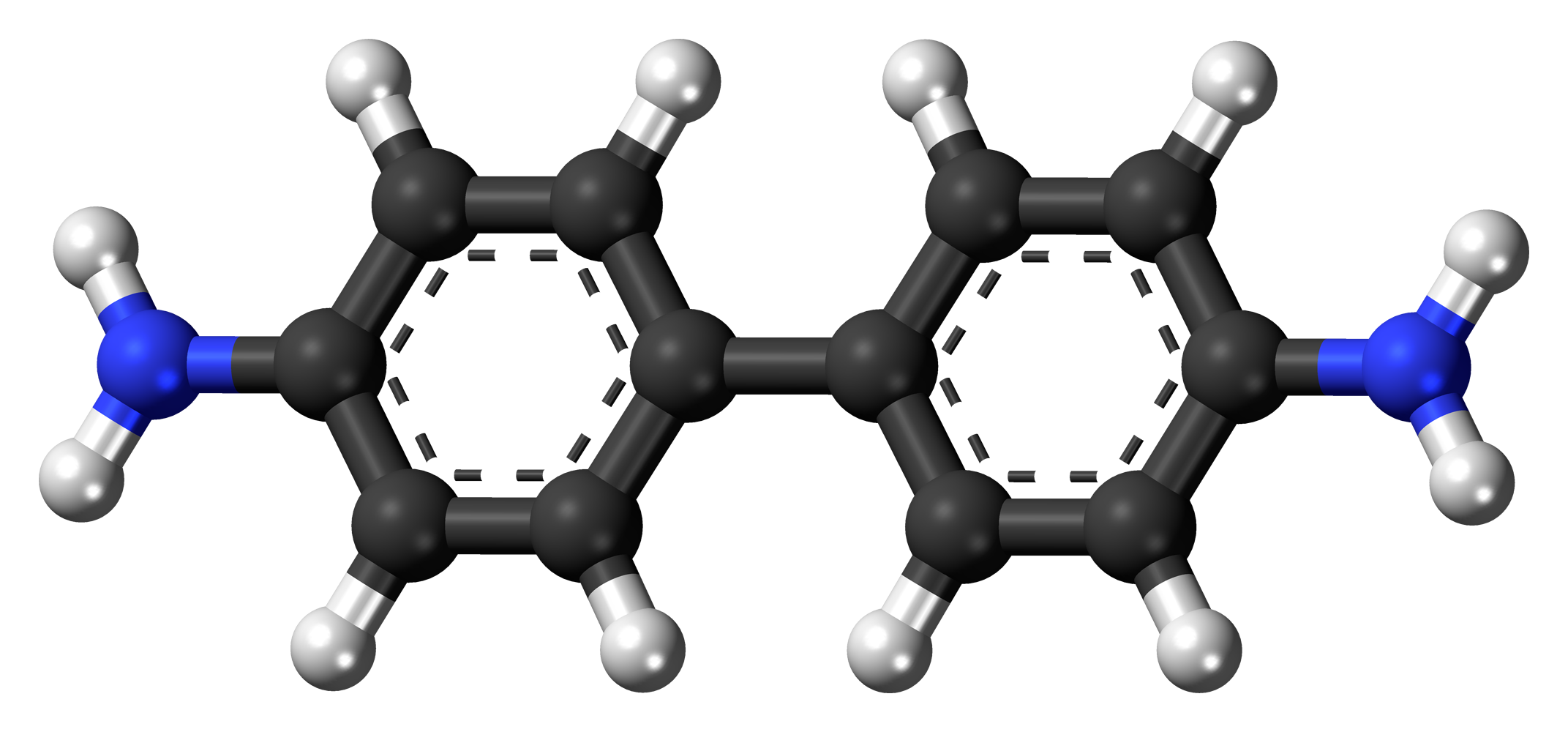

Names
- Preferred IUPAC name [1,1′-Biphenyl]-4,4′-diamine
- Other names Benzidine, di-phenylamine, diphenylamine, 4,4'-bianiline, 4,4'-biphenyldiamine, 1,1'-biphenyl-4,4'-diamine, 4,4'-diaminobiphenyl, p-diaminodiphenyl, p-benzidine

Identifiers
| CAS Number | 92-87-5 |
| 3D model (JSmol) | Interactive image |
| ChEBI | CHEBI:80495 |
| ChEMBL | ChEMBL15901 |
| ChemSpider | 6844 |
| ECHA InfoCard | 100.002.000 |
| EC Number | 202-199-1 |
| KEGG | C16444 |
| PubChem CID | 7111 |
| RTECS number | DC9625000 |
| UNII | 2X02101HVF |
| UN number | 1885 |
| CompTox Dashboard (EPA) | DTXSID2020137 |
- InChI: InChI=1S/C12H12N2/c13-11-5-1-9(2-6-11)10-3-7-12(14)8-4-10/h1-8H,13-14H2 Key: HFACYLZERDEVSX-UHFFFAOYSA-N; InChI=1/C12H12N2/c13-11-5-1-9(2-6-11)10-3-7-12(14)8-4-10/h1-8H,13-14H2 Key: HFACYLZERDEVSX-UHFFFAOYAX
- SMILES: c2c(c1ccc(N)cc1)ccc(N)c2

Properties
| Chemical formula | C_{12}H_{12}N_{2} |
| Molar mass | 184.24 g/mol |
| Appearance | Grayish-yellow, reddish-gray, or white crystalline powder |
| Density | 1.25 g/cm^{3} |
| Melting point | 122 to 125 °C (252 to 257 °F; 395 to 398 K) |
| Boiling point | 400 °C (752 °F; 673 K) |
| Solubility in water | 0.94 g/100 mL at 100 °C |
| Magnetic susceptibility (χ) | −110.9·10^{−6} cm^{3}/mol |

Related compounds
| Related compounds | biphenyl |

Hazards
- Occupational safety and health (OHS/OSH)
| Main hazards | carcinogenic |
- GHS labelling
| Pictograms | (GHS07: Exclamation mark) (GHS08: Health hazard) (GHS09: Environmental hazard) |
| Signal word | Danger |
| Hazard statements | H302, H350, H410 |
| Precautionary statements | P201, P202, P264, P270, P273, P281, P301+P312, P308+P313, P330, P391, P405, P501 |
- NIOSH (US health exposure limits)
| PEL (Permissible) | occupational carcinogen |
- Except where otherwise noted, data are given for materials in their standard state (at 25 °C [77 °F], 100 kPa). verify (what is ?) Infobox references

Benzidine (trivial name), also called 1,1'-biphenyl-4,4'-diamine (systematic name), is an organic compound with the formula (C_{6}H_{4}NH_{2})_{2}. It is an aromatic amine. It is a component of a test for cyanide. Related derivatives are used in the production of dyes. Benzidine has been linked to bladder and pancreatic cancer.

== Synthesis and properties ==
Benzidine is prepared in a two step process from nitrobenzene. First, the nitrobenzene is converted to 1,2-diphenylhydrazine, usually using iron powder as the reducing agent. Treatment of this hydrazine with mineral acids induces a rearrangement reaction to 4,4'-benzidine. Smaller amounts of other isomers are also formed. The benzidine rearrangement, which proceeds intramolecularly, is a classic mechanistic puzzle in organic chemistry.

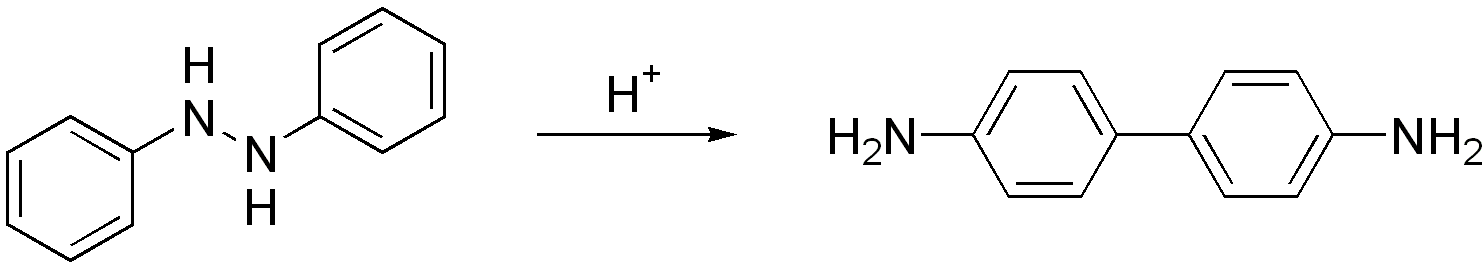

The conversion is described as a [5,5] sigmatropic reaction.

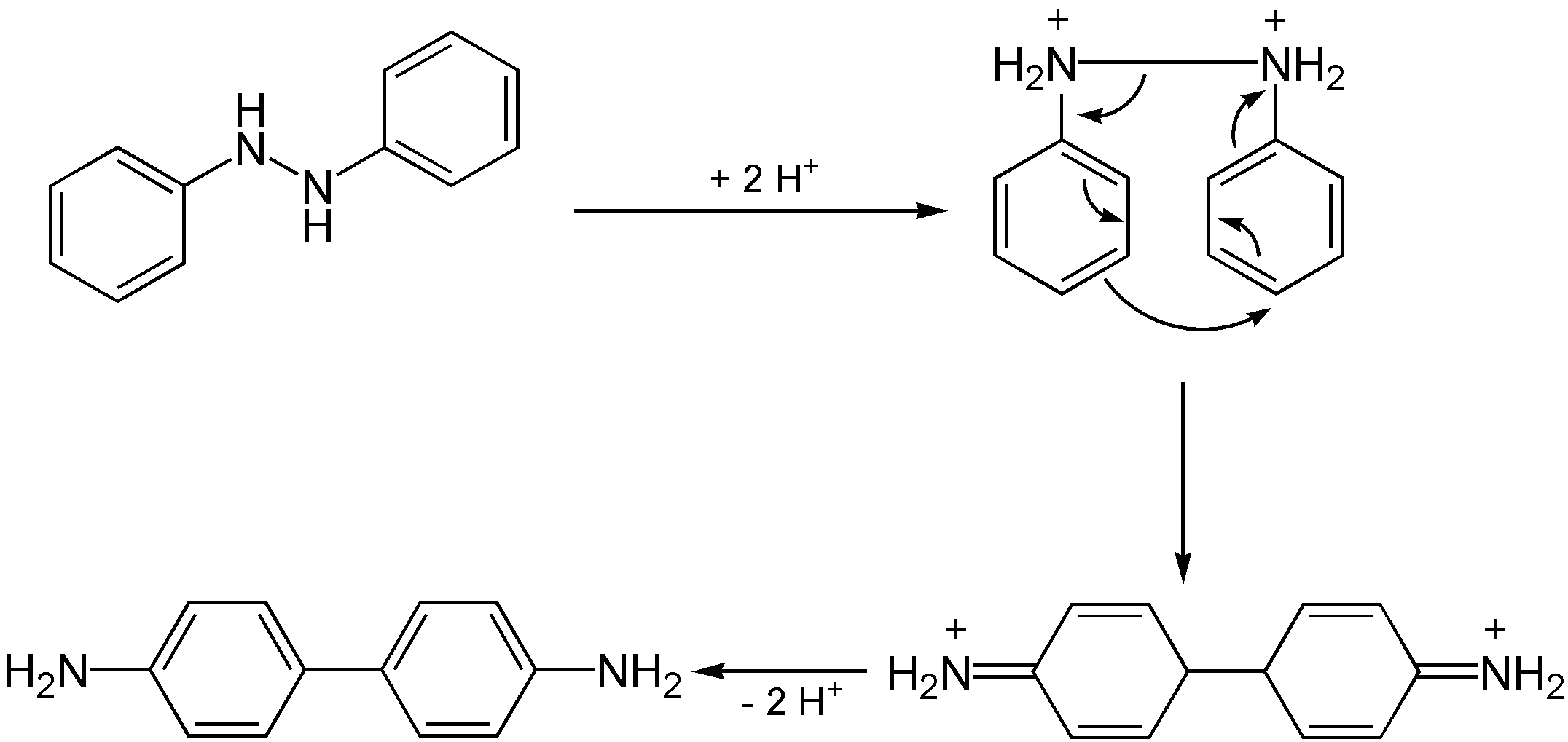

In terms of its physical properties, 4,4'-benzidine is poorly soluble in cold water but can be recrystallized from hot water, where it crystallises as the monohydrate. It is dibasic, the deprotonated species has K_{a} values of 9.3 × 10^{−10} and 5.6 × 10^{−11}. Its solutions react with oxidizing agents to give deeply coloured quinone-related derivatives.

== Applications ==
Conversion of benzidine to the bis(diazonium) salt was once an integral step in the preparation of direct dyes (requiring no mordant). Treatment of this bis(diazonium) salt with 1-aminonaphthalene-4-sulfonic acid gives the once popular congo red dye. In the past, benzidine was used to test for blood. An enzyme in blood causes the oxidation of benzidine to a distinctively blue-coloured derivative. The test for cyanide relies on similar reactivity. Such applications have largely been replaced by methods using phenolphthalein/hydrogen peroxide and luminol.

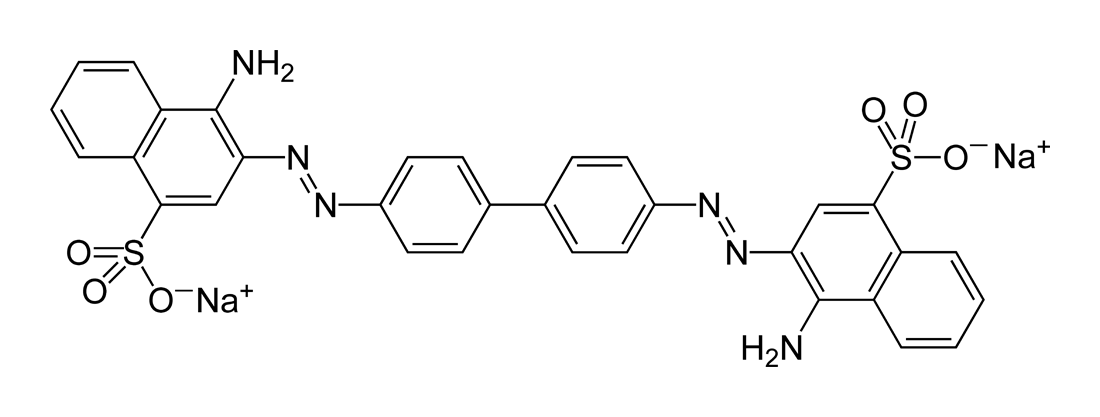
The popular dye congo red is derived from benzidine.

== Related 4,4’-benzidines ==
A variety of derivatives of 4,4’-benzidine are commercially produced on the scale of one to a few thousand kilograms per year, mainly as precursors to dyes and pigments. These derivatives include, in order of scale, the following:

- 3,3'-Dichlorobenzidine
- o-tolidine, 3,3'-dimethyl-4,4’-benzidine
- o-dianisidine (3,3'-dimethoxy-4,4’-benzidine, CAS# 119-90-4, m.p. 133 °C)
- 3,3',4,4'-Tetraamino-diphenyl, precursor to polybenzimidazole fiber.

== Safety ==
As with some other aromatic amines such as 2-naphthylamine, benzidine has been significantly withdrawn from use in most industries because it is so carcinogenic. In August 2010 benzidine dyes were included in the U.S. EPA's List of Chemicals of Concern. The manufacture of Benzidine has been illegal in the UK since at least 2002 under the Control of Substances Hazardous to Health Regulations 2002 (COSHH).
