= Pigment Orange 13 =

Identifiers
| CAS Number | 3520-72-7 |
| 3D model (JSmol) | Interactive image |
| ChemSpider | 30782599 |
| ECHA InfoCard | 100.020.483 |
| EC Number | 222-530-3 |
| PubChem CID | 135565484 |
| UNII | GDF7BXQ79T |
| CompTox Dashboard (EPA) | DTXSID6052031 |
- InChI: InChI=1S/C32H24Cl2N8O2/c1-19-29(31(43)41(39-19)23-9-5-3-6-10-23)37-35-27-15-13-21(17-25(27)33)22-14-16-28(26(34)18-22)36-38-30-20(2)40-42(32(30)44)24-11-7-4-8-12-24/h3-18,43-44H,1-2H3 Key: LVOJOIBIVGEQBP-UHFFFAOYSA-N
- SMILES: CC1=NN(C(=C1N=NC2=C(C=C(C=C2)C3=CC(=C(C=C3)N=NC4=C(N(N=C4C)C5=CC=CC=C5)O)Cl)Cl)O)C6=CC=CC=C6

Properties
| Appearance | orange powder |
- Except where otherwise noted, data are given for materials in their standard state (at 25 °C [77 °F], 100 kPa). Infobox references

Pigment Orange 13 is an organic compound and an azo compound. It is a commercial orange pigment. It is also classified as a diarylide pigment, being derived from 3,3'-dichlorobenzidine. It is closely related to Pigment Orange 34, wherein the two phenyl groups are replaced by p-tolyl groups. Its structure has been confirmed by X-ray crystallography.

Pigment Orange 13 is a popular component of artist's paints and tattoo inks.
