= Pigment Yellow 14 =

Identifiers
CAS Number	5468-75-7
3D model (JSmol)	Interactive image
ChemSpider	21172150
ECHA InfoCard	100.024.354
EC Number	226-789-3
PubChem CID	93006
UNII	586X0864EC
CompTox Dashboard (EPA)	DTXSID9027601
- InChI: InChI=1S/C34H30Cl2N6O4/c1-19-9-5-7-11-27(19)37-33(45)31(21(3)43)41-39-29-15-13-23(17-25(29)35)24-14-16-30(26(36)18-24)40-42-32(22(4)44)34(46)38-28-12-8-6-10-20(28)2/h5-18,31-32H,1-4H3,(H,37,45)(H,38,46) Key: LQZFGPJGXVFSTR-UHFFFAOYSA-N
- SMILES: CC1=CC=CC=C1NC(=O)C(C(=O)C)N=NC2=C(C=C(C=C2)C3=CC(=C(C=C3)N=NC(C(=O)C)C(=O)NC4=CC=CC=C4C)Cl)Cl

Properties
Chemical formula	C_{34}H_{30}Cl_{2}N_{6}O_{4}
Molar mass	657.55 g·mol^{−1}
Appearance	yellow solid
Density	1.41 g/cm^{3}

Hazards
- GHS labelling
Hazard statements	H413
Precautionary statements	P273, P501
- Except where otherwise noted, data are given for materials in their standard state (at 25 °C [77 °F], 100 kPa). Infobox references

Pigment Yellow 14 is an organic compound classified as an azo compound. It is a commercial yellow pigment. It is also classified as a diarylide pigment, being derived from 3,3'-dichlorobenzidine.

== Production ==
Pigment Yellow 14 is produced industrially by tetrazotization of 3,3'-dichlorobenzidine, followed by azo coupling with acetoacetylated o-Toluidine.

== Properties ==
Pigment Yellow 14 is a sparingly flammable, yellow, odorless solid that is practically insoluble in water. It decomposes when heated above 308 °C. It has a crystal structure with the space group P1.

Pigment Yellow 14 is closely related to Pigment Yellow 13, wherein the two xylyl groups are replaced by an ortho tolyl. It is often depicted as an azo (-N=N-) structure, but according to X-ray crystallography closely related compounds exist as the keto-hydrazide tautomers.

== Use ==
Pigment Yellow 14 is used as a pigment (for example in packaging and textile printing).
