= Pigment Yellow 13 =

Identifiers
CAS Number	5102-83-0
3D model (JSmol)	Interactive image
ChemSpider	66158
ECHA InfoCard	100.023.475
EC Number	225-822-9
PubChem CID	73462
UNII	O8RYS681QI
CompTox Dashboard (EPA)	DTXSID0029268
- InChI: InChI=1S/C36H34Cl2N6O4/c1-19-7-11-29(21(3)15-19)39-35(47)33(23(5)45)43-41-31-13-9-25(17-27(31)37)26-10-14-32(28(38)18-26)42-44-34(24(6)46)36(48)40-30-12-8-20(2)16-22(30)4/h7-18,33-34H,1-6H3,(H,39,47)(H,40,48) Key: IAFBRPFISOTXSO-UHFFFAOYSA-N
- SMILES: CC1=CC(=C(C=C1)NC(=O)C(C(=O)C)N=NC2=C(C=C(C=C2)C3=CC(=C(C=C3)N=NC(C(=O)C)C(=O)NC4=C(C=C(C=C4)C)C)Cl)Cl)C

Properties
Chemical formula	C_{36}H_{34}Cl_{2}N_{6}O_{4}
Molar mass	685.61 g·mol^{−1}
Appearance	yellow solid
Density	1.35 g/cm^{3}

Hazards
- GHS labelling
Hazard statements	H413
Precautionary statements	P273, P501
- Except where otherwise noted, data are given for materials in their standard state (at 25 °C [77 °F], 100 kPa). Infobox references

Pigment Yellow 13 is an organic compound and an azo compound. It is a widely used yellow pigment. It is also classified as a diarylide pigment, being derived from 3,3'-dichlorobenzidine.

== Production and characterization ==
Pigment Yellow 13 is produced industrially by tetrazotization of 3,3′-dichlorobenzidine, followed by azo coupling with acetoacetylated Xylidine.

== Properties ==
Pigment Yellow 13 is a combustible, low-flammability yellow solid that is practically insoluble in water. It decomposes upon heating above 330 °C. The crystal structure consists of a layered arrangement with space group P-1 (space group no. 2).

Pigment Yellow 13 is closely related to Pigment Yellow 12, wherein the two xylyl groups are replaced by phenyl and to Pigment Yellow 14 where the xylyl groups are replaced by o-tolyl. It is often depicted as an azo (-N=N-) structure, but according to X-ray crystallography closely related compounds exist as the keto-hydrazide tautomers.

== Use ==
Pigment Yellow 13 is used as a pigment, primarily in offset printing.
