= 3,3'-Diaminobenzidine =

3,3′-Diaminobenzidine

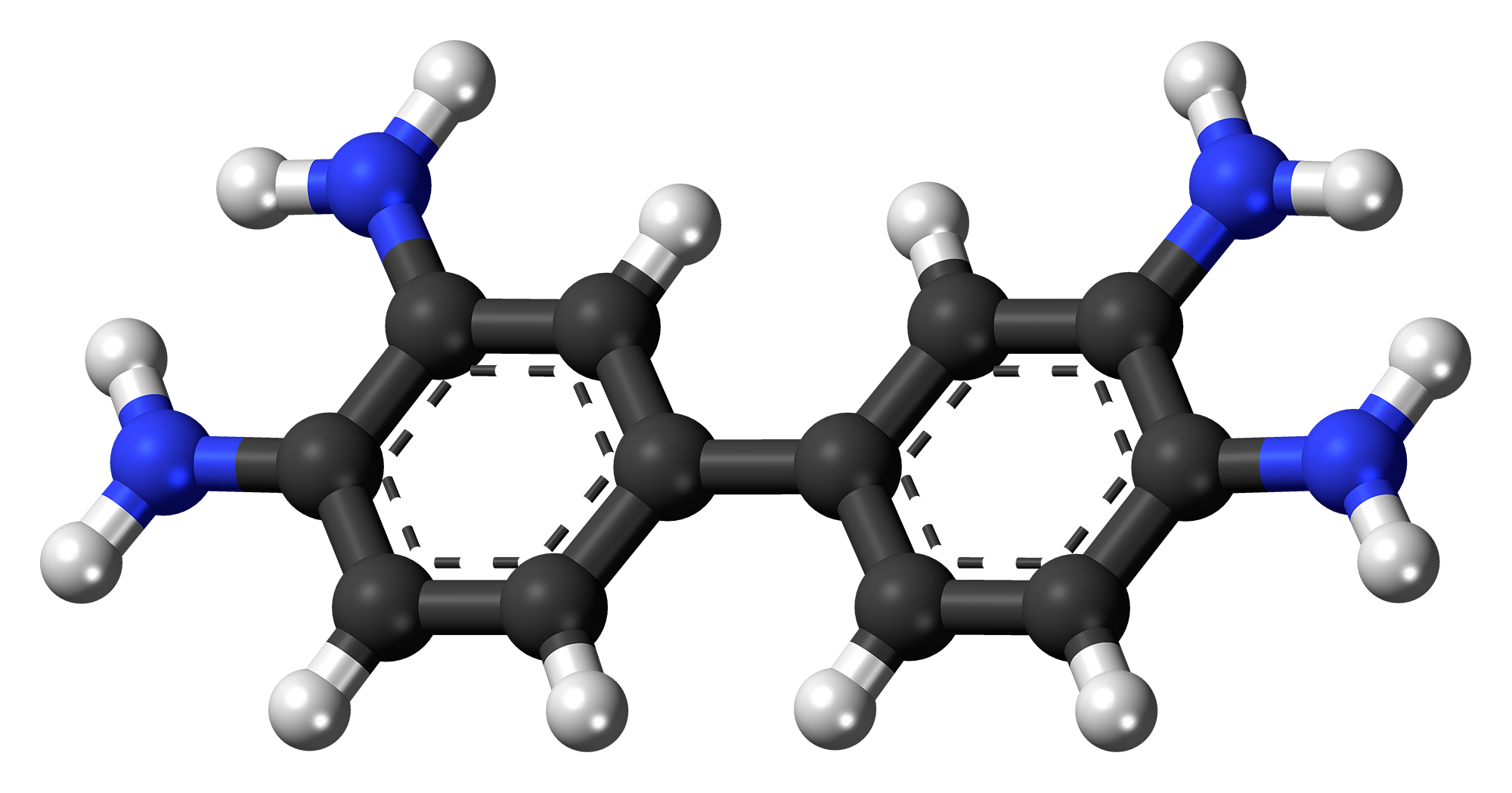

Names
- Preferred IUPAC name [1,1′-Biphenyl]-3,3′,4,4′-tetramine
- Other names 3,3′,4,4′-Biphenyltetramine; 3,3′,4,4′-Tetraamino-diphenyl

Identifiers
CAS Number	91-95-2; 7411-49-6 (4HCl)
3D model (JSmol)	Interactive image
Beilstein Reference	1212988
ChEBI	CHEBI:90994
ChEMBL	ChEMBL1396955
ChemSpider	6804
ECHA InfoCard	100.001.919
EC Number	202-110-6
PubChem CID	7071
RTECS number	DV8750000 DV8753000 (4HCl)
UNII	2RV4T6KHQI; 26I0SJP460 (4HCl)
UN number	2811
CompTox Dashboard (EPA)	DTXSID2036827
- InChI: InChI=1S/C12H14N4/c13-9-3-1-7(5-11(9)15)8-2-4-10(14)12(16)6-8/h1-6H,13-16H2 Key: HSTOKWSFWGCZMH-UHFFFAOYSA-N; InChI=1/C12H14N4/c13-9-3-1-7(5-11(9)15)8-2-4-10(14)12(16)6-8/h1-6H,13-16H2 Key: HSTOKWSFWGCZMH-UHFFFAOYAU
- SMILES: c2(c1cc(N)c(N)cc1)ccc(N)c(N)c2

Properties
Chemical formula	C_{12}H_{14}N_{4} C_{12}H_{18}Cl_{4}N_{4} (4HCl)
Molar mass	214.27 g/mol 360.11 g/mol (4HCl)
Melting point	175 to 177 °C (347 to 351 °F; 448 to 450 K) (280 °C for 4HCl.2H_{2}O)

Hazards
- GHS labelling
Pictograms	(GHS08: Health hazard)
Signal word	Danger
Hazard statements	H341, H350
Precautionary statements	P201, P202, P281, P308+P313, P405, P501
NFPA 704 (fire diamond)	2 1 2
- Lethal dose or concentration (LD, LC)
LD_{50} (median dose)	mouse, oral Acute: 1834 mg/kg.
Safety data sheet (SDS)	External MSDS
- Except where otherwise noted, data are given for materials in their standard state (at 25 °C [77 °F], 100 kPa). verify (what is ?) Infobox references

3,3′-Diaminobenzidine (DAB) is an organic compound with the formula (C_{6}H_{3}(NH_{2})_{2})_{2}. This derivative of benzidine is a precursor to polybenzimidazole, which forms fibers that are renowned for their chemical and thermal stability. As its water-soluble tetrahydrochloride, DAB has been used in immunohistochemical staining of nucleic acids and proteins.

== Structure ==
DAB is symmetric about the central carbon bond between both ring structures. In the crystal, the rings of each molecule are co-planar and the amine units connect molecules to form an intermolecular 3-dimensional hydrogen bond network.

== Preparation ==
Diaminobenzidine, which is commercially available, is prepared by treating 3,3′-dichlorobenzidine with ammonia with a copper catalyst at high temperature and pressure, followed by acidic workup.

An alternate synthesis route involves the diacylation of benzidine with acetic anhydride under basic conditions:

(NH_{2})C_{6}H_{4}C_{6}H_{4}(NH_{2}) + 2 (CH_{3}CO)_{2}O ⟶ (NHCOCH_{3})C_{6}H_{4}C_{6}H_{4}(NHCOCH_{3}) + 2 CH_{3}COOH

The diacetylated compound then undergoes nitration with nitric acid to produce an ortho-dinitro compound due to the ortho-directing acetyl substituents:

(NHCOCH_{3})C_{6}H_{4}C_{6}H_{4}(NHCOCH_{3}) + 2HNO_{3} ⟶ (O_{2}N)(NHCOCH_{3})C_{6}H_{3}C_{6}H_{3}(NHCOCH_{3})(NO_{2}) + 2H_{2}O

The acetyl groups are then removed through saponification:

(O_{2}N)(NHCOCH_{3})C_{6}H_{3}C_{6}H_{3}(NHCOCH_{3})(NO_{2}) + 2NaOH ⟶ (O_{2}N)(NH_{2})C_{6}H_{3}C_{6}H_{3}(NH_{2})(NO_{2}) + 2NaOCOCH_{3}

The dinitrobenzidine compound is then reduced with hydrochloric acid and iron to produce 3,3′-diaminobenzidine:

(O_{2}N)(NH_{2})C_{6}H_{3}C_{6}H_{3}(NH_{2})(NO_{2}) + 12HCl + 6Fe^{0} ⟶ (NH_{2})_{2}C_{6}H_{3}C_{6}H_{3}(NH_{2})_{2} + 6FeCl_{2} + 4H_{2}O

The reduction of the dinitrobenzidine compound can also proceed with tin(II) chloride instead of iron powder or with sodium dithionite in methanol.

== Applications ==
In its main application, DAB is the precursor to polybenzimidazole.

Diaminobenzidine is oxidized by hydrogen peroxide in the presence of hemoglobin to give a dark-brown color. This color change is used to detect fingerprints in blood. The solubility of DAB in water allows for adaptability compared to other detection solutions which use toxic solvents. Improperly prepared tissue samples may give false positives. In research, this reaction is used to stain cells that were prepared with hydrogen peroxidase enzyme, following common immunocytochemistry protocols. Relevant to Alzheimer's disease, Aβ protein amyloid plaques are targeted by a primary antibody, and subsequently by a secondary antibody, which is conjugated with a peroxidase enzyme. This will bind DAB as a substrate and oxidize it, producing an easily observable brown color. Plaques can then be quantified for further evaluation. One other method uses complexes of injected biocytin with avidin or streptavidin, biotin, and then peroxidase.
