= Pigment Yellow 83 =

Names
- Other names Enceprint Yellow 1780, Homapol Yellow PO-227

Identifiers
CAS Number	5567-15-7
3D model (JSmol)	Interactive image
ChemSpider	20428
ECHA InfoCard	100.024.491
EC Number	226-939-8
PubChem CID	21733
UNII	67HO7X7FV3
CompTox Dashboard (EPA)	DTXSID1021453
- InChI: InChI=1S/C36H32Cl4N6O8/c1-17(47)33(35(49)41-27-15-29(51-3)23(39)13-31(27)53-5)45-43-25-9-7-19(11-21(25)37)20-8-10-26(22(38)12-20)44-46-34(18(2)48)36(50)42-28-16-30(52-4)24(40)14-32(28)54-6/h7-16,33-34H,1-6H3,(H,41,49)(H,42,50)/b45-43+,46-44+ Key: NKXPXRNUMARIMZ-MWOVFPFUSA-N
- SMILES: COc1cc(Cl)c(OC)cc1NC(=O)C(C(=O)C)/N=Nc2ccc(cc2Cl)-c3cc(Cl)c(cc3)/N=N/C(C(=O)C)C(=O)Nc4cc(OC)c(Cl)cc4OC

Properties
Chemical formula	C_{36}H_{32}Cl_{4}N_{6}O_{8}
Molar mass	818.49 g·mol^{−1}
Appearance	Yellow solid
Density	1.32 g/cm^{3}
- Except where otherwise noted, data are given for materials in their standard state (at 25 °C [77 °F], 100 kPa). Infobox references

Color Index Pigment Yellow 83 is an organic compound that is classified as a diarylide pigment. It is used as a yellow colorant.

== Production ==
The compound is produced industrially from three components: Treatment of 2,5-dimethoxy-4-chloroaniline with diketene gives an acetoacetylated aniline. This compound is then coupled to the bisdiazonium salt obtained from 3,3'-dichlorobenzidine.

== Properties ==
Pigment Yellow 83 is a slightly flammable yellow solid that is practically insoluble in water. It decomposes when heated above 300 °C. It exhibits a crystal structure belonging to the space group P21/c or space group Pc.

As confirmed by X-ray crystallography, the compound exists as a bis(keto-hydrazide) tautomer, not a true diazo compound.

== Use ==
Pigment Yellow 83 is used, for example, as a reddish-yellow pigment in printing inks and plastics.
