= 3,3'-Dichlorobenzidine =

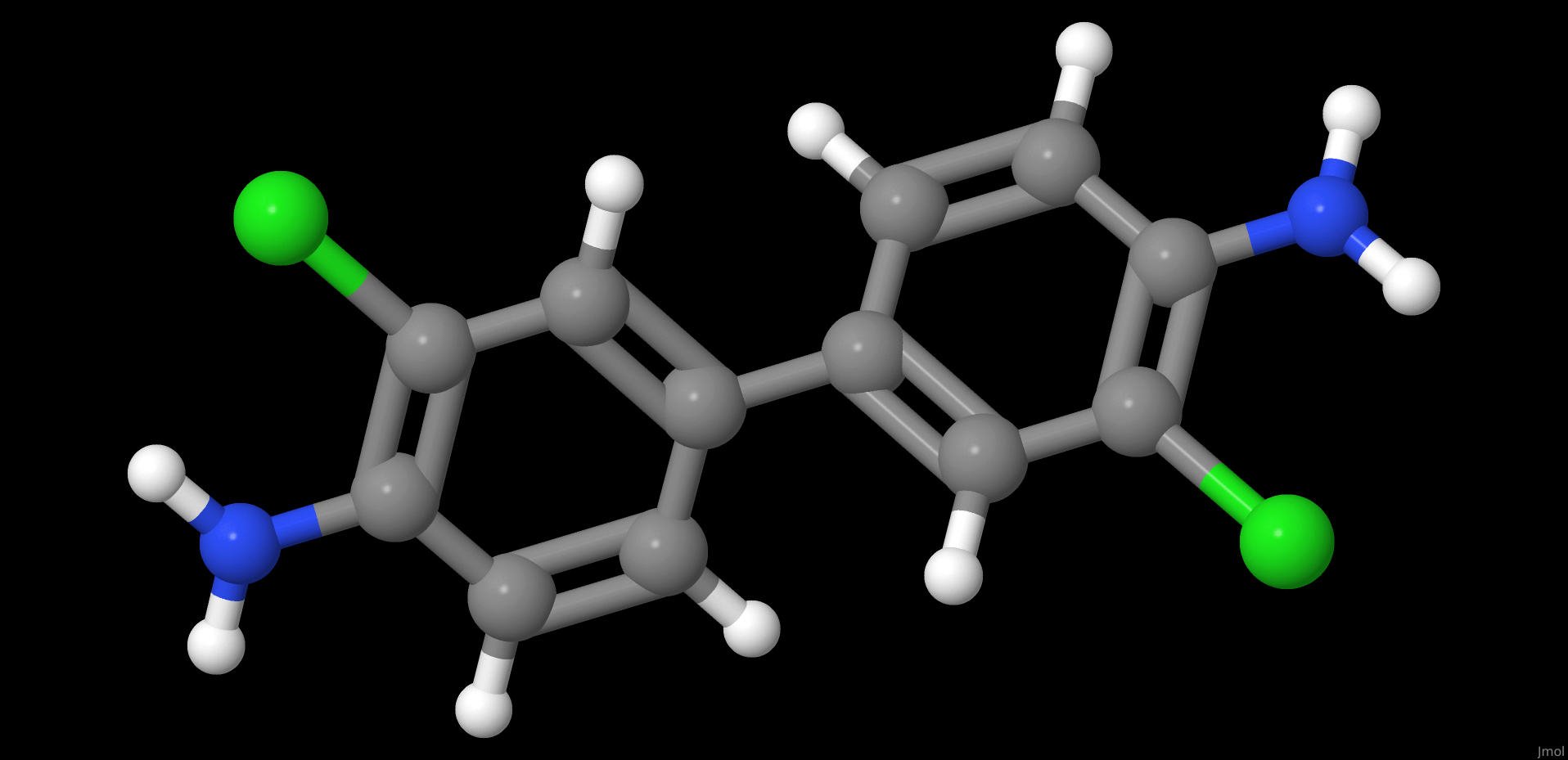

Names
- Preferred IUPAC name 3,3′-Dichloro[1,1′-biphenyl]-4,4′-diamine
- Other names 4-(4-Amino-3-chlorophenyl)-2-chloroaniline; 4,4′-Diamino-3,3′-dichlorobiphenyl o,o'-Dichlorobenzidine; 3,3′-Dichlorobiphenyl-4,4′-diamine; 3,3′-Dichloro-4,4′-biphenyldiamine; 3,3′-Dichloro-4,4′-diaminobiphenyl

Identifiers
CAS Number	91-94-1
3D model (JSmol)	Interactive image
ChEMBL	ChEMBL314470
ChemSpider	6803
ECHA InfoCard	100.001.918
KEGG	C19225
PubChem CID	7070
UNII	1SDI2328UX
CompTox Dashboard (EPA)	DTXSID6020432
- InChI: InChI=1S/C12H10Cl2N2/c13-9-5-7(1-3-11(9)15)8-2-4-12(16)10(14)6-8/h1-6H,15-16H2 Key: HUWXDEQWWKGHRV-UHFFFAOYSA-N; InChI=1/C12H10Cl2N2/c13-9-5-7(1-3-11(9)15)8-2-4-12(16)10(14)6-8/h1-6H,15-16H2 Key: HUWXDEQWWKGHRV-UHFFFAOYAF
- SMILES: Clc2cc(c1ccc(N)c(Cl)c1)ccc2N

Properties
Chemical formula	C_{12}H_{10}Cl_{2}N_{2}
Molar mass	253.13 g/mol
Appearance	Gray or purple crystalline solid
Melting point	132 to 133 °C (270 to 271 °F; 405 to 406 K)
Boiling point	402 °C (756 °F; 675 K)
Solubility in water	0.07% (15°C)

Hazards
- Occupational safety and health (OHS/OSH)
Main hazards	Potential carcinogen
- NIOSH (US health exposure limits)
PEL (Permissible)	carcinogen
REL (Recommended)	Ca
IDLH (Immediate danger)	Ca [N.D.]
- Except where otherwise noted, data are given for materials in their standard state (at 25 °C [77 °F], 100 kPa). verify (what is ?) Infobox references

3,3'-Dichlorobenzidine is a chlorinated aromatic amine derived from benzidine. It is widely used in the production of diarylide yellow pigments used in the production of printing inks. Its use in the production of dyes has been largely discontinued because of concerns about carcinogenicity.

== Properties and the market ==
3,3'-Dichlorobenzidine is a crystalline solid soluble in alcohol, benzene, diethyl ether, and glacial acetic acid, but difficultly soluble in dilute hydrochloric acid and water. It exists in gray-to-purple needle-like crystals. Commercial powder samples may also be light-brown or violet.

This compound is often confused with its dihydrochloride salt, even in scientific literature. 3,3'-Dichlorobenzidine dihydrochloride is sparingly soluble in water and readily soluble in alcohol. It is marketed in the form of a colorless to pale gray crystalline powder. Both the commercial 3,3'-dichlorobenzidine and its hydrochloride usually contain 5 to 30% of water.

The so-called urethane quality 3,3'-dichlorobenzidine is anhydrous and free of hydrochloric acid. However, some sources dispute the very existence of the free base on the market and believe the dihydrochloride salt to be the only form available commercially.

== Preparation and reactions ==
3,3'-Dichlorobenzidine is prepared in two steps from 2-nitrochlorobenzene. The first step involves reduction with zinc in base to afford 2,2'-dichlorodiphenylhydrazine. This intermediate undergoes the benzidine rearrangement to afford 3,3'-dichlorobenzidine.

Aqueous solutions of 3,3'-dichlorobenzidine degrade in light to monochloro derivative. It undergoes chlorination (for example in water treatment plants) to give the tetrachloro derivative.

The most widely practiced reaction of 3,3'-dichlorobenzidine is its double diazotization. This bis(diazo) intermediate is then coupled to derivatives of acetoacetylaminobenzene, CH_{3}C(O)CH_{2}C(O)NHAr (Ar = aryl group). In this way, the following commercial yellow diarylide pigments are produced: Pigment Yellow 12, Pigment Yellow 13, Pigment Yellow 14, Pigment Yellow 17, Pigment Yellow 55, Pigment Yellow 63, Pigment Yellow 81, and Pigment Yellow 83. Pigment Orange 13 is yet another commercial product.

Structure of Pigment Yellow 12, which is derived from dichlorobenzidine.

== Safety ==
3,3'-Dichlorobenzidine is considered a carcinogen. This compound has been shown to increase the incidence of tumors in animals. Because it is structurally similar to benzidine, a known carcinogen, it is believed that it may share a similar mechanism in causing bladder cancer in humans.
