= Amitraz =

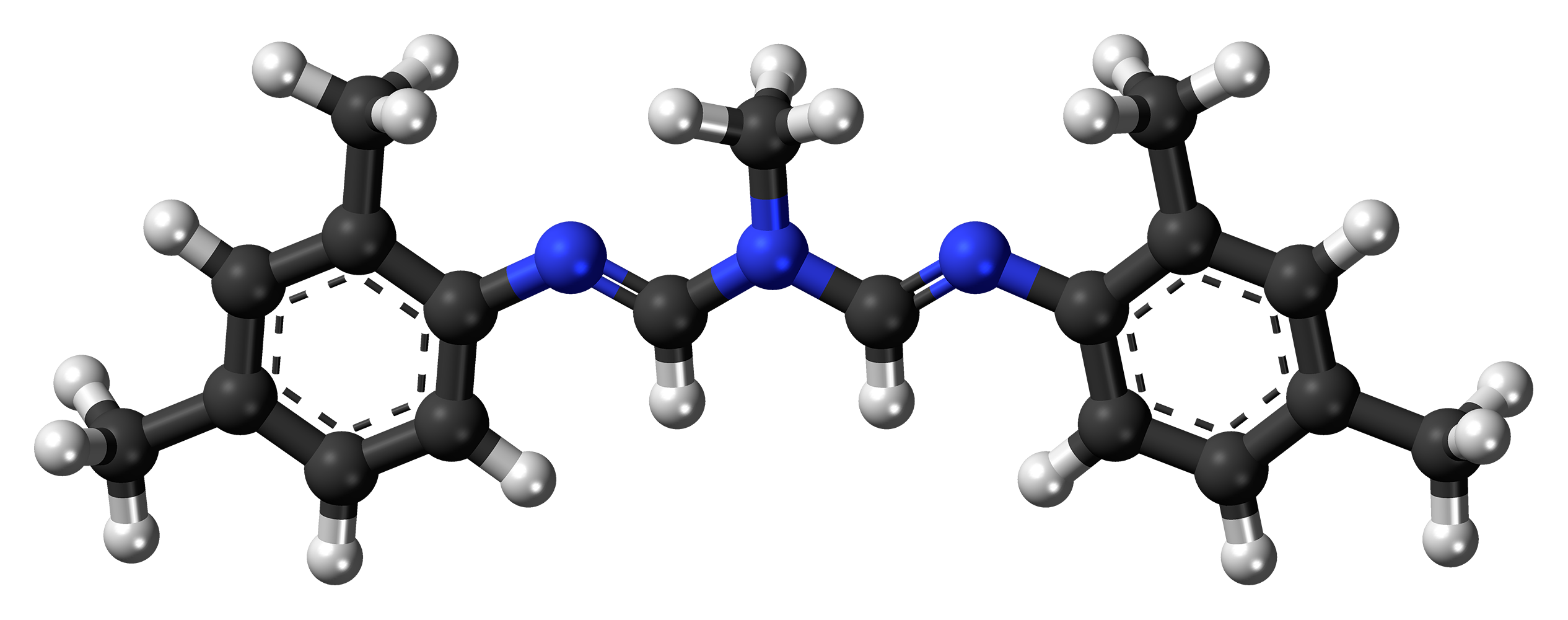

Names
- IUPAC name N,N'-[(Methylimino)dimethylidyne]di-2,4-xylidine

Identifiers
CAS Number	33089-61-1
3D model (JSmol)	Interactive image
ChEBI	CHEBI:2665
ChEMBL	ChEMBL1365675
ChemSpider	33405
ECHA InfoCard	100.046.691
KEGG	D02380
PubChem CID	36324
UNII	33IAH5017S
CompTox Dashboard (EPA)	DTXSID5023871
- InChI: InChI=1S/C19H23N3/c1-14-6-8-18(16(3)10-14)20-12-22(5)13-21-19-9-7-15(2)11-17(19)4/h6-13H,1-5H3/b20-12+,21-13+ Key: QXAITBQSYVNQDR-ZIOPAAQOSA-N; InChI=1/C19H23N3/c1-14-6-8-18(16(3)10-14)20-12-22(5)13-21-19-9-7-15(2)11-17(19)4/h6-13H,1-5H3/b20-12+,21-13+ Key: QXAITBQSYVNQDR-ZIOPAAQOBL
- SMILES: N(=C/N(\C=N\c1ccc(cc1C)C)C)\c2ccc(cc2C)C

Properties
Chemical formula	C_{19}H_{23}N_{3}
Molar mass	293.41 g/mol
Melting point	86 to 87 °C (187 to 189 °F; 359 to 360 K)
Solubility in water	Insoluble
Vapor pressure	2.6 × 10^{−6} mmHg

Pharmacology
ATCvet code	QP53AD01 (WHO)
Legal status	AU: S6 (Poison)
- Except where otherwise noted, data are given for materials in their standard state (at 25 °C [77 °F], 100 kPa). verify (what is ?) Infobox references

Amitraz (development code BTS27419) is a non-systemic acaricide and insecticide and has also been described as a scabicide. It was first synthesized by the Boots Co. in England in 1969. Amitraz has been found to have an insect repellent effect, works as an insecticide and also as a pesticide synergist. Its effectiveness is traced back on alpha-adrenergic agonist activity, interaction with octopamine receptors of the central nervous system and inhibition of monoamine oxidases and prostaglandin synthesis. Therefore, it leads to overexcitation and consequently paralysis and death in insects. Because amitraz is less harmful to mammals, amitraz is among many other purposes best known as insecticide against mite- or tick-infestation of dogs. It is also widely used in the beekeeping industry as a control for the Varroa destructor mite, although there are reports of resistance.

== Use ==
Amitraz is particularly effective against acarids, but it is used as a pesticide in many different fields. Therefore, amitraz is available in many different forms, such as a wettable powder, an emulsifiable concentrate, a soluble concentrate/liquid, and an impregnated collar (for dogs). It is characterized as an insect repellent, insecticide, and pesticide synergist. These are the properties which make it especially useful as a pesticide:

- The repellent effect causes insects to turn away from their target as this is treated with amitraz.
- It acts as an insecticide, which means that it can be used to control insects that are directly or indirectly harmful to man.
- As a pesticide synergist it also increases the effect of some other pesticides if they are combined with amitraz.

These can be traced back to the mechanisms of action, which lead to a wide field of effects, including direct lethality, excitant-repellant behavioral effects, and chemosterilization for the target species. In addition, it generally causes low damage to nontarget species, which is one of the advantages of amitraz. Furthermore, amitraz is especially effective against insects such as spider mites and ticks in their juvenile and resistant forms. For agricultural purposes amitraz is primarily used to control the pear psylla (Cacopsylla pyricola) on Oregon pear crops and whiteflies and mites on cotton or pear crops. It's also applied to pome fruit, citrus fruit, cotton, stone fruit, bush fruit, strawberries, hops, cucurbits, aubergines, capsicums, tomatoes and ornamental plants to control all stages of tetranychid and eriophyid mites, pear suckers, scale insects, mealybugs, whiteflies, aphids and eggs and first instar larvae of lepidoptera. To apply amitraz, various techniques can be used such as an airblast and concentrate spray to pears or by ground boom and aircraft to cotton. Territorial differences in amitraz use depend on the species of mites that infest the crops/trees/etc., the local practice, and the number and size of the pear trees. An infestation e.g. by Tetranychus spp. requires higher rates of amitraz. Taking those factors into consideration the application volumes of amitraz have been standardized in terms of maximum spray concentration and in the rate of amitraz per hectare.

Besides its application as pesticide on plants, amitraz is also used as an animal ectoparasiticide on cattle, goats, sheep, pigs and dogs. In these applications, it is exclusively applied externally. It achieves special efficiency against mites (first of all Demodex canis), but it also works against lice, flies, and all development stages of ticks. In combination with additional agents it can be used against flea-infestation as well. For the treatment of dogs amitraz is available as a collar or as a spray- or wash-solution and has an immediate effect against tick infestation as well as a preventive effect. In some countries amitraz emulsions are also applied to treat demodicosis of cats or dogs, an exceeding infestation of mites of the family Demodicidae. For the treatment of cattle, sheep, goats and pigs amitraz is available as spray- or wash-solution, to treat or prevent infestations by mites, lice, flies and ticks. Thereby pigs and cattle should be sprayed and sheep and goats bathed. Other animal species — horses or Chihuahuas, for example — should not be treated with amitraz because adverse effects may occur.

== Adverse effects ==
Adverse effects in mammals are caused by amitraz' alpha-adrenergic agonist activity. Symptoms can include low blood pressure and pulse, hypothermia, lethargy, absence of appetite, vomiting, increased blood sugar and digestive problems. Furthermore, skin- or mucosa-irritations may occur in dogs as a response to an amitraz containing collar. This can lead to itching, eczema, alopecia or conjunctivitis.

== Toxicity ==
=== Human toxicity ===
In 2006 the United States Environmental Protection Agency (USEPA) re-assessed the classification for amitraz to a non-quantifiable "Suggestive Evidence of Carcinogenicity" descriptor, and in 2013 determined that quantification of risk using a non-linear approach for amitraz will adequately account for all chronic toxicity, including carcinogenicity, that could result from exposure to amitraz and its metabolites. Accidental exposure of men to greater amounts of amitraz can lead to death due to respiratory failure, mainly after oral uptake or inhalation. In Turkey during 1989, 41 cases of deadly amitraz intoxications have been detected. The observed toxic dose in about 50% of these patients has been 0.3 g to 1.25 g of 12.5% amitraz formulations and 0.5 to 2 g of 20% formulations. The remaining patients took doses up to 10 g. Other frequently occurring symptoms after massive amitraz intoxication are CNS depression, respiratory depression, miosis, hypothermia, hyperglycemia, loss of consciousness, vomiting and bradycardia.

=== Treatment ===
In case of an amitraz overdose in humans atipamezole or yohimbine, which act as α2-antagonists, can be used as antidote. Initially it is important to remove the patient from the amitraz contaminated area. When amitraz has been inhaled the patient should first get respiratory protection. Additionally the patient should be supplied with 4 L oxygen per minute. In case of an intoxication via skin-contact, contaminated clothes should be removed first. Affected areas need to be washed with water. If eyes have been exposed to amitraz, anesthesia should be administered and the eyes carefully washed. After the oral intake of amitraz it is important to make the patient drink ca. 0.3 L water to reduce amitraz' irritating effect on the gullet. Furthermore, it is important to prevent the patient as much as possible from vomiting, to reduce the risk of further aspiration of amitraz. Subsequently, the patient need to be observed for at least 24 hours to ensure that the symptoms do not recur.

=== Non-human toxicity ===
Species	Method of administration	Dose
Rat	oral	400 mg/kg
Rat	dermal	>1600 mg/kg
Rat	intraperitoneal	800 mg/kg
Mouse	oral	1600 mg/kg
Mouse	intraperitoneal	>100 mg/kg
Rabbit	oral	>100 mg/kg
Rabbit	dermal	>200 mg/kg
Baboon	oral	150–250 mg/kg
Dog	oral	100 mg/kg
Guinea pig	oral	400–800 mg/kg

== Synthesis ==
Since its discovery by Boots Co. in 1969 three main synthesis routes for amitraz has been developed, which stand out in terms of facility and generality.

Route 1: 2,4-Xylidine + triethyl orthoformate + methylamine (imine formation/amine formation):

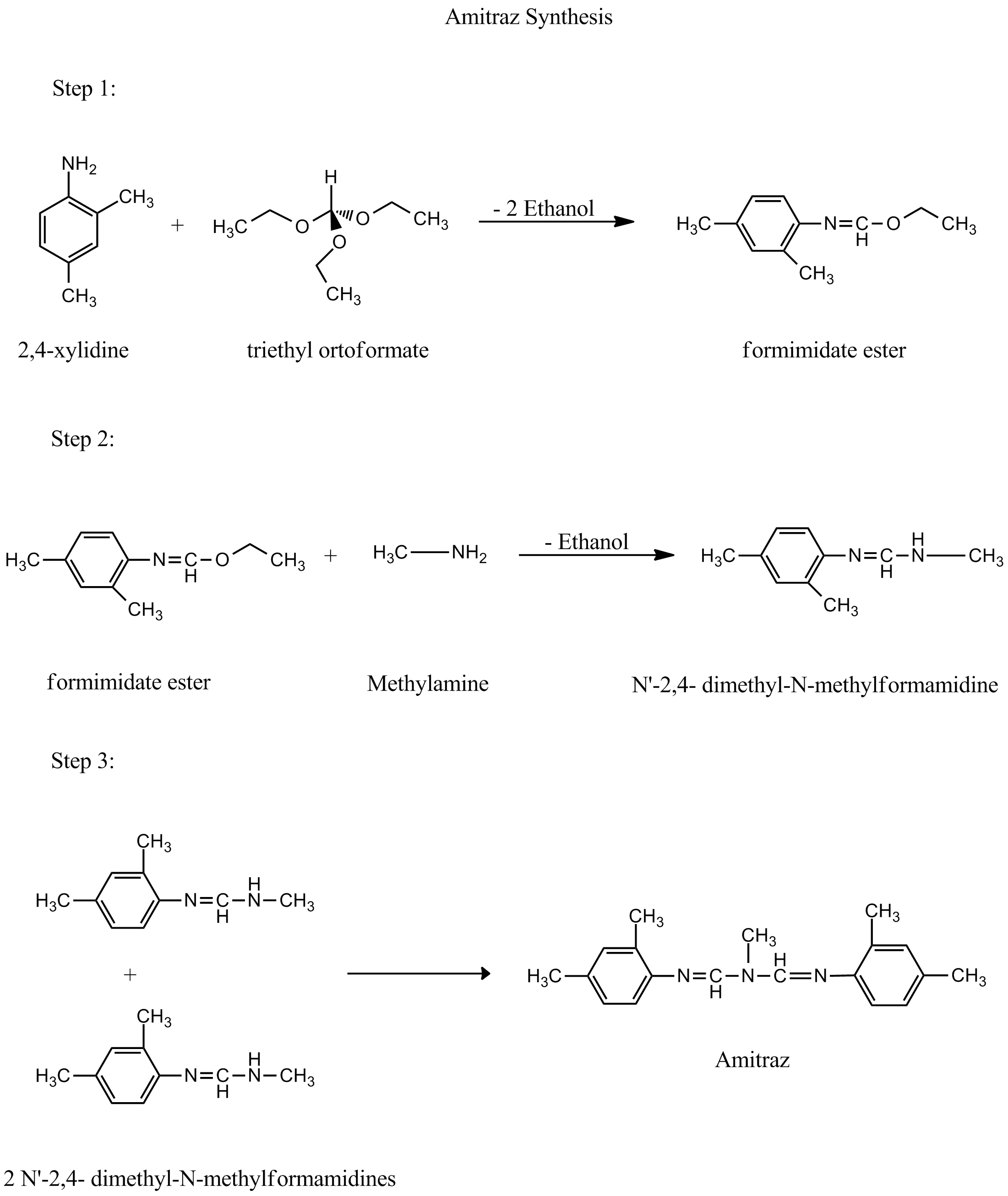
Figure 1; Amitraz Synthesis Route 1

One of the first amitraz-manufacturing plants used this reaction scheme (figure 1). Therefore, the reactions has been carried out in an enclosed area, to recycle unused reagents. The first step of this route is the reaction of an aniline with triethyl orthoformate. In the named manufacturing plant 2,4-Xylidine has been used as the aniline. The reaction yields an intermediate formimidate ester. In the next step methylamine is added, which combines with the formimidate ester to yield the desired formamidine. As the formamidines forms, ethanol is set free from the chemical reaction and is recycled. This is probably the most suitable method for the synthesis of amitraz, because this second step yields N′-2,4-dimethyl-N-methylformamidine. The free -NH groups of these molecules react with each other to finally yield amitraz. The last steps of the manufacturing process include crystalisation out from isopropyl alcohol, filtering and drying. These last steps need to be carried out by instructed personnel, who wear full protective clothing with a positive-pressure breathing apparatus.

Route 2: Substituted formamide + aniline:

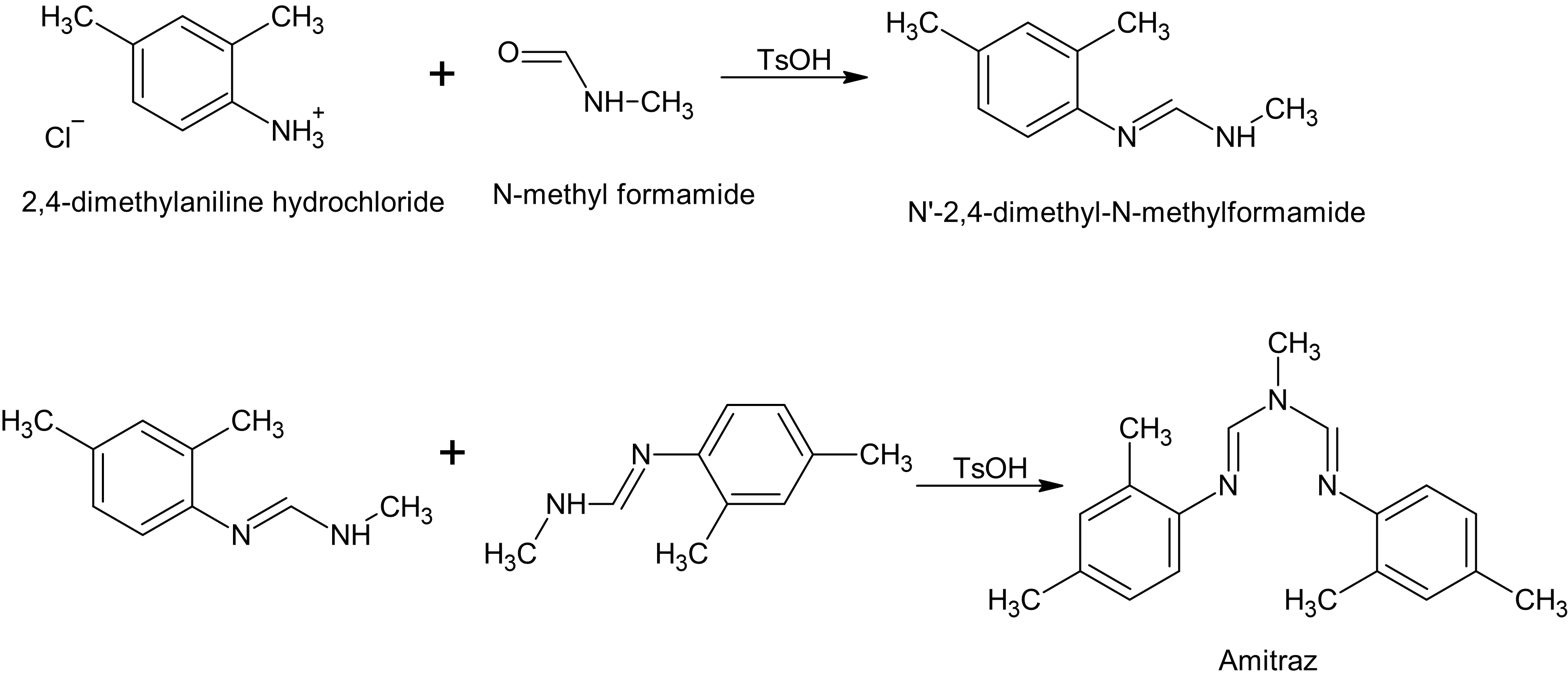
Figure 2; Amitraz Synthesis Route 2

The first step of this synthesis route to an N-arylformamidine as amitraz is the reaction of a substituted formamide, usually a dialkylformamide, with an aniline. To gain amitraz N-methyl formamide and 2,4 dimethyl aniline hydrochloride can be used (figure 2). This reaction is catalyzed by the presence of acid halides, such as POCl_{3}, SOCl_{2}, COCl_{2}, or an arylsulfonylhalide, as p-toluene sulfonyl chloride (figure 2). This yields an intermediate, which reacts further as its catalyzed by p-toluene acid to N, N'-[(methylimino) dimethylidyne] di-2,4-xylidine (amitraz). Alternatively, the aniline in the first step can be replaced by an arylformamide. In addition the replacement of the dialkylformamide with an N-alkylpyrrolidone can be used to obtain products of the clenpyrin group from this reaction.

route 3: arylisocyanate + formamide:

To achieve this reaction a mixture a suitable arylisocyanate and formamide is heated and marked by the evolution of CO_{2}, to yield the desired formamidine.

== Metabolism ==
Since amitraz most common use is as a pesticide, it is important to consider that between animals and plants often different pathways for biotransformation occur. Most animal species, including humans can metabolize amitraz rapidly to form six metabolites during biotransformation, N-methyl-N′-(2,4-xylyl)formamide, Form- 2'4'xylidine, 4-N-Methyl-formidoyl) amino-meta-toluix acid, 4-Formamido-meta-toluic acid, 4- Acetamido- meta-toluic acid and 4- Amino- meta- toluic acid.

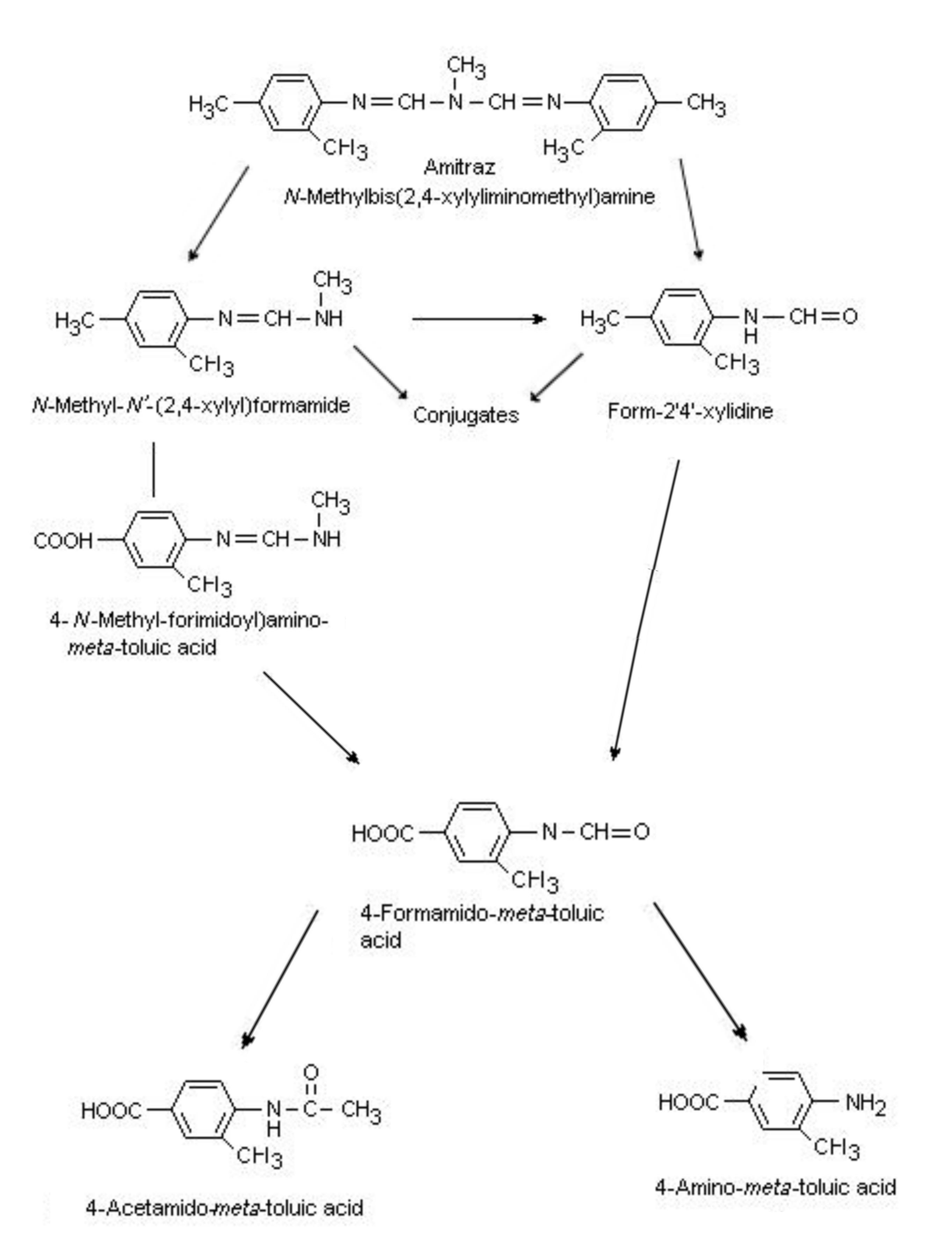
Figure 3; Amitraz Metabolism in Animals

In rats the metabolic pathway (figure 3) has been examined after oral administration of ^{14}C-labelled amitraz, which was found to be effectively metabolized, degraded and excreted to four of the metabolites in urine and six in faeces. The metabolic pathway or rate did not differ between the sexes.

Hornish and Nappier (1983) detected that the metabolic pathway after dermal administration follows the same route of degradation as after oral uptake, because the parent compound, N-methyl- N'-(2,4-xylyl)formamidine and form-2',4'-xylidide were found in urine and blood also after dermal administration. In humans, N-methyl-N-(2,4-xylyl)formamidine, form-2',4'-xylidide, 4-amino- meta-toluic acid, 4-acetamido- meta-toluic and 4-formamido- meta-toluic acids were recognized in the urine as well which indicates for the same or a similar metabolic pathway.

As illustrated in figure 3 the first step is a hydrolysis reaction to N-methyl-N'-(2,4-xylyl)-formamidine, which already can be excreted in the urine but is still pharmacological active. Depending on the dose, the quantity of this metabolite in the urine can vary from 4% at low doses to 23%-38% at high doses (e.g. in case of rats: 1–100 mg per kg body weight). As it isn't excreted it also can be oxidized to 4-N-Methyl-formidoyl)amino-meta-toluic acid, which can be further oxidized to 4-formamido-meta-toluic acid. Form-2,4-xylidine is formed directly by hydrolysis from amitraz or arises from N-methyl- N'-(2,4-xylyl)formamidine. During this early stage of biotransformation N-methyl- N'-(2,4-xylyl) formamidine and Form-2,4-xylidine may already form conjugates. But the major route followed after the formation of Form-2,4-xylidine is the oxidation to 4-formamido-meta-toluic acid, which is further metabolized to its acetyl conjugate, 4-acetamido-meta-toluic acid or 4-amino- meta-toluic acid. 4-formamido- meta-toluic acid and 4-acetamido- meta-toluic acid make 32% of the metabolites found in urine and are detected at any administered dose. Therefore, they are considered as two of the major metabolites in the amitraz pathway. Form-2',4'-xylidide and 4-amino- meta-toluic acid account only for 2% of the total excretion. In insects different metabolites are formed. N-methyl- N'-(2,4-xylyl)formamidine, Form-2,4-xylidine and 4-Amino-meta-toluic acid occur, but in addition several unidentified metabolites were detected, too.

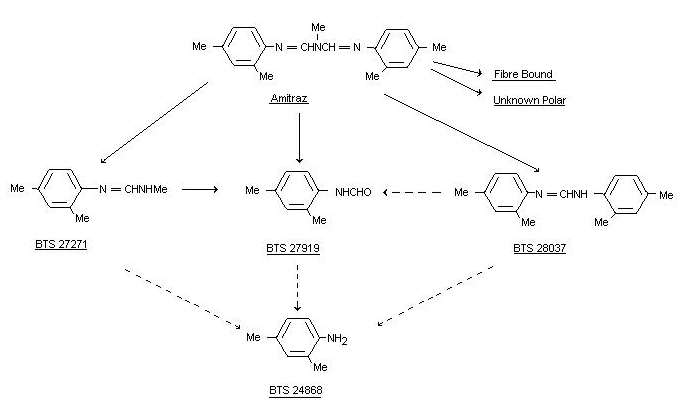
Figure 4; Amitraz Metabolism in Plants

In plants the biotransformation of amitraz proceeds very rapidly. The predominant metabolites detected are N-(2,4-dimethylphenyl)-N'-methylformamidine (BST 27 271) and 2,4-dimethylformanilide (BST 27 919).

N-(2,4-dimethylphenyl)-N'-methylformamidine (BST 27 271), 2,4-dimethylformanilide (BST 27 919) and N,N'-bis-dimethylphenylformamidine (BTS 28 037) result from hydrolysis of amitraz. Thereby N-(2,4-dimethylphenyl)-N'-methylformamidine (BST 27 271) occurs in higher amounts than 2,4-dimethylformanilide (BST 27 919). N-(2,4-dimethylphenyl)-N'-methylformamidine (BST 27 271) can be further metabolized to 2,4-dimethylformanilide (BST 27 919) or 2,4-dimethylaniline (BTS 24 868).

N,N'-bis-dimethylphenylformamidine (BTS 28 037) can be transformed to 2,4-dimethylformanilide (BST 27 919) or directly react to 2,4-dimethylaniline (BTS 24 868), but the exact mechanisms of these biotransformations are not known yet. However, of 2,4-dimethylaniline (BTS 24 868) and N,N'-bis-dimethylphenylformamidine (BTS 28 037) less than 1% has been accounted, which makes them minor metabolites compared to N-(2,4-dimethylphenyl)-N'-methylformamidine (BST 27 271) and 2,4-dimethylformanilide (BST 27 919). Figure 4 shows the suggested amitraz' metabolic pathway in plants.

=== Kinetics ===
The hydrolysis reactions of amitraz strongly depend on the environmental pH. Even though amitraz undergoes hydrolysis reactions at any pH, spectrophotometry, HPLC, and GC-MS studies revealed that pH-depending differences occur, affecting both the sort of reaction-products and the reaction rate. Under basic conditions (pH>6) amitraz is metabolized to 2,4-dimethylphenylformamide. Followed by hydrolysis to 2,4-dimethylaniline, which also benefits from a basic pH. At very acidic pH (pH<3) 2,4-dimethylaniline has been observed as the main degradation product. Under less acidic conditions (pH 3–6) mainly N-(2,4-dimethylphenyl)-N′-methylformamidine and already amounts of 2,4-dimethylphenylformamide occur.

== Mechanism of action ==
Amitraz is used as a pesticide. Therefore, amitraz exposure to humans occurs mainly through inhalation or dermal contact with the compound during its use or production. The toxic effects to humans following on amitraz-uptake include loss of consciousness, vomiting, respiratory failure, miosis, hypothermia, bradycardia, hyperglycemia and central nervous system depression.

The pharmacological activity of amitraz includes different mechanisms of action leading to toxic effects in humans as well as in animals. Many of these effects and most of the effects on humans are caused by its alpha-adrenergic agonist activity. Furthermore, amitraz inhibits prostaglandin synthesis, interacts with the octopamine receptors of the central nervous system and inhibits monoamine oxidases.

Animal studies revealed that damages due to amitraz poisoning can be recovered even after exposure to a potentially lethal dose. This could mean that amitraz' effects are reversible or at least are recoverable. When an amitraz poisoning is lethal, death results from respiratory depression.

=== Alpha-adrenergic agonist activity ===
Amitraz is a central alpha-adrenoreceptor agonist. That means that it selectively stimulates alpha adrenergic receptors, which are metabotropic G-protein-coupled receptors, that are usually targeted by catecholamines. Stimulating these receptors is in great extent the reason for the neurotoxic and preconvulsant effects of amitraz. Xylene present in amitraz formulations additionally induces central nervous system depression. Adrenergic Receptors can be divided into two subclasses, alpha1- and alpha2-adrenergic receptors. To determine whether amitraz interacts with subclass 1 oder subclass 2, subcutaneous injections of amitraz (0.3–3.0 mg/kg) were given to mice. Consequently, a dose-dependent delay of gastrointestinal transit in conscious mice occurs. This effect could be antagonized by alpha2-adrenergic blocking agents, but administration of other antagonists did not reduce the depressant effect on the gastrointestinal transit. So it is suggested that amitraz-induced delay of gastrointestinal transit is mediated by postjunctional alpha2-adrenergic receptors and appears not to involve the activation of β-adrenergic, dopaminergic, serotonergic, histaminergic, cholinergic, GABAergic, or opioid receptors. Besides the neurotoxic effects other clinical effects observed in amitraz poisoning are related to alpha2-adrenergic agonistic activity. Adrenergic receptors are present in many different cells. The activation of these receptors by an agonist as amitraz generally induces a sympathetic response. This leads to an increased heart rate, dilation of the pupils, elevation of blood pressure and blood and energy supply focus on skeletal muscles.

=== Interaction with the octopamine receptor ===
It's thought that the mode of action of amitraz involves the interaction with the neuromodulator octopamine. This interaction is probably the reason for increased nervous activity of ticks as a response on amitraz. Usual activation of the receptors may lead to changes in the concentration of intracellular second messengers such as cyclic nucleotides cyclic AMP (cAMP) and cyclic GMP, inositol-1,4,5-trisphosphate and Ca^{2+}. Influencing this signal transduction system can lead to various events depending on the celltype. Since it has been discovered that the octopamine receptor coding gene is expressed on very high rates in the somata of the honeybee brain, it is suggested that it is involved in the processing of sensory inputs, antennal motor outputs and higher-order brain functions. The amitraz-octopamine receptor interaction restrains these normal functions of the octopamine receptor. Therefore, it is efficient as an insect-pesticide. Still, resistance against amitraz can occur. A mutation can lead to a working version of the octopamine receptor but with an altered pesticide target side. This is probably the case for a very resistant Brazilian and Mexican tick strain, which have two nucleotide substitutions on the octopamine receptor coding gene compared with the Australian strains. A closer understanding of these resistance meachnisms would help to develop more rapid and accurate diagnostic tools for detecting resistance and steer development of alternative acaricides.

=== Inhibition of monoamine oxidases ===
In vitro a monoamine oxidase-inhibiting effect of amitraz has been found. Monoamine oxidases catalyze the oxidative deamination of monoamines and thereby form flavoproteins and inactivate neurotransmitters. However, in vivo it has been observed that only at high doses of amitraz or its main metabolite N-2,4-dimethylphenyl-N-methyl-formamide monoamine oxidase inhibition occurs. In dogs it has been observed that after administration of such a dose an increase in plasma glucose and suppression of insulin occurs.

=== Inhibition of prostaglandin synthesis ===
Like other formamidines amitraz inhibits the synthesis of prostaglandin E2 from arachidonic acid by bovine seminal vesicle microsomes. In a dose of 5 to 80 mg/kg body weight, given intraperitoneally to rats, amitraz reduces yeast-induced fever and antagonizes the carrageenin-induced swelling of the hind paw. Some of the physiological effects of amitraz probably go back to this aspirin-like activity and occur due to inhibition of prostaglandin synthesis.
