= Pigment Yellow 3 =

Names
- Other names: C.I. 11710; C.I. Pigment Yellow 3

Identifiers
CAS Number	6486-23-3
3D model (JSmol)	Interactive image
ChemSpider	21172535
ECHA InfoCard	100.026.687
EC Number	229-355-1
PubChem CID	94326
UNII	L885GOC9B6
CompTox Dashboard (EPA)	DTXSID40863873
- InChI: InChI=1S/C16H12Cl2N4O4/c1-9(23)15(16(24)19-12-5-3-2-4-11(12)18)21-20-13-7-6-10(17)8-14(13)22(25)26/h2-8,15H,1H3,(H,19,24) Key: QTSNFLIDNYOATQ-UHFFFAOYSA-N
- SMILES: CC(=O)C(C(=O)NC1=CC=CC=C1Cl)N=NC2=C(C=C(C=C2)Cl)[N+](=O)[O-]

Properties
Appearance	yellow solid
- Except where otherwise noted, data are given for materials in their standard state (at 25 °C [77 °F], 100 kPa). Infobox references

Pigment Yellow 3 is a commercial colorant, sometimes classified as an arylide yellow. In terms of color and structure, it is closely related to Pigment Yellow 1, where the anilide component lacks substituents and the diazo component has methyl in place of chloro.
