= Pigment Yellow 81 =

Names
- Other names Benzidine Yellow 10G, Sanyo Pigment Yellow 8105

Identifiers
CAS Number	22094-93-5
3D model (JSmol)	Interactive image
ChemSpider	80866
ECHA InfoCard	100.040.691
EC Number	244-776-0
PubChem CID	89597
UNII	DGH1X24C9Z
CompTox Dashboard (EPA)	DTXSID20865032
- InChI: InChI=1S/C36H32Cl4N6O4/c1-17-7-9-29(19(3)11-17)41-35(49)33(21(5)47)45-43-31-15-25(37)23(13-27(31)39)24-14-28(40)32(16-26(24)38)44-46-34(22(6)48)36(50)42-30-10-8-18(2)12-20(30)4/h7-16,33-34H,1-6H3,(H,41,49)(H,42,50)/b45-43+,46-44+ Key: GPWXTTPSHZOIKO-MWOVFPFUSA-N
- SMILES: Cc1cc(C)ccc1NC(=O)C(C(=O)C)/N=N/c2cc(Cl)c(cc2Cl)-c3cc(Cl)c(cc3Cl)/N=N/C(C(=O)C)C(=O)Nc4ccc(C)cc4C

Properties
Chemical formula	C_{36}H_{32}Cl_{4}N_{6}O_{4}
Molar mass	754.49
Appearance	yellow solid
- Except where otherwise noted, data are given for materials in their standard state (at 25 °C [77 °F], 100 kPa). Infobox references

Pigment Yellow 81 is an organic compound that is classified as a diarylide pigment. It is used as a yellow colorant.

The compound is synthesized from three components. Treatment of 2,4-dimethylaniline with diketene gives an acetoacetylated aniline. This compound is then coupled to the bisdiazonium salt obtained from tetrachlorobenzidine.
