= Pigment Yellow 12 =

Names
- Other names Benzidine yellow, Diarylanilide Yellow

Identifiers
CAS Number	6358-85-6
3D model (JSmol)	Interactive image
ChemSpider	7844696
ECHA InfoCard	100.026.170
EC Number	228-787-8
PubChem CID	186342
UNII	N52TUS5TRY
CompTox Dashboard (EPA)	DTXSID1021451
- InChI: InChI=1S/C32H26Cl2N6O4/c1-19(41)29(31(43)35-23-9-5-3-6-10-23)39-37-27-15-13-21(17-25(27)33)22-14-16-28(26(34)18-22)38-40-30(20(2)42)32(44)36-24-11-7-4-8-12-24/h3-18,29-30H,1-2H3,(H,35,43)(H,36,44) Key: GNCOVOVCHIHPHP-UHFFFAOYSA-N
- SMILES: CC(=O)C(C(=O)NC1=CC=CC=C1)N=NC2=C(C=C(C=C2)C3=CC(=C(C=C3)N=NC(C(=O)C)C(=O)NC4=CC=CC=C4)Cl)Cl

Properties
Chemical formula	C_{32}H_{26}Cl_{2}N_{6}O_{4}
Molar mass	629.50 g·mol^{−1}
Appearance	Yellow solid
Density	1.22
Melting point	320 °C (608 °F; 593 K)
Solubility in water	1mg/ml

Hazards
- GHS labelling
Hazard statements	H412
Precautionary statements	P273, P501
- Except where otherwise noted, data are given for materials in their standard state (at 25 °C [77 °F], 100 kPa). Infobox references

Pigment Yellow 12 is an organic compound and an azo compound. It is a widely used yellow pigment. It is also classified as a diarylide pigment, being derived from 3,3'-dichlorobenzidine. It is closely related to Pigment Yellow 13, wherein the two phenyl groups are replaced by 2,4-xylyl. According to X-ray crystallography, the molecule is nearly planar and exists as the keto-hydrazide tautomer.
