= Polybenzimidazole =

polybenzimidazole
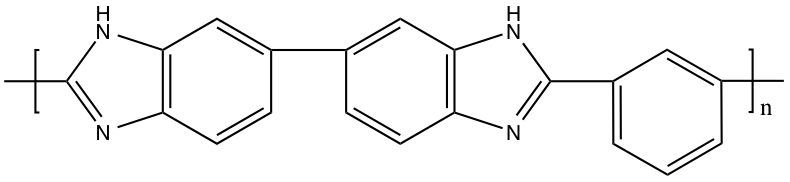

Identifiers
CAS Number	32075-68-6
ChemSpider	none

Properties
Chemical formula	(C_{20}H_{12}N_{4})_{n}
Molar mass	Variable 308.34 (repeating unit)
- Except where otherwise noted, data are given for materials in their standard state (at 25 °C [77 °F], 100 kPa). Infobox references

Polybenzimidazole (PBI, short for poly[2,2’-(m-phenylen)-5,5’-bisbenzimidazole]) fiber is a synthetic fiber with a very high decomposition temperature. It does not exhibit a melting point, does not readily ignite, and has exceptional thermal and chemical stability. It was first discovered in 1961, by American polymer chemist Carl Shipp Marvel in the pursuit of new materials with superior stability, retention of stiffness, and toughness at elevated temperature. Due to its high stability, polybenzimidazole is used to fabricate high-performance protective apparel such as firefighter's gear, astronaut space suits, high temperature protective gloves, welders’ apparel and aircraft wall fabrics. Polybenzimidazole has been applied as a membrane in fuel cells.

== History ==
=== Discovery ===
Brinker and Robinson first reported aliphatic polybenzimidazoles in 1949. However the discovery of aromatic polybenzimidazole, which shows excellent physical and chemical properties, was generally credited to Carl Shipp Marvel in the 1950s. The Material Laboratory of Wright Patterson Air Force Base approached Marvel. They were looking for materials suitable for drogue parachutes which could tolerate short-time mechanical stress. However, the thermal resistance of all known filaments at that time was inadequate. The original search concentrated on aromatic condensation polymers but the amide linkage proved to be weak link for the aim of maximal thermal stability of the polymer, whereas Marvel's research focused on condensation polymers with aromatic and heteroaromatic repeating units. This progressively led to the discovery of polybenzimidazole.

=== Development ===
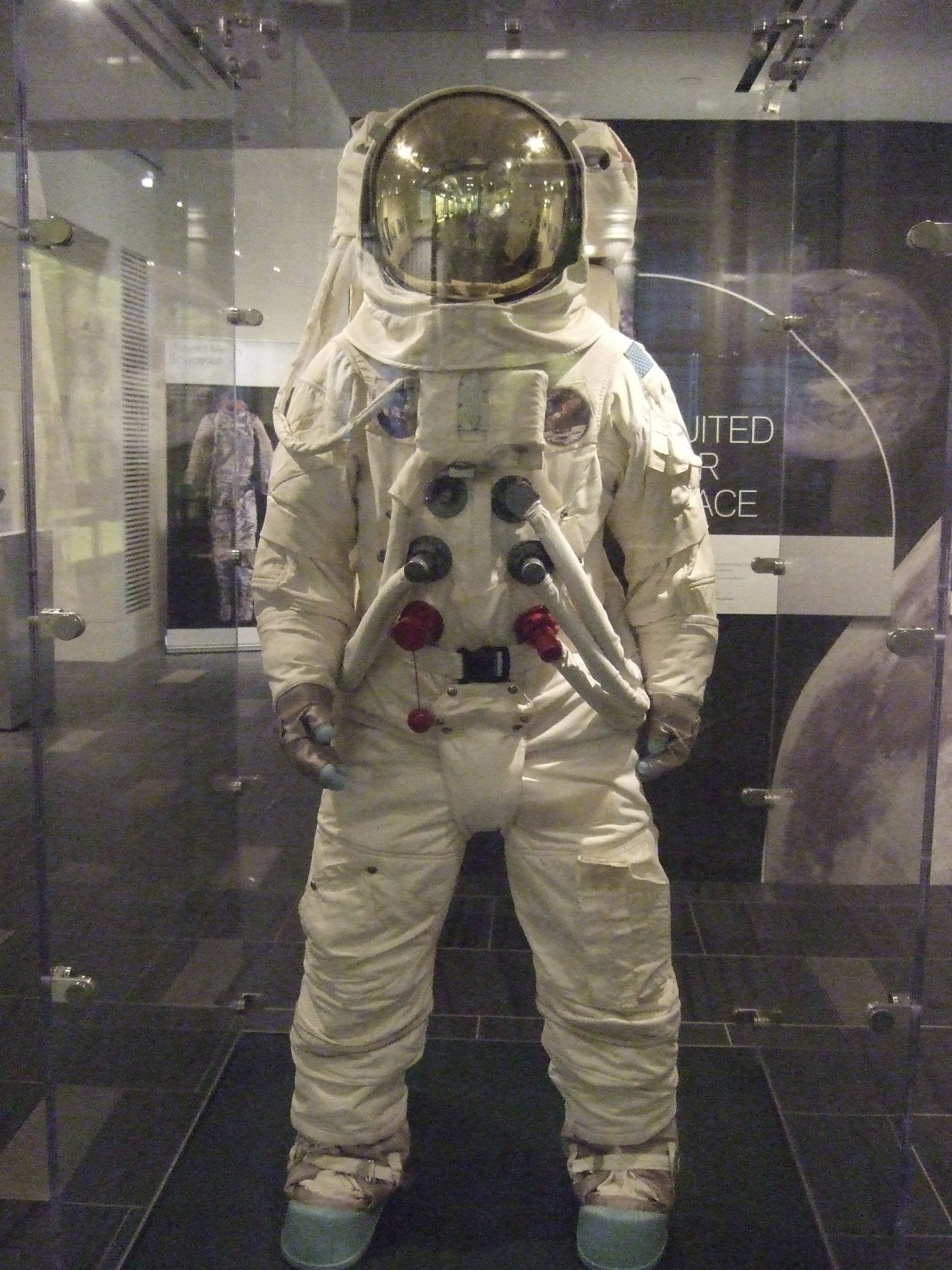
Replica Apollo spacesuit, Chemical Heritage Foundation temporary exhibit, 2014

Its development history can be summarized in the following list:

- In 1961, polybenzimidazole was developed by H. Vogel and C.S. Marvel with anticipation that the polymers would have exceptional thermal and oxidative stability.
- Subsequently, in 1963, NASA and the Air Force Materials Lab sponsored considerable work with polybenzimidazole for aerospace and defense applications as a non-flammable and thermally stable textile fiber.
- In 1969, the United States Air Force selected polybenzimidazole (PBI) for its superior thermal protective performance after a 1967 fire aboard the Apollo 1 spacecraft killed three astronauts.
- In the early 1970s USAF laboratories experimented with polybenzimidazole fibers for protective clothing to reduce aircrew deaths from fires.
- In the 1970s, NASA continued to use PBI as part of the astronauts’ clothing on Apollo, Skylab and numerous space shuttle flights.
- When Skylab fell to Earth, the part that survived the re-entry was coated in PBI and thus did not burn up.
- 1980s – PBI was introduced to the fire service, and through Project Fires an outer shell for turnout gear was developed. PBI Gold fabric was born, consisting of 40% PBI/60% para-aramid. Previous to this, combinations of Nomex, leather, and Kevlar materials were used in the US.
- 1983 – A unique production plant goes on-line and PBI fibers become commercially available.
- 1990s – Short-cut PBI fibers are introduced for use in automotive braking systems. PBI staple fiber enters the aircraft market for seat fire blocking layers.
- 1992 – Lightweight PBI fabrics are developed for flame-resistant workwear for electric utility and petrochemical applications.
- 1994 – PBI Gold fabric is engineered in black and was specified by the FDNY.
- 2001 – After the terrorist attacks on September 11, many of the 343 fire fighters killed were only identifiable by their TenCate PBI Turnout Gear.
- 2003 – PBI Matrix was commercialized and introduced as the next-generation PBI for firefighter turnout gear.

== Properties ==
=== General physical properties ===
PBI are usually yellow to brown solid infusible up to 400 °C (752 °F) or higher. The solubility of PBI is controversial, because while most of the linear PBI are partly or entirely dissolved in strong protonic acids (for instance, sulfuric acid or methanesulfonic acid), contradictory observations of solubilities have been recorded among weaker acids like formic acid, and in non-acidic media, such as the aprotic amide-type solvents and dimethyl sulfoxide. For example, one type of PBI prepared in phosphoric acid was found by Iwakura et al. to be partially soluble in formic acid, but completely soluble in dimethyl sulfoxide and dimethylacetamide, whereas Varma and Veena reported the same polymer type to dissolve completely in formic acid, yet only partially in dimethyl sulfoxide or dimethylacetamide.

=== Thermal stability ===
Imidazole derivatives are known to be stable compounds. Many of them are resistant to the most drastic treatments with acids and bases and not easily oxidized. The high decomposition temperature and high stability at over 400 °C suggests a polymer with benzimidazole as the repeating unit may also show high heat stability. Polybenzimidazole and its aromatic derivatives can withstand temperatures in excess of about 500 °C (932 °F) without softening and degrading. The polymer synthesized from isophthalic acid and 3,3'-Diaminobenzidine is not melted by exposure to a temperature of 770 °C (1,420 °F) and loses only 30% of its weight after exposure to high temperature up to 900 °C (1,650 °F) for several hours.

=== Flame resistance ===
A property of a material needed to be considered before putting it into application is flammability, which demonstrates how easily one material can ignite and combust under the realistic operating conditions. This may affect its application in varied areas, such as in construction, plant design, and interior decoration. A number of quantitative assessments of flammability exist, such as limiting oxygen index (LOI), i.e., the minimum oxygen concentration at which a given sample can be induced to burn in a candle like configuration. These permit estimation of a 'ranking' comparison of flammability. Data shows that PBI is a highly flame resistant material compared to common polymers.

=== Moisture regain ===
PBI's moisture regain is useful in protective clothing; this makes the clothing comfortable to wear, in sharp contrast to other synthetic polymers. The moisture regain ability of PBI (13%) compares favorably with cotton (16%).

== Synthesis ==
The preparation of PBI(IV) can be achieved by condensation reaction of diphenyl isophthalate (I) and 3,3’,4,4’-tetraaminodiphenyl (II) (Figure 1). The spontaneous cyclization of the intermediately formed amino-amide (III) to PBI (IV) provided a much more stable amide linkage. This synthetic method was first used in the lab and later developed into a two step process. In a typical synthesis, starting materials were heated at 270 °C (518 °F) for 1.5 h to form the PBI prepolymer and later the prepolymer was heated at 360 °C (680 °F) for another 1 h to form the final commercial-grade product.

The reason for the second step is due to the formation of the by-product phenol and water in the first step creating voluminous foam, which leads to the volume expansion of several times of the original. This is the issue that must be considered by the industrial manufacturers. This foam can be reduced by conducting the polycondensation at a high temperature around 200 °C (392 °F) and under the pressure of 2.1–4.2 MPa (300–610 psi). The foam can also be controlled by adding high boiling point liquids such as diphenylether or cetane to the polycondensation. The boiling point can make the liquid stay in the first stage of polycondensation but evaporate in the second stage of solid condensation. The disadvantage of this method is that there are still some liquids which remain in the PBI and it is hard to remove them completely.

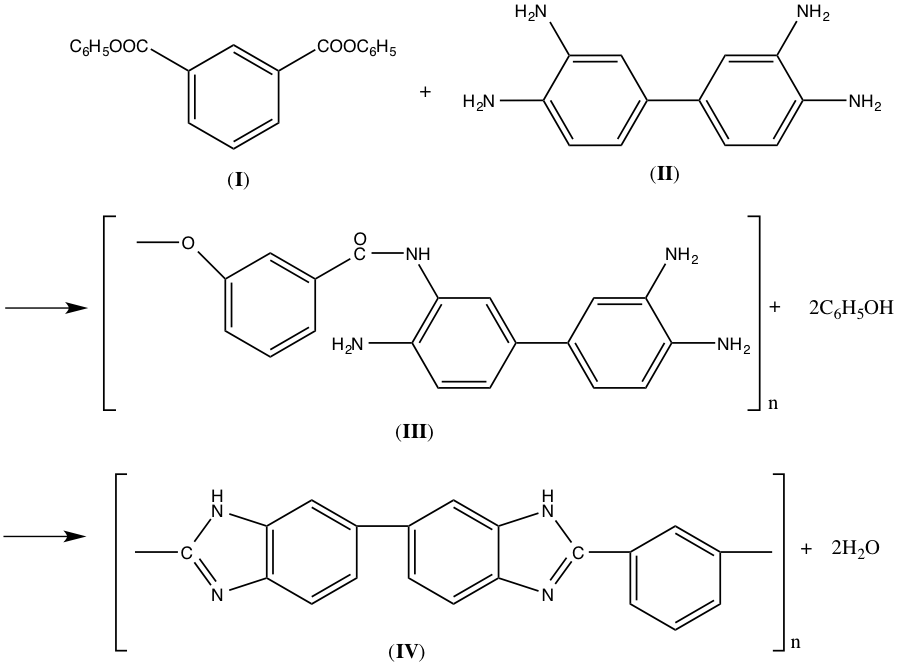
Figure1. The synthetic scheme for polybenzimidazole.

While changing the tetramine and acid, a number of different aromatic poly benzimidazoles have been synthesized. The following table (Table 1) lists some of the combination possibilities that have been synthesized in the literature. Some of the combinations have actually been translated into fibers on a small scale. However, the only significant progress that has been made to date is with PBI.

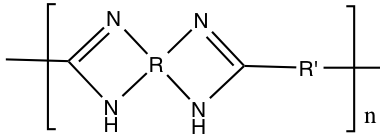
Formula for polybenzimidazole derivatives wherein R is an aromatic nucleus symmetrically tetra-substituted, with the nitrogen atoms of the formula being part of benzimidazole rings, and R' being a member of an aromatic hydrocarbon ring.

Table 1. Other monomers which form derivatives of polybenzimidazole
R(Tetramine)	R'(acid))
Benzene	Benzene
Diphenyl	Diphenyl
Diphenylether	Diphenylether
Diphenylsulfone	Naphthalene
Naphthalene	Pyridine
Pyridine	Anthraquinone
Anthraquinone	Ferrocene
	Anthracene

The most common form of PBI used in industry is the fiber form. The fiber process following polymerization is shown in the figure. The polymer is made into solution using dimethylacetamide as solvent. The solution is filtered and converted into fiber using a high temperature dry-spinning process. The fiber is subsequently drawn at elevated temperature to get desired mechanical properties. It is then sulfonated and made into staple using conventional crimping and cutting techniques.

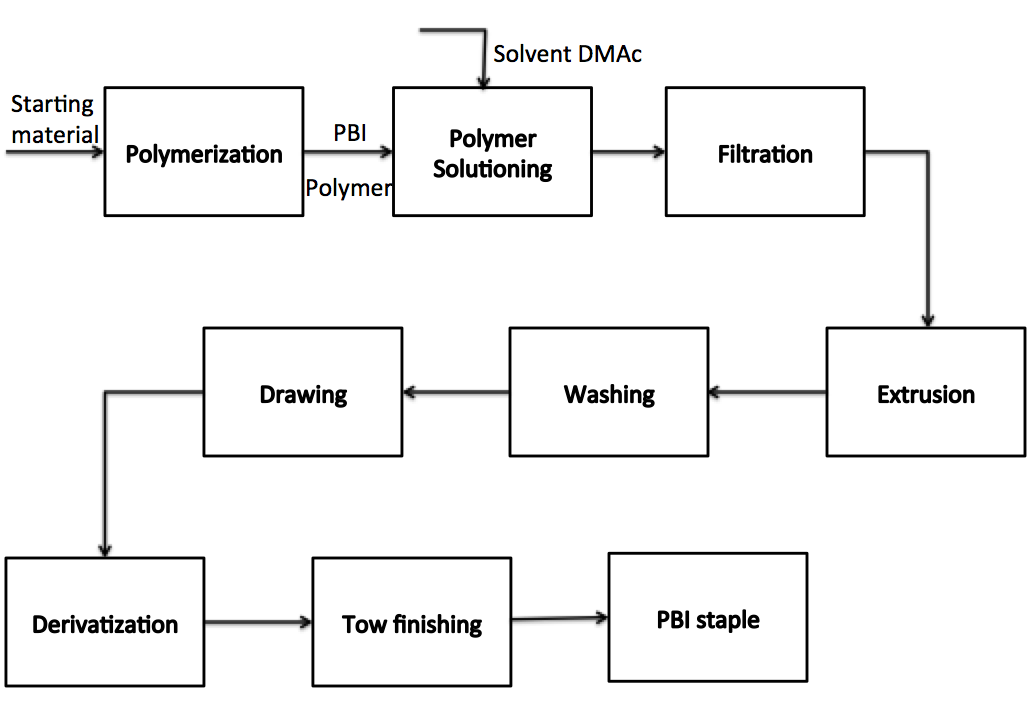
PBI fiber is process in a series of steps following polymerization to produce PBI staple form for direct usage.

== Applications ==
Before the 1980s, the major applications of PBI were fire-blocking, thermal protective apparel, and reverse osmosis membranes. Its applications became various by the 1990s when molded PBI parts and microporous membranes were developed.

=== Protective apparel ===
The thermal stability, flame resistance, and moisture regain of PBI and its conventional textile processing character enable it to be processed on conventional staple fiber textile equipment. These characteristics lead to one of the most important applications of PBI: protective apparel. PBI filaments were fabricated into protective clothing like firefighters' gear and astronauts' suits. PBI filaments are dry spun from dimethylacetamide containing lithium chloride. After washing and drying the resulting yarn is golden brown.

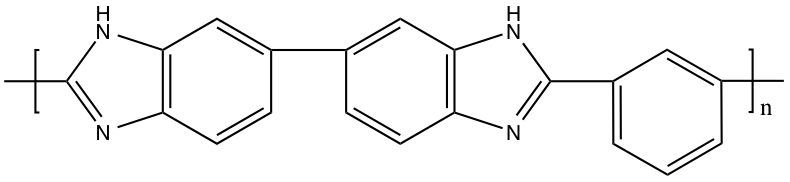
Now the fibers used in the protective gear is poly(2,2’-m-phenylene-5,5’-bibenzimidazole) which use tetraaminobipheny as monomer for a better thermo resistance property

PBI fiber is an excellent candidate for applications in severe environments due to its combination of thermal, chemical and textile properties. Flame and thermal resistance are the critical properties of protective apparel. This kind of apparel applications includes firefighter's protective apparel, astronaut's suits, aluminized crash rescue gear, industrial worker's apparel, and suits for racing car drivers.

Nowadays most of the fire fighters' protective gears are made with PBI fiber

PBI-blended fabrics have been the preferred choice of active fire departments across the Americas and around the world for over 30 years. From New York, San Diego, San Francisco, Philadelphia, Seattle, Nashville to São Paulo, Belin, Hong Kong and many more. The high decomposition temperature at which PBI starts to degrade is 1,300 °F (704 °C), exceeding Nomex/Kevlar blends (Nomex being at 700 °F (371 °C) and Kevlar at 1,100 °F (593 °C)), thus offering superior break-open and thermal protection.

=== PBI membranes ===
PBI has been used as the membranes for various separation purposes. Traditionally, PBI was used semi-permeable membranes for electrodialysis, reverse osmosis or ultrafiltration. PBI has also been used for gas separations. due to its close chain packing since PBI has rigidity structure and strong hydrogen bonding. PBI membranes are dense, with very low gas permeability. To be proton conductive, PBI usually is doped with acid. The higher level of the acid doping, the more conductive PBI is. But one problem raised is the mechanical strength of PBI decreases at the same time. The optimum doping level is thus a compromise between these two effects. Thus, multiple methods such as ionic cross-linking, covalent cross-linking and composite membranes have been researched to optimize the doping level at which PBI has an improved conductivity without sacrificing mechanical strength. Sulfonated partially fluorinated arylene main chain polymer exhibit good thermal and extended stability, high proton conductivities, less acid swelling, reasonable mechanical strength.

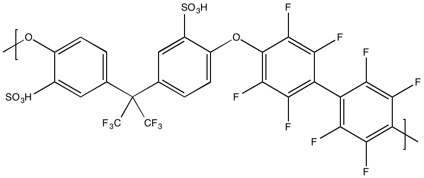
Fluorinated sulfonated polymers used for preparation of acid–base blend membranes with PBI. The blend membranes with PBI have excellent thermal and extended stability

=== Molded PBI resin ===
Molded PBI resin has compressive strength 58 ksi (400 MPa) and a tensile strength of 23 ksi (160 MPa), a flexural strength of 32 ksi (220 MPa), a ductile compressive failure mode and the density of 1.3 g/cm3. The PBI resin comprises a recurring structural unit represented by the following figure.

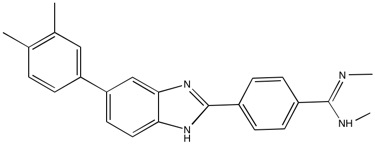
The recurring structural unit for PBI resin

According to the Composite Materials Research Group at the University of Wyoming, PBI resin parts maintain significant tensile properties and compressive strength to 700 °F (371 °C). PBI resin parts are also potential materials for the chemical process and oil recovery industries which have demands of thermal stability and chemical resistance. In these areas, PBI resin has been successfully applied in demanding sealing, for instance, valve seats, stem seals, hydraulic seals and backup rings. In the aerospace industry, PBI resin has high strength and short term high temperature resistance advantages. In the industrial sector, PBI resin's high dimensional stability as well as retention of electrical properties at high temperature make it used as a thermal and electrical insulator.

=== Fuel cell electrolyte ===
Polybenzimidazole is able to be complexed by strong acids because of its basic character. Complexation by phosphoric acid makes it a proton conductive material. This renders the possible application to high temperature fuel cells. Cell performance test show a good stability in performance for 200 h runs at 150 °C (302 °F). However, gel PBI membranes made in the PPA Process show good stability for greater than 17,000 hours at 160 °C (320 °F). Application in direct methanol fuel cells may be also of interest because of a better selectivity water/methanol compared to existing membranes. Wainright, Wang et al. reported that PBI doped with phosphoric acid was utilized as a high temperature fuel cell electrolyte. The doped PBI high temperature fuel cell electrolyte has several advantages. The elevated temperature increases the kinetic rates of the fuel cell reactions. It also can reduce the problem of the catalyst poisoning by adsorbed carbon monoxide and it minimizes problems due to electrode flooding. PBI/H_{3}PO_{4} is conductive even in low relative humidity and it allows less crossover of the methanol at the same time. These contribute PBI/H_{3}PO_{4} to be superior to some traditional polymer electrolytes such as Nafion. Additionally, PBI/H_{3}PO_{4} maintains good mechanical strength and toughness. Its modulus is three order of magnitudes greater than that of Nafion. This means that the thinner films can be used, thus reducing ohmic loss.

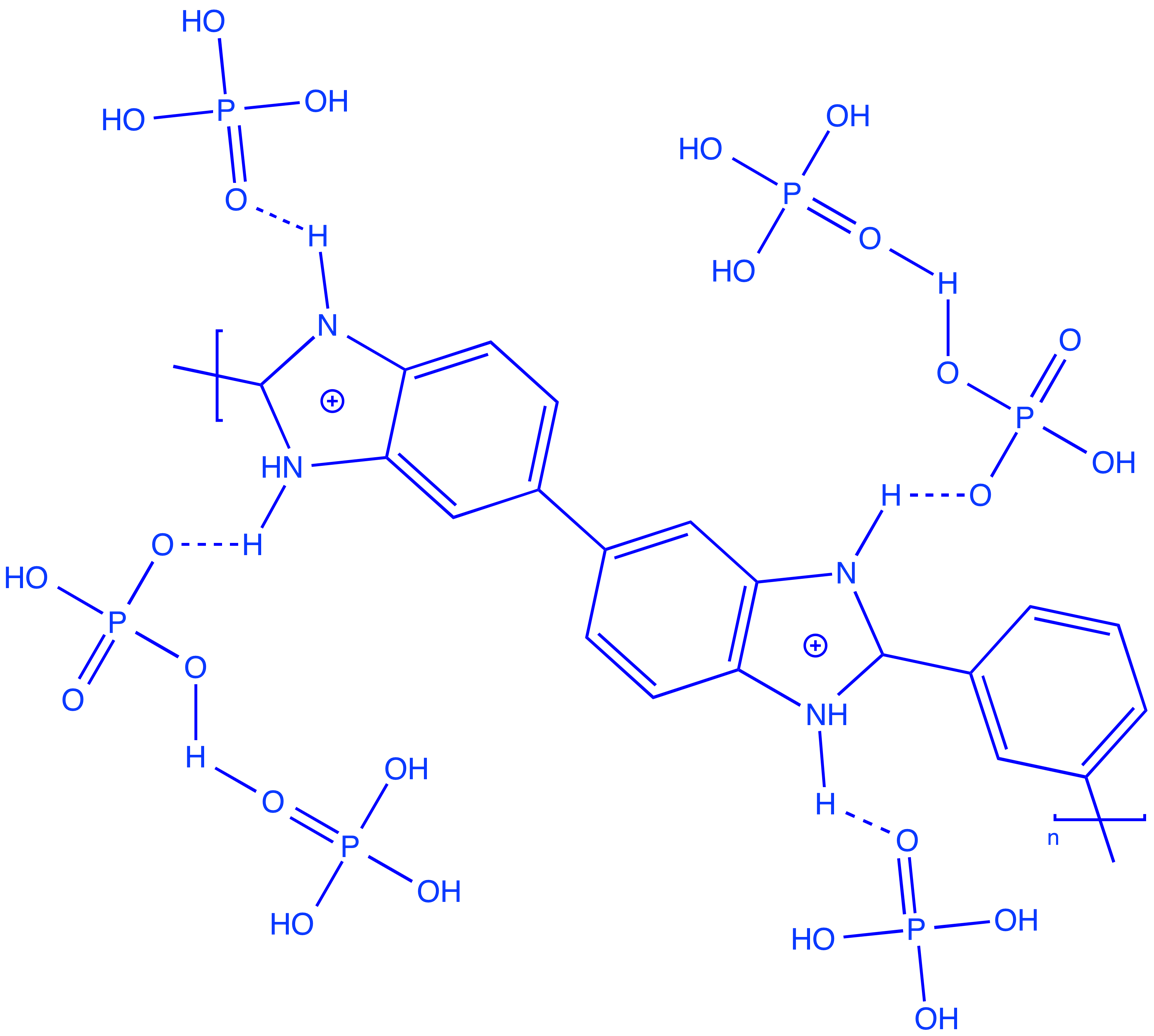
In phosphoric acid doped PBI, the phosphoric acid groups are not directly bonded to the polymer backbone. Instead, the low charge density anion is immobilized and linked to the structure by a strong hydrogen-bond network.

=== Asbestos replacement ===
Previously, only asbestos could perform well in high-temperature gloves for uses such as foundries, aluminium extrusion, and metal treatment. However, trials have been performed which show that PBI adequately functions as an asbestos replacement. Moreover, a safety garment manufacturer reported that gloves containing PBI outlasted asbestos by two to nine times with an effective cost. Gloves containing PBI fibers are softer and more supple than those made of asbestos, offering the worker greater mobility and comfort, even if the fabric becomes charred. Further, PBI fiber avoids the chronic toxicity problems associated with asbestos because it is processed on standard textile and glove fabricating equipment. PBI can also be a good substitute for asbestos in several areas of glass manufacturing.

=== Flue gas filtration ===
PBI's chemical, thermal and physical properties demonstrate that it can be a promising material as a flue gas filter fabric for coal-fired boilers. Few fabrics can survive in the acidic and high-temperature environment encountered in coal-fired boiler flue gas. The filter bags also must be able to bear the abrasion from the periodic cleaning to remove accumulated dust. PBI fabric has a good abrasion resistance property. The acid and abrasion resistance and thermal stability properties make PBI a competitor for this application.

== Appendix of properties ==
=== PBI fiber characteristics ===
The chemical formula of poly[2,2’-(m-phenylen)-5,5’ bibenzimidazol] (PBI) is believed to be: ([NH-C=CH-C=CH-CH=C-N=C-]_{2}-[C=CH-C=CH-CH=CH-])_{n} OR (C_{20}N_{4}H_{12})_{n} of Molar mass 308.336 ± 0.018 g/mol.

=== Chemical resistance ===
Chemical Resistance	Grade
Acids - concentrated	Poor
Acids - dilute	Fair-Poor
Alcohols	Good
Alkalis	Good-Poor
Aromatic hydrocarbons	Good
Greases and Oils	Good
Halogenated Hydrocarbons	Good
Ketones	Good

It is dyeable to dark shades with basic dyes following caustic pretreatment and resistant to most chemicals.

=== Electrical properties ===
Electrical	Properties
Dielectric constant @ 1 MHz	3.2
Dielectric strength	21 kV/mm
Volume resistivity	8 × 10^{14} Ω·cm

Features low electrical conductivity and low static electricity buildup.

=== Mechanical properties ===
Mechanical	Properties
Coefficient of friction	0.19-0.27
Compressive modulus	6.2 GPa
Compressive strength	400 MPa
Elongation at break	3%
Hardness - Rockwell	K115
Izod impact strength	590 J/m unnotched
Poisson's ratio	0.34
Tensile modulus	5.9 GPa
Tensile strength	160 MPa

Features abrasion resistance.

=== Physical properties ===
Physical	Properties
Char Yield (under pyrolysis)	High
Density	1.3 g/cm^{3}
Flammability	Does not burn
Limiting oxygen index	58%
Radiation resistance	Good
Water absorption - over 24 hours	0.4%

Additional features: will not ignite or smolder (burn slowly without flame), mildew- and age-resistant, resistant to sparks and welding spatter.

=== Thermal properties ===
Thermal	Properties	Grade
Coefficient of thermal expansion	23 × 10^{−6}/K	Low
Heat-deflection temperature - 0.45 MPa	435 °C (815 °F)	High
Thermal conductivity @ 23 °C (73 °F)	0.41 W·m^{−1}·K^{−1}	Low
Upper working temperature	260–400 °C (500–752 °F)	High

Other features: continuous temperature: 540 °C (1,004 °F), does not melt but degrades around the temperature: 760 °C (1,400 °F) under pyrolysis, retains fiber integrity and suppleness up to 540 °C (1,004 °F).
