= 2,4-Xylidine =

Names
- Preferred IUPAC name 2,4-Dimethylaniline
- Other names 2,4-Dimethylphenylamine; 2,4-Dimethylbenzenamine

Identifiers
CAS Number	95-68-1
3D model (JSmol)	Interactive image
Beilstein Reference	636243
ChEBI	CHEBI:27840
ChEMBL	ChEMBL1490826
ChemSpider	6980
ECHA InfoCard	100.002.219
EC Number	202-440-0
KEGG	C11003
PubChem CID	7250
RTECS number	ZE8925000
UNII	367R1L22C9
UN number	1711
CompTox Dashboard (EPA)	DTXSID8026305
- InChI: InChI=1S/C8H11N/c1-6-3-4-8(9)7(2)5-6/h3-5H,9H2,1-2H3 Key: CZZZABOKJQXEBO-UHFFFAOYSA-N
- SMILES: Cc1ccc(N)c(C)c1

Properties
Chemical formula	C_{8}H_{11}N
Appearance	colourless liquid
Density	0.9763
Melting point	−15.9 °C (3.4 °F; 257.2 K)
Boiling point	218.0 °C (424.4 °F; 491.1 K)
Solubility in water	low

Hazards
- GHS labelling
Pictograms	(GHS06: Toxic) (GHS07: Exclamation mark) (GHS08: Health hazard) (GHS09: Environmental hazard)
Signal word	Warning
Hazard statements	H301, H311, H319, H330, H331, H373, H411
Precautionary statements	P260, P264, P270, P271, P273, P280, P284, P301+P310, P302+P352, P304+P340, P305+P351+P338, P310, P311, P312, P314, P320, P321, P330, P337+P313, P361, P363, P391, P403+P233, P405, P501
Flash point	100
- Except where otherwise noted, data are given for materials in their standard state (at 25 °C [77 °F], 100 kPa). verify (what is ?) Infobox references

2,4-Xylidine is an organic compound with the formula C_{6}H_{3}(CH_{3})_{2}NH_{2}. It is one of several isomeric xylidines. It is a colorless viscous liquid. Commercially significant derivatives include the veterinary drug cymiazole and the colorant Pigment Yellow 81.

Genotoxic and teratogenic, 2,4‑xylidine is an industrial pollutant. In addition, it is a degradant of the pesticide amitraz at very acidic pH values (<3).

It is prepared by nitration of m-xylene followed by hydrogenation.
