= Diarylide pigment =

Class of organic compounds that are used as pigments

Diarylide pigments are organic compounds that are used as pigments in inks and related materials. They often are yellow or yellow-green. To some extent, these organic compounds have displaced cadmium sulfide from the market. Being pigments, these compounds exist as (yellow) powders of low solubility in water. They are similar to the simpler monoazo pigments called arylide yellows.

== Production and properties ==
Synthesis of C.I. Pigment Yellow 13, a diarylide pigment.

Pigment Yellow encompasses a commercially important family of diarylide pigments.

Pigment	CAS Registry Number	Benzidine component	acetoacetanilide component
Pigment Yellow 12	6358-85-6	3,3'-dichlorobenzidine	phenyl
Pigment Yellow 13	5102-83-0	3,3'-dichlorobenzidine	meta-xylyl
Pigment Yellow 14	5468-75-7	3,3'-dichlorobenzidine	ortho-tolyl
Pigment Yellow 17	4531-49-1	3,3'-dichlorobenzidine	ortho-anisyl
Pigment Yellow 55	6358-37-8	3,3'-dichlorobenzidine	para-tolyl
Pigment Yellow 63	14569-54-1	3,3'-dichlorobenzidine	ortho-chlorophenyl
Pigment Yellow 81	22094-93-5	2,2',5,5'-tetrachlorobenzidine	meta-xylyl
Pigment Yellow 83	5567-15-7	3,3'-dichlorobenzidine	4-chlorophenyl

=== Preparation ===
The formation of diarylide pigments involves the reaction of doubly diazotized aromatic diamines (derivatives of benzidine) with acetoacetanilides. By varying both of these components the benzidine and the acetoacetanilide - several useful pigments have been produced. A related family of organic pigments are the simpler arylides, which arise from the coupling of mono-diazonium salts with the same coupling partners.

The pigments' colors can range from yellow to yellow-green. One common diarylide yellow pigment is Pigment yellow 12. From the selection of diarylide yellow pigments shown below one can appreciate the subtle changes in the substituents. Worldwide production of organic pigments was estimated to be about 250,000 metric tons (t) in 2006, with about 25%, or 62,500 t, being diarylide yellows.

=== Structure ===
Being pigments, these compounds have very low solubility, especially in water. Single crystals for X-ray crystallography can however be grown from hot solutions in organic solvents. For example, crystals of Pigment Yellow 13, 14, and 63 were grown by slow cooling 200 °C solutions of the pigments in 1,2,4-trichlorobenzene. These vigorous conditions also indicate the considerable thermal stability enjoyed by these compounds. X-ray crystallography, spectroscopy, and electronic structure calculations consistently show that these compounds exist as the (bis) keto-hydrazone tautomers, even though these structures are often depicted as diazo compounds. They are planar molecules.

Selected diarylide pigments

Pigment yellow 83

Pigment Yellow 81

Pigment Yellow 17

Pigment Yellow 14

Pigment Yellow 16

Pigment Yellow 63

== Uses ==
The diarylide yellows are the most common yellow pigments used in printing as well as a wide variety of other applications. Due to their stability, diarylide yellows are used in inks, coatings, and as plastic colorants. The pigment is insoluble. It is a standard pigment used in printing ink and packaging industry. The diarylide yellow pigment Yellow 12 is one of the three main colored pigments used in the four color process of color printing. As such, its use is ubiquitous in printing both in commercial applications and in home color printers, as well as in textile printing.

== Toxicity and hazards ==
Diarylide yellow pigments are considered to be non-toxic. There is, however, evidence that these pigments degrade when exposed to temperatures above 200 °C to release 3,3'-dichlorobenzidine, a carcinogen that is listed in the U.S. EPA's Toxics Release Inventory. 3,3’-Dichlorobenzidine is structurally similar to one of the polychlorinated biphenyl congeners, PCB 11 (3,3’-dichlorobiphenyl), and some evidence indicates that the use of diarylide yellow pigments introduces PCB 11 to the environment.

== See also ==
- List of colours
