= Tolidine =

2-Tolidine

Names
- Preferred IUPAC name 3,3′-Dimethyl-[1,1′-biphenyl]-4,4′-diamine
- Other names o-Tolidine; Orthotolidine; Diaminoditolyl; Diaminotolyl; Bianisidine; Tolidine blue; 3,3'-Dimethylbenzidine; 4,4'-Bi-o-toluidine

Identifiers
CAS Number	119-93-7
3D model (JSmol)	Interactive image
ChEBI	CHEBI:34320
ChEMBL	ChEMBL85109
ChemSpider	8106
ECHA InfoCard	100.003.962
EC Number	204-358-0
KEGG	C14443
PubChem CID	8413
UNII	63HLO2IV6K
CompTox Dashboard (EPA)	DTXSID5024059
- InChI: InChI=1S/C14H16N2/c1-9-7-11(3-5-13(9)15)12-4-6-14(16)10(2)8-12/h3-8H,15-16H2,1-2H3 Key: NUIURNJTPRWVAP-UHFFFAOYSA-N; InChI=1/C14H16N2/c1-9-7-11(3-5-13(9)15)12-4-6-14(16)10(2)8-12/h3-8H,15-16H2,1-2H3 Key: NUIURNJTPRWVAP-UHFFFAOYAK
- SMILES: CC1=C(C=CC(=C1)C2=CC(=C(C=C2)N)C)N

Properties
Chemical formula	C_{14}H_{16}N_{2}
Molar mass	212.296 g·mol^{−1}
Appearance	White to reddish crystals or powder
Density	1.23 g/cm^{3}
Melting point	129 °C (264 °F; 402 K)
Boiling point	300.5 °C (572.9 °F; 573.6 K)
Solubility in water	1.3 g/L

Hazards
- Occupational safety and health (OHS/OSH)
Main hazards	potential carcinogen
- GHS labelling
Pictograms	(GHS07: Exclamation mark) (GHS08: Health hazard) (GHS09: Environmental hazard)
Signal word	Danger
Hazard statements	H302, H350, H411
Precautionary statements	P201, P202, P264, P270, P273, P281, P301+P312, P308+P313, P330, P391, P405, P501
Flash point	244 °C (471 °F; 517 K)
- NIOSH (US health exposure limits)
PEL (Permissible)	Handle with care
REL (Recommended)	Ca C 0.02 mg/m^{3} [60-minute] [skin]
IDLH (Immediate danger)	Ca [N.D.]
- Except where otherwise noted, data are given for materials in their standard state (at 25 °C [77 °F], 100 kPa). verify (what is ?) Infobox references

2-Tolidine (orthotolidine, o-tolidine; not to be confused with o-toluidine) is an organic compound with the chemical formula (C_{6}H_{4}(CH_{3})NH_{2})_{2}. Several isomers are known; the 3-tolidine derivative is also important commercially. It is a colorless compound although commercial samples are often colored. It is slightly soluble in water. It forms salts with acids, such as the hydrochloride, which is commercially available.

2-Tolidine can be produced by benzidine rearrangement from a hydrazone derivative of 2-nitrotoluene.

(CH_{3}C_{6}H_{4})_{2}N_{2}H_{2} → (C_{6}H_{3}(CH_{3})NH_{2})_{2}

== Uses ==
2-Tolidine is an aromatic amine used mainly for dye production. 2-Tolidine is an intermediate for the production of soluble azo dyes and insoluble pigments used particularly in the textile, leather and paper industries. For this purpose, it is converted to the bis(diazonium) salt.

Pigment Yellow 16, a derivative of o-tolidine

It is also used for the production of certain elastomers.

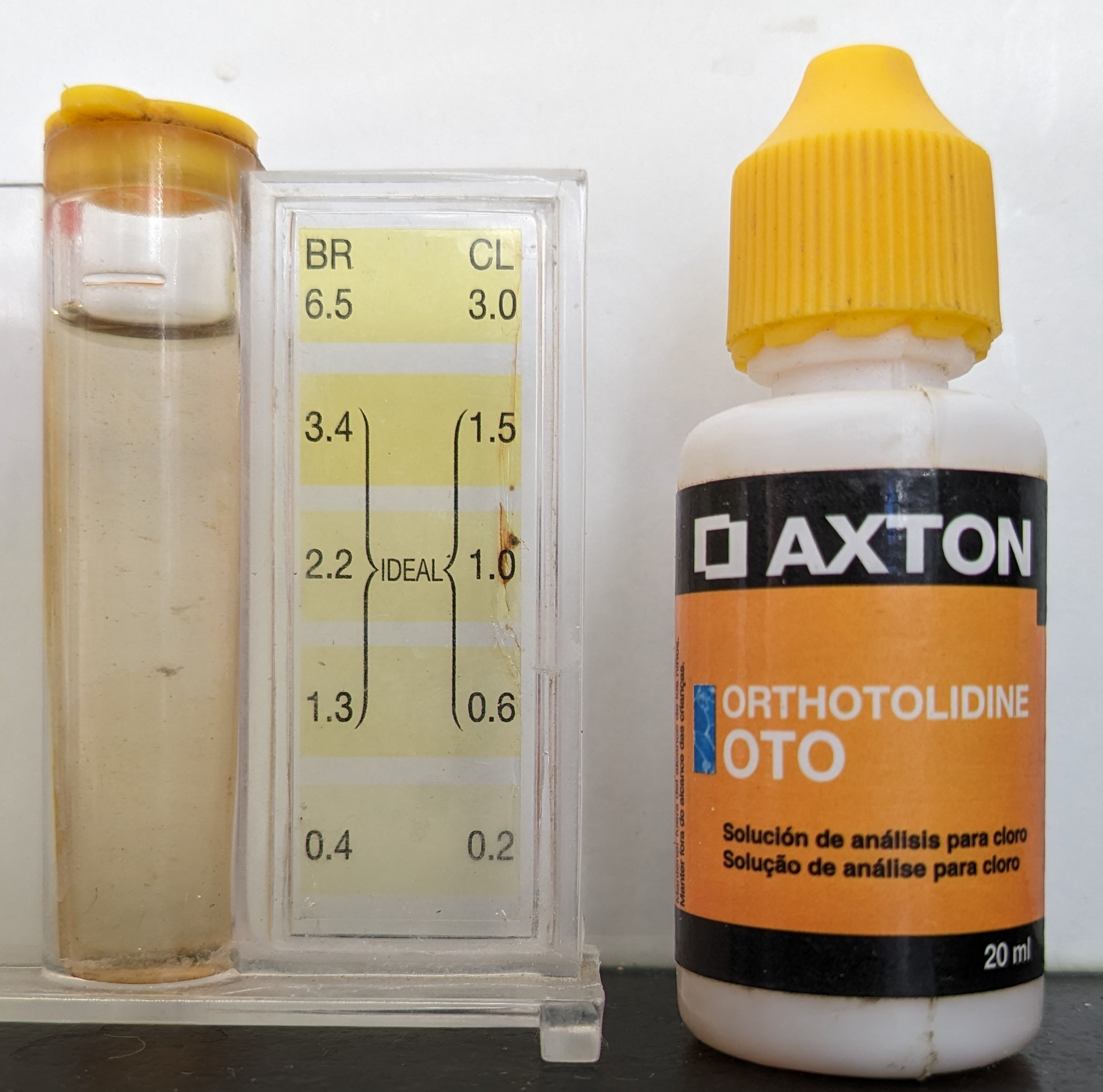
Orthotolidine in chlorine test kit

2-Tolidine was widely used as a reagent or indicator in analytical, clinical and forensic chemistry, such as in the analytical determination of gold, or determination of the chlorine level in swimming pool water.

== Safety ==
2-Tolidine is toxic and possibly carcinogenic. It is listed as an IARC Group 2B carcinogen, meaning it is "possibly carcinogenic to humans". Animal studies have shown that animals exposed to tolidine developed tumors in the liver, kidney, and mammary glands.
