= Arylide yellow =

Family of organic compounds used as industrial colorants

Color coordinates
- Hex triplet: #E9D66B
- sRGB^{B} (r, g, b): (233, 214, 107)
- HSV (h, s, v): (51°, 54%, 91%)
- CIELCh_{uv} (L, C, h): (85, 71, 76°)
- ISCC–NBS descriptor: Brilliant greenish yellow
- B: Normalized to [0–255] (byte)

Arylide yellow, also known as Hansa yellow and monoazo yellow, is a family of organic compounds used as pigments. They are primarily used as industrial colorants including plastics, building paints and inks. They are also used in artistic oil paints, acrylics and watercolors. These pigments are usually semi-transparent and range from orange-yellow to yellow-greens. Related organic pigments are the diarylide pigments. Overall, these pigments have partially displaced the toxic cadmium yellow in the marketplace. Painters such as Alexander Calder and Jackson Pollock are known to have employed arylide yellow in their artworks.

== Production ==
The compound is obtained by azo coupling of aniline and acetoacetanilide or their derivatives. The class of compounds was discovered in Germany in 1909. The initially formed diazo compound tautomerizes to give a ketohydrazone, which features extended pi-conjugation.

formation of Hansa pigments by diazotization followed by tautomerization

== Examples ==
Members of this class include:

- Pigment Yellow 6 (CAS# 2512-29-0), derived from 2-nitrotoluene (diazonium precursor) and aniline (acetoacetanilide precursor) to produce medium yellows.
- Pigment Yellow 3, derived from 4-chloro-2-nitroaniline (diazonium precursor) and 2-chloroaniline (acetoacetanilide precursor) to produce greenish-yellows.
- Pigment Yellow 61 a lake pigment
- Pigment Yellow 74, derived from 2-methoxy-4-nitroaniline (diazonium precursor) and 2-methoxyaniline (acetoacetanilide precursor) to produce greenish-yellows.
- Pigment Yellow 97, which contains the phenylaminosulfonyl substituent, which confers particularly high fastness.

== Artists Pigments ==
Several monoazo yellows are used as artists' pigments, frequently marketed under the names 'Hansa' or Arylide. These include:

- PY1
- PY2
- PY3 Hansa Yellow Light or Lemon Yellow
- PY4
- PY5
- PY6
- PY10
- PY60
- PY65 Hansa Yellow Deep or Indian Yellow
- PY74 Hansa Yellow Medium or Primary Yellow
- PY82
- PY97 Hansa Yellow Medium or Hansa Yellow Deep

== See also ==
- List of colors
