= Hydrazobenzene =

Names
- Preferred IUPAC name 1,2-Diphenylhydrazine
- Other names: N,N′-Diphenylhydrazine; N,N′-Bianiline

Identifiers
CAS Number	122-66-7
3D model (JSmol)	Interactive image
ChEMBL	ChEMBL558459
ChemSpider	28962
ECHA InfoCard	100.004.149
EC Number	204-563-5
PubChem CID	31222
UNII	1G3CS09TUK
UN number	2811
CompTox Dashboard (EPA)	DTXSID7020710
- InChI: InChI=1S/C12H12N2/c1-3-7-11(8-4-1)13-14-12-9-5-2-6-10-12/h1-10,13-14H Key: YBQZXXMEJHZYMB-UHFFFAOYSA-N
- SMILES: c1ccc(cc1)NNc2ccccc2

Properties
Chemical formula	C_{12}H_{12}N_{2}
Molar mass	184.242 g·mol^{−1}
Melting point	123–126 °C (253–259 °F; 396–399 K)

Hazards
- GHS labelling
Pictograms	(GHS07: Exclamation mark) (GHS08: Health hazard) (GHS09: Environmental hazard)
Signal word	Danger
Hazard statements	H302, H350, H410
Precautionary statements	P203, P264, P270, P273, P280, P301+P317, P318, P330, P391, P405, P501
- Except where otherwise noted, data are given for materials in their standard state (at 25 °C [77 °F], 100 kPa). Infobox references

Hydrazobenzene (1,2-diphenylhydrazine) is an aromatic organic compound consisting of two aniline groups joined via their nitrogen atoms. It is an important industrial chemical used in the manufacture of dyes, pharmaceuticals, and hydrogen peroxide.
