= Diketene =

Organic compound with formula (CH2CO)2

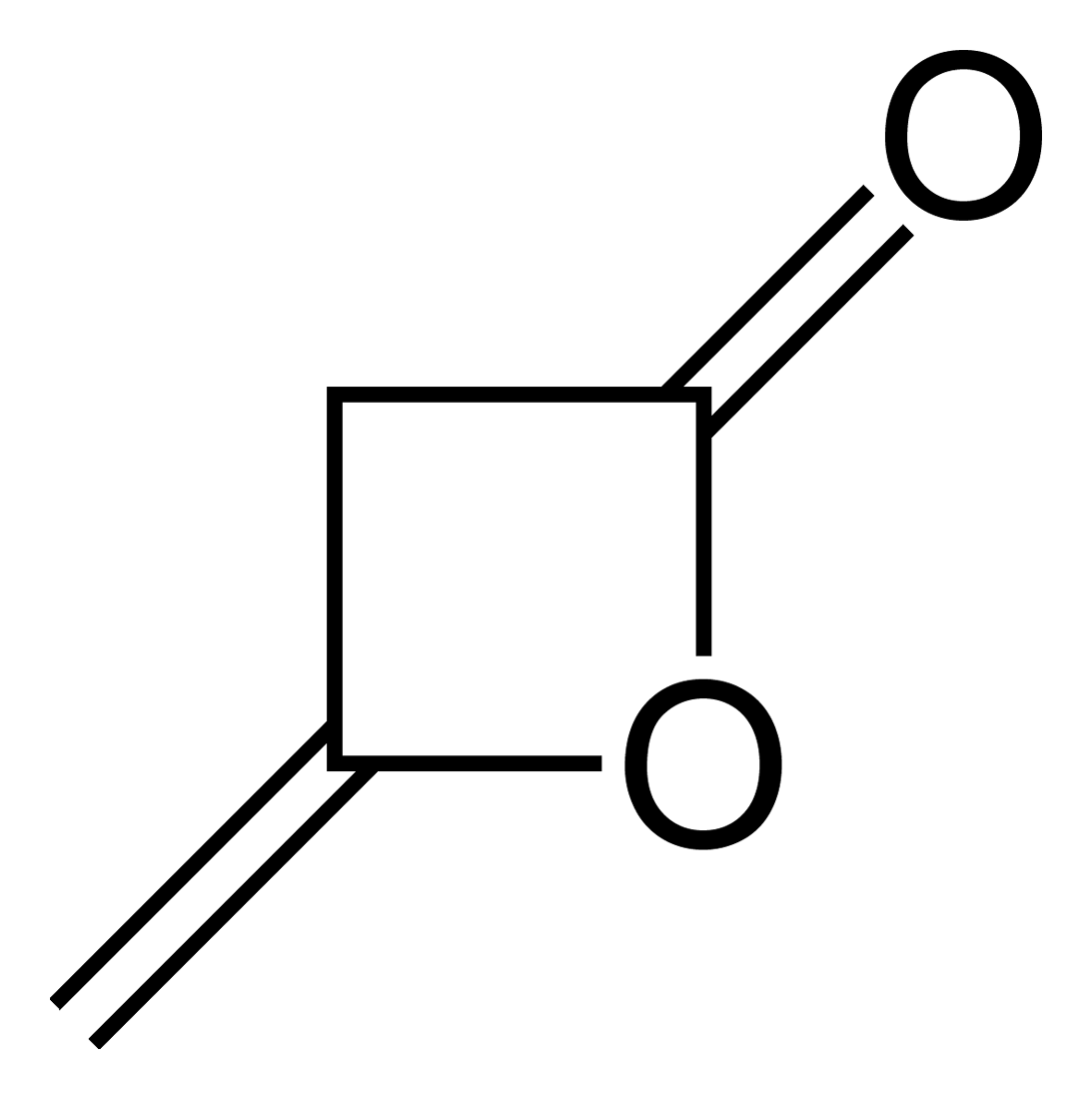

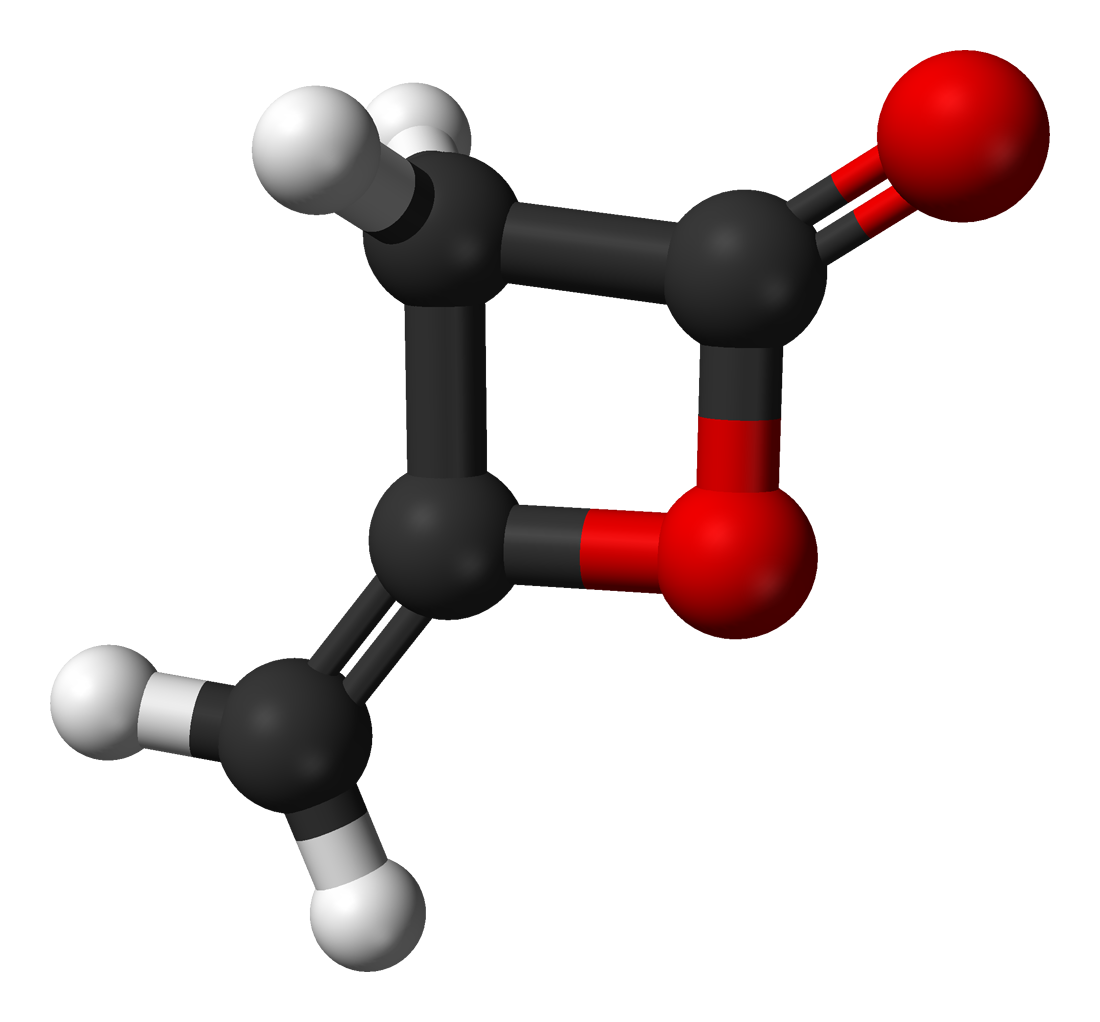

Names
- Preferred IUPAC name 4-Methylideneoxetan-2-one
- Other names γ-Methylenepropiolactone

Identifiers
CAS Number	674-82-8
3D model (JSmol)	Interactive image
ChemSpider	12140
ECHA InfoCard	100.010.562
EC Number	211-617-1
PubChem CID	12661
RTECS number	RQ8225000
UNII	0DZ97C3Z7D
UN number	2521
CompTox Dashboard (EPA)	DTXSID9027289
- InChI: InChI=1S/C4H4O2/c1-3-2-4(5)6-3/h1-2H2 Key: WASQWSOJHCZDFK-UHFFFAOYSA-N; InChI=1/C4H4O2/c1-3-2-4(5)6-3/h1-2H2 Key: WASQWSOJHCZDFK-UHFFFAOYAM
- SMILES: O=C1OC(=C)C1

Properties
Chemical formula	C_{4}H_{4}O_{2}
Molar mass	84.074 g·mol^{−1}
Density	1.09 g cm^{−3}
Melting point	−7 °C (19 °F; 266 K)
Boiling point	127 °C (261 °F; 400 K)
Viscosity	0.88 mPa.s

Hazards
- GHS labelling
Pictograms	(GHS02: Flammable) (GHS05: Corrosive) (GHS06: Toxic) (GHS07: Exclamation mark)
Signal word	Danger
Hazard statements	H226, H301, H302, H315, H318, H330, H331, H332, H335
Precautionary statements	P210, P233, P240, P241, P242, P243, P260, P264, P270, P271, P280, P284, P301+P310, P301+P312, P302+P352, P303+P361+P353, P304+P312, P304+P340, P305+P351+P338, P310, P311, P312, P320, P321, P330, P332+P313, P362, P370+P378, P403+P233, P403+P235, P405, P501
Flash point	33 °C (91 °F; 306 K)
Autoignition temperature	275
- Except where otherwise noted, data are given for materials in their standard state (at 25 °C [77 °F], 100 kPa). verify (what is ?) Infobox references

Diketene is an organic compound with the molecular formula C_{4}H_{4}O_{2}, and which is sometimes written as (CH_{2}CO)_{2}. It is formed by dimerization of ketene, H_{2}C=C=O. Diketene is a member of the oxetane family. It is used as a reagent in organic chemistry. It is a colorless liquid.

== Production ==
Diketene is produced on commercial scale by dimerization of ketene.

== Reactions ==
Heating or irradiation with UV light regenerates the ketene monomer:

(C_{2}H_{2}O)_{2} ⇌ 2 CH_{2}CO

Alkylated ketenes also dimerize with ease and form substituted diketenes.

Diketene readily hydrolyzes in water forming acetoacetic acid. Its half-life in water is approximately 45 min. a 25 °C at 2 < pH < 7.

Certain diketenes with two aliphatic chains, such as alkyl ketene dimers (AKDs), are used industrially to improve hydrophobicity in paper.

At one time acetic anhydride was prepared by the reaction of ketene with acetic acid:

H_{2}C=C=O + CH_{3}COOH → (CH_{3}CO)_{2}O Δ_{H} = −63 kJ/mol

=== Acetoacetylation ===
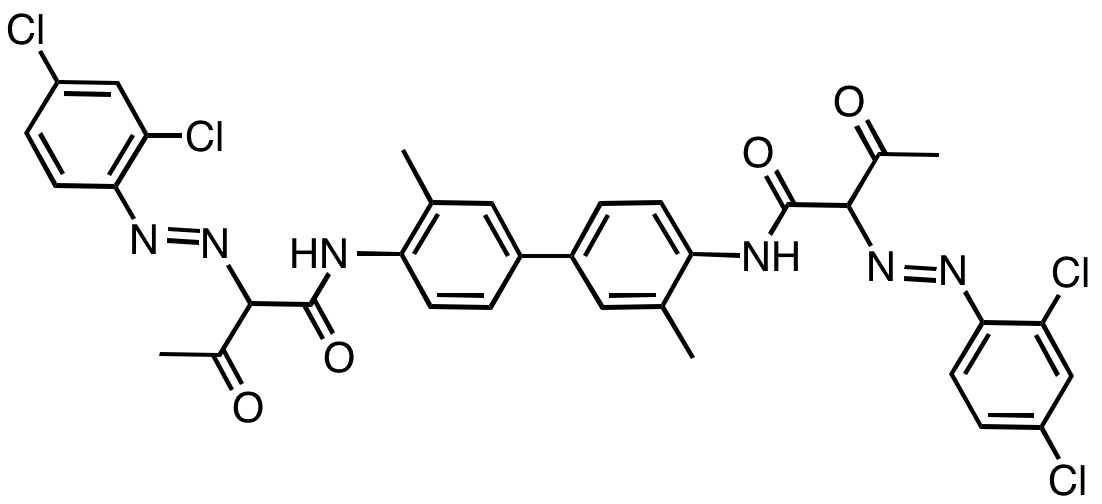
Pigment Yellow 16 is a typical dye containing the acetoacetyl group

Diketene also reacts with alcohols and amines to the corresponding acetoacetic acid derivatives. The process is sometimes called acetoacetylation. An example is the reaction with 2-aminoindane:

Diketene is an important industrial intermediate used for the production of acetoacetate esters and amides as well as substituted 1-phenyl-3-methylpyrazolones. The latter are used in the manufacture of dyestuffs and pigments. A typical reaction is:

ArNH_{2} + (CH_{2}CO)_{2} → ArNHC(O)CH_{2}C(O)CH_{3}

These acetoacetamides are precursors to arylide yellow and diarylide pigments.

== Use ==
Diketenes with two alkyl chains are used in the manufacture of paper for sizing of paper in order to improve their printability (by hydrophobization). Besides the rosin resins with about 60% share of world consumption, long chain diketenes called alkylketene dimers (AKD) are with 16% share the most important synthetic paper sizes, they are usually used in concentrations of 0.15%, meaning 1.5 kg solid AKD/t paper.

The preparation of AKD is carried out by chlorination of long chain fatty acids (such as stearic acid, using chlorinating agents such as thionyl chloride) to give the corresponding acid chlorides and subsequent elimination of HCl by amines (for example triethylamine) in toluene or other solvents:

Furthermore, diketenes are used as intermediates in the manufacture of pharmaceuticals, insecticides and dyes. For example pyrazolones are formed from substituted phenylhydrazines, they were used as analgetics but are now largely obsolete. With methylamine diketene reacts to give N,N'-dimethylacetoacetamide, a precursor to the (controversial) insecticide monocrotophos. Diketenes react with substituted aromatic amines to acetoacetanilides, which are important precursors for many yellow, orange, and red azo dyes and azo pigments.

Exemplary for the synthesis of arylides by the reaction of diketene with aromatic amines is:

The product undergoes aromatic diazonium coupling with arylides to form azo dyes, such as Pigment Yellow 74.

The industrial synthesis of the sweetener acesulfam-K is based on the reaction of diketene with sulfamic acid and cyclization by sulfur trioxide (SO_{3}).

Drugs made from Diketene include:

1. Lercanidipine
2. Manidipine
3. Olaquindox
4. Butoctamide
5. Ketazolam
6. Carboxin
7. Ipramidil

== Safety ==
Despite its high reactivity as an alkylating agent, and unlike analogue β-lactones propiolactone and β-butyrolactone, diketene is inactive as a carcinogen, possibly due to the instability of its DNA adducts.
