= Hyperactivity =

Syndrome of abnormally high activity

Hyperactivity is a psychological or physical state of abnormally high activity, a symptom of certain medical or psychiatric conditions, and a common psychological syndrome. As a behavioral descriptor, hyperactivity includes increased movement such as fidgeting or constant movement, talking too much, difficulty concentrating, and other manifestations.

The colloquial term hyper is an abbreviation of hyperactive.

== Causes ==
=== Medical and psychiatric conditions ===
Hyperactivity is associated with several medical and psychiatric or psychological conditions and can be a side effect of certain medications.

==== Attention deficit hyperactivity disorder ====
Hyperactivity is a hallmark of attention deficit hyperactivity disorder (ADHD). ADHD is a neurodevelopmental disorder characterised by symptoms of inattention, hyperactivity, impulsivity, and emotional dysregulation that are excessive and pervasive, impairing in multiple contexts, and developmentally inappropriate. ADHD symptoms arise from executive dysfunction.

=== Diet ===
Popular belief and reports in the medical and scientific literature have linked various dietary exposures to hyperactivity. Although concerns have been expressed about a linkage between food additives and hyperactivity, there is no clear evidence of a cause-and-effect relationship.

==== Sugar consumption ====
The majority of studies show no connection between sugar and hyperactivity. Some people, particularly parents and teachers, believe that sugar causes hyperactivity, and that children's behavior often gets more rowdy, excited and energetic after they eat too much sugary food and drink too many sugary drinks (such as chocolates/sweets or soft drinks). One particular study found that the perception by parents regarding their children's hyperactivity depended on their belief as to whether they had been given sugar, and thus, a placebo effect was observed. Regardless of this, the studies conducted present that there is no correlation between sugar and hyperactivity.

==== Food dyes and additives ====
In the 20th century, widespread public belief that artificial food coloring causes ADHD-like hyperactivity in children originated from Benjamin Feingold, a pediatric allergist from California, who proposed in 1973 that salicylates, artificial colors, and artificial flavors cause hyperactivity in children. However, there is no clinical evidence to support broad claims that food coloring causes food intolerance and ADHD-like behavior in children. It is possible that certain food colorings may act as a trigger in those who are genetically predisposed.

The UK's Food Standards Agency commissioned a study of six food dyes, dubbed the "Southampton 6" (tartrazine, Allura Red AC (Red 40), Ponceau 4R, Quinoline Yellow, sunset yellow, carmoisine), and sodium benzoate (a preservative) on children in the general population, who consumed them in beverages. The study found "a possible link between the consumption of these artificial colours and a sodium benzoate preservative and increased hyperactivity" in the children; the advisory committee to the FSA that evaluated the study also determined that because of study limitations, the results could not be extrapolated to the general population, and further testing was recommended.

== See also ==
- Hypoactivity
- Locomotor activity
