= Food coloring =

Substance used to color food or drink

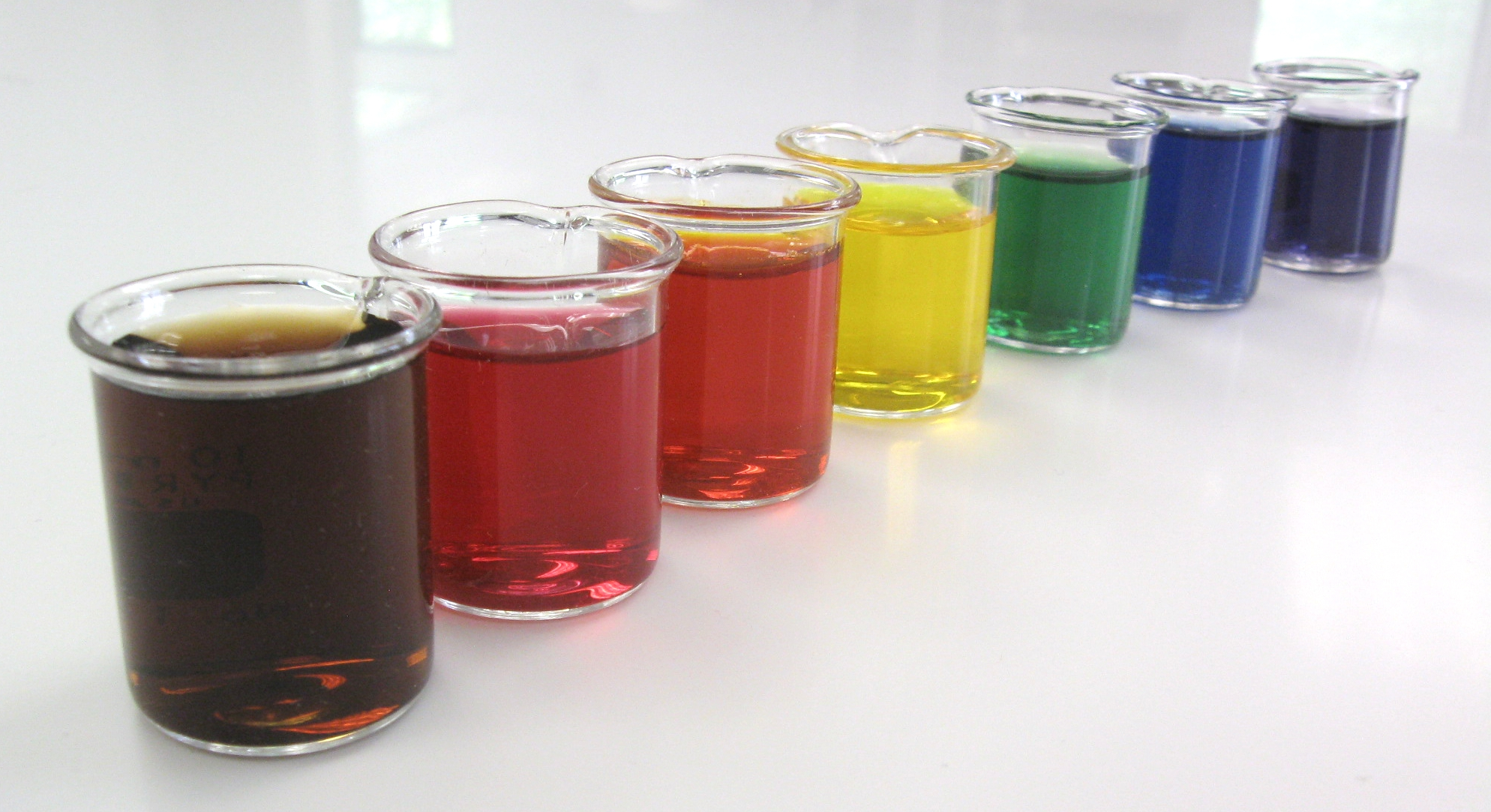
A variety of food colorings, added to beakers of water

Food coloring, color additive or colorant is any dye, pigment, or substance that imparts color when it is added to food or beverages. Colorants can be supplied as liquids, powders, gels, or pastes. Food coloring is commonly used in commercial products and in domestic cooking.

Food colorants are also used in various non-food applications, including cosmetics, pharmaceuticals, home craft projects, and medical devices. Some colorings may be natural, such as with carotenoids and anthocyanins extracted from plants or cochineal from insects, or may be synthesized, such as tartrazine yellow.

In the manufacturing of foods, beverages and cosmetics, the safety of colorants is under constant scientific review and certification by national regulatory agencies, such as the European Food Safety Authority (EFSA) and US Food and Drug Administration (FDA), and by international reviewers, such as the Joint FAO/WHO Expert Committee on Food Additives.

== Purpose of food coloring ==
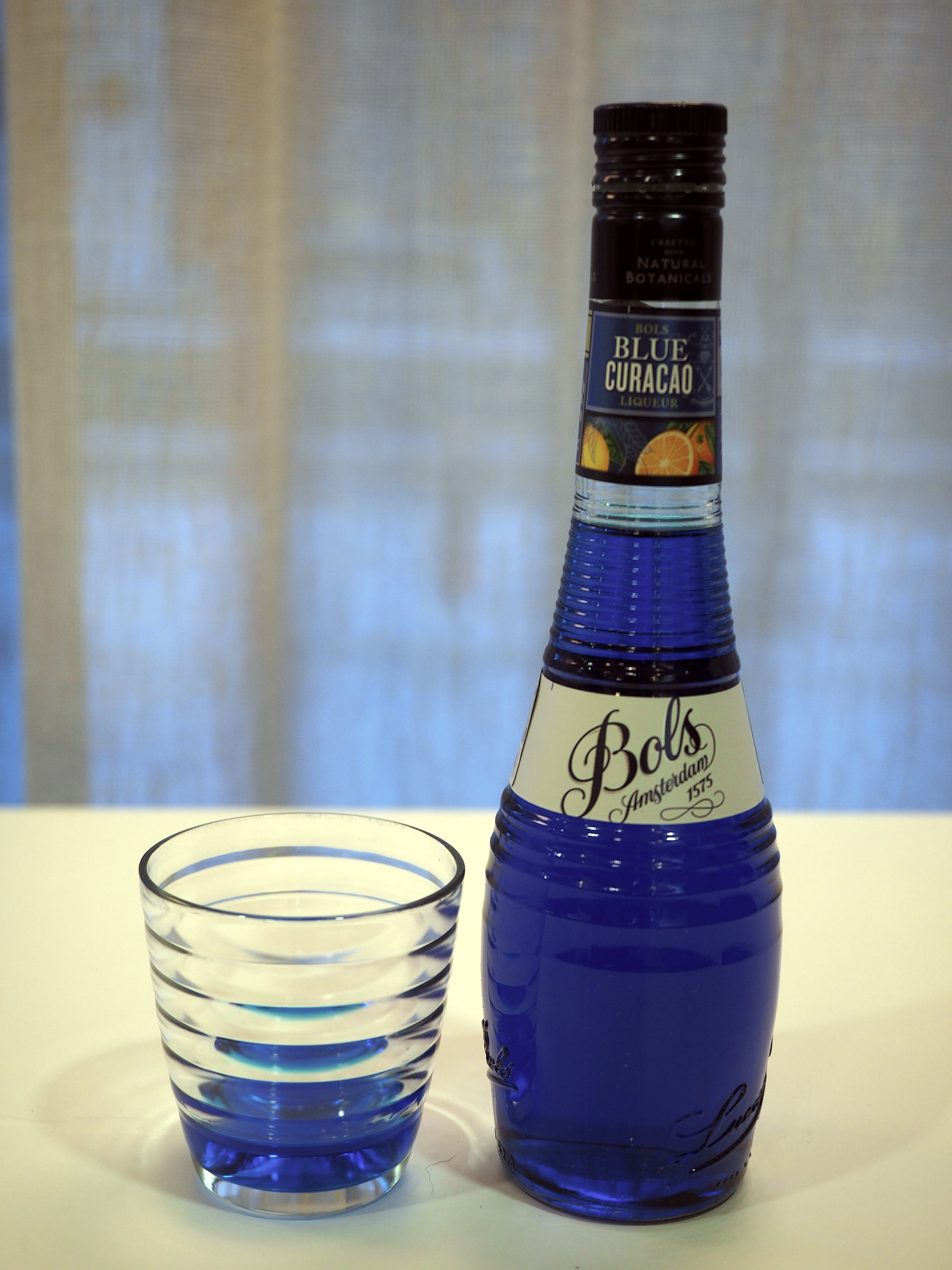
Blue Curaçao liqueur gets its trademark blue color from food coloring.

People associate certain colors with certain flavors, and the color of food can influence the perceived flavor in anything from candy to wine. Sometimes, the aim is to simulate a color that is perceived by the consumer as natural, such as adding red coloring to glacé cherries (which would otherwise be beige), but sometimes it is for effect, like the green ketchup that Heinz launched in 2000. Color additives are used in foods for many reasons including:

- Making food more attractive, appealing, or appetizing
- Offsetting color loss over time due to exposure to light, air, temperature extremes, moisture, or storage conditions
- Stabilizing natural variations in color
- Enhancing colors that occur naturally
- Providing color to colorless or "fun" foods
- Allowing products to be identified via sight, such as candy flavors or medicine dosages

== Natural food dyes ==
=== History ===
The addition of colorants to foods is thought to have occurred in Egyptian cities as early as 1500 BC, when candy makers added natural extracts and wine to improve the products' appearance. During the Middle Ages, the economy in the European countries was based on agriculture, and the peasants were accustomed to producing their own food locally or trading within the village communities. Under feudalism, aesthetic aspects were not considered, at least not by the vast majority of the generally very poor population. This situation changed with urbanization at the beginning of the Modern Age, when trade emerged—especially the import of precious spices and colors. One of the first food laws, created in Augsburg, Germany, in 1531, concerned spices or colorants and required saffron counterfeiters to be burned to death.

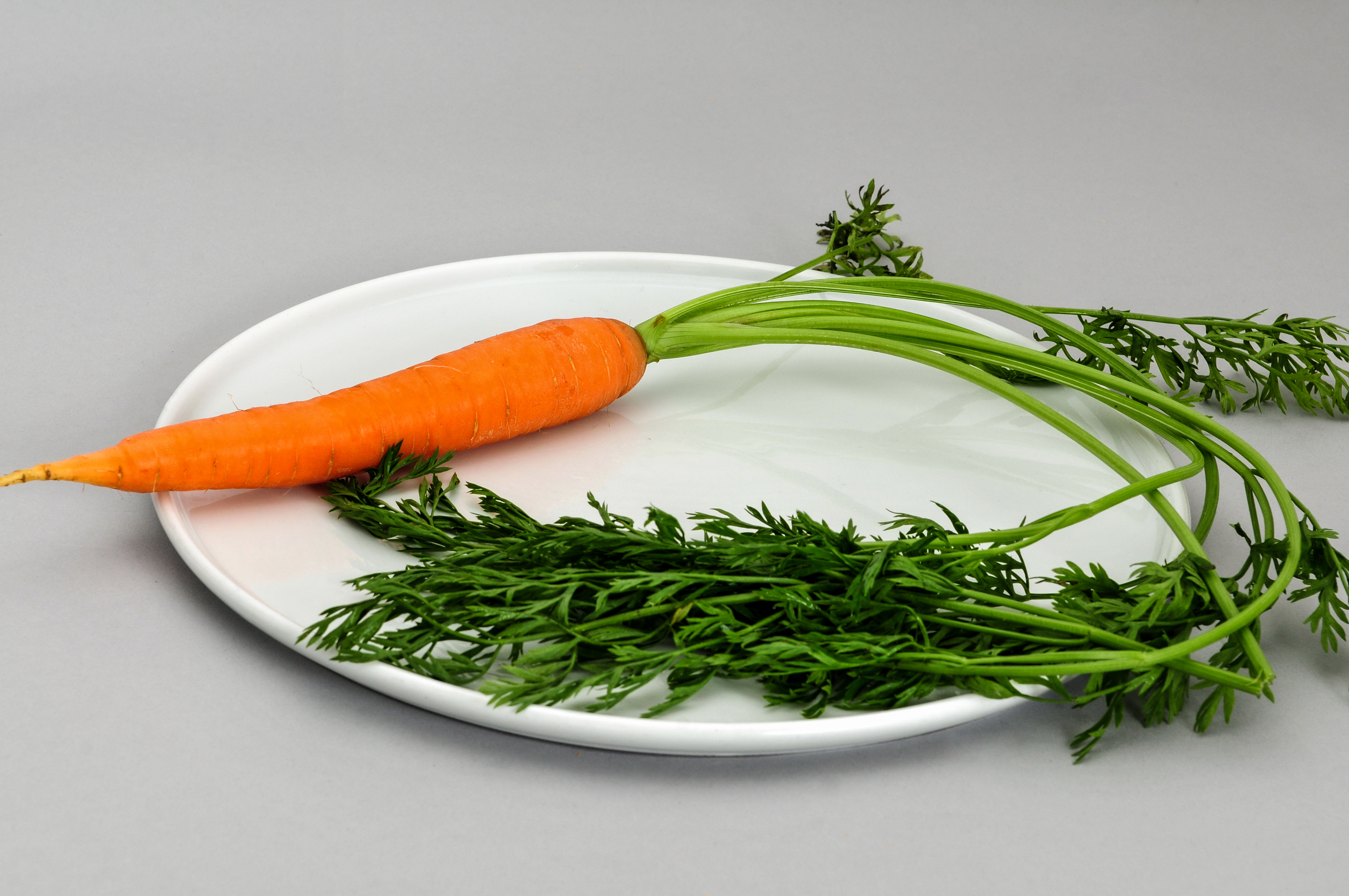
The orange color of carrots and many other fruits and vegetables arises from carotenoids.

=== Natural colorants ===
Carotenoids (E160, E161, E164), chlorophyllin (E140, E141), anthocyanins (E163), and betanin (E162) comprise four main categories of plant pigments grown to color food products. Other colorants or specialized derivatives of these core groups include:

- Annatto (E160b), a reddish-orange dye made from the seed of the achiote
- Caramel coloring (E150a-d), made from caramelized sugar
- Carmine (E120), a red dye derived from the cochineal insect, Dactylopius coccus
- Elderberry juice (E163)
- Lycopene (E160d)
- Paprika (E160c)
- Turmeric/curcumin (E100)
- Calcium phosphate, a white mineral
- Galdieria extract, a blue color derived from algae
- Butterfly pea flower extract, a blue color made from dried flower petals

Natural blue colorants are rare. The pigment genipin, present in the fruit of Gardenia jasminoides, can be treated with amino acids to produce the blue pigment gardenia blue, which is approved for use in Japan and the US, but not the EU.

To ensure reproducibility, the colored components of these substances are often provided in highly purified form. For stability and convenience, they can be formulated in suitable carrier materials (solid and liquids). Hexane, acetone, and other solvents break down cell walls in the fruit and vegetables and allow for maximum extraction of the coloring. Traces of these may still remain in the finished colorant, but they do not need to be declared on the product label. These solvents are known as carry-over ingredients.

=== Chemical structures of representative natural colorants ===
Food colorants, natural

Betanin, a magenta dye, mainly produced from beets

Anthocyanin, a red to blue dye depending on functional groups and pH

Beta-carotene, a yellow to orange colorant

== Artificial food colorants ==
=== History ===
With the onset of the industrial revolution, people became dependent on foods produced by others. Populations living in large cities required consistent, low cost food options and, at that time, few regulations were in place to control and monitor the food supply. The analytical methods needed to detect and identify artificially colored foods did not yet exist, therefore, the adulteration of foods flourished. Heavy metal and other inorganic element-containing compounds turned out to be cheap and suitable to "restore" the color of watered-down milk and other foodstuffs, some more lurid examples being:

- Red lead (Pb_{3}O_{4}) and vermillion (HgS) were routinely used to color cheese and confectionery.
- Copper arsenite (CuHAsO_{3}) was used to recolor used tea leaves for resale. It also caused two deaths when used to color a dessert in 1860.

Sellers at the time offered more than 80 artificial coloring agents, some invented for dyeing textiles, not foods.

Thus, with potted meat, fish and sauces taken at breakfast he would consume more or less Armenian bole, red lead, or even bisulphuret of mercury [vermillion, HgS]. At dinner with his curry or cayenne he would run the chance of a second dose of lead or mercury; with pickles, bottled fruit and vegetables he would be nearly sure to have copper administrated to him; and while he partook of bon-bons at dessert, there was no telling of the number of poisonous pigments he might consume. Again his tea if mixed or green, he would certainly not escape without the administration of a little Prussian blue...

Many color additives had never been tested for toxicity or other adverse effects. Historical records show that injuries, even deaths, resulted from tainted colorants. In 1851, about 200 people were poisoned in England, 17 of them fatally, directly as a result of eating adulterated lozenges. In 1856, mauveine, the first synthetic color, was developed by Sir William Henry Perkin and by the turn of the century, unmonitored color additives had spread through Europe and the United States in all sorts of popular foods, including ketchup, mustard, jellies, and wine. Originally, these were dubbed 'coal-tar' colors because the starting materials were obtained from bituminous coal.

Compared to natural dyes, synthetic dyes are often less costly because they are intense, requiring very small concentrations.

=== Chemical structures of representative artificial colorants ===
Food colorants, synthetic

Indigo carmine, blue

Allura Red AC, red

Quinoline Yellow WS, yellow

== Regulation ==
=== History: 19th and 20th centuries ===
Concerns over food safety led to numerous regulations throughout the world. German food regulations released in 1882 stipulated the exclusion of dangerous "minerals" such as arsenic, copper, chromium, lead, mercury, and zinc, which were frequently used as ingredients in colorants. In contrast to today's regulatory guidelines, these first laws followed the principle of a negative listing (substances not allowed for use); they were already driven by the main principles of today's food regulations all over the world, since all of these regulations follow the same goal: the protection of consumers from toxic substances and from fraud. Following the Pure Food and Drug Act of 1906, the United States introduced Food Inspection Decision (F.I.D.) 76, which included a list of seven "straight colors" approved for use in food. The seven dyes were Ponceau 3R (FD&C Red No. 1), amaranth (FD&C Red No. 2), erythrosine (FD&C Red No. 3), indigotine (FD&C Blue No. 2), light green SF (FD&C Green No. 2), naphthol yellow 1 (FD&C Yellow No. 1), and orange 1 (FD&C Orange No. 1). Even with updated food laws, adulteration continued for many years.

In the 20th century, improved chemical analysis and testing led to the replacement of the negative lists by positive listings. Positive lists consist of substances allowed to be used for the production and the improvement of foods. Most prevailing legislations are based on positive listing. Positive listing implies that substances meant for human consumption have been tested for their safety, and that they have to meet specified purity criteria prior to their approval by the corresponding authorities. In 1962, the first EU directive (62/2645/EEC) approved 36 colorants, of which 20 were naturally derived and 16 were synthetic. This directive did not list which food products the colorants could or could not be used in. At that time, each member state could designate where certain colors could and could not be used. In Germany, for example, quinoline yellow was allowed in puddings and desserts, but tartrazine was not. The reverse was true in France. This was updated in 1989 with 89/107/EEC, which concerned food additives authorized for use in foodstuffs.

=== Status as of 2024 ===
Naturally derived colors, most of which have been used traditionally for centuries, are exempt from certification by several regulatory bodies throughout the world, such as the FDA. Included in the exempt category are colors or pigments from vegetables, minerals, or animals, such as annatto extract (yellow), beets (purple), beta-carotene (yellow to orange), and grape skin extract (purple).

Synthetic food colorings are typically less expensive to manufacture, but require closer scientific scrutiny for safety and are certified for use in food manufacturing in the United States, United Kingdom, and European Union.

=== Global market ===
The global market for food coloring is anticipated to grow from $4.6 billion in 2023 to $6 billion by 2028. This expansion is primarily driven by increasing consumer demand for visually appealing food products. Home chefs, particularly those active on social media, are seeking vibrant colors to enhance the aesthetic appeal of their homemade snacks and treats. Additionally, large food brands incorporate vivid colors into their products to stand out in a competitive market.

=== National regulations ===
==== Canada ====
Canada has published food and drug regulations covering food colorants.

Food in Canada cannot be sold with more than:

- 100 ppm of fast green FCF or brilliant blue FCF. or any combination
- 300 ppm of allura red, amaranth, erythrosine, indigotine, sunset yellow FCF or tartrazine and Fast Green FCF or brilliant blue FCF combined
- 150 ppm of ponceau SX dye.

==== European Union ====
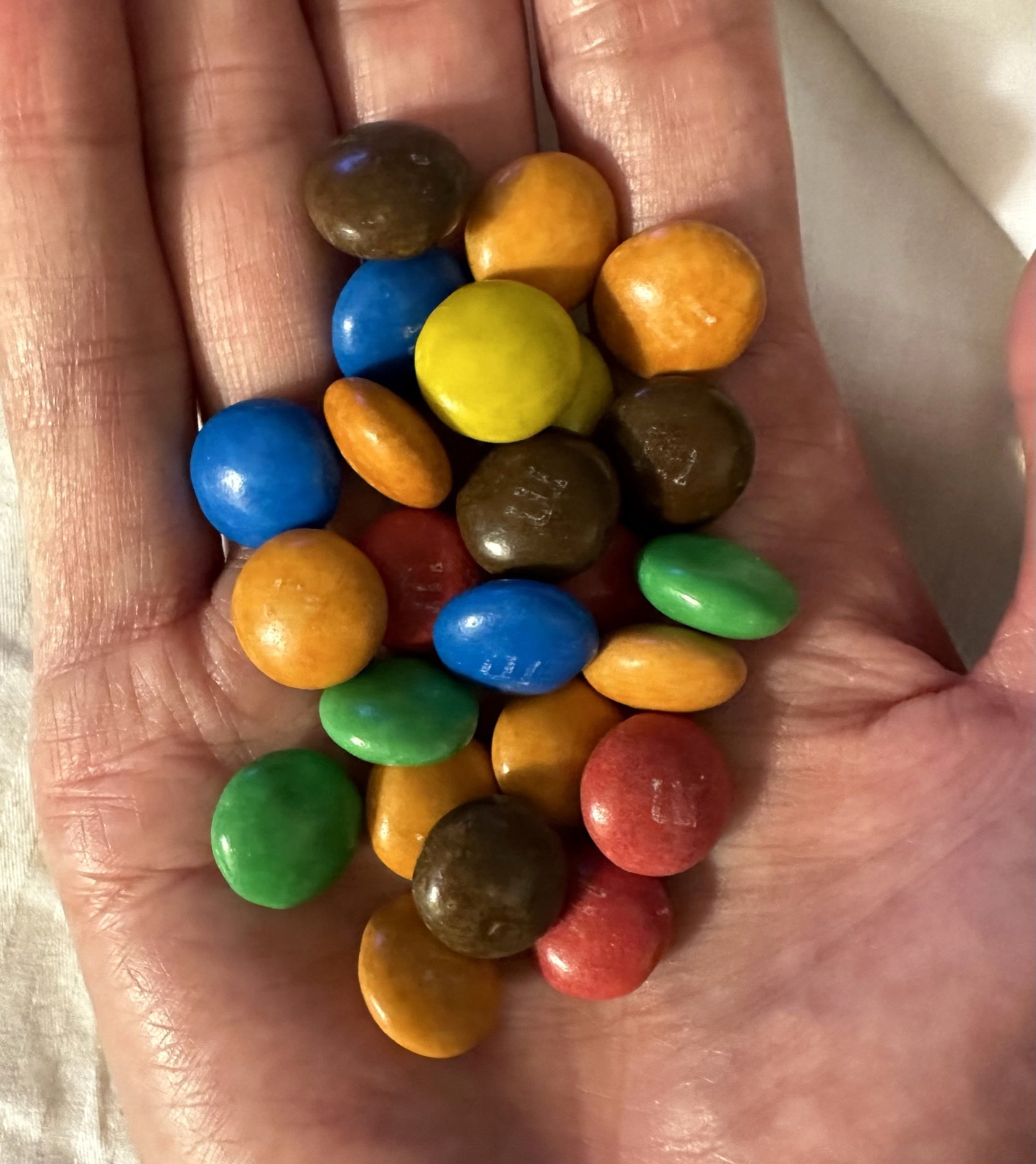
Due to European Union regulations on food coloring, European M&M's have darker colors than American M&M's.

In the European Union, E numbers are used for all additives, both synthetic and natural, that are approved in food applications. E numbers beginning with 1, such as E100 (turmeric) or E161b (lutein), are allocated to colorants. The safety of food colors and other food additives in the EU is evaluated by the European Food Safety Authority (EFSA). Color Directive 94/36/EC, enacted by the European Commission in 1994, outlines permitted natural and artificial colors with their approved applications and limits in different foods. This is binding on all member countries of the EU; any changes have to be implemented into national laws by a specified deadline. In non-EU member states, food additives are regulated by national authorities, which usually, but not always, try to harmonize with EU regulations. Most other countries have their own regulations and list of food colors which can be used in various applications, including maximum daily intake limits.

Permitted synthetic colorants in the EU include E numbers 102–143 which cover the range of artificial colors. The EU maintains a list of allowed additives. Some artificial dyes approved for food use in the EU include:

- E104: Quinoline Yellow WS
- E122: Carmoisine
- E124: Ponceau 4R
- E131: Patent Blue V
- E142: Green S

The three synthetic colors Orange B, Citrus Red No. 2 and FD&C Green No. 3 are not permitted in the EU, nor is toasted partially-defatted cooked cottonseed flour.

==== India ====
The Food Safety and Standard Act, 2011 in India generally permits eight artificial colorings in food:

SL No.	Color	Common name	INS No.	Color Index	Chemical class
1	Red	Ponceau 4R	124	16255	Azo
		Carmoisine	122	14720	Azo
		Erythrosine	127	45430	Xanthene
2	Yellow	Tartrazine	102	19140	Pyrazolone
		Sunset yellow FCF	110	15985	Azo
3	Blue	Indigo carmine	132	73015	Indigoid
		Brilliant blue FCF	133	42090	Triarylmethane
4	Green	Fast green FCF	143	42053	Triarylmethane

==== United States ====
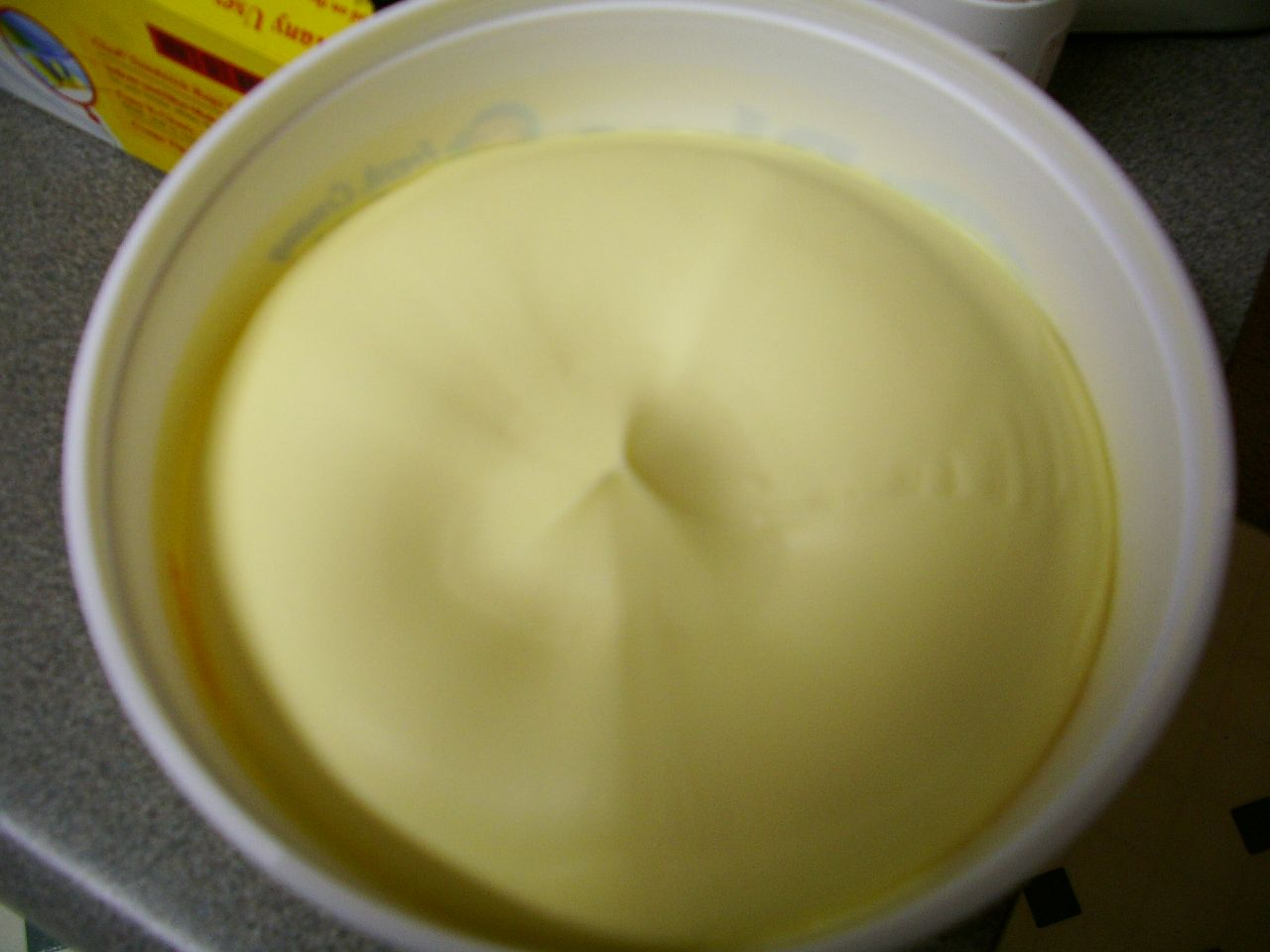
The addition of food coloring, such as beta-carotene, gives naturally white margarine a yellow, butter-like color.

The FDA permitted colors are classified as subject to certification or exempt from certification in Code of Federal Regulations – Title 21 Part 73 & 74, both of which are subject to rigorous safety standards prior to their approval and listing for use in foods.

In the United States, FD&C numbers (which indicate that the FDA has approved the colorant for use in foods, drugs and cosmetics) are given to approved synthetic food dyes that do not exist in nature.

Currently permitted synthetic colorants include the following seven artificial colorings (the most common in bold). The lakes of these colorings are also permitted except the lake of Red No. 3. The United States Secretary of Health and Human Services is looking to phase out all of these by 2026 (2027 for Red No. 3), and the Food and Drug Administration is planning on authorizing four new colorings before then.

- **FD&C Blue No. 1** – Brilliant blue FCF, E133 (blue shade)
- FD&C Blue No. 2 – Indigotine, E132 (indigo shade)
- FD&C Green No. 3 – Fast green FCF, E143 (turquoise shade)
- FD&C Red No. 3 – Erythrosine, E127 (pink shade, commonly used in glacé cherries) In August 2026, the FDA denied objections and requests for public hearings concerning the 2025 revocation of the authorization for FD&C Red No. 3 and removed the administrative stay on the order.
- **FD&C Red No. 40** – Allura red AC, E129 (red shade)
- **FD&C Yellow No. 5** – Tartrazine, E102 (yellow shade)
- **FD&C Yellow No. 6** – Sunset yellow FCF, E110 (orange shade)

Two dyes are allowed by the FDA for limited applications:

- Citrus red 2 (orange shade) – allowed only to color orange peels.
- Orange B (red shade) – allowed only for use in hot dog and sausage casings (not produced after 1978, but not delisted)

Many dyes have been delisted for a variety of reasons, ranging from poor coloring properties to regulatory restrictions. Some of these delisted food colorants are:

- FD&C Red No. 2 – Amaranth, E123
- FD&C Red No. 4 – Scarlet GN, E125
- FD&C Red No. 32 was used to color Florida oranges.
- FD&C Orange Number 1 was one of the first water-soluble dyes to be commercialized, and one of seven original food dyes allowed under the Pure Food and Drug Act of June 30, 1906.
- FD&C Orange No. 2 was used to color Florida oranges.
- FD&C Yellow No. 1, 2, 3, and 4
- FD&C Violet No. 1

===== State level action =====
Multiple states have implemented regulations to either limit or ban access to synthetic food dyes. For example, California, implemented regulations restricting certain artificial dyes due to concerns about their impact on children's behavior. On 25 March 2025, West Virginia became the first state to enact a comprehensive ban on certain artificial dyes and preservatives. Louisiana and Texas passed legislation requiring warning labels for 44 articial dyes, additives, and preservatives.

=== Global harmonization ===
Since the beginning of the 1960s, the Joint FAO/WHO Expert Committee on Food Additives has promoted the development of international standards for food additives, not only by its toxicological assessments, which are continuously published by the World Health Organization in a "Technical Report Series", but furthermore by elaborating appropriate purity criteria, which are laid down in the two volumes of the "Compendium of Food Additive Specifications" and their supplements. These specifications are not legally binding but very often serve as a guiding principle, especially in countries where no scientific expert committees have been established.

To further regulate the use of these evaluated additives, in 1962 the WHO and FAO created an international commission, the Codex Alimentarius, which is composed of authorities, food industry associations and consumer groups from all over the world. Within the Codex organization, the Codex Committee for Food Additives and Contaminants is responsible for working out recommendations for the application of food additives: the General Standard for Food Additives. In the light of the World Trade Organizations General Agreement on Tariffs and Trade (GATT), the Codex Standard, although not legally binding, influences food color regulations all over the world.

=== Safety evaluation ===
A 2023 update by the FDA on food colorants required safety assurances by manufacturers and restrictions on the types of foods in which colorants are used, their maximum amounts and labeling, batch certification, and the amount needed to attain the desired food coloring. Scientific consensus regards that food color additives are safe under the restrictions for use, and that most children have no adverse effects when consuming foods with color ingredients; some individual studies, however, indicate that certain children may have allergic sensitivities to colorants. In October 2023, the state of California banned the colorant, Red 3, in food products starting in 2027. Specific federal guidance on color additives is under the FD&C Act, with Redbook 2000 outlining required safety assessments.

In the 20th century, widespread public belief that artificial food coloring causes ADHD-like hyperactivity in children originated from Benjamin Feingold, a pediatric allergist from California, who proposed in 1973 that salicylates, artificial colors, and artificial flavors cause hyperactivity in children. However, there is no clinical evidence to support broad claims that food coloring causes food intolerance and ADHD-like behavior in children. It is possible that certain food colorings may act as a trigger in those who are genetically predisposed.

Concerns were expressed again in 2011 that food colorings may cause ADHD-like behavior in children; a 2015 literature review found the evidence inconclusive. The UK Food Standards Agency examined the effects of tartrazine, allura red, ponceau 4R, quinoline yellow, sunset yellow and carmoisine on children. These colorants are found in beverages. The study found "a possible link between the consumption of these artificial colours and a sodium benzoate preservative and increased hyperactivity" in the children; the advisory committee to the FSA that evaluated the study also determined that because of study limitations, the results could not be extrapolated to the general population, and further testing was recommended. After continuous review as of 2024, the FSA stated that the above artificial food colors may induce hyperactivity in some children. Food and drink products containing any of the six designated colors must warn consumers on the package labels, stating May have an adverse effect on activity and attention in children.

The European regulatory community, with an emphasis on the precautionary principle, required labeling and temporarily reduced the acceptable daily intake for the food colorings; the UK FSA called for voluntary withdrawal of the colorings by food manufacturers. However, in 2009, the European Food Safety Authority re-evaluated the data at hand and determined that "the available scientific evidence does not substantiate a link between the color additives and behavioral effects" for any of the dyes.

=== Titanium dioxide ===
In 2016, EFSA updated its safety assessment of titanium dioxide (E 171), concluding that it can no longer be considered safe as a food additive. As of 2024, the FDA was evaluating a petition to exclude titanium dioxide from use in foods, beverages or cosmetics in the United States.

== See also ==
- Azo compound
- Acid dye
- E number
- Federal Food, Drug, and Cosmetic Act
- Food additive
