= C20H11N2Na3O10S3 =

The molecular formula C_{20}H_{11}N_{2}Na_{3}O_{10}S_{3} (molar mass: 604.47 g/mol, exact mass: 603.9269 u) may refer to:

- Amaranth (dye)
- Ponceau 4R
