= Ponceau =

Ponceau (French for "poppy-colored") may refer to:

- Ponceau 2R (also called Xylidine ponceau or Ponceau G, among other synonyms), azo dye used in histology for staining
- Ponceau 3R, delisted food colorant
- Ponceau 4R (known by more than 100 synonyms), synthetic colourant used as a food colouring (E Number E124)
- Ponceau 6R (Ponceau 6R or Crystal ponceau 6R, among other synonyms), food dye (E number E126) and histology stain
- Ponceau S (also known as Acid Red 112 or C.I. 27195), histology stain
- Ponceau SX, another name for Scarlet GN, once used as a food dye (E number E125)
