= Johann Heinrich Ziegler =

Swiss dye chemist and natural philosopher

Johann Heinrich Ziegler (6 December 1857 in Winterthur – 30 January 1936 in Zurich) was a Swiss dye chemist and natural philosopher.

== Life ==
Johann Heinrich Ziegler was born as the son of the manufacturer Emil Ziegler. He studied chemistry and received his doctorate in 1883 in Erlangen, with his dissertation Ueber Derivate des Beta-Naphthylamins (on derivatives of beta-naphthylamine), under the later Nobel Prize winner Emil Fischer.

In 1884, Ziegler developed the yellow azo dye tartrazine in the laboratories of the Bindschedler'sche Fabrik fürchemische Industrie in Basel (CIBA). This was patented and produced in Germany by BASF in 1885 (DRP 34294). The process was first presented in 1887 in Chemische Berichte, the journal of the German Chemical Society. Although the structure proposed by Ziegler was not confirmed, he was able to develop an alternative synthesis of tartrazine based on the idea that a hydrazone is the tautomeric form of an azo compound (azo-hydrazo tautomerism). This production process was patented in 1893 (British Patent 5693). Tartrazine was initially used as a lightfast wool dye and later as a food coloring.

Ziegler worked for several years as a color chemist in Basel and ran a company in Höngg before he became a private scientist at the turn of the century, searching for a universal formula.

In 1901, Ziegler first presented his so-called primordial light theory, based on the constant speed of the immaterial primordial light in etherless space. From this theory, he developed what he considered to be a universal world formula, with which he believed he had solved the relationship between light and matter, color and chemical constitution. However, this was not recognized by science. Ziegler raised accusations of plagiarism against Albert Einstein's theory of relativity, which he later fiercely opposed, as well as against the color theory of the chemist and Nobel Prize winner Wilhelm Ostwald.

Ziegler became a member of the Natural Science Society in Zurich in 1921.

== Publications ==
- Die wahre Einheit von Religion und Wissenschaft, 1. Auflage (The true unity of religion and science, 1st edition), Orell Füssli, Zürich 1905, including 4 essays:
  - Über den eigentlichen Begriff der Natur (On the actual concept of nature)
  - Über das wahre Wesen der sog. Schwerkraft (On the true nature of so-called gravity)
  - Über das wahre System der chemischen Elemente (On the true system of chemical elements)
  - Über den Sonnengott von Sippar (About the Sun God of Sippar)
- Die wahre Ursache der hellen Lichtstrahlung des Radiums. 2. Auflage (The true cause of the bright light radiation of radium. 2nd edition), Orell Füssli, Zürich 1905, 54 pages, OCLC 72399323.
- Das Ding an sich und das Ende der sogenannten Relativitätstheorie (The thing in itself and the end of the so-called theory of relativity). Weltformel-Verlag, Zürich 1923, 32 pages, OCLC 249974059.
