= Sunset yellow FCF =

Chemical compound used as colorant

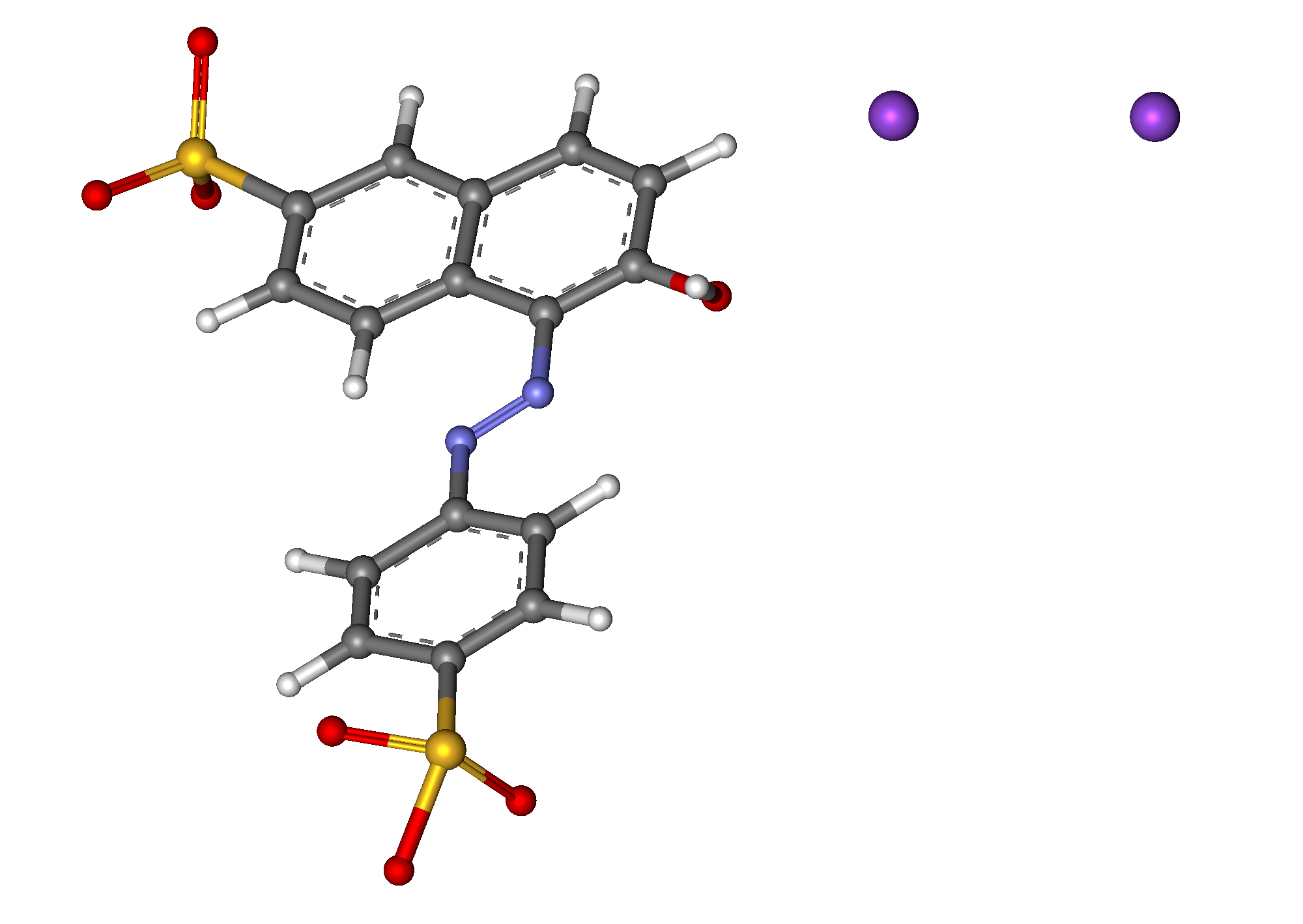

Names
- IUPAC name Disodium 6-hydroxy-5-[(4-sulfophenyl)azo]-2-naphthalenesulfonate
- Other names: Orange Yellow S; FD&C Yellow 6; C.I. 15985; E110

Identifiers
CAS Number	2783-94-0
3D model (JSmol)	Interactive image
ChEMBL	ChEMBL1371409
ChemSpider	11431290
ECHA InfoCard	100.018.629
E number	E110 (colours)
KEGG	C19531
PubChem CID	6093232
UNII	H77VEI93A8
CompTox Dashboard (EPA)	DTXSID6021456
- InChI: InChI=1S/C16H12N2O7S2.2Na/c19-15-8-1-10-9-13(27(23,24)25)6-7-14(10)16(15)18-17-11-2-4-12(5-3-11)26(20,21)22;;/h1-9,19H,(H,20,21,22)(H,23,24,25);;/q;2*+1/p-2/b18-17+;; Key: OIQPTROHQCGFEF-QIKYXUGXSA-L; InChI=1/C16H12N2O7S2.2Na/c19-15-8-1-10-9-13(27(23,24)25)6-7-14(10)16(15)18-17-11-2-4-12(5-3-11)26(20,21)22;;/h1-9,19H,(H,20,21,22)(H,23,24,25);;/q;2*+1/p-2/b18-17+;; Key: OIQPTROHQCGFEF-JLAJEUQUBH
- SMILES: [Na+].[Na+].[O-]S(=O)(=O)c1ccc(cc1)/N=N/c2c3ccc(cc3ccc2O)S([O-])(=O)=O

Properties
Chemical formula	C_{16}H_{10}N_{2}Na_{2}O_{7}S_{2}
Molar mass	452.36 g·mol^{−1}
Melting point	300 °C (572 °F; 573 K)

Hazards
NFPA 704 (fire diamond)	2 1 0
- Except where otherwise noted, data are given for materials in their standard state (at 25 °C [77 °F], 100 kPa). verify (what is ?) Infobox references

Sunset yellow FCF (also known as orange yellow S, or C.I. 15985) is a petroleum-derived orange azo dye with a pH-dependent maximum absorption at about 480 nm at pH 1 and 443 nm at pH 13, with a shoulder at 500 nm. When added to foods sold in the United States, it is known as FD&C Yellow 6; when sold in Europe, it is denoted by E Number E110.

== Uses ==
Sunset yellow is used in foods, cosmetics, and drugs. Sunset yellow FCF is used as an orange or yellow-orange dye. For example, it is used in candy, desserts, snacks, sauces, and preserved fruits. Sunset yellow is often used in conjunction with E123, amaranth, to produce a brown colouring in both chocolates and caramel.

== Safety ==
The acceptable daily intake (ADI) is 0–4 mg/kg under both EU and WHO/FAO guidelines. Sunset yellow FCF has no known carcinogenicity, genotoxicity, or developmental toxicity in the amounts at which it is used.

It has been claimed since the late 1970s, under the advocacy of Benjamin Feingold, that sunset yellow FCF causes food intolerance and ADHD-like behavior in children, but there is little scientific evidence to support these broad claims. It is possible that certain food colorings may act as a trigger in those who are genetically predisposed, but the evidence is weak.

== Regulation as food additive ==
=== Europe ===
"European Parliament and Council Directive 94/36/EC of 30 June 1994 on colours for use in foodstuffs" harmonized rules and approved Sunset Yellow FCF for use in foodstuffs in the whole of the European Union. Before that time, approved amounts was up to each country, but naming and composition was standardized.

Sunset yellow FCF was not approved in Norway before 2001. That was the time when the 94/36/EC directive of 1994 was included in EFTA (now EEC) rules and came into effect, after years of delaying tactics from the Norwegian side and a heated political debate.

In 2008, the Food Standards Agency of the UK called for food manufacturers to voluntarily stop using six food additive colours, tartrazine, allura red, ponceau 4R, quinoline yellow WS, sunset yellow and carmoisine (dubbed the "Southampton 6") by 2009, and provided a document to assist in replacing the colors with other colors.

An EU regulation came into effect in 2010 mandating that food manufacturers include a label on foods containing the Southampton 6 stating: "may have an adverse effect on activity and attention in children".

=== United States ===
Sunset yellow FCF is known as FD&C yellow No. 6 in the US and is approved for use in coloring food, drugs, and cosmetics with an acceptable daily intake of 3.75 mg/kg.

== Society and culture ==
Since the 1970s and the well-publicized advocacy of Benjamin Feingold, there has been public concern that food colorings may cause ADHD-like behavior in children. These concerns have led the FDA and other food safety authorities to regularly review the scientific literature, and led the UK FSA to commission a study by researchers at Southampton University of the effect of a mixture of the "Southampton 6" and sodium benzoate (a preservative) on children in the general population who consumed them in beverages; the study was published in 2007. The study found "a possible link between the consumption of these artificial colours and a sodium benzoate preservative and increased hyperactivity" in the children; the advisory committee to the FSA that evaluated the study also determined that because of study limitations, the results could not be extrapolated to the general population, and further testing was recommended".

The European regulatory community, with a stronger emphasis on the precautionary principle, required labelling and temporarily reduced the acceptable daily intake (ADI) for the food colorings; the UK FSA called for voluntary withdrawal of the colorings by food manufacturers. However, in 2009 the EFSA re-evaluated the data at hand and determined that "the available scientific evidence does not substantiate a link between the color additives and behavioral effects" and in 2014 after further review of the data, the EFSA restored the prior ADI levels.

The US FDA did not make changes following the publication of the Southampton study, but following a citizen petition filed by the Center for Science in the Public Interest in 2008, requesting the FDA to ban several food additives, the FDA commenced a review of the available evidence, and still made no changes.

== See also ==
- Sulfarsazene, a metal indicator
- Tartrazine, also known as Yellow 5
