= E-102 =

E-102 can refer to:

- E-102 Gamma, a character in the Sonic the Hedgehog video game series.
- E102, the E number for tartrazine.
