= E126 =

E126 or E-126 may refer to:

- Unbihexium, a hypothetical chemical element with atomic number 126
- Ponceau 6R, a red dye sometimes used as a food colorant with E number E126
- Enercon E-126, a wind turbine
