= Quinoline Yellow WS =

"Mixture of water-soluble organic compounds from Quinoline Yellow dye"

Names
- IUPAC name Sodium 2-(1,3-dioxoindan-2-yl)quinolinedisulfonate
- Other names: C.I. Acid Yellow 3; Food Yellow 13; D&C Yellow No. 10; Acid yellow 3; Quinidine Yellow KT; Japan Yellow 203; Lemon Yellow ZN 3; C.I. 47005

Identifiers
CAS Number	8004-92-0
3D model (JSmol)	Interactive image
ChemSpider	23070
ECHA InfoCard	100.116.526
EC Number	305-897-5
E number	E104 (colours)
PubChem CID	24671
UNII	35SW5USQ3G
CompTox Dashboard (EPA)	DTXSID70873122 DTXSID0041721, DTXSID70873122
- InChI: InChI=1S/C18H11NO8S2.2Na/c20-17-11-3-1-2-4-12(11)18(21)15(17)13-6-5-9-7-10(28(22,23)24)8-14(16(9)19-13)29(25,26)27;;/h1-8,15H,(H,22,23,24)(H,25,26,27);;/q;2*+1/p-2 Key: FZUOVNMHEAPVBW-UHFFFAOYSA-L; InChI=1/C18H11NO8S2.2Na/c20-17-11-3-1-2-4-12(11)18(21)15(17)13-6-5-9-7-10(28(22,23)24)8-14(16(9)19-13)29(25,26)27;;/h1-8,15H,(H,22,23,24)(H,25,26,27);;/q;2*+1/p-2 Key: FZUOVNMHEAPVBW-NUQVWONBAX
- SMILES: [Na+].[Na+].[O-]S(=O)(=O)c1cc(cc2ccc(nc12)C4C(=O)c3ccccc3C4=O)S([O-])(=O)=O

Properties
Chemical formula	C_{18}H_{13}NO_{5/8/11}S_{1/2/3}Na_{1/2/3}
Molar mass	477.38 g/mol
Appearance	Greenish yellow powder
Melting point	150 °C (302 °F; 423 K) (decomposes)
Solubility in water	Soluble
Acidity (pK_{a})	1.8

Hazards
- GHS labelling
Pictograms	(GHS07: Exclamation mark)
Signal word	Warning
Hazard statements	H302
Precautionary statements	P264, P270, P301+P312, P501
- Except where otherwise noted, data are given for materials in their standard state (at 25 °C [77 °F], 100 kPa). verify (what is ?) Infobox references

Quinoline Yellow WS (/ˈkwɪnəliːn/) is a mixture of organic compounds derived from the dye Quinoline Yellow SS (spirit soluble). Owing to the presence of sulfonate groups, the WS dyes are water-soluble (WS). It is a mixture of disulfonates (principally), monosulfonates and trisulfonates of 2-(2-quinolyl)indan-1,3-dione with a maximum absorption wavelength of 416 nm.^{p. 119}

== Uses ==
Quinoline Yellow is used as a greenish yellow food additive in certain countries, designated in Europe as the E number E104. In the EU and Australia, Quinoline Yellow is permitted in beverages and is used in foods, like sauces, decorations, and coatings; Quinoline Yellow is not listed as a permitted food additive in Canada or the US, where it is permitted in medicines and cosmetics and is known as D&C Yellow 10.

== Health effects ==
Quinoline Yellow WS has not been associated with any significant long-term toxicity, is not genotoxic or carcinogenic and there is no evidence of adverse effects on reproduction or development. Food colorants in general have been the subject of much scrutiny for their effect on health.

=== Possible cause of hyperactivity ===
Since the 1970s and the well-publicized advocacy of Benjamin Feingold, there has been public concern that food colorings may cause ADHD-like behavior in children. These concerns have led the U.S. FDA and other food safety authorities to regularly review the scientific literature, and led the UK FSA to commission a study by researchers at the University of Southampton to assess the effect of a mixture of six food dyes (Tartrazine, Allura Red, Ponceau 4R, Quinoline Yellow WS, Sunset Yellow FCF and Carmoisine (dubbed the "Southampton 6")) and sodium benzoate (a preservative) on children in the general population, who consumed them in beverages; the study published in 2007. The study found "a possible link between the consumption of these artificial colours and a sodium benzoate preservative and increased hyperactivity" in the children; the advisory committee to the FSA that evaluated the study also determined that because of study limitations, the results could not be extrapolated to the general population, and further testing was recommended".

The European regulatory community, with a stronger emphasis on the precautionary principle, required labelling and temporarily reduced the acceptable daily intake (ADI) for the food colorings; the UK FSA called for voluntary withdrawal of the colorings by food manufacturers. However, in 2009 the EFSA re-evaluated the data at hand and determined that "the available scientific evidence does not substantiate a link between the color additives and behavioral effects". On the basis of other evidence the EFSA also reduced the acceptable daily intake (ADI) from 10 to 0.5 mg/kg.

The US FDA did not make changes following the publication of the Southampton study, but following a citizen petition filed by the Center for Science in the Public Interest in 2008, requesting the FDA ban several food additives, the FDA commenced a review of the available evidence, and still made no changes.

No evidence supports broad claims that food coloring causes food intolerance and ADHD-like behavior in children. It is possible that certain food coloring may act as a trigger in those who are genetically predisposed, but the evidence is weak.
