= Allura Red AC =

Names
- Preferred IUPAC name Disodium 6-hydroxy-5-[(2-methoxy-5-methyl-4-sulfonatophenyl)diazenyl]naphthalene-2-sulfonate
- Other names: Disodium 6-hydroxy-5-[(2-methoxy-5-methyl-4-sulfophenyl)azo]-2-naphthalenesulfonate; Allura Red; Food Red 17; C.I. 16035; FD&C Red 40; E129; 2-Naphthalenesulfonic acid, 6-hydroxy-5-((2-methoxy-5-methyl-4-sulfophenyl)azo)-, disodium salt

Identifiers
CAS Number	25956-17-6
3D model (JSmol)	Interactive image
ChEMBL	ChEMBL174821
ChemSpider	11588224
ECHA InfoCard	100.043.047
E number	E129 (colours)
PubChem CID	33258
UNII	WZB9127XOA
CompTox Dashboard (EPA)	DTXSID4024436
- InChI: InChI=1S/C18H16N2O8S2.2Na/c1-10-7-14(16(28-2)9-17(10)30(25,26)27)19-20-18-13-5-4-12(29(22,23)24)8-11(13)3-6-15(18)21;;/h3-9,21H,1-2H3,(H,22,23,24)(H,25,26,27);;/q;2*+1/p-2/b20-19+;; Key: CEZCCHQBSQPRMU-LLIZZRELSA-L; InChI=1/C18H16N2O8S2.2Na/c1-10-7-14(16(28-2)9-17(10)30(25,26)27)19-20-18-13-5-4-12(29(22,23)24)8-11(13)3-6-15(18)21;;/h3-9,21H,1-2H3,(H,22,23,24)(H,25,26,27);;/q;2*+1/p-2/b20-19+;; Key: CEZCCHQBSQPRMU-JGGVBICHBN
- SMILES: [Na+].[Na+].COc3cc(c(C)cc3/N=N/c1c2ccc(cc2ccc1O)S([O-])(=O)=O)S([O-])(=O)=O

Properties
Chemical formula	C_{18}H_{14}N_{2}Na_{2}O_{8}S_{2}
Molar mass	496.42 g·mol^{−1}
Appearance	Red powder
Melting point	> 300 °C (572 °F; 573 K)

Hazards
NFPA 704 (fire diamond)	1 1 0
- Except where otherwise noted, data are given for materials in their standard state (at 25 °C [77 °F], 100 kPa). verify (what is ?) Infobox references

Allura Red AC is an organic compound classified as an azo compound and a disulfonate. Also known as FD&C Red 40 or E129, it is a red dye commonly used in food. It is usually supplied as its red sodium salt but can also be used as the calcium and potassium salts. These salts are soluble in water. In solution, its maximum absorbance lies at about 504 nm.

Allura Red AC was originally created by the Allied Chemical Corporation in 1971. In the European Union, it is approved, but it must carry a warning label. The US Food and Drug Administration considers it safe for use in food, drugs, and cosmetics. It has faced increasing pressure for removal from food in some areas, with California banning it in public schools.

== Production ==
Allura Red AC is manufactured by azo coupling between diazotized cresidinesulfonic acid and 2-naphthol-6-sulfonic acid. An Napthalenesulfonic acid is used for dye production in food products.

== Use as a consumable coloring agent ==
Allura Red AC is a popular dye used worldwide. Annual production in 1980 was greater than 2.3 million kilograms. It was introduced as a replacement for amaranth in the United States.

The European Union approved Allura Red AC as a food colorant in 1994, but EU countries' local laws banning food colorants were preserved until subsequent changes in the 2000s.

In the United States, Allura Red AC (also known as FD&C Red #40) is approved by the FDA for use in cosmetics, drugs, and food. When prepared as a lake pigment, it is disclosed as Red 40 Lake or Red 40 Aluminum Lake. It is used in some tattoo inks and is used in many products, such as cotton candy, soft drinks, candy, cherry-flavored products, children's medications, and dairy products. It is occasionally used to dye medicinal tablets to help with identification, such as with fexofenadine, an antihistamine. It is by far the most commonly used red dye in the United States, completely replacing amaranth (Red 2) and also replacing erythrosine (Red 3) in most applications due to the negative health effects of those two dyes.

== History ==
Allura Red AC was developed in 1971 by the Allied Chemical Corporation as a replacement for amaranth, which the FDA banned for carcinogenicity in 1976. Allura Red AC also allowed for cheaper and faster production and lasted longer in food products.

Since the 2000s, Allura Red AC is the most commonly used red dye. Throughout its history, it has consistently been used in sweets such as candies and jellies.

== Studies on safety ==
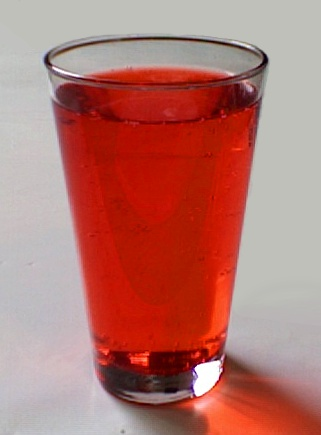
Allura Red AC is the coloring additive in this strawberry soft drink.

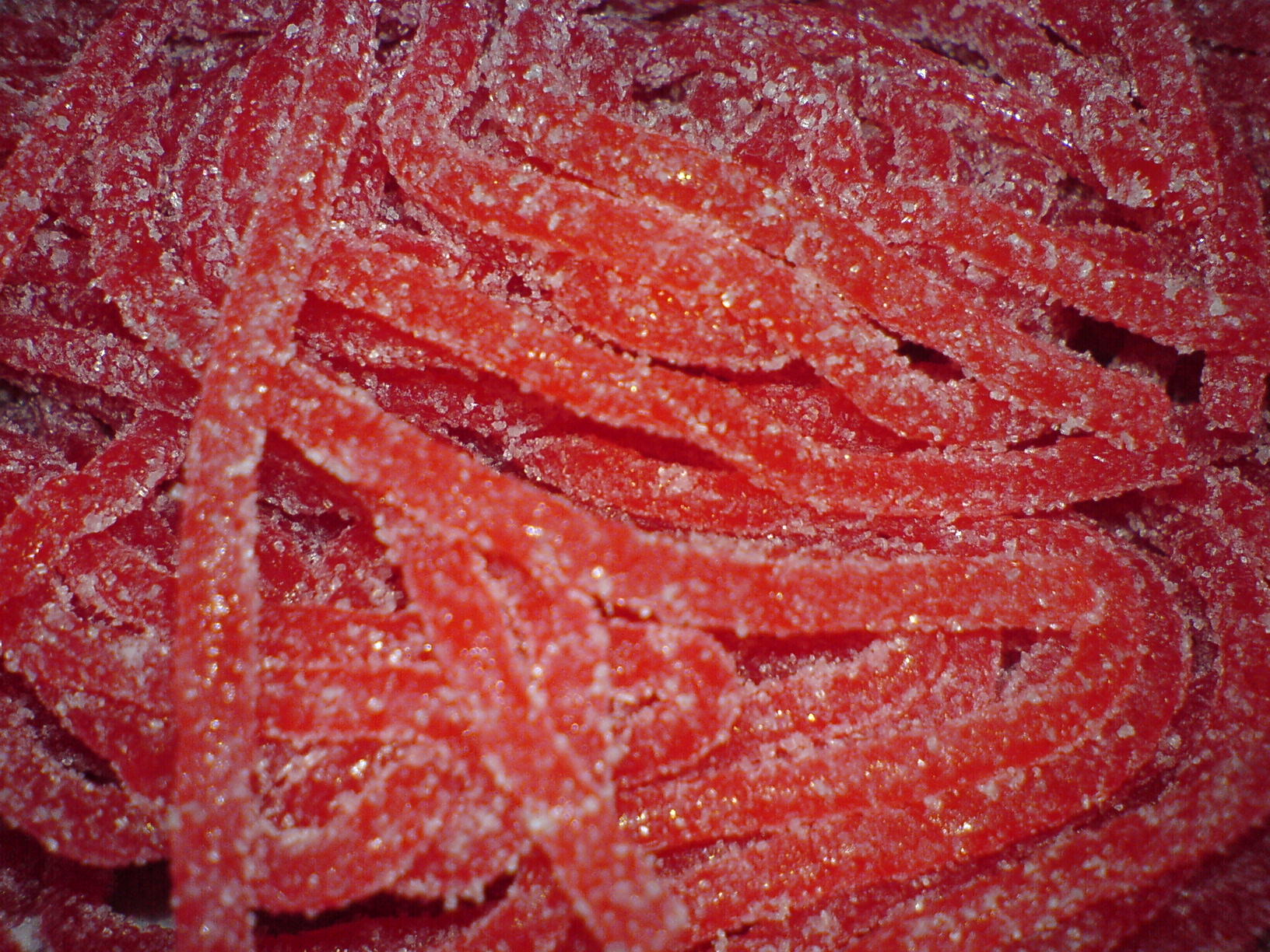
Allura Red AC in confectionery

Allura Red has been heavily studied by food safety groups in North America and Europe, and remains in wide use. However, chronic exposure to the dye has been shown to increase susceptibility to bowel disorders in mice. The dye has also been shown to damage the DNA of and cause colonic inflammation in mice.

The UK's Food Standards Agency commissioned a study of six food dyes, dubbed the "Southampton 6" (tartrazine, Allura Red, Ponceau 4R, Quinoline Yellow, sunset yellow, carmoisine), and sodium benzoate (a preservative) on children in the general population, who consumed them in beverages. The study found "a possible link between the consumption of these artificial colours and a sodium benzoate preservative and increased hyperactivity" in the children; the advisory committee to the FSA that evaluated the study also determined that because of study limitations, the results could not be extrapolated to the general population, and further testing was recommended.

The European Food Safety Authority (EFSA), with a stronger emphasis on the precautionary principle (requiring proof that a substance is safe before allowing it in food), required labelling and temporarily reduced the acceptable daily intake (ADI) for the food colorings; the UK FSA called for voluntary withdrawal of the colorings by food manufacturers. However, in 2009, the EFSA re-evaluated the data at hand and determined that "the available scientific evidence does not substantiate a link between the color additives and behavioral effects", and in 2014, after further review of the data, the EFSA restored the prior ADI levels. In 2015, the EFSA found that the exposure estimates did not exceed the ADI of 7 mg/kg per day in any population. However, the EU now requires that all products containing synthetic food dyes display a label reading "may have an adverse effect on activity and attention in children".

In contrast, the US GRAS policy does not include color additives and must be dealt with separately. The US FDA did not make changes following the publication of the Southampton study. Following a citizen petition filed by the Center for Science in the Public Interest in 2008, requesting the FDA ban several food additives, the FDA commenced a review of the available evidence but found no evidence to justify changes.

Allura Red AC has previously been banned in Denmark, Belgium, France, Germany, Austria, Switzerland, and Sweden. This changed in 2008, when the EU adopted a common framework for authorizing food additives, under which Allura Red AC is not currently banned. In Norway and Iceland, it was banned between 1978 and 2001, a period in which azo dyes were only legally used in alcoholic beverages and some fish products.

In September 2024, California banned the inclusion of Allura Red AC, along with five other artificial dyes, in food served in the state's public schools.

In April 2025, the US FDA announced a plan to encourage companies to voluntarily phase out Allura Red AC along with other petroleum-based dyes by the end of the year as part of Robert F. Kennedy Jr.'s Make America Healthy Again initiative. The FDA has compiled a spreadsheet of companies who have pledged to remove petroleum based dyes from their products.
