= Acid orange 20 =

Names
- IUPAC name Sodium 4-[2-(4-oxonaphthalen-1-ylidene)hydrazin-1-yl]benzenesulfonate
- Other names Orange I, 4-[(4-hydroxy-1-naphthalenyl)azo]benzenesulfonic acid, monosodium salt sodium 4-[(4-hydroxy-1-naphthalenyl)azo]benzenesulfonate

Identifiers
CAS Number	523-44-4 (E)
3D model (JSmol)	Interactive image
Beilstein Reference	3826844
ChEBI	CHEBI:82426
ChemSpider	7844542 (E); 14466524 (Z)
ECHA InfoCard	100.007.589
EC Number	208-346-6
PubChem CID	135513128 (E); 23721617 (Z)
RTECS number	DB7085000
UNII	W9Q9OB858O (E)
CompTox Dashboard (EPA)	DTXSID50883421
- InChI: InChI=1S/C16H12N2O4S.Na/c19-16-10-9-15(13-3-1-2-4-14(13)16)18-17-11-5-7-12(8-6-11)23(20,21)22;/h1-10,17H,(H,20,21,22);/q;+1/p-1 Key: HMWJVUNISIEXFR-UHFFFAOYSA-M
- SMILES: [Na+].[O-]S(=O)(=O)C1=CC=C(NN=C2C=CC(=O)C3=C2C=CC=C3)C=C1

Properties
Chemical formula	C_{16}H_{11}N_{2}NaO_{4}S
Molar mass	350.32 g·mol^{−1}

Hazards
NFPA 704 (fire diamond)	0 0 0
- Except where otherwise noted, data are given for materials in their standard state (at 25 °C [77 °F], 100 kPa). Infobox references

Acid orange 20 (also Orange I) is an organic compound and an azo dye. It is one of the first water soluble dyes to be commercialized, and one of seven original food dyes allowed under the U.S. Pure Food and Drug Act of June 30, 1906. It is analyzed by HPLC.

== Use and discontinuation ==
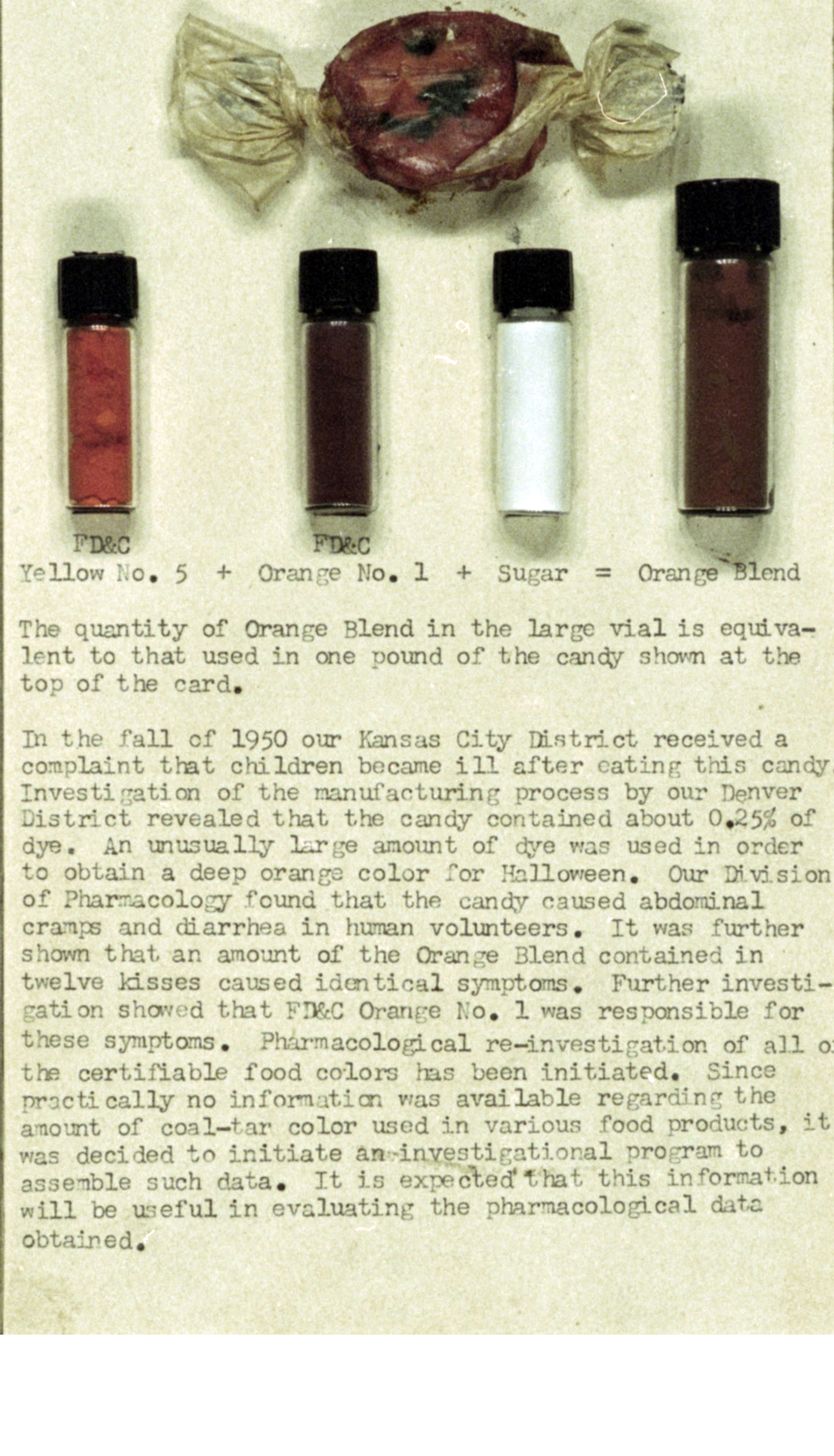
FDA explanation of Orange Number 1

At one time it was a popular food colorant but it was delisted in 1959 in the U.S.

In the early 1950s, after several cases were reported of sickness in children who had eaten Halloween candy colored with the dye, the FDA conducted new, more thorough and rigorous testing on food dyes. Orange 1 was outlawed for food use in 1956.

In [late] 1950[,] our Kansas City District received a complaint that children became ill after eating this candy. Investigation of the manufacturing process by our Denver District revealed that the candy contained about 0.25% of dye [FD&C Orange No. 1 and FD&C Yellow No. 5, "Orange Blend"]. An unusually large amount of dye was used in order to obtain a deep orange color for Halloween. Our Division of Pharmacology found that the candy caused abdominal cramps and diarrhea in human volunteers. It was further shown that an amount of the Orange Blend contained in twelve kisses caused identical symptoms. Pharmacological re-investigation of all the certifiable food colors has been initiated. Since practically no information was available regarding the amount of coal-tar color used in various food products, it was decided to initiate an investigational program to assemble such data. It is expected that this information will be useful in evaluating the pharmacological data obtained.

— Food and Drug Administration

== Chemical structure ==
structure of tautomers of acid orange 20

Although acid orange 20 is often drawn as an azo compound (with C-N=N-C linkage), it mainly exists as a tautomer with a hydrazone (C=N-NH-C) group.

== Related compounds ==
- Orange II (Acid Orange 7), an isomer
