= Ponceau 6R =

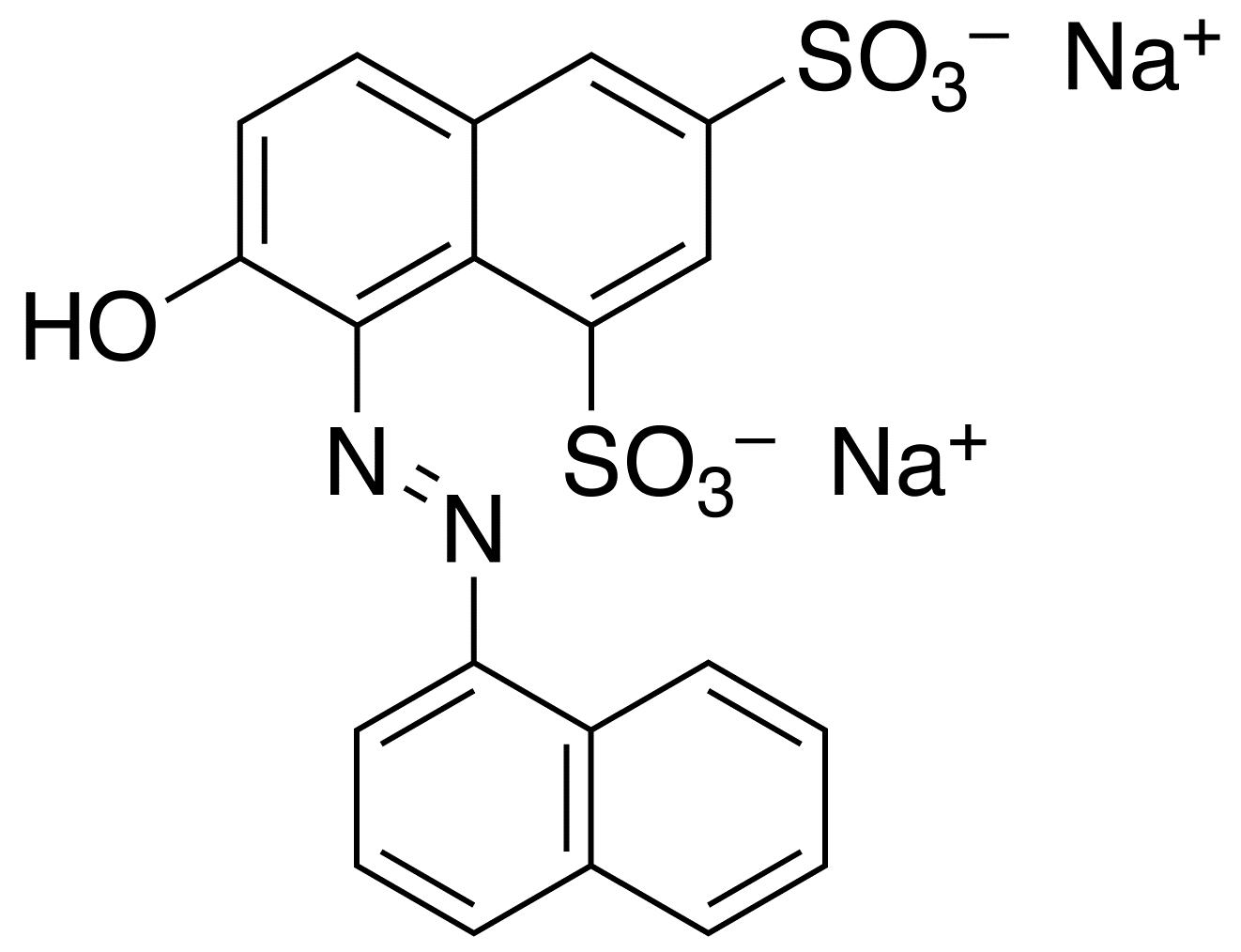

Names
- Other names: Ponceau 6R

Identifiers
CAS Number	2766-77-0
3D model (JSmol)	Interactive image
ChEMBL	ChEMBL368082
ChemSpider	16736230
ECHA InfoCard	100.018.584
EC Number	220-441-4
E number	E126 (colours)
PubChem CID	165025
UNII	W8UOR0932R
- InChI: InChI=1S/C20H14N2O7S2.2Na/c23-17-9-8-13-10-14(30(24,25)26)11-18(31(27,28)29)19(13)20(17)22-21-16-7-3-5-12-4-1-2-6-15(12)16;;/h1-11,23H,(H,24,25,26)(H,27,28,29);;/q;2*+1/p-2 Key: FUGCXLNGEHFIOA-UHFFFAOYSA-L
- SMILES: [Na+].[Na+].[Na+].[Na+].Oc1cc(c2ccccc2c1N=Nc3c(O)c(cc4cc(cc(c34)S(=O)(=O)[O-])S(=O)(=O)[O-])S(=O)(=O)[O-])S(=O)(=O)[O-]

Properties
Chemical formula	C_{20}H_{12}N_{2}Na_{2}O_{7}S_{2}
Molar mass	502.42 g·mol^{−1}
- Except where otherwise noted, data are given for materials in their standard state (at 25 °C [77 °F], 100 kPa). Infobox references

Ponceau 6R, or Crystal ponceau 6R, Crystal scarlet, Brilliant crystal scarlet 6R, Acid Red 44, or C.I. 16250, is a red azo dye. It is soluble in water and slightly soluble in ethanol. It was used as a food dye, formerly having E number E126, but was banned in Europe in 1978. It is also used in histology, for staining fibrin with the MSB Trichrome stain. It usually comes as disodium salt.

Amaranth is a closely related azo dye, also usable in trichrome staining.
