= Ponceau 3R =

Names
- Other names C.I. Food Red 6

Identifiers
CAS Number	3564-09-8
3D model (JSmol)	Interactive image
ChemSpider	16739478
ECHA InfoCard	100.020.580
EC Number	222-638-0
PubChem CID	19095
RTECS number	QJ6650000
UNII	FA32R9S74X
CompTox Dashboard (EPA)	DTXSID7021231
- InChI: InChI=1S/C19H18N2O7S2.2Na/c1-10-6-12(3)16(7-11(10)2)20-21-18-15-5-4-14(29(23,24)25)8-13(15)9-17(19(18)22)30(26,27)28;;/h4-9,22H,1-3H3,(H,23,24,25)(H,26,27,28);;/q;2*+1/p-2 Key: SWPPXVFKWWEYSV-UHFFFAOYSA-L
- SMILES: CC1=CC(=C(C=C1C)N=NC2=C3C=CC(=CC3=CC(=C2O)S(=O)(=O)[O-])S(=O)(=O)[O-])C.[Na+].[Na+]

Properties
Chemical formula	C_{19}H_{16}N_{2}Na_{2}O_{7}S_{2}
Molar mass	494.44 g·mol^{−1}

Hazards
- GHS labelling
Pictograms	(GHS07: Exclamation mark) (GHS08: Health hazard)
Signal word	Warning
Hazard statements	H302, H315, H319, H335, H351
Precautionary statements	P201, P202, P261, P264, P270, P271, P280, P281, P301+P312, P302+P352, P304+P340, P305+P351+P338, P308+P313, P312, P321, P330, P332+P313, P337+P313, P362, P403+P233, P405, P501
- Except where otherwise noted, data are given for materials in their standard state (at 25 °C [77 °F], 100 kPa). Infobox references

Ponceau 3R (C.I. 16155) is an azo dye that once was used as a red food colorant. It is one of a family of Ponceau (French for "poppy-colored") dyes.
