= Cresidinesulfonic acid =

Names
- Preferred IUPAC name 4-Amino-5-methoxy-2-methylbenzene-1-sulfonic acid

Identifiers
CAS Number	6471-78-9
3D model (JSmol)	Interactive image
ChemSpider	73051
ECHA InfoCard	100.026.654
PubChem CID	80961
UNII	308K033X64
CompTox Dashboard (EPA)	DTXSID2027628
- InChI: InChI=1S/C8H11NO4S/c1-5-3-6(9)7(13-2)4-8(5)14(10,11)12/h3-4H,9H2,1-2H3,(H,10,11,12) Key: JBAVAJIXZVRJHT-UHFFFAOYSA-N; InChI=1/C8H11NO4S/c1-5-3-6(9)7(13-2)4-8(5)14(10,11)12/h3-4H,9H2,1-2H3,(H,10,11,12) Key: JBAVAJIXZVRJHT-UHFFFAOYAO
- SMILES: Cc1cc(c(cc1S(=O)(=O)O)OC)N

Properties
Chemical formula	C_{8}H_{11}NO_{4}S
Molar mass	217.24 g·mol^{−1}
- Except where otherwise noted, data are given for materials in their standard state (at 25 °C [77 °F], 100 kPa). Infobox references

p-Cresidinesulfonic acid (4-amino-5-methoxy-2-methylbenzenesulfonic acid) is used to make specialty dyes for food products. It is a synthetic organic chemical derived from toluidine that the United States imports from China, India, and Japan.

== External sources ==
- United States International Trade Commission
- chemicalregister.com
