= Azorubine =

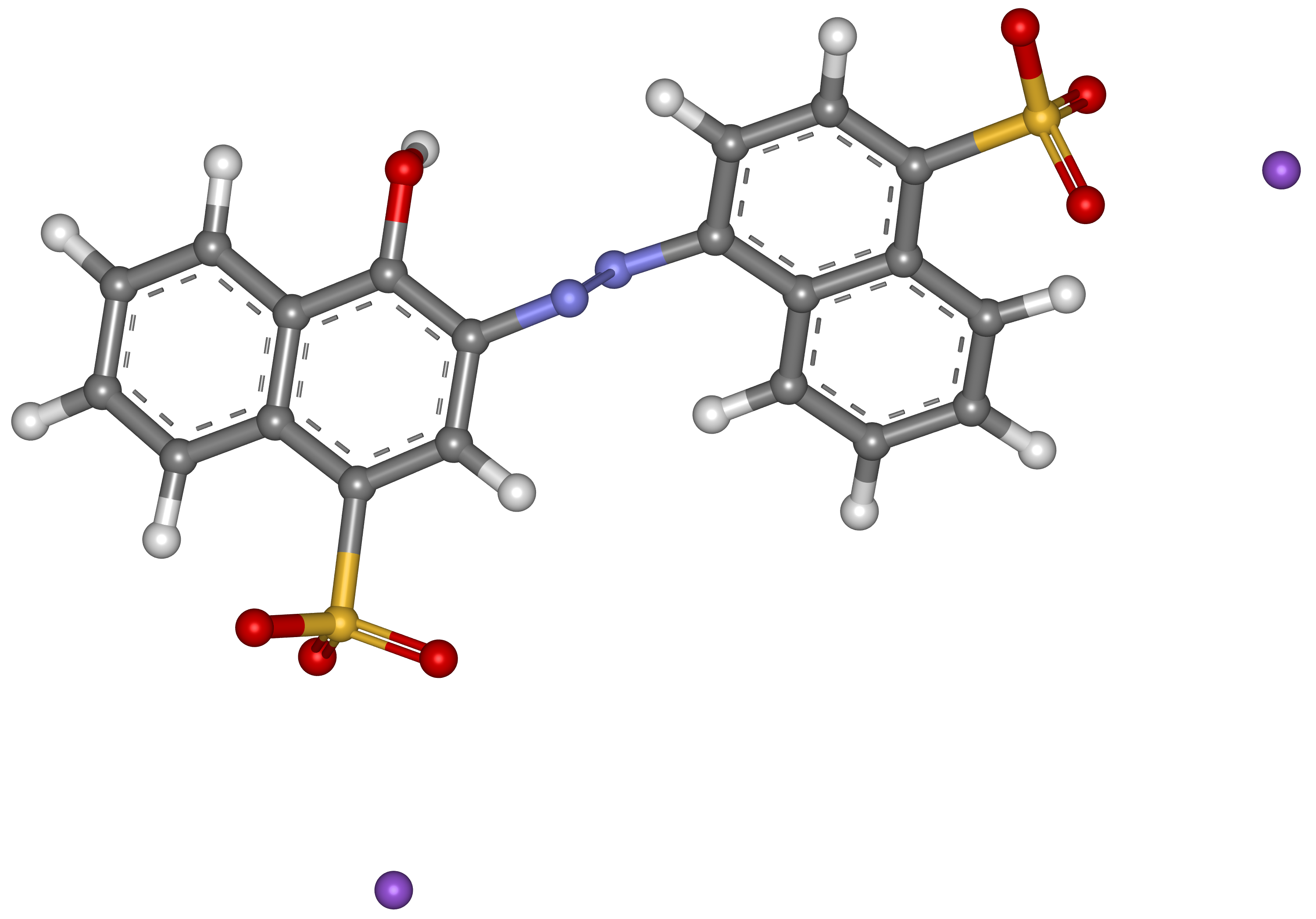

Names
- IUPAC name disodium 4-hydroxy-3-[(E)-(4-sulfonato-1-naphthyl)diazenyl]naphthalene-1-sulfonate
- Other names: carmoisine; Food Red 3; Azorubin S; Brillantcarmoisin O; Acid Red 14; C.I. 14720; E122

Identifiers
CAS Number	3567-69-9
3D model (JSmol)	Interactive image
ChEMBL	ChEMBL1552837; ChEMBL1624506
ChemSpider	11588225
ECHA InfoCard	100.020.598
EC Number	217-699-5
E number	E122 (colours)
KEGG	C19358
PubChem CID	19118
UNII	DR4641L47F
CompTox Dashboard (EPA)	DTXSID3021225
- InChI: InChI=1S/C20H14N2O7S2.2Na/c23-20-15-8-4-3-7-14(15)19(31(27,28)29)11-17(20)22-21-16-9-10-18(30(24,25)26)13-6-2-1-5-12(13)16;;/h1-11,23H,(H,24,25,26)(H,27,28,29);;/q;2*+1/p-2/b22-21+;; Key: YSVBPNGJESBVRM-ZPZFBZIMSA-L; InChI=1/C20H14N2O7S2.2Na/c23-20-15-8-4-3-7-14(15)19(31(27,28)29)11-17(20)22-21-16-9-10-18(30(24,25)26)13-6-2-1-5-12(13)16;;/h1-11,23H,(H,24,25,26)(H,27,28,29);;/q;2*+1/p-2/b22-21+;; Key: YSVBPNGJESBVRM-DGPRXMBVBS
- SMILES: c1ccc2c(c1)c(ccc2S(=O)(=O)[O-])/N=N/c3cc(c4ccccc4c3O)S(=O)(=O)[O-].[Na+].[Na+]

Properties
Chemical formula	C_{20}H_{12}N_{2}Na_{2}O_{7}S_{2}
Molar mass	502.44
Appearance	red powder
Melting point	>300 °C (572 °F)
Solubility in water	Soluble (120g/L)
- Except where otherwise noted, data are given for materials in their standard state (at 25 °C [77 °F], 100 kPa). verify (what is ?) Infobox references

Azorubine, also known as carmoisine, is an azo dye consisting of two naphthalene subunits. It is a red solid. It is mainly used in foods that are heat-treated after fermentation. It has E number E122.

== Uses ==
In the US, this color was listed in 1939 as Ext. D&C Red No. 10 for use in externally applied drugs and cosmetics. It was delisted in 1963 because no party was interested in supporting the studies needed to establish safety. It was not used in food in the US.

In the EU, azorubine is known as E number E122, and is authorized for use in certain foods and beverages, such as cheeses, dried fruit, and some alcoholic beverages, and is permitted for use as an excipient in medications.

There are no provisions for azorubine in the Codex Alimentarius.

== Safety ==
The Joint FAO/WHO Expert Committee on Food Additives (JECFA) established an acceptable daily intake (ADI) for azorubine of 0–4 mg/kg of body weight per day in 1983. In 2009, the European Food Safety Authority (EFSA) re-evaluated azorubine and retained the 4 mg/kg ADI, concluding that the available data showed no concern regarding genotoxicity and that evidence was insufficient to establish that azorubine directly induces sensitivity reactions.

Azorubine is one of the "Southampton Six", a group of six synthetic food colors that also includes tartrazine (E102), quinoline yellow (E104), sunset yellow (E110), Ponceau 4R (E124), and Allura red (E129). In a 2007 study by researchers at the University of Southampton, the colors were tested across two distinct mixtures containing sodium benzoate; azorubine was one of two colors included in both trial mixtures. EFSA reviewed the trial in 2008 and concluded that it provided limited evidence of a small effect of the tested mixtures on activity and attention in some children, but that the trial design could not identify which individual additives were responsible.

Under Article 24 and Annex V of Regulation (EC) No 1333/2008, foods sold in the European Union containing azorubine must carry the color's name or E number accompanied by the warning statement that it "may have an adverse effect on activity and attention in children".
