= Amaranth (dye) =

Chemical compound

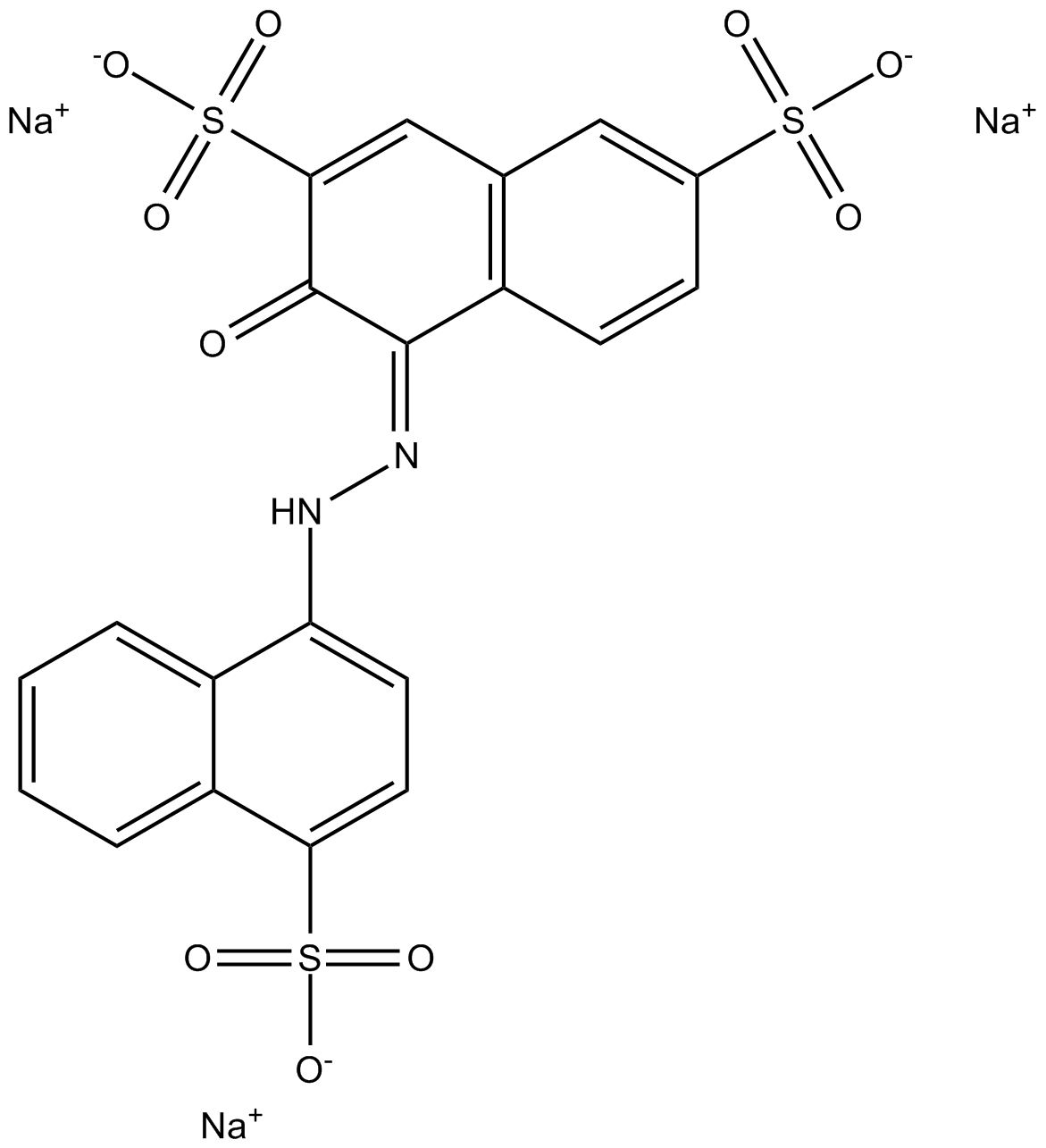

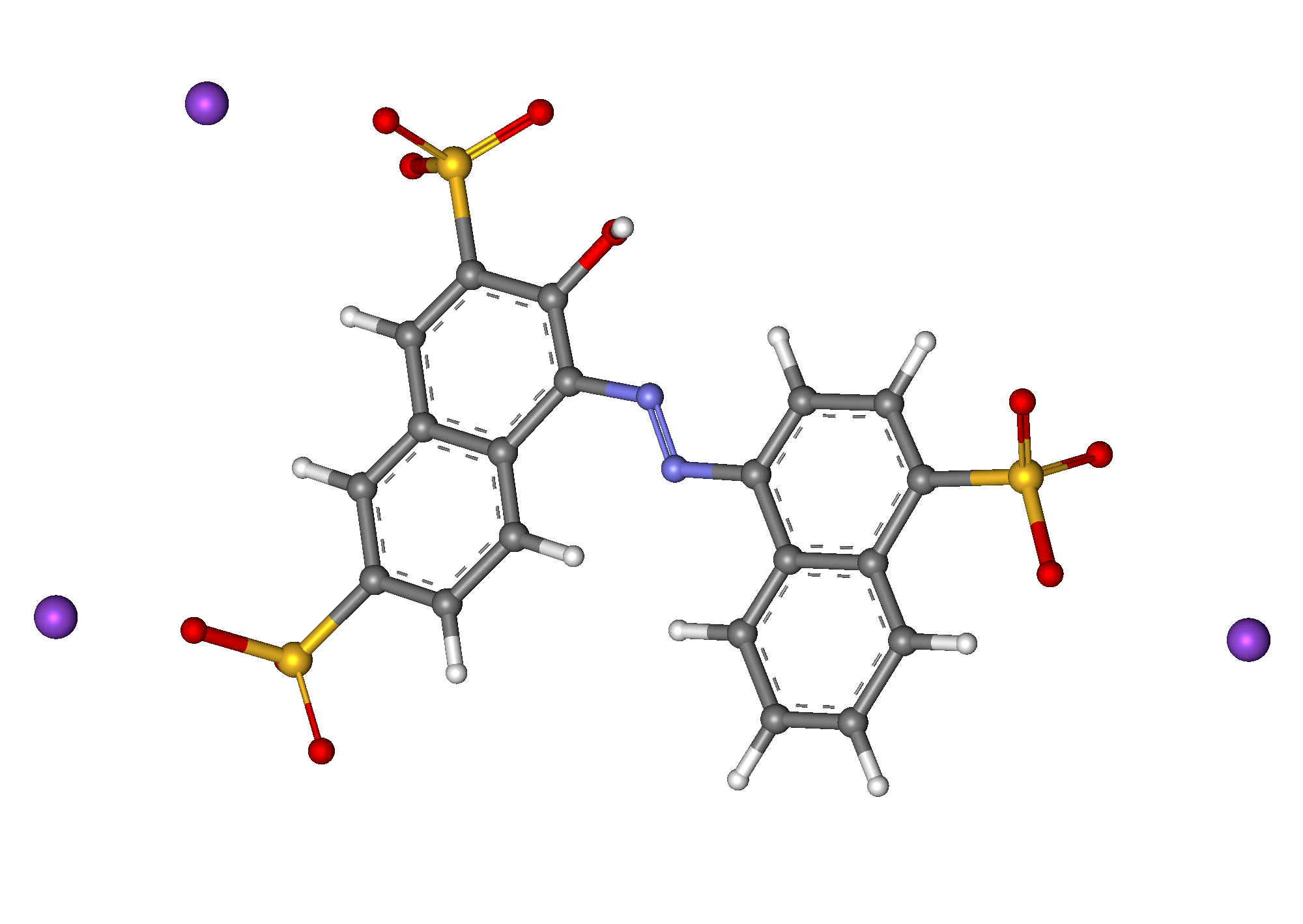

Names
- IUPAC name Trisodium (4E)-3-oxo-4-[(4-sulfonate-1-naphthyl)hydrazono]naphthalene-2,7-disulfonate
- Other names: FD&C Red No. 2; E123; C.I. Food Red 9; Acid Red 27; Azorubin S; C.I. 16185

Identifiers
CAS Number	915-67-3
3D model (JSmol)	Interactive image
ChEBI	CHEBI:34533
ChEMBL	ChEMBL2104005
ChemSpider	21169821
ECHA InfoCard	100.011.839
EC Number	213-022-2
E number	E123 (colours)
KEGG	C14760
PubChem CID	13506
UNII	37RBV3X49K
CompTox Dashboard (EPA)	DTXSID2021232
- InChI: InChI=1S/C20H14N2O10S3.3Na/c23-20-18(35(30,31)32)10-11-9-12(33(24,25)26)5-6-13(11)19(20)22-21-16-7-8-17(34(27,28)29)15-4-2-1-3-14(15)16;;;/h1-10,23H,(H,24,25,26)(H,27,28,29)(H,30,31,32);;;/q;3*+1/p-3 Key: WLDHEUZGFKACJH-UHFFFAOYSA-K; InChI=1/C20H14N2O10S3.3Na/c23-20-18(35(30,31)32)10-11-9-12(33(24,25)26)5-6-13(11)19(20)22-21-16-7-8-17(34(27,28)29)15-4-2-1-3-14(15)16;;;/h1-10,23H,(H,24,25,26)(H,27,28,29)(H,30,31,32);;;/q;3*+1/p-3 Key: WLDHEUZGFKACJH-DFZHHIFOAW
- SMILES: [Na+].[Na+].[Na+].[O-]S(=O)(=O)c4ccc(N=Nc1c2ccc(cc2cc(c1O)S([O-])(=O)=O)S([O-])(=O)=O)c3ccccc34

Properties
Chemical formula	C_{20}H_{11}N_{2}Na_{3}O_{10}S_{3}
Molar mass	604.47305
Appearance	Dark red solid
Melting point	120 °C (248 °F; 393 K) (decomposes)

Hazards
- GHS labelling
Pictograms	(GHS07: Exclamation mark)
Signal word	Warning
Hazard statements	H315, H319, H335
Precautionary statements	P261, P264, P271, P280, P302+P352, P304+P340, P305+P351+P338, P312, P321, P332+P313, P337+P313, P362, P403+P233, P405, P501
- Except where otherwise noted, data are given for materials in their standard state (at 25 °C [77 °F], 100 kPa). verify (what is ?) Infobox references

Amaranth, FD&C Red No. 2, E123, C.I. Food Red 9, Acid Red 27, Azorubin S, or C.I. 16185 is a modified red azo dye used as a food dye and to color cosmetics. Although it is not from the Amaranth flower and being a 100% artificial color, the name was taken from amaranth grain, a plant distinguished by its red color and edible protein-rich seeds.

Amaranth is an anionic dye. It can be applied to natural and synthetic fibers, leather, paper, and phenol-formaldehyde resins. As a food additive it has E number E123. Amaranth usually comes as a trisodium salt. It has the appearance of reddish-brown, dark red to purple water-soluble powder that decomposes at 120 °C without melting. Its water solution has an absorption maximum of about 520 nm. Like all azo dyes, Amaranth was, during the middle of the 20th century, made from coal tar; modern synthetics are more likely to be made from petroleum byproducts.

Since 1976, amaranth dye has been banned in the United States by the Food and Drug Administration (FDA) as a suspected carcinogen. Its use is still used in certain foods in the European Union and UK.

== History and health effects ==
After an incident in the 1950s involving Orange 1 in Clover brand "Spooky Lozenges" and other orange and red candies manufactured at that time, the FDA retested food colors. Later, in 1960, the FDA was given jurisdiction over color additives, limiting the amounts that could be added to foods and requiring producers of food color to ensure the safety and proper labeling of colors. Permission to use food additives was given on a provisional basis, which could be withdrawn should safety issues arise. The FDA gave "generally recognized as safe" (GRAS) provisional status to substances already in use, and extended Red No. 2's provisional status 14 times.

In 1971, a Soviet study linked the dye to cancer. By 1976, over 1,000,000 pounds (450,000 kg) of the dye worth $5 million was used as a colorant in $10 billion worth of foods, drugs and cosmetics. Consumer activists in the United States, perturbed by what they perceived as collusion between the FDA and food conglomerates, put pressure on the FDA to ban it. FDA Commissioner Alexander M. Schmidt defended the agency's stance, as he had earlier defended the FDA against collusion accusations in his 1975 book, stating that the FDA found "no evidence of a public health hazard". However, testing by the FDA found a statistically significant increase in the incidence of malignant tumors in female rats given a high dosage of the dye, as well as an increase in cholecystitis, and concluded that since there could also no longer be a presumption of safety, that use of the dye should be discontinued. The FDA banned FD&C Red No. 2 in 1976. FD&C Red No. 40 (Allura Red AC) replaced the banned Red No. 2, as its toxicity was determined to be significantly lower due to the removal of one sodium sulfonate functional group, among other molecular adjustments to furthermore reduce the immediate toxicity of the specific azo dye upon consumption.

== See also ==
- Allura Red AC (FD&C Red 40)
- Amaranth (color)
- Azorubine
- Federal Food, Drug, and Cosmetic Act of 1938
