= Ponceau 4R =

- Ponceau 4R

Names
- IUPAC name Trisodium (8Z)-7-hidroxi-8-[(4-sulfonatonaphthalen-1-yl)hydrazinylidene]naphthalene-1,3-disulfonate

Identifiers
CAS Number	2611-82-7
3D model (JSmol)	Interactive image
ChemSpider	11232342
ECHA InfoCard	100.018.216
E number	E124 (colours)
PubChem CID	9570119
UNII	Z525CBK9PG
CompTox Dashboard (EPA)	DTXSID9021213
- InChI: InChI=1S/C20H14N2O10S3.3Na/c23-16-7-5-11-9-12(33(24,25)26)10-18(35(30,31)32)19(11)20(16)22-21-15-6-8-17(34(27,28)29)14-4-2-1-3-13(14)15;;;/h1-10,23H,(H,24,25,26)(H,27,28,29)(H,30,31,32);;;/q;3*+1/p-3/b22-21+;;; Key: SWGJCIMEBVHMTA-ZRUFZDNISA-K; InChI=1/C20H14N2O10S3.3Na/c23-16-7-5-11-9-12(33(24,25)26)10-18(35(30,31)32)19(11)20(16)22-21-15-6-8-17(34(27,28)29)14-4-2-1-3-13(14)15;;;/h1-10,23H,(H,24,25,26)(H,27,28,29)(H,30,31,32);;;/q;3*+1/p-3/b22-21+;;; Key: SWGJCIMEBVHMTA-QWKJSYRZBY
- SMILES: [Na+].[Na+].[Na+].[O-]S(=O)(=O)c4ccc(c3ccccc34)/N=N/c1c2c(ccc1O)cc(S(=O)(=O)[O-])cc2S(=O)(=O)[O-]

Properties
Chemical formula	C_{20}H_{11}N_{2}Na_{3}O_{10}S_{3}
Molar mass	604.46 g·mol^{−1}

Hazards
NFPA 704 (fire diamond)	1 1 0
- Except where otherwise noted, data are given for materials in their standard state (at 25 °C [77 °F], 100 kPa). verify (what is ?) Infobox references

Ponceau 4R (known by more than 100 synonyms, including as C.I. 16255, cochineal red A, C.I. acid red 18, brilliant scarlet 3R, brilliant scarlet 4R, new coccine,) is a synthetic colourant that may be used as a food colouring. It is denoted by E Number E124. Its chemical name is 1-(4-sulfo-1-napthylazo)-2-napthol-6,8-disulfonic acid, trisodium salt. Ponceau (17th century French for "poppy-coloured") is the generic name for a family of azo dyes.

Ponceau 4R is a strawberry red azo dye which can be used in a variety of food products, and is usually synthesized from aromatic hydrocarbons; it is stable to light, heat, and acid but fades in the presence of ascorbic acid.

It is used in Europe, Asia, and Australia, but has not been approved for human consumption by the United States Food and Drug Administration.

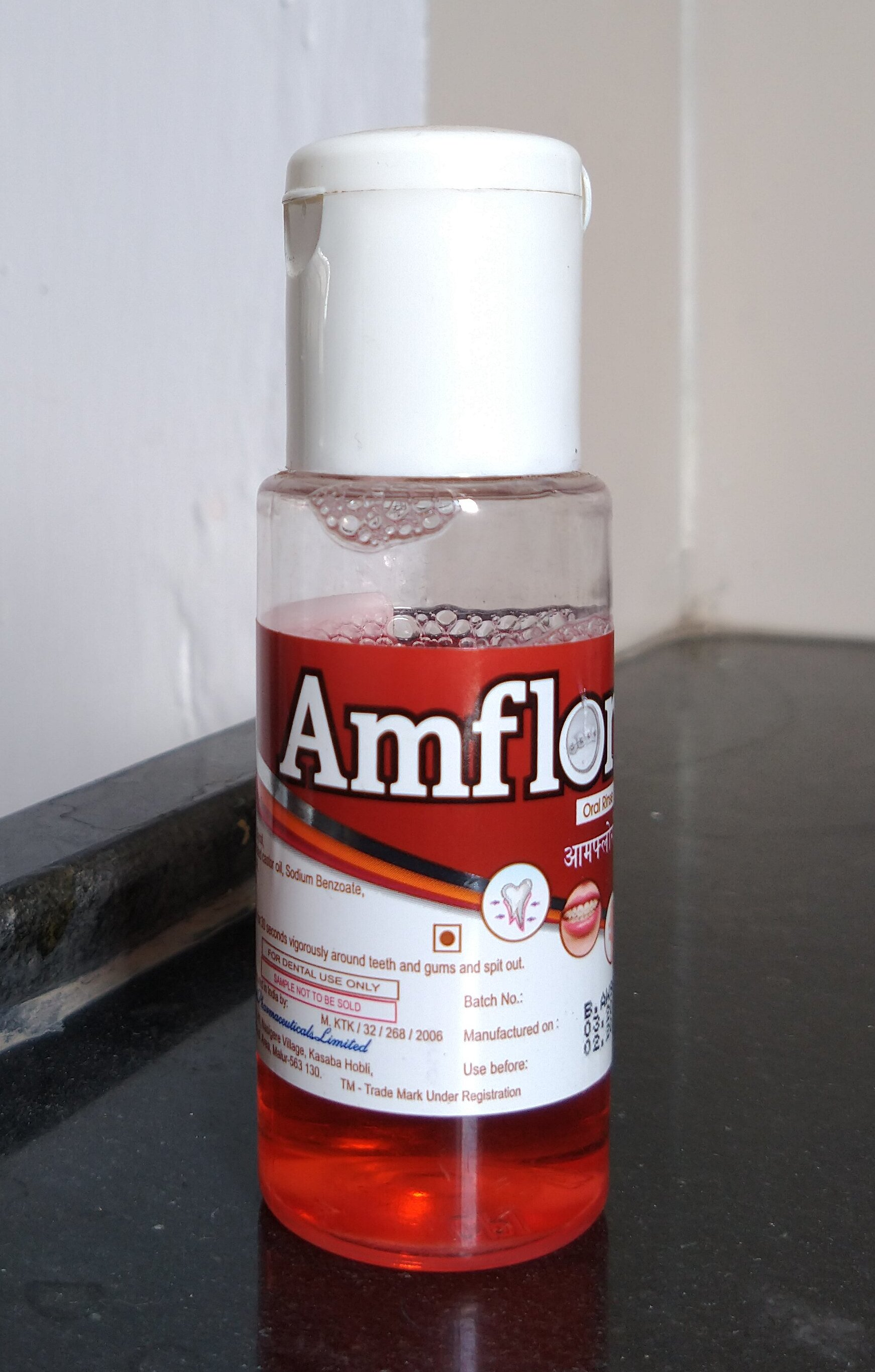
Amine fluoride mouthwash. Red colour is due to added ponceau 4R.

== Health effects ==
There is no evidence of carcinogenicity, genotoxicity, neurotoxicity, or reproductive and developmental toxicity at the permitted dietary exposures; the European acceptable daily intake (ADI) is 0.7 mg/kg and the WHO/FAO ADI is 4 mg/kg.

The production process may result in unsulfonated aromatic amines present in concentrations of up to 100 mg/kg which may be linked to cancer. The lake pigment form of the colour additive can also increase the intake of aluminium beyond the tolerable weekly intake (TWI) of 1 mg/kg/week. Therefore, the limit for aluminium may be adjusted to accommodate for this.

=== Possible cause of hyperactivity ===
Since the 1970s and the well-publicized advocacy of Benjamin Feingold, there has been public concern that food colourings may cause ADHD-like behavior in children. These concerns have led the FDA and other food safety authorities to regularly review the scientific literature, and led the UK FSA to commission a study by researchers at Southampton University of the effect of a mixture of six food dyes (tartrazine, Allura Red AC, ponceau 4R, Quinoline Yellow WS, sunset yellow and carmoisine, dubbed the "Southampton 6") and sodium benzoate (a preservative) on children in the general population, who consumed them in beverages; the study published in 2007. The study found "a possible link between the consumption of these artificial colours and a sodium benzoate preservative and increased hyperactivity" in the children; the advisory committee to the FSA that evaluated the study also determined that because of study limitations, the results could not be extrapolated to the general population, and further testing was recommended.

The European regulatory community, with a stronger emphasis on the precautionary principle, required labelling and temporarily reduced the acceptable daily intake (ADI) for the food colourings; the UK FSA called for voluntary withdrawal of the colourings by food manufacturers. However, in 2009 the EFSA re-evaluated the data at hand and determined that "the available scientific evidence does not substantiate a link between the colour additives and behavioural effects".

There is no evidence to support broad claims that food colouring causes food intolerance and ADHD-like behaviour in children. It is possible that certain food colouring may act as a trigger in those who are genetically predisposed, but the evidence is weak.
