= Tartrazine =

Yellow food coloring

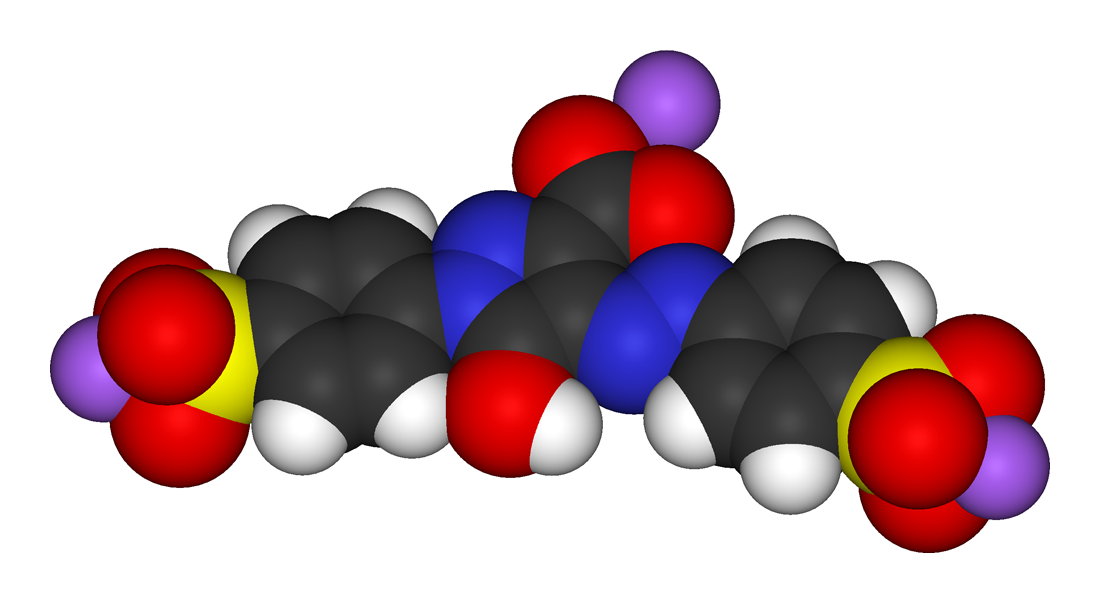

Names
- IUPAC name Trisodium 5-hydroxy-1-(4-sulfonatophenyl)-4-[(E)-(4-sulfonatophenyl)diazenyl]-1H-pyrazole-3-carboxylate
- Other names: FD&C Yellow 5

Identifiers
CAS Number	1934-21-0
3D model (JSmol)	Interactive image
ChemSpider	10606981
ECHA InfoCard	100.016.091
E number	E102 (colours)
PubChem CID	164825
UNII	I753WB2F1M
CompTox Dashboard (EPA)	DTXSID1021455
- InChI: InChI=1S/C16H12N4O9S2.3Na/c21-15-13(18-17-9-1-5-11(6-2-9)30(24,25)26)14(16(22)23)19-20(15)10-3-7-12(8-4-10)31(27,28)29;;;/h1-8,21H,(H,22,23)(H,24,25,26)(H,27,28,29);;;/q;3*+1/p-3/b18-17+;;; Key: YXHBBEQKMVAJOH-GLCFPVLVSA-K; InChI=1/C16H12N4O9S2.3Na/c21-15-13(18-17-9-1-5-11(6-2-9)30(24,25)26)14(16(22)23)19-20(15)10-3-7-12(8-4-10)31(27,28)29;;;/h1-8,21H,(H,22,23)(H,24,25,26)(H,27,28,29);;;/q;3*+1/p-3/b18-17+;;; Key: YXHBBEQKMVAJOH-KAGMCZNHBW
- SMILES: [Na+].[Na+].[Na+].[O-]S(=O)(=O)c1ccc(cc1)/N=N/c3c(nn(c2ccc(cc2)S([O-])(=O)=O)c3O)C([O-])=O

Properties
Chemical formula	C_{16}H_{9}N_{4}Na_{3}O_{9}S_{2}
Molar mass	534.36 g·mol^{−1}
Solubility in water	20 g/100 mL
Solubility	18 g/100 mL in glycerol, negligible in ethanol

Hazards
NFPA 704 (fire diamond)	2 1 0
- Except where otherwise noted, data are given for materials in their standard state (at 25 °C [77 °F], 100 kPa). verify (what is ?) Infobox references

Tartrazine is a synthetic lemon yellow azo dye primarily used as a food coloring. It is also known as E number E102, C.I. 19140, FD&C Yellow 5, Yellow 5 Lake, Acid Yellow 23, Food Yellow 4, and trisodium 1-(4-sulfonatophenyl)-4-(4-sulfonatophenylazo)-5-pyrazolone-3-carboxylate.

Tartrazine is a commonly used coloring agent all over the world, mainly for yellow, and can also be used with brilliant blue FCF (FD&C Blue 1, E133) or green S (E142) to produce various green shades. It serves as a dye for wool and silks, a colorant in food, drugs and cosmetics and an adsorption-elution indicator for chloride estimations in biochemistry.

== Production ==
Tartrazine is made by azo coupling of sulfanilic acid–based diazonium salts with a sulfonated pyrazolone derivative.

== History ==
Tartrazine was discovered in 1890 by Swiss chemist Johann Heinrich Ziegler, who developed the yellow azo dye in the laboratories of the Bindschedler'sche Fabrik für chemische Industrie in Basel (CIBA). This was patented and produced in Germany by BASF in 1885 (DRP 34294). The process was first presented in 1887 in Chemische Berichte, the journal of the German Chemical Society. Although the structure proposed by Ziegler was not confirmed, he was able to develop an alternative synthesis of tartrazine based on the idea that a hydrazone is the tautomeric form of an azo compound (azo-hydrazo tautomerism). This production process was patented in 1893 (British Patent 5693).

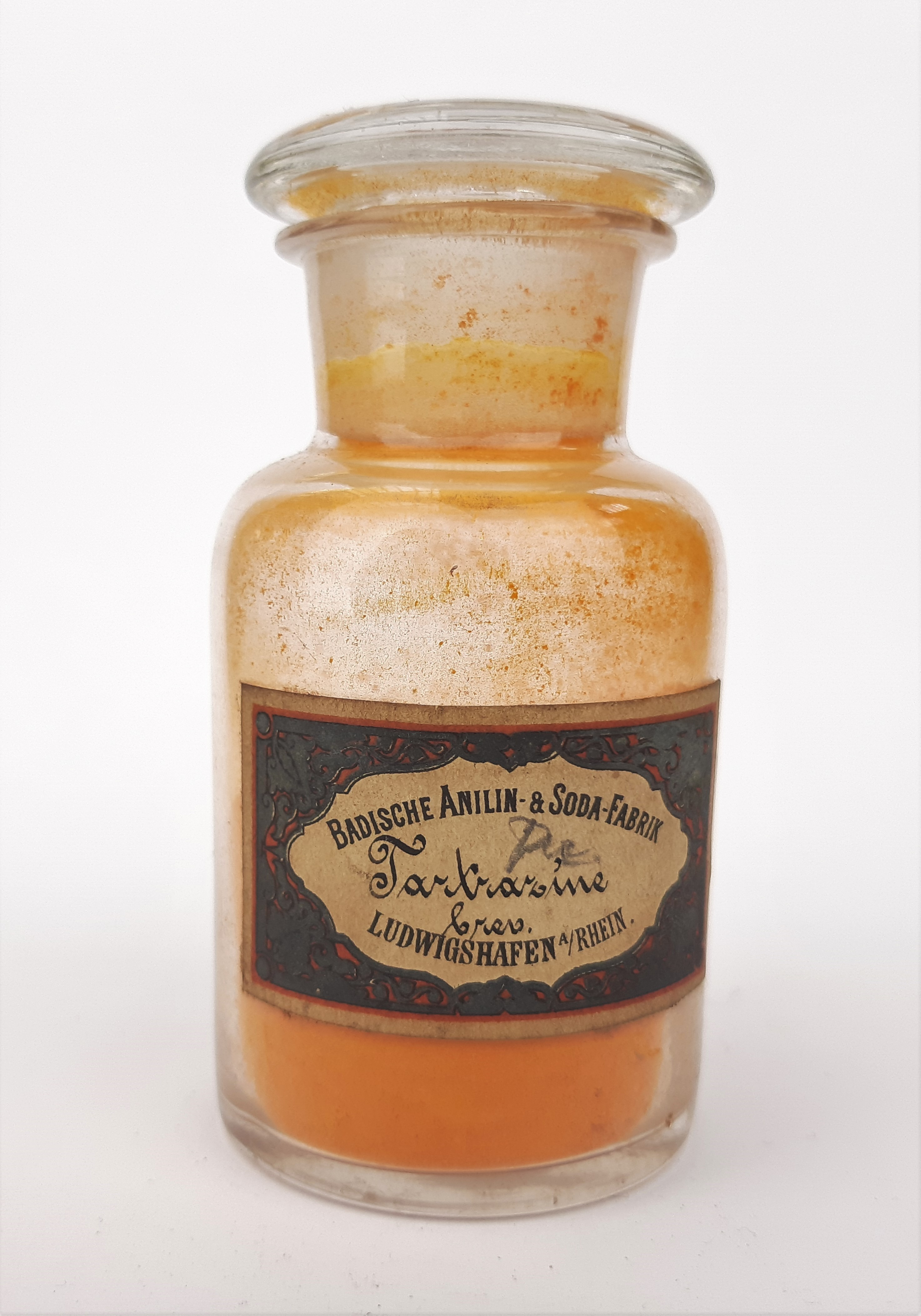
A bottle of tartrazine dye from the late 19th century.

== Products containing tartrazine ==
=== Foods ===
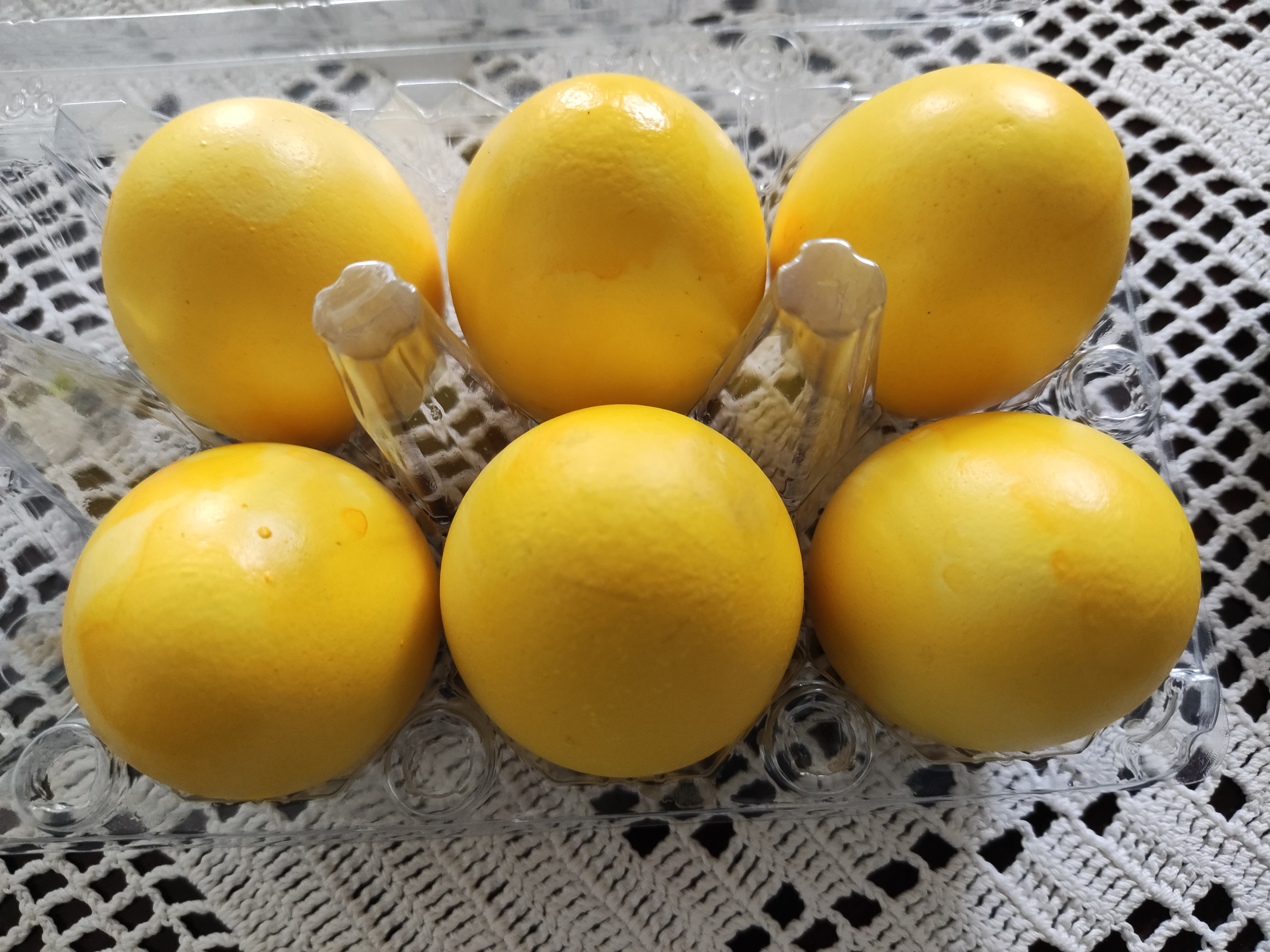
Easter eggs dyed with tartrazine

Many foods contain tartrazine in various proportions, depending on the manufacturer or person preparing the food. When in food, tartrazine is typically labelled as "color", "tartrazine", or "E102", depending on the jurisdiction, and the applicable labeling laws (see Regulation below).

Products containing tartrazine commonly include processed commercial foods that have an artificial yellow or green color, or that consumers expect to be brown or creamy looking. It has been frequently used in the bright yellow coloring of imitation lemon filling in baked goods. The following is a list of foods that may contain tartrazine:

- Desserts and confectionery: ice cream, ice pops and popsicles, confectionery and hard candy (such as gummy bears, marshmallows, etc.), cotton candy, instant puddings and gelatin, cake mixes, pastries, custard powder, marzipan, biscuits, and cookies.
- Beverages: soft drinks, energy and sports drinks, powdered drink mixes, fruit cordials, and flavored/mixed alcoholic beverages.
- Snacks: flavored corn chips (such as nachos, etc.), chewing gum, popcorn (both microwave and cinema-popped), and potato chips.
- Condiments and spreads: jam, jelly (including mint jelly), marmalade, mustard, horseradish, pickles (and other products containing pickles such as tartar sauce and dill pickle dip), and processed sauces.
- Other processed foods: cereal (such as corn flakes, muesli, etc.), instant or "cube" soups, rices (like paella, risotto, etc.), noodles, pureed fruit and pickled peppers, bright-green-colored seaweed salad.

=== Personal care and cosmetics products ===
A number of personal care and cosmetics products may contain tartrazine, usually labelled as CI 19140 or FD&C Yellow 5, including:

- Liquid and bar soaps, green hand sanitizer, moisturizers and lotions, mouth washes, perfumes, toothpastes, and shampoos, conditioners and other hair products.
- Cosmetics, such as eyeshadow, blush, face powder and foundation, lipstick, etc. – even those that are primarily pink or purple. (Usually make-up manufacturers use one label for all shades in a product line, placing the phrase "may contain" ahead of all colors that are used in that line, not necessarily that specific shade.)
- Nail polish, nail polish remover, temporary tattoos, and tanning lotions.

=== Medications ===
Various medications include tartrazine to give a yellow, orange or green hue to a liquid, capsule, pill, lotion, or gel, primarily for easy identification. Types of pharmaceutical products that may contain tartrazine include vitamins, antacids, cold medications (including cough drops and throat lozenges), lotions and prescription drugs.

Most, if not all, medication data sheets are required to contain a list of all ingredients, including tartrazine. Some include tartrazine in the allergens alert section.

The Canadian Compendium of Pharmaceuticals and Specialties (CPS), a prescribing reference book for health professionals, mentions tartrazine as a potential allergy for each drug that contains tartrazine.

=== Other products ===
Other products, such as household cleaning products, paper plates, pet foods, crayons, inks for writing instruments, stamp dyes, face paints, envelope glues, and deodorants, may also contain tartrazine.

== Chemistry ==
Tartrazine is water-soluble and has a maximum absorbance in an aqueous solution at 425 nm. It is one of the oldest known members of the pyrazolone family of dyes.

== Potential health effects on humans ==
=== Food intolerance, sensitivity, and allergies ===
The prevalence of tartrazine intolerance is estimated at 360,000 U.S. Citizens affected, less than 0.12% of the general population. According to the FDA, tartrazine causes hives in fewer than 1 in 10,000 people, or 0.01%.

It is not clear how many individuals are sensitive or intolerant to tartrazine, but the University of Guelph estimates that it is 1 to 10 out of every ten thousand people (0.01% to 0.1% of the population).

=== Asthma ===
Tartrazine has been suspected of exacerbating asthma, but medical evidence does not confirm this.

=== Food intolerance and ADHD-like behavior ===
Tartrazine is one of various food colors said to cause food intolerance and ADHD-like behavior in children. It is possible that certain food colorings may act as a trigger in those who are genetically predisposed, but the evidence for this effect is weak.

=== Reproductive ===
Rumors began circulating about tartrazine in the 1990s regarding a link to its consumption (specifically its use in Mountain Dew) and alleged adverse effects on male erectile function, testicle and penis size, and sperm count. The rumors likely began as the result of an in vitro study showing an effect on estrogen receptors; however, this effect was disproven in later in vivo studies. Tartrazine may have a reproductive effect at extremely high dosages, but it has no reproductive effect at the levels found in one food product.

== Regulation ==
=== North America ===
==== Canada ====
Tartrazine is listed as a permitted food coloring in Canada. The majority of pre-packaged foods are required to list all ingredients, including all food additives such as color; however section B.01.010 (3)(b) of the Regulations provide food manufacturers with the choice of declaring added color(s) by either their common name or simply as "colour".

The maximum permitted level of tartrazine is 300 ppm.

==== United States ====
The United States requires the presence of tartrazine to be declared on food and drug products (21 CFR 74.1705 (revised April 2013), 21 CFR 201.20) and also color batches to be preapproved by the United States Food and Drug Administration (FDA). As part of these regulations, the FDA requires that the Precautions section of prescription drug labels include the warning statement, "This product contains FD&C Yellow No. 5 (tartrazine) which may cause allergic-type reactions (including bronchial asthma) in certain susceptible persons. Although the overall incidence of FD&C Yellow No. 5 (tartrazine) sensitivity in the general population is low, it is frequently seen in patients who also have aspirin hypersensitivity."

The FDA regularly seizes products if found to be containing undeclared tartrazine, declared but not FDA-tested, or labeled something other than FD&C yellow 5 or Yellow 5. Such products seized often include noodles.

=== Europe ===
==== European Union ====
The European Food Safety Authority allows for tartrazine to be used in processed cheese, canned or bottled fruit or vegetables, processed fish or fishery products, and wines and wine-based drinks.

The European regulatory community required labelling and temporarily reduced the acceptable daily intake (ADI) for the food colorings; the UK FSA called for voluntary withdrawal of the colorings by food manufacturers. However, in 2009 the EFSA re-evaluated the data at hand and determined that "the available scientific evidence does not substantiate a link between the color additives and behavioral effects."

Tartrazine is among six artificial colors for which the European Union requires products that contain them to be marked with the statement May have an adverse effect on activity and attention in children.

==== Austria and Germany ====
Yellow tartrazine (E102) was banned in Austria and Germany, before European Parliament and Council Directive 94/36/EC lifted the ban.

==== Norway ====
Yellow tartrazine (E102) was also banned in Norway several years ago, but the ban was likewise lifted due to the implementation of EU directive 94/36/EC. (Norway is not an E.U. member state, but has signed up to follow most EU regulations via the EEA agreement.)

==== United Kingdom ====
In response to concerns about the safety of certain food additives, the UK FSA commissioned a study by researchers at Southampton University of the effect of a mixture of six food dyes (Tartrazine, Allura Red, Ponceau 4R, Quinoline Yellow WS, Sunset Yellow and Carmoisine (dubbed the "Southampton 6")) and sodium benzoate (a preservative) on children in the general population, who consumed them in beverages; the study published in 2007. The study found "a possible link between the consumption of these artificial colours and a sodium benzoate preservative and increased hyperactivity" in the children; the advisory committee to the FSA that evaluated the study also determined that because of study limitations, the results could not be extrapolated to the general population, and further testing was recommended.

In 2008 Scotland asked for Scottish food producers voluntarily stop using these food dyes. A 2010 study found that one third of food producers were still using at least one of the Southampton Six.

== Other uses ==
=== 3D printing ===
Tartrazine has been used as a biocompatible photoblocker for generating transparent hydrogels with complex inner structures.

=== Tartrazine-enabled tissue clearing ===
In 2024, the Hong Lab at Stanford demonstrated aqueous solutions of tartrazine can render some biological tissues such as the skin more transparent in live mice, as well as dead mouse and chicken tissues by leveraging its strong resonant absorption in the blue region of the spectrum and by modulating refractive indices at longer wavelengths via the Kramers–Kronig relations. This property has been independently verified by multiple laboratories and has been applied to improve imaging depth in several optical imaging techniques such as optical coherence tomography and photoacoustic imaging. In 2025, Valery V. Tuchin, a pioneer in tissue clearing, demonstrated tartrazine can also make the skull more transparent in live mice, enabling transcranial laser speckle imaging of cortical blood flow in real time. In addition, a number of other labs have demonstrated the utility of tartrazine to enable deep-tissue Raman sensing and fluorescence lifetime imaging.

== See also ==
- Sunset yellow FCF, also known as Yellow 6
