= Joint FAO/WHO Expert Committee on Food Additives =

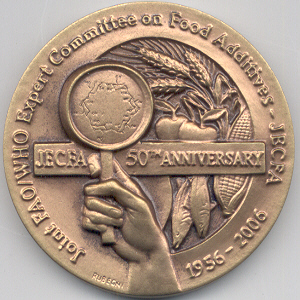
FAO Commemorative 2006 Joint FAO-WHO Food Additives Bronze Reverse

The Joint FAO/WHO Expert Committee on Food Additives (JECFA) is an international scientific expert committee that is administered jointly by the Food and Agriculture Organization of the United Nations (FAO) and the World Health Organization (WHO). It has been meeting since 1956 to provide independent scientific advice pertaining to the safety evaluation of food additives. Its current scope of work now also includes the evaluation of contaminants, naturally occurring toxicants and residues of veterinary drugs in food.

== The role of JECFA ==
As the FAO/WTO publication describes, global food safety can be difficult to ensure without international reference standards. While all countries require access to reliable risk assessments of the various chemicals in our food, not all have the resources or the funds available to conduct such evaluations for a large number of substances. Through expert-driven risk assessments JECFA defines the safe exposure levels to chemicals found in food. JECFA plays a key role by providing scientific advice that is both reliable and independent, thereby contributing to the setting of standards on a global scale for the protection of consumer health while ensuring trade of safe food. Over time JECFA has developed and updated the methods for risk assessments of chemicals in food. The Environmental Health Criteria 240 or EHC 240 captures this work and constitutes the international point of reference recognized by national and regional food safety authorities.

== JECFA organization ==
JECFA normally meets twice a year. The meetings either cover (i) food additives, contaminants and naturally occurring toxicants in food or (ii) residues of veterinary drugs in food. Different sets of experts (called Members for the purposes of the meeting) are invited to these meetings to solicit their expertise depending on the topics being discussed.

Sometimes FAO and WHO may also convene expert meetings to provide scientific advice on issues that are related to chemical food safety but fall outside the purview of JECFA. These ad hoc meetings are called either in response to specific requests from Codex, and/or to advise national authorities on risks or incidents that affect consumers’ health and have serious economic and trade repercussions.

== Dissemination of information ==
The work of the Codex Alimentarius Commission (CAC), which is the most important international body in the field of food standards, is based on the scientific advice provided by bodies like JECFA. This advice to CAC is normally provided to the various Codex Committees, such as the Codex Committee on Food Additives (CCFA), Codex Committee on Contaminants in Food (CCCF), and the Codex Committee on Residues of Veterinary Drugs (CCVRDF).

FAO, WHO and the member countries of both the organizations also benefit from the evaluations made by JECFA. Some use the information from JECFA to establish their own national food safety control programs.

The JECFA Committee also develops principles for the safety assessment of chemicals in food that are consistent with current scientific knowledge on risk assessments, while taking into account the recent developments in toxicology and other relevant scientific areas such as epidemiology, biotechnology, exposure assessment, food chemistry including analytical chemistry and assessment of maximum residue limits for veterinary drugs.

=== JECFA publications ===
Resources produced for or after the JECFA meetings include:

- Summary and Conclusions report
- Chemical & Technical Assessments (CTA)
- Full JECFA Meeting reports published in the WHO Technical Report Series
- Compendium of FAO Food Additive Specifications
- Veterinary drug residues monographs published in the FAO JECFA Monograph series
- Toxicological monographs published in the WHO Food Additive Series (FAS)

== Harmonization efforts ==
Beginning in the late 1990s, the United States Food and Drug Administration (FDA) has actively aligned its toxicological testing recommendations with JECFA through the Redbook 2000 guidance document (updated through 2007). Redbook 2000 explicitly encourages the use of JECFA-style study designs, acceptable daily intake (ADI) derivations, and harmonized endpoints for genotoxicity, reproductive toxicity, and chronic/carcinogenicity assessments, enabling data generated for one authority to be more readily accepted by the other.

Since the early 2010s, JECFA and the European Food Safety Authority (EFSA) have worked toward closer alignment and continuous updating of risk assessment methodologies for food additives and contaminants, through joint re-evaluations (e.g., synthetic colours and lycopene), harmonised genotoxicity guidance, integration of JECFA data into EFSA’s OpenFoodTox database, and regular collaborative projects such as the 2016 TTC revision and 2024 automated data-exchange initiatives.
