= Benjamin Feingold =

American pediatric allergist

Benjamin F. Feingold (June 15, 1899 in Pittsburgh, Pennsylvania – March 23, 1982) was a pediatric allergist from California who proposed in 1973 that salicylates, artificial colors, and artificial flavors cause hyperactivity in children. Hyperactivity is now classified as Attention deficit hyperactivity disorder (ADHD).

== Biography ==
=== Education ===
Feingold received a BS degree in 1921, and an MD in 1924, from the University of Pittsburgh, Pennsylvania. He performed his internship at Passavant Hospital, Pittsburgh, Pennsylvania from 1924 to 1925. He did a fellowship in Pathology at the University of Göttingen, Germany in 1927. Between 1928 and 1929, he worked under Professor Clemens von Pirquet.

=== Career ===
Feingold worked as the house officer at the children's clinic of the University of Vienna, Austria from 1928 to 1929. From 1929 to 1932, he was clinical instructor of Pediatrics at the Northwestern University School of Medicine. From 1932 to 1958, he worked as attending physician in Pediatrics and in Infectious Diseases at Los Angeles County General Hospital, Los Angeles. He also worked as attending physician in Pediatrics at Cedars of Lebanon Hospital, Los Angeles from 1932 to 1941, and at Los Angeles Children's Hospital from 1932 to 1951. He was Chief of Pediatrics at Cedars of Lebanon Hospital, Los Angeles, and an Associate in Allergy at the Los Angeles Children's Hospital from 1945 to 1951. In 1951, he joined the Kaiser Foundation Hospital and Permanente Medical Group, and established all of the Departments of Allergy for Northern California. From 1952 to 1969, he was Kaiser's chief of Allergy, and the chairman of their central research committee. From then until his death in 1982, he was Chief Emeritus, Department of Allergy, Kaiser Permanente Medical Center.

=== Personal life ===
He married Lois Maxine Adler November 18, 1930. They had four children, all born in Los Angeles, California. From 1941 to 1945, he was a commander in the US Naval Reserve. He and Lois were divorced in 1950. He married Helene Samuels on June 21, 1951.

=== Publications ===
Besides numerous technical publications in the fields of allergy and basic immunology, he published the books Introduction to Clinical Allergy, Why your child is hyperactive, and the Feingold cookbook for hyperactive children.

== The Feingold diet ==
To treat or prevent hyperactivity, Feingold suggested a diet that was free of salicylates, artificial colors, artificial flavors, BHA, and BHT. Although the diet was popular, scientific research found no good evidence that it was effective.

== See also ==
- Diet and attention deficit hyperactivity disorder
