= Acceptable daily intake =

Measure of a substance in food or water

Acceptable daily intake or ADI is a measure of the amount of a specific substance (originally applied for a food additive, later also for a residue of a veterinary drug or pesticide) in food or drinking water that can be ingested (orally) daily over a lifetime without an appreciable health risk. ADIs are expressed usually in milligrams (of the substance) per kilograms of body weight per day.

== History ==
This concept was first introduced in 1961 by the Council of Europe and later, the Joint FAO/WHO Expert Committee on Food Additives (JECFA), a committee maintained by two United Nations bodies: the Food and Agriculture Organization (FAO) and the World Health Organization (WHO).

== Concept ==
An ADI value is based on current research, with long-term studies on animals and observations of humans. First, a no-observed-adverse-effect level (NOAEL), the amount of a substance that shows no toxic effects, is determined. Usually the studies are performed with several doses including high doses. In the case of several studies on different effects, the lowest NOAEL is usually taken. Then, the NOAEL (or another point of departure such as a benchmark dose level (BMDL)) is divided by a safety factor, conventionally 100, to account for the differences between test animals and humans (factor of 10) and possible differences in sensitivity between humans (another factor of 10). Safety factors with values other than 100 may be used if information on uncertainty about the value of the point of departure (NOAEL or BMDL) justify it. For instance, if the ADI is based on data from humans the safety factor is usually 10 instead of 100. The ADI is usually given in mg per kg body weight.

The ADI is considered a safe intake level for a healthy adult of normal weight who consumes an average daily amount of the substance in question. Increased safety factors for infants have been discussed, but are not needed, because elimination of chemicals is in fact often more rapid in children and as children generally have higher illness rates than adults, adverse effects caused by food additives can easily be disguised as any number of things children usually experience. It would be far more difficult to argue the case with a healthy adult. The ADI does not take into account allergic reactions that are individual responses rather than dose-dependent phenomena.

The higher the ADI, the larger amounts of a compound are safe for regular ingestion. The concept of tolerable daily intake is often used for unwanted contaminants or other chemicals.

The ADI concept can be understood as a measure to indicate the toxicity from long-term exposure to repeated ingestion of chemical compounds in foods (present and/or added), as opposed to acute toxicity.

The threshold limit value (TLV) of a chemical substance is a level to which it is believed a worker can be exposed day after day for a working lifetime without adverse effects.

== See also ==
- Acceptability
- Banana Equivalent Dose
- Dietary Reference Intake
- Food labeling regulations
- International Programme on Chemical Safety
- Reference dose
