= Gad =

Gad or GAD may refer to:

== Government and politics ==
- General Administration Department, of Burma's Ministry of Home Affairs
- Government Actuary's Department, of the Government of the United Kingdom
- Grand Alliance for Democracy, a Philippine political coalition
- People's Liberation Army General Armaments Department

== People and religion ==
- Gad (name), a list of people with the surname, given name or nickname
- Gad (son of Jacob), the founder of the tribe of Gad and seventh son of Jacob
  - Tribe of Gad, a tribe of the ancient Kingdom of Israel
- Gad (prophet), King David's seer or prophet
- Gad (deity), a pan-Semitic deity worshipped during the Babylonian captivity

== Places ==
- Gad, West Virginia, flooded in the construction of Summersville Lake, United States
- Gad, Wisconsin, an unincorporated community, United States
- Gad Cliff, Dorset, England
- Gad River, Maharashtra, India
- Gad, a village in Ghilad Commune, Timiș County, Romania
- GAD, IATA airport code and FAA location identifier for Northeast Alabama Regional Airport, United States

== Medicine, biology, and chemistry ==
- Generalized anxiety disorder
- Gadolinium-based MRI contrast agent
- Glutamate decarboxylase, an enzyme in mammals
- Glycoazodyes, synthetic dyes

== Other uses ==
- gad, ISO 639-3 code for the Gaddang language, spoken in the Philippines
- Gender and development, a feminist interdisciplinary field of research and applied study
- General Anthropology Division of the American Anthropological Association
- Great dodecahedron, a regular polyhedron

== See also ==
- GADS (disambiguation)
- Gadd, a surname
