= Benzimidazolone pigments =

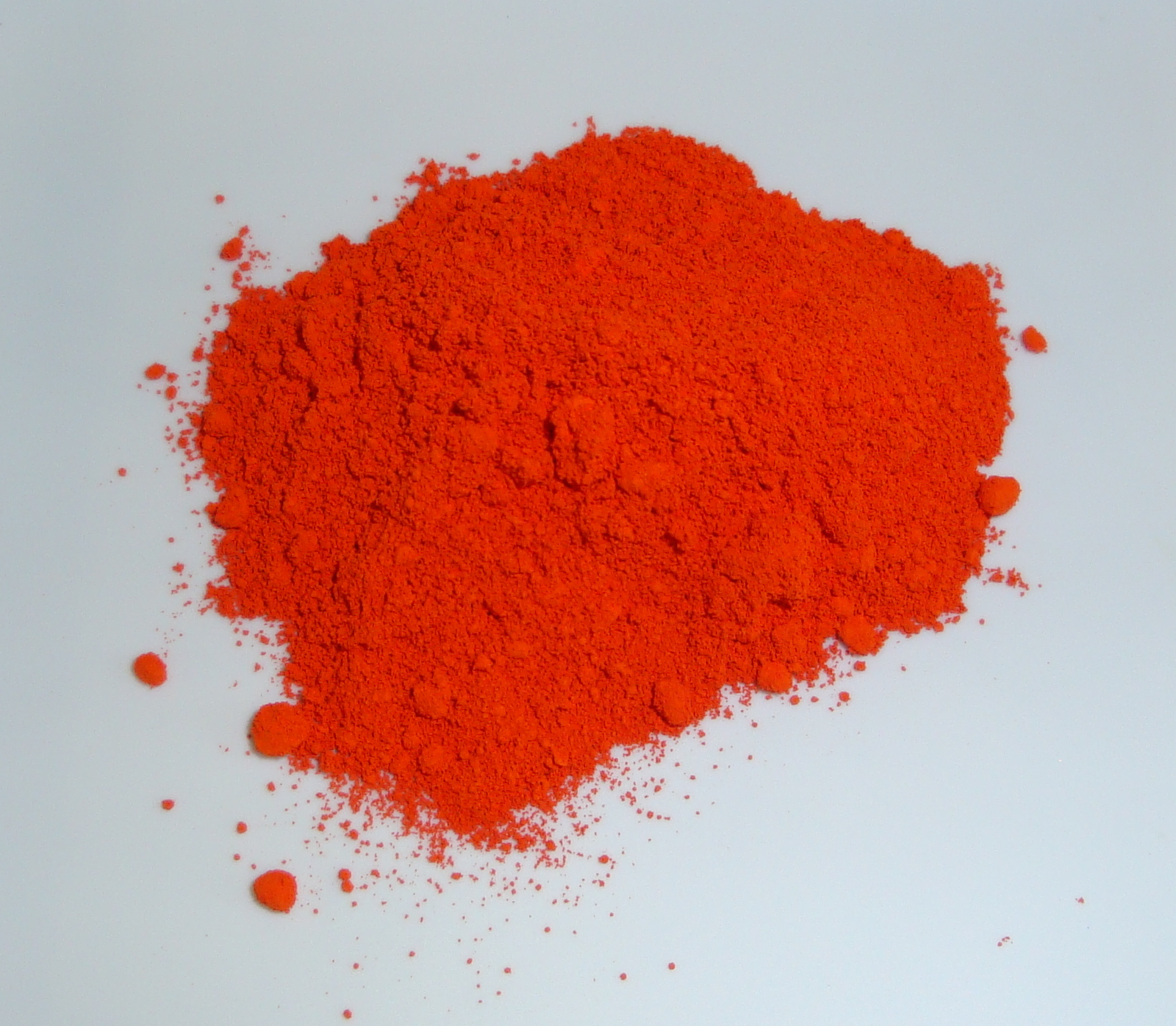
C.I. Pigment Orange 36

Benzimidazolone pigments, or benzimidazolone azo pigments for short, are azo pigments named after the benzimidazolone group contained in the coupling component and are characterized by exceptional color fastness. Benzimidazolones were developed and manufactured by Hoechst and patented in 1960. They were first used as pigments in the late 1970s. Although relatively expensive, they are among the most durable organic pigments.

== Extraction and production ==
Like other azo pigments, benzimidazolone pigments are produced by azo coupling of diazotized aromatic amines with a coupling component containing the benzimidazolone group. Depending on the resulting color, the pigments are classified into yellow and red series. The use of 5-acetoacetylamino-benzimidazolone produces pigments of the yellow series, whereas 5-(2'-hydroxy-3'-naphthoyl)-aminobenzimidazolone yields pigments of the red series.

== Classification ==
Together, both series comprise approximately 20 azo pigments covering a broad color spectrum. The commercially most important pigments are Colour Index Pigment Yellow 151, Pigment Yellow 154 (brilliant yellow), and Pigment Orange 36, all belonging to the yellow range. Other important representatives in the yellow range include Pigment Yellow 120, Pigment Yellow 175, Pigment Yellow 180, Pigment Yellow 181, and Pigment Yellow 194. The orange-colored pigments include C.I. Pigment Orange 36, Pigment Orange 60, Pigment Orange 62, and Pigment Orange 72, while the red pigments include Pigment Red 171, Pigment Red 175, Pigment Red 176, Pigment Red 185, and Pigment Red 208. Representatives in the bordeaux range are Pigment Violet 32 and Pigment Brown 25.

General structural formula (yellow series)

General structural formula (red series)

The structure of C.I. Pigment Yellow 151 is representative of pigments in the yellow series. The fundamental structure common to all azo colorants is readily recognizable. Benzimidazolone pigments are distinguished by the characteristic 5-aminocarbonylbenzimidazolone group in the diazo component (in the diagram, the section on the far right beginning with the amide group). Variations in color within the series result from different arrangements of the substituents on the aryl residue of the diazo component (shown to the left of the azo group in the diagram).

Structural formula of C.I.Pigment Yellow 151

== Properties ==
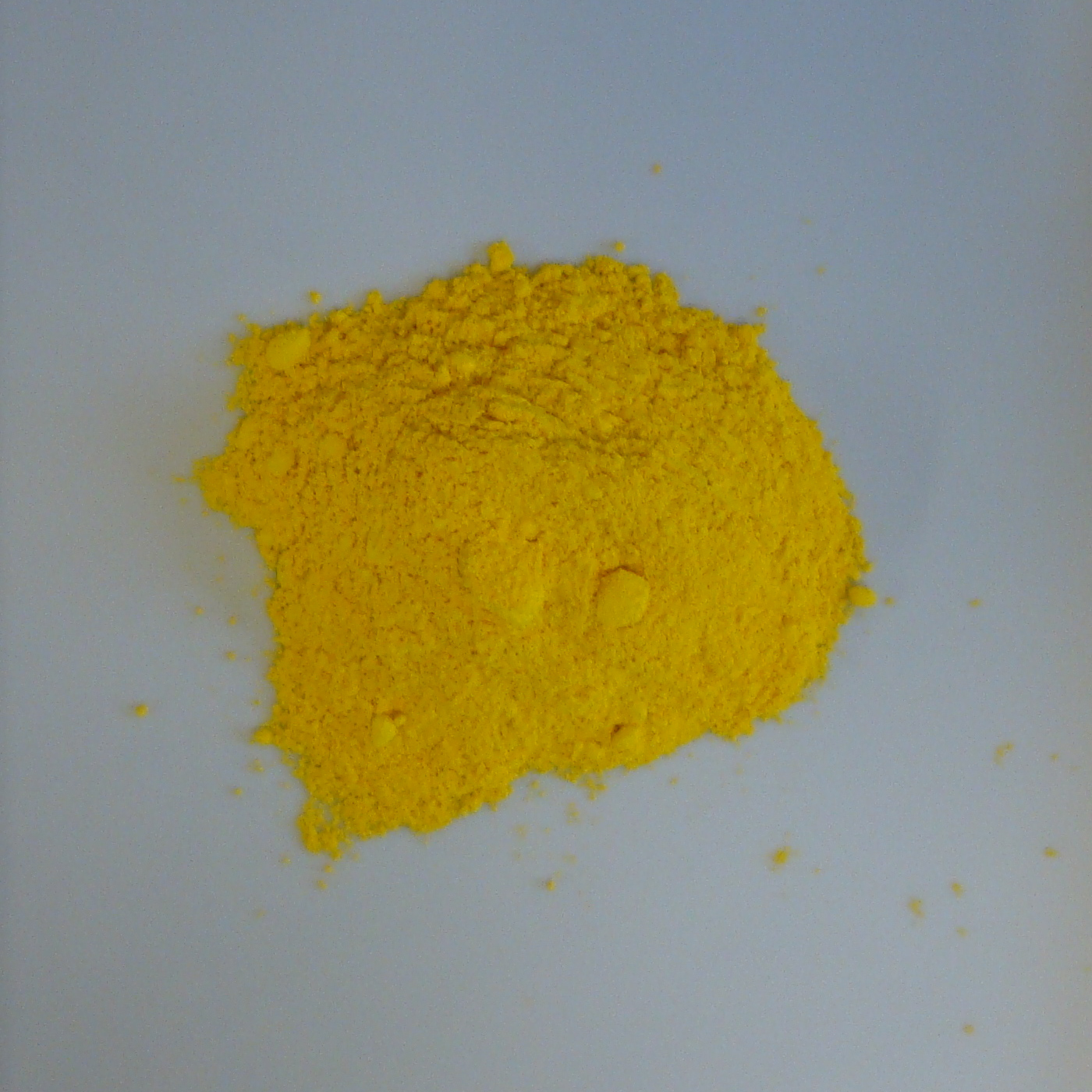
C.I. Pigment Yellow 154

The pigments of the yellow series exhibit nuances ranging from greenish yellow to orange, while those of the red series range from yellowish red to bordeaux. All pigments in this group are characterized by exceptionally high light fastness and weather fastness, significantly superior to those of conventional azo pigments. The pigments are resistant to migration (paint), acids, bases (chemistry), and solvents, and also exhibit good dispersibility. Most pigments in this group additionally possess high temperature resistance.

== Use ==
Benzimidazolone pigments are technically used in emulsion paints and varnishes, high-quality printing inks, plastics, and artists' paints. Owing to their performance characteristics, benzimidazolone pigments are employed in demanding applications such as automotive coatings, powder coatings, and coil coatings.

== Literature ==
- W. Herbst, K. Hunger (1997), Industrial Organic Pigments (2. ed.), Weinheim: Wiley-VCH, ISBN 3-527-28744-2
- Kittel (2003), Lehrbuch der Lacke und Beschichtungen (in German) (2. ed.), Stuttgart Leipzig: S.Hirzel, ISBN 3-7776-1015-1
- G. Etzrodt, A. Müller (2018), Kunststoffeinfärbung (in German) (2. ed.), München: Carl Hanser Verlag, ISBN 978-3-446-45462-0
