= Benzimidazolinone =

Names
- IUPAC name 2-Benzimidazolinone
- Other names 1,3-Dihydro-2H-benzimidazol-2-one; 2-Hydroxybenzimidazole; N,N′-(1,2-Phenylene)urea

Identifiers
CAS Number	615-16-7
3D model (JSmol)	Interactive image
ChEMBL	ChEMBL2152713
ChemSpider	11490
ECHA InfoCard	100.009.467
EC Number	210-412-4
PubChem CID	11985
UNII	CV8118UZEW
CompTox Dashboard (EPA)	DTXSID0060642
- InChI: InChI=1S/C7H6N2O/c10-7-8-5-3-1-2-4-6(5)9-7/h1-4H,(H2,8,9,10) Key: SILNNFMWIMZVEQ-UHFFFAOYSA-N
- SMILES: C1=CC=C2C(=C1)NC(=O)N2

Properties
Chemical formula	C_{7}H_{6}N_{2}O
Molar mass	134.138 g·mol^{−1}
Appearance	white solid

Hazards
- GHS labelling
Pictograms	(GHS07: Exclamation mark)
Signal word	Warning
Hazard statements	H302
Precautionary statements	P264, P270, P301+P317, P330, P501
- Except where otherwise noted, data are given for materials in their standard state (at 25 °C [77 °F], 100 kPa). Infobox references

Benzimidazolinone is an organic compound with the formula C_{6}H_{4}(NH)_{2}CO. Also classified as a heterocyclic compound, it is a bicyclic urea. It is a tautomer of 2-hydroxybenzimidazole.

== Synthesis, structure, applications ==
Pigment Orange 36

The parent compound is prepared by the carbonylation of 1,2-diaminobenzene. The carbonylation can be effected with carbonyldiimidazole. Like other ureas, it engages in hydrogen bonding, yielding supramolecular structures.

== Benzimidazolinones ==
Although the parent compound is of little interest per se, many derivatives are useful.

=== Benzimidazolinone dyes ===
Substituted 2-benzimidazolinones are commercial dyes and pigments. For example 4-amino-2-benzimidazolinone condenses with diketene to give the acetoacetanilide, which undergoes diazo coupling with various aryldiazonium salts. In this way pigment orange 36 and pigment yellow 154 are produced. These pigments are used in paints and plastics.

The structures of the azo-dyes has been determined by X-ray crystallography. Structurally related benzimidazolone pigments include Pigment Red 175, Pigment Red 176, Pigment Violet 32, and Pigment Brown 25.

=== Drugs ===
- Domperidone, an antiemetic
- Benperidol, an antipsychotic Sumanirole: A selective D2 receptor full agonist developed for Parkinson's disease.
- Sumanirole, for treatment of Parkinson's disease
- Droperidol, a sedative
- Flibanserin, for treatment of hypoactive disorders
