= C34H24N6Na4O16S4 =

The molecular formula C_{34}H_{24}N_{6}Na_{4}O_{16}S_{4} (molar mass: 992.80 g/mol, exact mass: 991.9723 u) may refer to:

- Direct Blue 1
- Direct Blue 15
