= N-Ethyl-N-(2-chloroethyl)aniline =

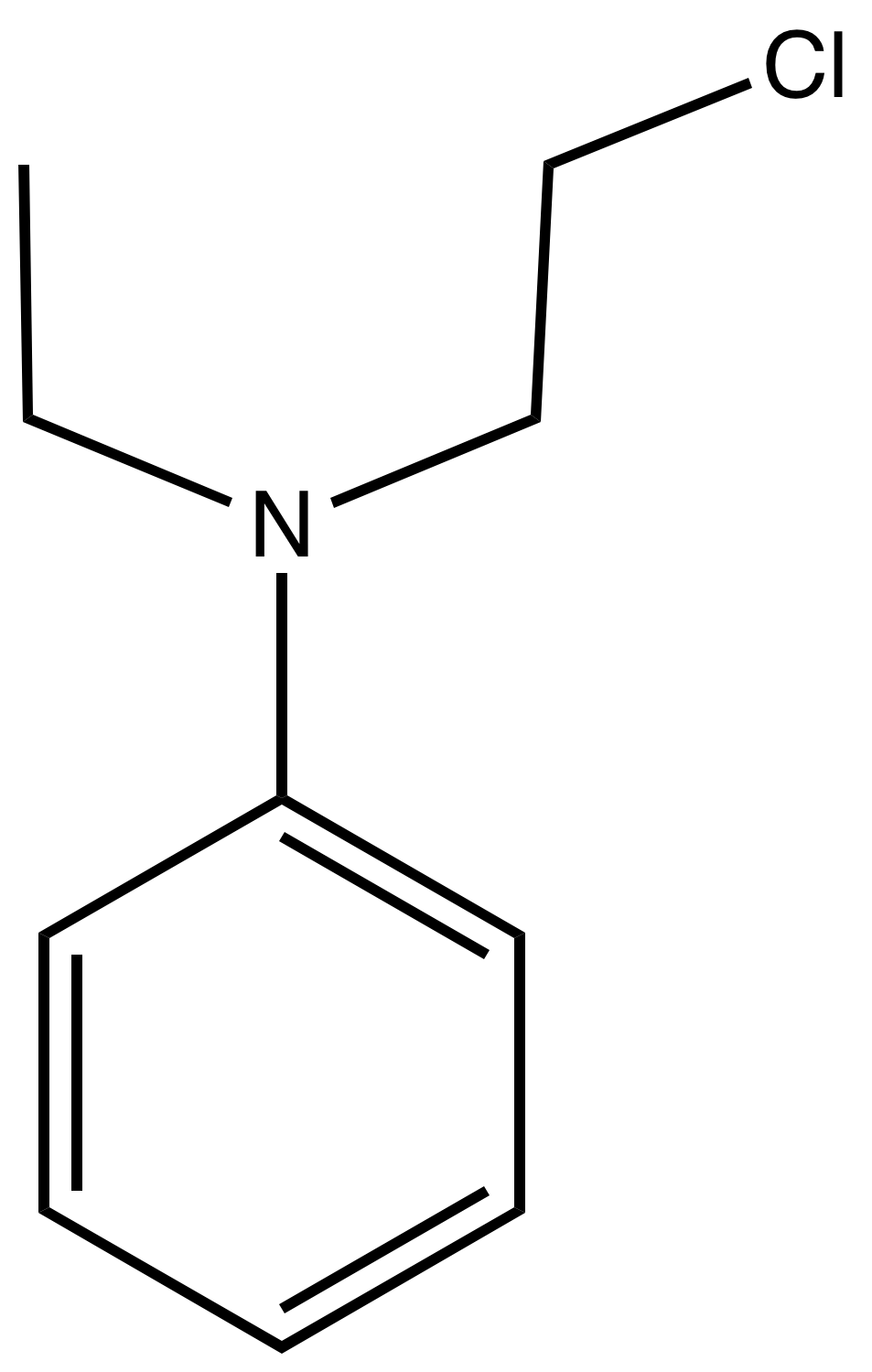

Names
- Preferred IUPAC name N-(2-Chloroethyl)-N-ethylaniline
- Other names Ethyl(chloroethyl)aniline

Identifiers
CAS Number	92-49-9
3D model (JSmol)	Interactive image
ChemSpider	6826
ECHA InfoCard	100.001.964
EC Number	202-159-3
PubChem CID	7093
UNII	YRZ30ATK2G
CompTox Dashboard (EPA)	DTXSID6052615
- InChI: InChI=1S/C10H14ClN/c1-2-12(9-8-11)10-6-4-3-5-7-10/h3-7H,2,8-9H2,1H3 Key: DBDNQNARCHWMSP-UHFFFAOYSA-N
- SMILES: CCN(CCCl)C1=CC=CC=C1

Properties
Chemical formula	C_{10}H_{14}ClN
Molar mass	183.68 g·mol^{−1}
Appearance	Colorless or white solid
Melting point	45.5–46.5 °C (113.9–115.7 °F; 318.6–319.6 K)

Hazards
- GHS labelling
Pictograms	(GHS06: Toxic)
Signal word	Danger
Hazard statements	H301, H311
Precautionary statements	P264, P270, P280, P301+P310, P302+P352, P312, P321, P322, P330, P361, P363, P405, P501
- Except where otherwise noted, data are given for materials in their standard state (at 25 °C [77 °F], 100 kPa). Infobox references

N-Ethyl-N-(2-chloroethyl)aniline is the organic compound with the formula C_{6}H_{5}N(Et)(CH_{2}CH_{2}Cl) (Et = ethyl). It is a low-melting colorless solid that is an alkylating agent. The compound is a precursor to several cationic azo dyes via reaction of the chloroethyl group with tertiary amines or pyridine followed by azo coupling. Examples of derived dyes include C. I. Basic Red 18, Maxilon Red 2GL, and Yoracryl Red 2G.
