= Pigment orange 36 =

Identifiers
CAS Number	12236-62-3
3D model (JSmol)	Interactive image
ChemSpider	21160020
ECHA InfoCard	100.032.227
EC Number	235-462-4
PubChem CID	25535
UNII	649L6L708A
CompTox Dashboard (EPA)	DTXSID9041732
- InChI: InChI=1S/C17H13ClN6O5/c1-8(25)15(23-22-12-4-2-9(18)6-14(12)24(28)29)16(26)19-10-3-5-11-13(7-10)21-17(27)20-11/h2-7,15H,1H3,(H,19,26)(H2,20,21,27) Key: DLQMNSDNQWLFSS-UHFFFAOYSA-N
- SMILES: CC(=O)C(C(=O)NC1=CC2=C(C=C1)NC(=O)N2)N=NC3=C(C=C(C=C3)Cl)[N+](=O)[O-]
- Except where otherwise noted, data are given for materials in their standard state (at 25 °C [77 °F], 100 kPa). Infobox references

C.I. Pigment Orange 36 is a chemical compound belonging to the group of benzimidazolone pigments and classified as one of the azo pigments.

== Preparation ==
Pigment Orange 36 is synthesized by the azo coupling of diazotized 4-chloro-2-nitroaniline with 5-(acetoacetylamino)benzimidazolone as the coupling component.

== Properties ==
Pigment Orange 36 is a reddish, slightly opaque orange pigment with very good weather resistance and light fastness.

X-ray structure analysis show that benzimidazolone pigments possess a planar structure. In addition to intramolecular hydrogen bonds, intermolecular hydrogen bonds are also present. Although the pigment structure is generally described in the literature as containing an azo group, the oxohydrazo tautomer is present in the solid state. Structurally related benzimidazolone pigments include Pigment Red 175, Pigment Red 176, Pigment Violet 32, and Pigment Brown 25.

== Uses ==
Pigment Orange 36 is of considerable market importance and is used primarily in the paint industry. In combination with quinacridone pigments and partial additions of titanium dioxide, it is used to produce lightfast and weather-resistant coatings in RAL color 3000 (fire red), 3002 (carmine red), 3003 (ruby red), and 3013 (tomato red). It is also used in automotive refinishing coatings, commercial vehicle and agricultural machinery paints, and other industrial coatings.
