= Direct Blue 15 =

Identifiers
CAS Number	2429-74-5
3D model (JSmol)	Interactive image
ChemSpider	4586373
ECHA InfoCard	100.017.624
EC Number	219-385-3
PubChem CID	17059
UNII	5C44C6888V
CompTox Dashboard (EPA)	DTXSID7020186
- InChI: InChI=1S/C34H28N6O16S4.4Na/c1-55-25-9-15(3-5-23(25)37-39-31-27(59(49,50)51)11-17-7-19(57(43,44)45)13-21(35)29(17)33(31)41)16-4-6-24(26(10-16)56-2)38-40-32-28(60(52,53)54)12-18-8-20(58(46,47)48)14-22(36)30(18)34(32)42;;;;/h3-14,37-38H,35-36H2,1-2H3,(H,43,44,45)(H,46,47,48)(H,49,50,51)(H,52,53,54);;;;/q;4*+1/p-4 Key: JDCJCNVYTGPGAN-UHFFFAOYSA-J
- SMILES: COC1=C(C=CC(=C1)C2=CC(=C(C=C2)NN=C3C(=CC4=CC(=CC(=C4C3=O)N)S(=O)(=O)[O-])S(=O)(=O)[O-])OC)NN=C5C(=CC6=CC(=CC(=C6C5=O)N)S(=O)(=O)[O-])S(=O)(=O)[O-].[Na+].[Na+].[Na+].[Na+]

Properties
Chemical formula	C_{34}H_{24}N_{6}Na_{4}O_{16}S_{4}
Molar mass	992.79 g·mol^{−1}
Appearance	dark blue solid
Solubility in water	good

Hazards
- GHS labelling
Pictograms	(GHS08: Health hazard)
Signal word	Danger
Hazard statements	H350
Precautionary statements	P201, P202, P281, P308+P313, P405, P501
- Except where otherwise noted, data are given for materials in their standard state (at 25 °C [77 °F], 100 kPa). Infobox references

Direct Blue 15 is an organic compound that is classified as an azo dye. It is a dark blue water soluble solid. It is a popular substantive dye, which means that it useful for dying cotton and related cellulosic materials. It is produced by azo coupling of o-dianisidine with the appropriate naphthalene disulfonate.
