= Metal-complex dyes =

Illustrative chromium dye derived from azo coupling to an azo-ligand. Two such ligands are attached to the Cr(III) center, giving an overall anion.

Metal-complex dyes are a family of dyes that contain metals coordinated to the organic portion. Many azo dyes, especially those derived from naphthols, form metal complexes by complexation of one of the azo nitrogen centers. The insertion of the metal into the organic ligand often involves redox reactions, e.g. pre-reaction of sodium dichromate with glucose. Phthalocyanine (Pc) complexes, such as CuPc, are another important family of metal complex dyes.

Chemical structure proposed for carmine. Also called cochineal, carmine is a pigment derived from a bright-red dye produced by insect.
