= Mordant =

Substance used for binding dyes to fabrics

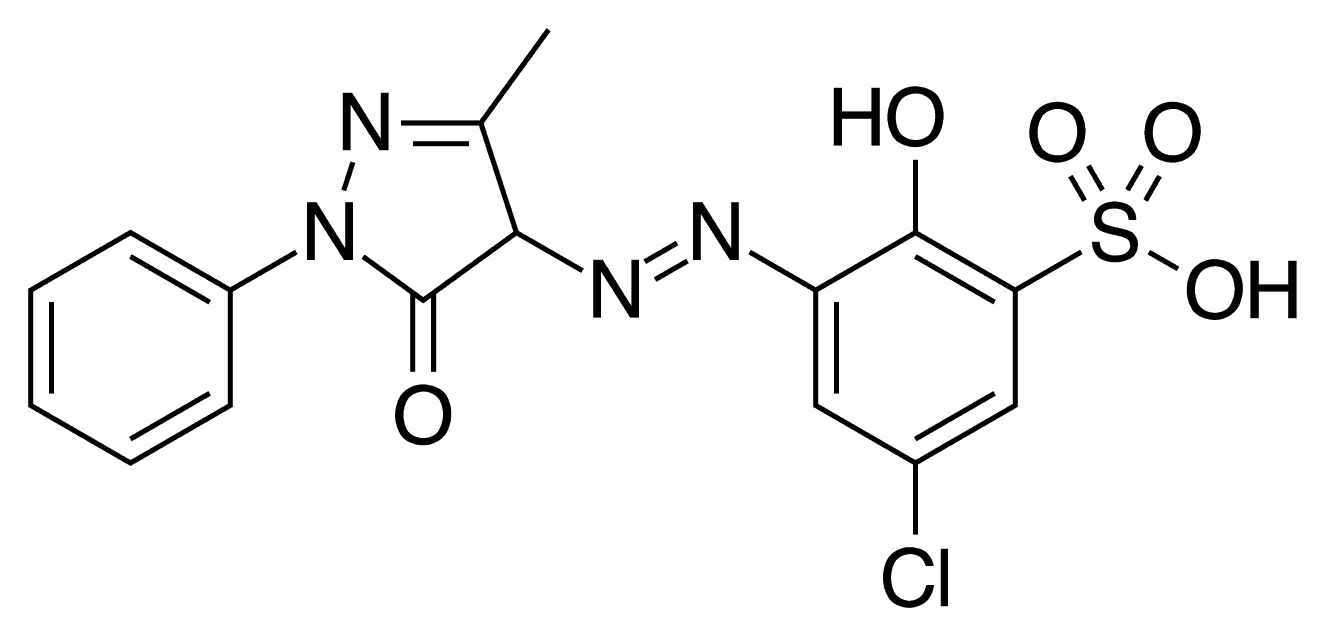
Mordant red 19 is a typical mordant dye. Like many mordant dyes, it features the azo group (RN=NR) and various sites for chelating to metal cations.

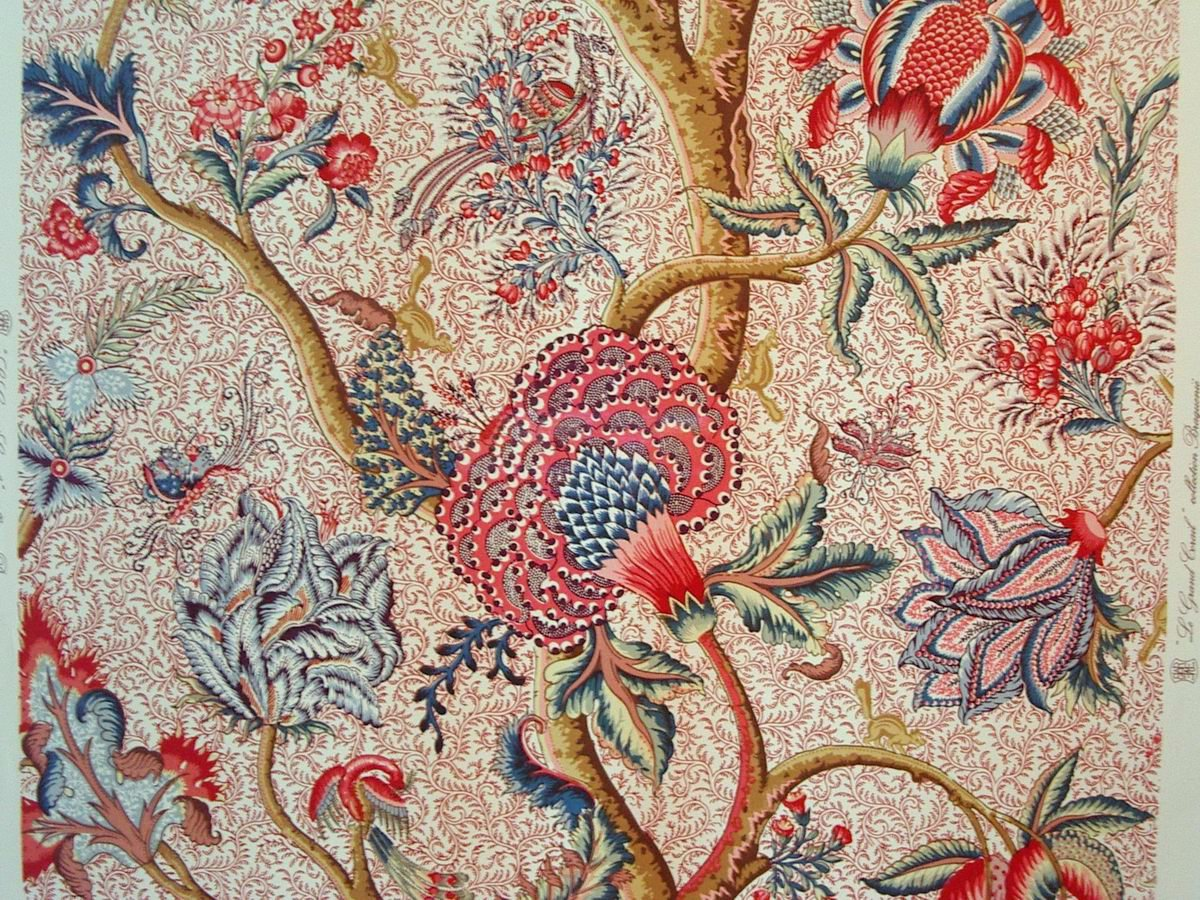
A French Indienne, a printed or painted textile in the manner of Indian productions, which used mordants to fix the dyes

A mordant or dye fixative is a substance used to set (in other words, bind) dyes on fabrics. It does this by forming a coordination complex with the dye, which then attaches to the fabric (or tissue). It may be used for dyeing fabrics or for intensifying stains in cell or tissue preparations. Although mordants are still used, especially by small batch dyers, they have been largely displaced in industry by substantive dyes.

The term mordant comes from the Latin mordere, "to bite". In the past, it was thought that a mordant helped the dye "bite" onto the fiber so that it would hold fast during washing. A mordant is often a polyvalent metal ion, and one example is chromium (III). The resulting coordination complex of dye and ion is colloidal and can be either acidic or alkaline.

== Common dye mordants ==
Mordants include tannic acid, oxalic acid, alum, chrome alum, sodium chloride, and certain salts of aluminium, chromium, copper, iron, iodine, potassium, sodium, tungsten, lead, and tin.

Iodine is often referred to as a mordant in Gram stains, but is in fact a trapping agent.

== Dyeing methods ==
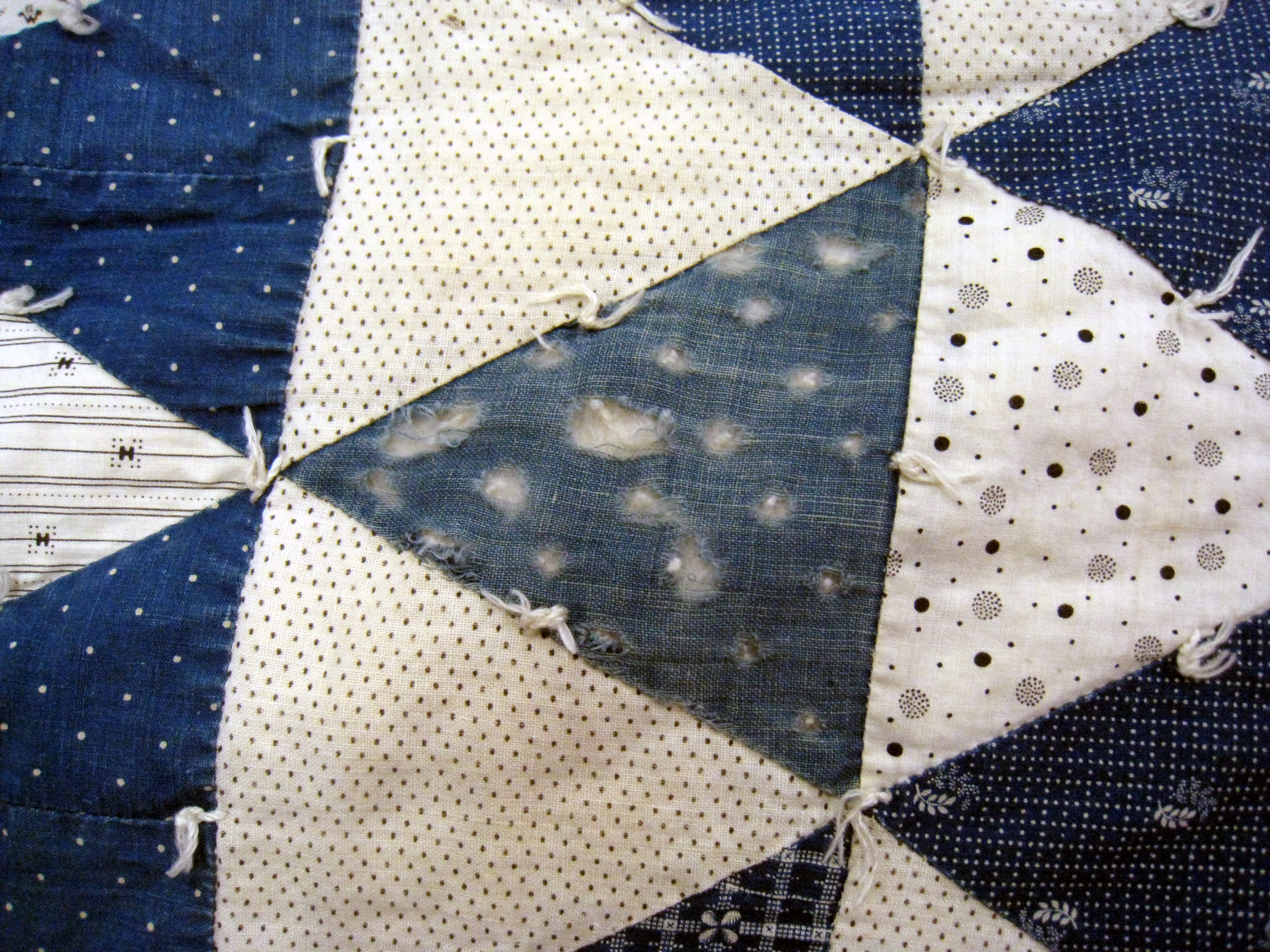
Dye rot from iron mordant

The three methods used for mordanting are:

- Pre-mordanting (onchrome): The substrate is treated with the mordant and then the dye. The complex between the mordant and dye is formed on the fibre.
- Meta-mordanting (metachrome): The mordant is added in the dye bath itself. The process is simpler than pre- or post-mordanting, but is applicable to only a few dyes. Mordant red 19 shown above is applied in this manner
- Post-mordanting (afterchrome): The dyed material is treated with a mordant. The complex between the mordant and dye is formed on the fibre.

The type of mordant used affects the shade obtained after dyeing and, also affects the fastness property of the dye. The application of mordant, either pre-mordant, meta-mordant or post-mordant methods, is influenced by:

- The action of the mordant on the substrate: if the mordant and dye methods are harsh (for example, an acidic mordant with an acidic dye), pre-mordanting or post-mordanting limits the potential for damage to the substrate.
- The stability of the mordant or dye lake or both: the formation of a stable dye lake means that the mordant can be added in the dye without risk of losing the dye properties (meta-mordanting).

Dye results can also rely on the mordant chosen, as the introduction of the mordant into the dye will have a marked effect on the final color. Each dye can have different reactions to each mordant. For example, cochineal scarlet, or Dutch scarlet as it came to be known, used cochineal along with a tin mordant to create a brilliant orange-hued red.

Residual iron mordant can damage or fade fabric, producing "dye rot".

=== Dye lake ===
The dye lake is an insoluble complex formed upon combining the dye and mordant, which then attaches to the substrate. Mordants increase the fastness of the dye since the higher molecular weight dye is now bonded to the fibre.

The type of mordant used can change the colour of both the dye-plus-mordant solution and influence the shade of the final product.

=== Wool ===
Unlike cotton, wool is highly receptive toward mordants. Due to its amphoteric nature wool can absorb acids and bases with equal efficiency. When wool is treated with a metallic salt it hydrolyses the salt into an acidic and basic component. The basic component is absorbed at –COOH group and the acidic component is removed during washing. Wool also has a tendency to absorb fine precipitates from solutions; these cling to the surface of fibres and dye particles attached to these contaminants result in poor rubbing fastness.

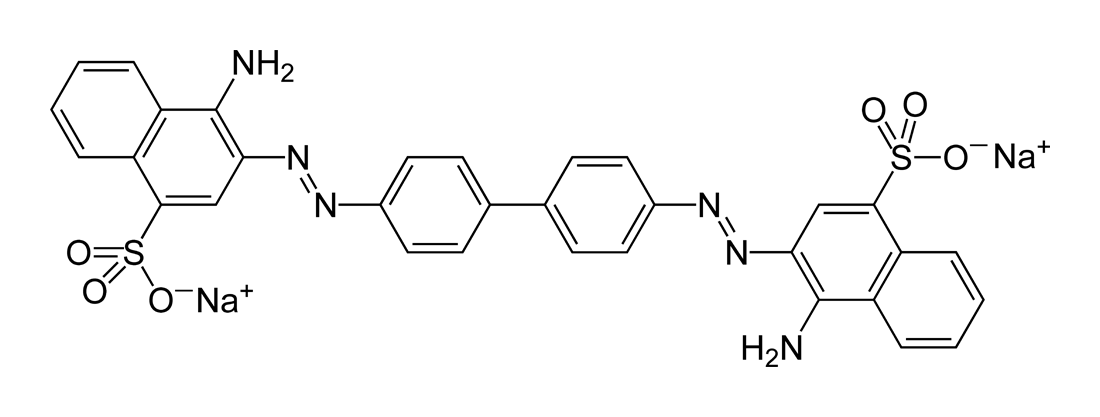
The discovery of Congo red in 1883, followed by many other synthetic azo dyes, heralded the demise of mordant dyes.

=== Silk ===
Like wool, silk is also amphoteric and can absorb both acids and bases. However, wool has thio groups (-SH) from the cystine amino acid, which act as reducing agent and can reduce hexavalent chromium of potassium dichromate to trivalent form. Silk proteins contain very little cystine. Since the reduced, trivalent chromium forms the complex with the fibre and dye, not the original hexavalent chromium, potassium dichromate cannot be used effectively as mordant on silk.

=== Animal and plant tissues ===
In histology, mordants are indispensable in fixing dyes to tissues for microscopic examination, such as with a haematoxylin and eosin stain.

Methods for mordant application depend on the desired stain and tissues under study; pre-, meta- and post-mordanting techniques are used as required.
