= Pigment Yellow 154 =

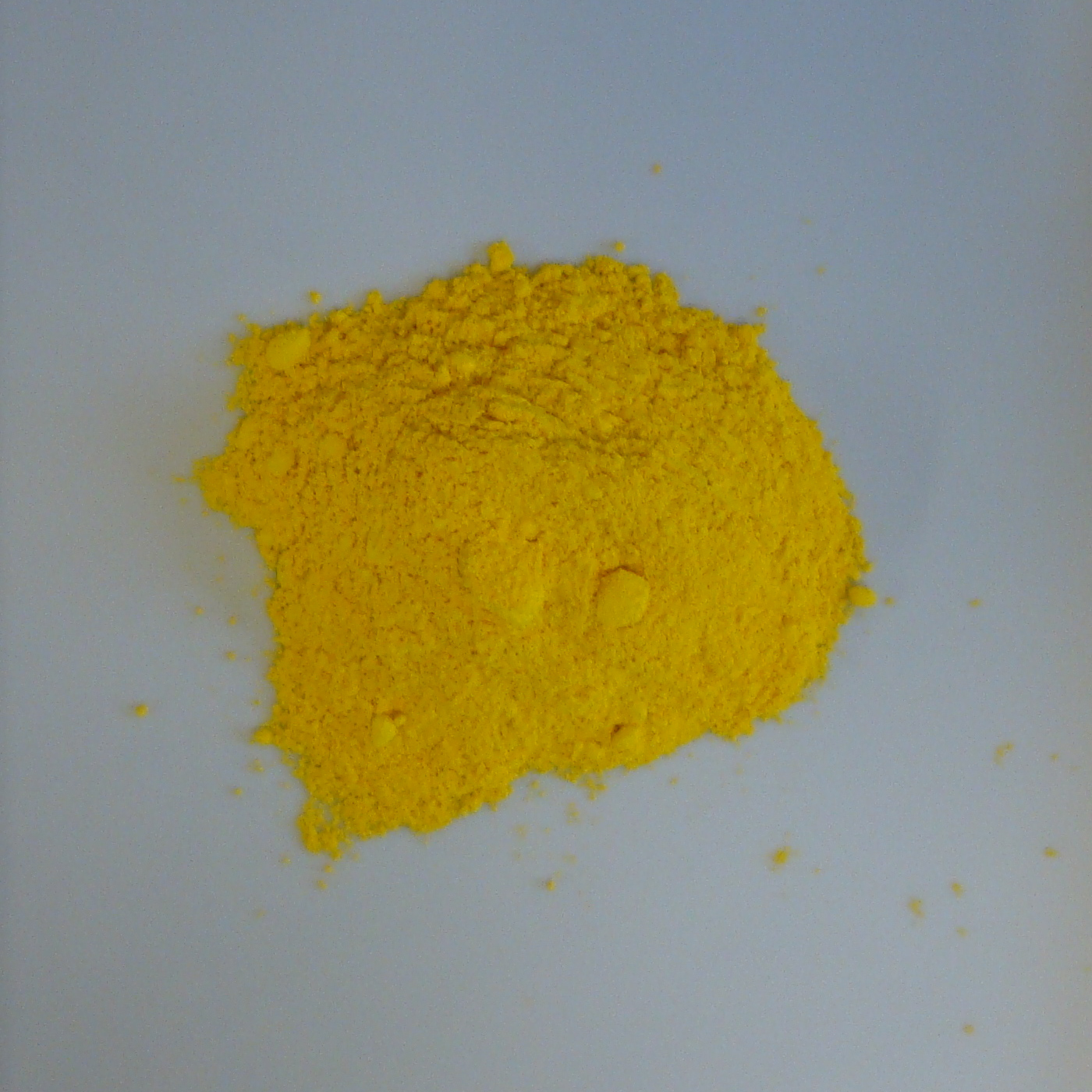

Names
- IUPAC name 3-oxo-N-(2-oxo-1,3-dihydrobenzimidazol-5-yl)-2-[[2-(trifluoromethyl)phenyl]diazenyl]butanamide

Identifiers
CAS Number	68134-22-5
3D model (JSmol)	Interactive image
ECHA InfoCard	100.062.467
EC Number	268-734-6
PubChem CID	109160
CompTox Dashboard (EPA)	DTXSID50867488
- InChI: InChI=1S/C18H14F3N5O3/c1-9(27)15(26-25-12-5-3-2-4-11(12)18(19,20)21)16(28)22-10-6-7-13-14(8-10)24-17(29)23-13/h2-8,15H,1H3,(H,22,28)(H2,23,24,29) Key: VBNVBMNKUIJLPP-UHFFFAOYSA-N
- SMILES: CC(=O)C(C(=O)NC1=CC2=C(C=C1)NC(=O)N2)N=NC3=CC=CC=C3C(F)(F)F

Properties
Chemical formula	C_{18}H_{14}F_{3}N_{5}O_{3}
Molar mass	405.337 g·mol^{−1}
Appearance	yellow solid
Melting point	330 °C (626 °F; 603 K) (decomposes)

Hazards
- GHS labelling
Pictograms	(GHS07: Exclamation mark)
Signal word	Warning
Hazard statements	H319
Precautionary statements	P264+P265, P280, P305+P351+P338, P337+P317
Autoignition temperature	290 °C (554 °F; 563 K)
- Except where otherwise noted, data are given for materials in their standard state (at 25 °C [77 °F], 100 kPa). Infobox references

C.I. Pigment Yellow 154 is a chemical compound belonging to the group of benzimidazolone pigments and classified as one of the azo pigments.

== Properties ==
Pigment Yellow 154 is a yellow pigment characterized by very high lightfastness and weather fastness. It exhibits high resistance to common organic solvents such as alcohols, esters, and hydrocarbons.

== Synthesis ==
Pigment Yellow 154 can be synthesized by azo coupling. The synthesis starts from 2-trifluoromethylaniline, which is diazotized with nitrites and subsequently coupled with 5-(acetoacetylamino)benzimidazolone to form the azo pigment.

== Use ==
Pigment Yellow 154 is primarily used in the paint industry and is considered one of the most weather-resistant organic yellow pigments. It is also used for nuancing other color shades and for producing lightened pure yellow and green shades.
