= O-Dianisidine =

Names
- Preferred IUPAC name 3,3′-Dimethoxy[1,1′-biphenyl]-4,4′-diamine
- Other names 3,3'-dimethoxy-4,4’-benzidine

Identifiers
CAS Number	119-90-4
3D model (JSmol)	Interactive image
ChEBI	CHEBI:82321
ChEMBL	ChEMBL398363
ChemSpider	8104
ECHA InfoCard	100.003.960
EC Number	204-355-4
KEGG	C19231
PubChem CID	8411
RTECS number	DD0875000
UNII	MJY508JZXV
UN number	2811, 2431, 3077
CompTox Dashboard (EPA)	DTXSID3025091
- InChI: InChI=1S/C14H16N2O2/c1-17-13-7-9(3-5-11(13)15)10-4-6-12(16)14(8-10)18-2/h3-8H,15-16H2,1-2H3 Key: JRBJSXQPQWSCCF-UHFFFAOYSA-N
- SMILES: COC1=C(C=CC(=C1)C2=CC(=C(C=C2)N)OC)N

Properties
Chemical formula	C_{14}H_{16}N_{2}O_{2}
Molar mass	244.294 g·mol^{−1}
Appearance	White solid
Density	1.178 g/cm^{3}
Melting point	113 °C (235 °F; 386 K)
Boiling point	356 °C (673 °F; 629 K)
Solubility in water	60 mg/L

Hazards
- GHS labelling
Pictograms	(GHS07: Exclamation mark) (GHS08: Health hazard)
Signal word	Danger
Hazard statements	H302, H350
Precautionary statements	P201, P202, P264, P270, P281, P301+P312, P308+P313, P330, P405, P501
Flash point	206°C
- Except where otherwise noted, data are given for materials in their standard state (at 25 °C [77 °F], 100 kPa). Infobox references

o-Dianisidine is an organic compound with the formula [(CH_{3}O)(H_{2}N)C_{6}H_{3}]_{2}. A colorless or white solid, it is a bifunctional compound derived via the benzidine rearrangement from o-anisidine.

o-Dianisidine is a precursor to some azo dyes by formation of the bis(diazonium) derivative, which is coupled to diverse aromatic compounds. Some commercial dyes derived from o-dianisidine include C. I. Direct Blue 1, 15, 22, 84, and 98.

o-Dianisidine is also used in assaying activity of peroxidase in lab. The general reaction of a peroxidase is as follows.

$$\ce{ROOR' + \overset{electron\atop donor}{2e^-} + 2H+ ->[\ce{Peroxidase}] {ROH} + R'OH}$$

Where the ROOR' can be hydrogen peroxide, and the electron donor be o-dianisidine.

Direct Blue 1 is commercial dye, a derivative of o-dianisidine.

== Safety ==
The manufacture and degradation of o-dianisidine, like other benzidene derivatives, has attracted regulatory attention. It is also used as a reagent in biochemistry in testing for peroxides.
