= Mordant red 19 =

Color coordinates
- Hex triplet: #AE0C00
- sRGB^{B} (r, g, b): (174, 12, 0)
- HSV (h, s, v): (4°, 100%, 68%)
- CIELCh_{uv} (L, C, h): (36, 119, 13°)
- Source: ColorHexa
- ISCC–NBS descriptor: Deep red
- B: Normalized to [0–255] (byte)

Mordant red 19
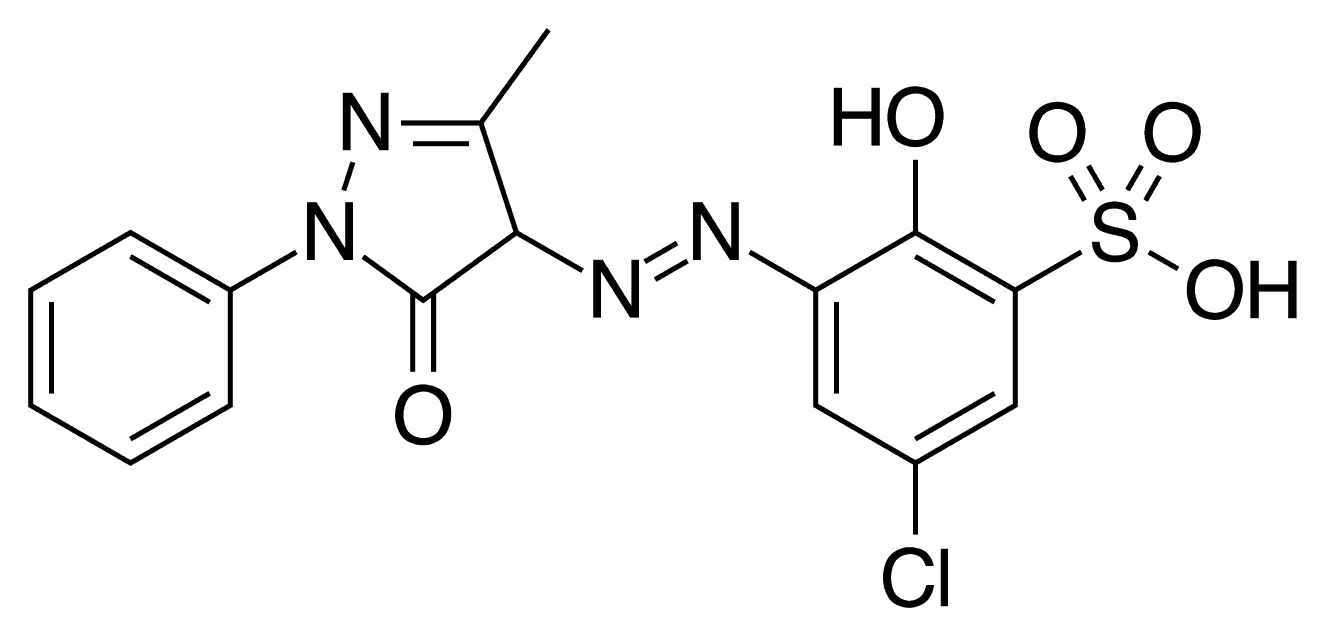

Names
- IUPAC name 5-Chloro-2-hydroxy-3-(3-methyl-5-oxo-1-phenyl-4,5-dihydro-1H-pyrazol-4-ylazo)-benzenesulfonic acid
- Other names C.I. 18735; Superchrome Red G; Magracrom Red 5G; Chrome Red 3G; Durochrome Red 5G; Eriochrome Red 4G; Metachrome Red 5G; Monochrome Red 5G; Solochrome Fast Red; Eriochromal Red 4G

Identifiers
| CAS Number | 25746-81-0; 1934-24-3 (sodium salt) |
| 3D model (JSmol) | Interactive image |
| ChemSpider | 21173045 |
| ECHA InfoCard | 100.042.925 |
| PubChem CID | 5477494 |
| UNII | 9X3KZ37M9X |
- InChI: InChI=1S/C16H13ClN4O5S/c1-9-14(16(23)21(20-9)11-5-3-2-4-6-11)19-18-12-7-10(17)8-13(15(12)22)27(24,25)26/h2-8,14,22H,1H3,(H,24,25,26) Key: LSFNRVBPDLEXDS-UHFFFAOYSA-N; InChI=1/C16H13ClN4O5S/c1-9-14(16(23)21(20-9)11-5-3-2-4-6-11)19-18-12-7-10(17)8-13(15(12)22)27(24,25)26/h2-8,14,22H,1H3,(H,24,25,26) Key: LSFNRVBPDLEXDS-UHFFFAOYAQ
- SMILES: O=C1N(C2=CC=CC=C2)N=C(C)C1/N=N/C3=CC(Cl)=CC(S(O)(=O)=O)=C3O

Properties
| Chemical formula | C_{16}H_{13}ClN_{4}O_{5}S |
| Molar mass | 408.81 g·mol^{−1} |
- Except where otherwise noted, data are given for materials in their standard state (at 25 °C [77 °F], 100 kPa). verify (what is ?) Infobox references

Mordant red 19 is an organic compound with the chemical formula C_{16}H_{13}ClN_{4}O_{5}S. It is classified as an azo dye.

It is a mordant used in textile dyeing, usually in combination with chromium. It is usually found as the sodium salt.

== See also ==
- Alizarin
- List of colors
