= Browning, Wisconsin =

- Town
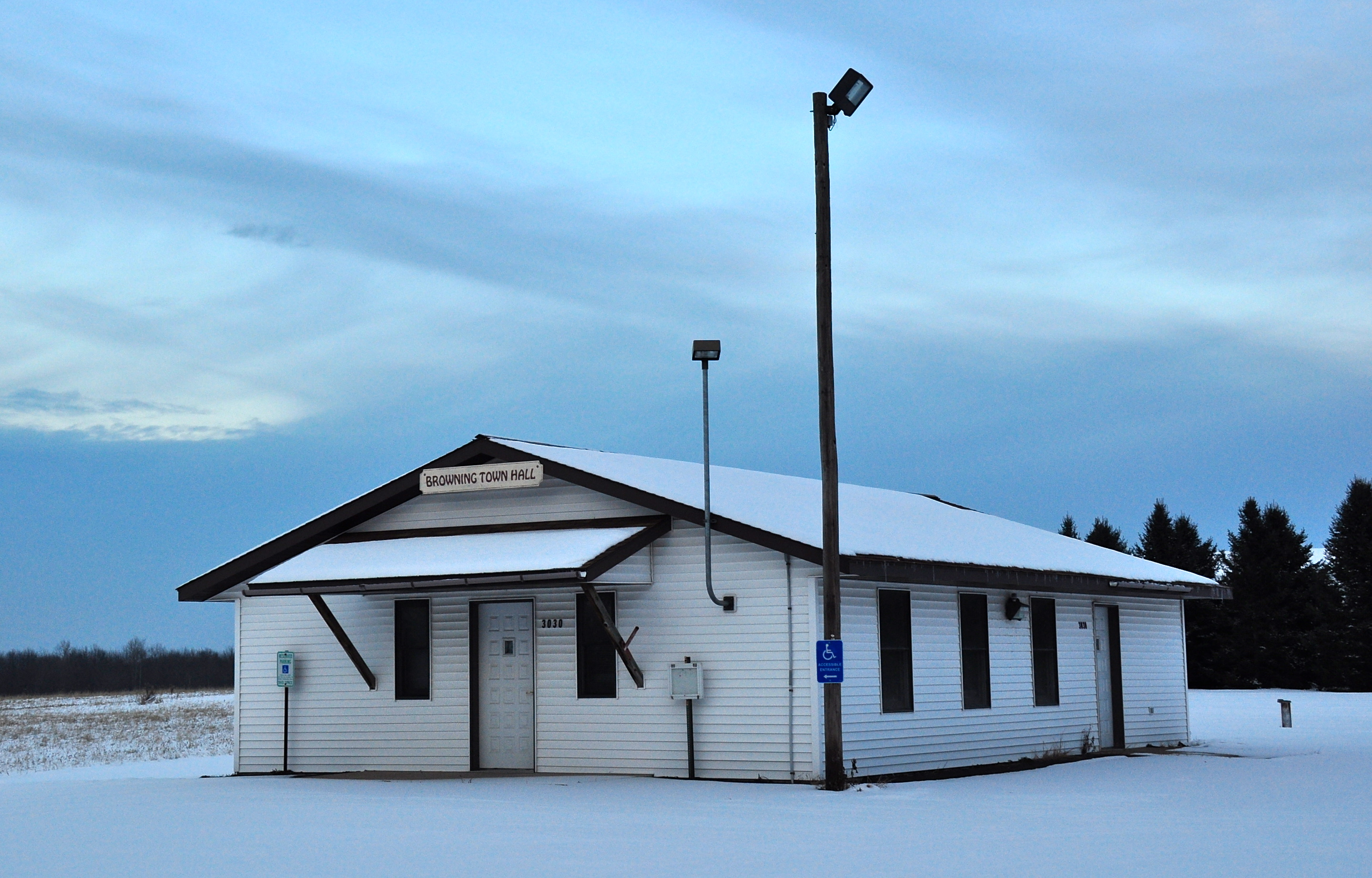
- Browning Town Hall in November 2013.

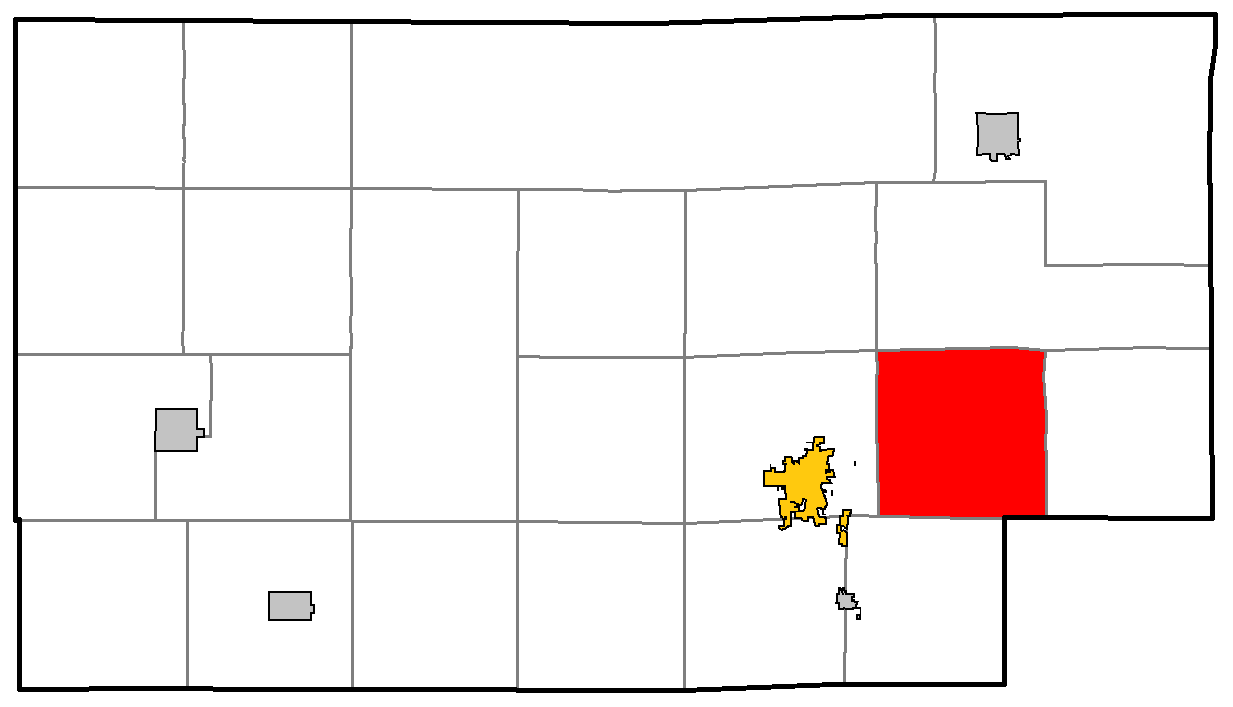
- Location of Browning, within Taylor County

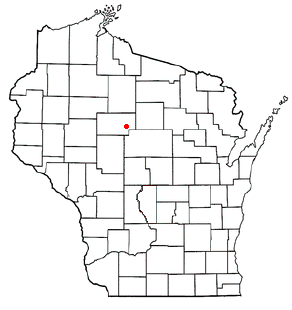
- Location of Browning, Wisconsin
- Coordinates: 45°9′59″N 90°13′57″W
- Country: United States
- State: Wisconsin
- County: Taylor

Area
  - Total: 36.5 sq mi (94.6 km^{2})
  - Land: 36.5 sq mi (94.5 km^{2})
  - Water: 0 sq mi (0.0 km^{2})
- Elevation: 1,499 ft (457 m)

Population (2020)
  - Total: 910
  - Density: 25/sq mi (9.6/km^{2})
- Time zone: UTC-6 (Central (CST))
  - Summer (DST): UTC-5 (CDT)
- Area codes: 715 & 534
- FIPS code: 55-10400
- GNIS feature ID: 1582875
- PLSS township: T31N R2E

Browning is a town in Taylor County, Wisconsin, United States. The population was 910 at the 2020 census. The unincorporated community of Gad is located in the town.

== Geography ==
According to the United States Census Bureau, the town has a total area of 36.5 square miles (94.6 km^{2}), of which 36.5 square miles (94.5 km^{2}) is land and 0.03% is water. The east and west branches of the Little Black River flow through the town.

Other than streambanks, the surface of the town is fairly level, laid down by some unknown glacier and eroded long before the last glacier which bulldozed the sharp Perkinstown terminal moraine to the north. Fragments of a low ice-marginal ridge cross the northeastern corner of the town. The soil of most of Browning is called Merrill till.

== History ==
The south and east edges of the six by six mile square that would become Browning were first surveyed in 1851 by crews working for the U.S. government. In the fall of 1861 a different crew of surveyors marked all the section corners in the township, walking through the woods and swamps, measuring with chain and compass. When done, the deputy surveyor filed this general description:

The Surface of this Township is generally level or gently rolling. Soil is principally 2nd Rate Timber Hemlock Birch Sugar White Pine Spruce and Fir and it is well watered by numerous Small Streams of pure water.

Around 1873, the Wisconsin Central Railroad built its line up through the forest just west of what would become Browning, through Medford heading for Ashland. This opened up the nearby lands to settlers. To finance this undertaking, the railroad was granted half the land for eighteen miles on either side of the track laid - generally the odd-numbered sections.

An 1880 map of this area shows early roads spanning the six-miles square that would become Browning. One follows the course of modern Highway 64 from west to east.

When Taylor County was formed in 1875, the six-mile square that would become Browning was part of a larger Town of Medford, which spanned the county east to west. In 1895 the town of Browning was split out on its own.

A map from around 1900 shows settlers' homesteads dotted along the road that would become highway 64, along another road following the course of the future County O that spanned the south edge of the town, and along some roads that connected the two. The north half of the town had no roads except for 2.5 miles around what is now Frey Lane. On that Frey Lane corner, a sawmill, a rural school, and "Lynch P.O." were marked. On the road that would become 64 were a church, another rural school, and a sawmill where the road crossed the east fork of the Black. Another rural school was on what would become Hall Drive. Large chunks of the town were still unsettled, with the Wisconsin Central still holding large parts of some odd-numbered sections. Other large land-holders are Davis & Starr (the mill at Little Black), P.A. Merino, F.J. Witten, and E.F. Browning. One logging dam impounded the west branch of the Black and another the east.

The 1911 plat map shows the roads extended, with more settlers along them. By then a road followed the course of modern Grahl Road through the center of Browning, with a sawmill and a rural school added at the center of the township. A town hall was added where modern Hall Drive crosses highway 64. Some large parcels still remained in the north and east, with Stouton L.I. Co., Medford Manufacturing Co, H & L Keifer, and Rib River Land Co. some of the largest landholders.

== Demographics ==
As of the census of 2000, there were 850 people, 298 households, and 246 families residing in the town. The population density was 23.3 people per square mile (9.0/km^{2}). There were 313 housing units at an average density of 8.6 per square mile (3.3/km^{2}). The racial makeup of the town was 98.47% White, 0.12% Asian, 1.18% from other races, and 0.24% from two or more races. Hispanic or Latino of any race were 2.59% of the population.

There were 298 households, out of which 40.9% had children under the age of 18 living with them, 71.8% were married couples living together, 5.0% had a female householder with no husband present, and 17.4% were non-families. 12.1% of all households were made up of individuals, and 4.4% had someone living alone who was 65 years of age or older. The average household size was 2.85 and the average family size was 3.10.

In the town, the population was spread out, with 28.9% under the age of 18, 8.7% from 18 to 24, 32.8% from 25 to 44, 20.9% from 45 to 64, and 8.6% who were 65 years of age or older. The median age was 35 years. For every 100 females, there were 115.7 males. For every 100 females age 18 and over, there were 108.3 males.

The median income for a household in the town was $45,917, and the median income for a family was $46,833. Males had a median income of $28,950 versus $21,250 for females. The per capita income for the town was $18,687. About 4.6% of families and 5.9% of the population were below the poverty line, including 7.8% of those under age 18 and 7.5% of those age 65 or over.

== See also ==
- List of towns in Wisconsin
