= Solvent Yellow 7 =

Chemical compound

Names
- Preferred IUPAC name 4-(Phenyldiazenyl)phenol
- Other names 4-Hydroxyazobenzene; Solvent Yellow 7 Simpsol Yellow

Identifiers
| CAS Number | 1689-82-3 |
| 3D model (JSmol) | Interactive image |
| ChEBI | CHEBI:82475 |
| ChEMBL | ChEMBL1525953 |
| ChemSpider | 10296254 |
| ECHA InfoCard | 100.015.346 |
| EC Number | 216-880-6 |
| KEGG | C19433 |
| PubChem CID | 15529 |
| UNII | VX4306NSH1 |
| CompTox Dashboard (EPA) | DTXSID70942923 DTXSID3022160, DTXSID70942923 |
- InChI: InChI=1S/C12H10N2O/c15-12-8-6-11(7-9-12)14-13-10-4-2-1-3-5-10/h1-9,15H Key: BEYOBVMPDRKTNR-UHFFFAOYSA-N; InChI=1S/C12H10N2O/c15-12-8-6-11(7-9-12)14-13-10-4-2-1-3-5-10/h1-9,15H
- SMILES: C1=CC=C(C=C1)N=NC2=CC=C(C=C2)O

Properties
| Chemical formula | C_{12}H_{10}N_{2}O |
| Molar mass | 198.225 g·mol^{−1} |
| Appearance | An orange solid |
| Melting point | 155 °C (311 °F; 428 K) |
| Solubility in water | Slightly soluble in hot water |
| Solubility in other solvents | Soluble in ethanol, acetone |
| Acidity (pK_{a}) | 8.2 (from the hydroxyl group) |

Hazards
- Occupational safety and health (OHS/OSH)
| Main hazards | Irritant |

Related compounds
| Related compounds | Benzenediazonium chloride |
- Except where otherwise noted, data are given for materials in their standard state (at 25 °C [77 °F], 100 kPa). Infobox references

Solvent Yellow 7 is an aromatic organic molecule and a common azo dye with a formula of C_{6}H_{5}N_{2}C_{6}H_{4}OH. It has a phenolic hydroxyl and an azo group in the same molecule.

== Synthesis ==
Like most azobenzenes, Solvent Yellow 7 can be synthesized by the reaction of the phenyldiazonium salt with phenol. The optimal pH value for this azo coupling is 8.5-10. The reaction is carried out in water, since sodium chloride (or potassium chloride) formed in the reaction is soluble in water, while the product precipitates.

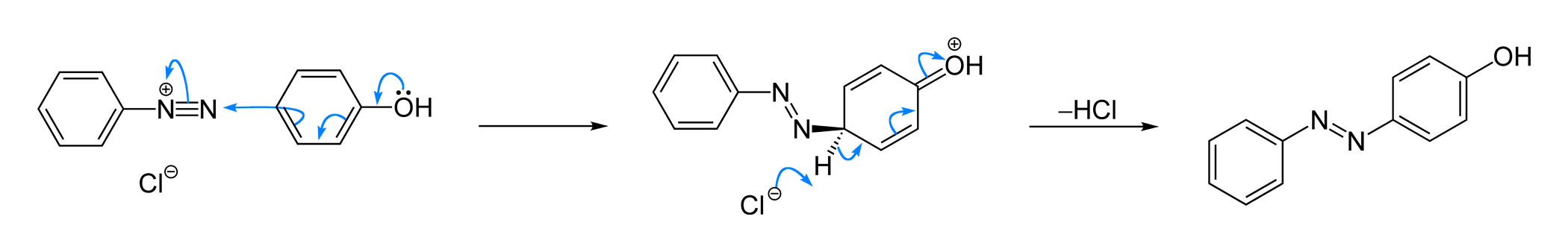

As azo dyes are not usually water soluble, the effect of various solvents on them has been studied analytically, and likewise analytical methods and calculations for the color concentration developed.

== Further reactions ==
The molecule can be further reacted including with bromine, and other halogens. Other reactions include nitration. The reactivity with Grignard reagents has also been studied.

== Toxicology ==
The toxicology has been extensively studied, including IARC studies. There have been other extensive reviews.

== See also ==
- Benzenediazonium chloride
- Azo compound
- Solvent Yellow 1

== External Websites ==
- Santa Cruz Biotechnology Safety Data Sheet
