= Basic Red 18 =

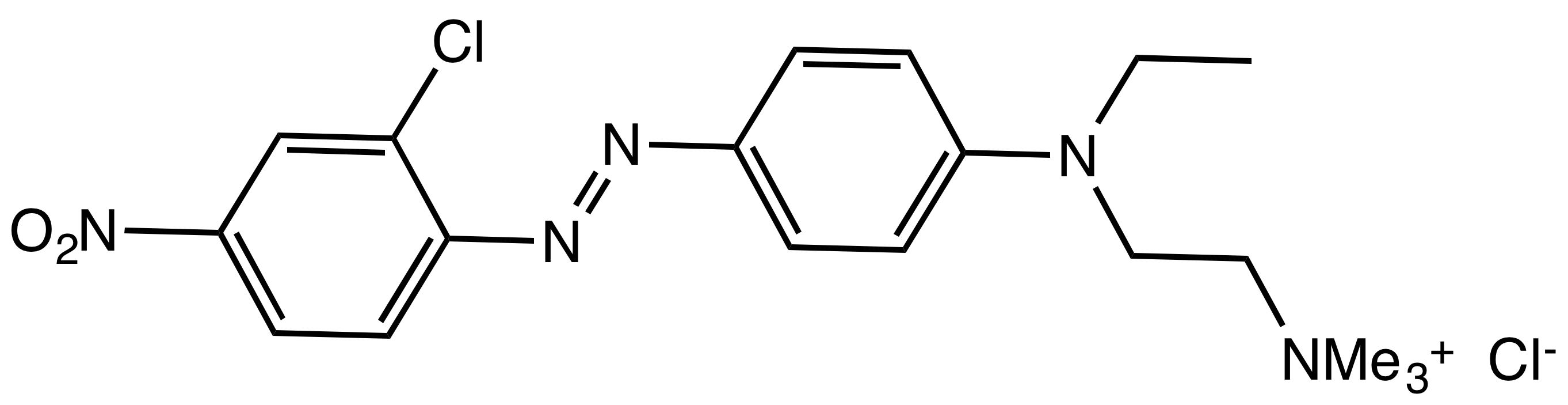

Names
- Other names Aizen Cathilon Red GTLH, Astrazon Red GTL

Identifiers
CAS Number	25198-22-5
3D model (JSmol)	Interactive image
ChemSpider	21160230
EC Number	237-946-0
PubChem CID	26457
UNII	H5KZY0428H
CompTox Dashboard (EPA)	DTXSID50885288
- InChI: InChI=1S/C19H25ClN5O2/c1-5-23(12-13-25(2,3)4)16-8-6-15(7-9-16)21-22-19-11-10-17(24(26)27)14-18(19)20/h6-11,14H,5,12-13H2,1-4H3/q+1 Key: TZXATTMVGZDPHM-UHFFFAOYSA-N
- SMILES: CCN(CC[N+](C)(C)C)C1=CC=C(C=C1)N=NC2=C(C=C(C=C2)[N+](=O)[O-])Cl

Properties
Chemical formula	C_{19}H_{25}Cl_{2}N_{5}O_{2}
Molar mass	426.34 g·mol^{−1}
Appearance	dark red solid
Melting point	45.5–46.5 °C (113.9–115.7 °F; 318.6–319.6 K)

Hazards
- GHS labelling
Pictograms	(GHS05: Corrosive) (GHS07: Exclamation mark)
Signal word	Danger
Hazard statements	H302, H318, H412
Precautionary statements	P264, P270, P273, P280, P301+P312, P305+P351+P338, P310, P330, P501
- Except where otherwise noted, data are given for materials in their standard state (at 25 °C [77 °F], 100 kPa). Infobox references

Basic Red 18 is a cationic azo dye used for coloring textiles. The chromophore is the cation, which contains many functional groups, but most prominently the quaternary ammonium center.

It is produced by azo coupling of 2-chloro-4-nitrophenyldiazonium cation with the quaternary ammonium salt derived from N-ethyl-N-(2-chloroethyl)aniline and trimethylamine.

Like many dyes, methods for the removal of Basic Red 18 from waste streams has received much attention.
