= Glycoazodyes =

Glycoazodyes (or GADs) are a family of "naturalised" synthetic dyes, so called because they are the conjugation of common commercial azo dyes with sugar through a "linker". This principle is summarised in the scheme below.

== Generations, Structure, and Synthesis ==
=== First-generation ===
The first-generation of Glycoazodyes was first reported in 2007. These Glycoazodyes use a diester linker, specifically a succinyl bridge. An ester group bonds the sugar to an n-alkane spacer, and the spacer bonds to the dye through another ester group.

==== Synthesis ====
First-generation Glycoazodyes are synthesized using glucose, galactose or lactose as the sugar group. The point of esterification is controlled by selectively protecting alcohol groups on the sugar, or by choosing an azo dye with a different alcohol group position. The dye or the sugar group can be succinylated by reacting a free alcohol group with succinic anhydride. The resulting hemisuccinate then reacts with a free alcohol group on the dye or the sugar. The condensation product is then deprotected.

=== Second-generation ===
The second-generation of Glycoazodyes was first reported in 2008. These Glycoazodyes use an etherel linker. An ether group bonds the sugar and the dye to an n-alkane spacer, and the spacer bonds to the dye through another ether group. Like first-generation Glycoazodyes, second-generation Glycoazodyes use glucose, galactose or lactose as the sugar group.

==== Synthesis ====
Like first-generation Glycoazodyes, second-generation Glycoazodyes are synthesized using a glucose, galactose, or lactose sugar group. The point of the ether bond is controlled by selectively protecting alcohol groups on the sugar, or by choosing an azo dye with a different alcohol group position. An unprotected alcohol group of either the sugar or the dye is reacted with an n-carbon, terminal dibromoalkane in a solution of potassium hydroxide and 18-crown-6 ether, using non-anhydrous tetrahydrofuran as the solvent. The potassium hydroxide produces an alkoxide ion from the alcohol while the 18-crown-6 ether acts as a phase-transfer agent. The reaction proceeds through a classic SN-2 nucleophilic substitution. A terminal Bromo group is eliminated, and a bond is formed between the oxygen of the alcohol and the carbon of the alkane. An ether is produced between the n-carbon linker and the sugar or the dye. At this stage, the terminal Bromo group that remains may react under the same conditions with the free alcohol of a corresponding sugar or dye. The condensation product is then deprotected.

=== Third-generation ===
The third-generation of Glycoazodyes was first reported in 2015. These Glycoazodyes use an amido-ester linker. An amide group bonds the sugar to an n-alkane spacer, and the spacer is bonded to the dye through an ester group.

==== Synthesis ====
Third-generation Glycoazodyes are synthesized using amino sugars such as 6-amino-6-deoxy-D-galactose or 6' amino-6'-deoxylactose. The point of the amide bond is controlled by protecting the alcohol groups on the sugar and allowing the free amine to react. The point of the ester group is controlled by choosing a azo dye with a different alcohol group position. Either the dye or the sugar is reacted with succinic anhydride. This forms an amide group with the sugar or an ester group with the dye. The free carboxylic acid may then react with the alcohol group or amine group on the corresponding dye or sugar. The condensation product is then deprotected.

== Properties ==
A variety of fabrics such as wool, silk, nylon, polyester, polyacrylic, polyacetate, and polyurethane may be dyed with Glycoazodyes under moderate temperatures and pressures in aqueous solutions. First-generation Glycoazodyes dye cotton poorly. However, second-generation Glycoazodyes dye cotton effectively. Wool dyed with Glycoazodyes shows good fastness when exposed to the ISO 105-C06 washing and ISO 105 X12 rubbing tests.

Glycoazodyes vary in their water solubility. They may be soluble in cold to warm water and may dissolve after stirring or upon addition.

Minor variations in absorption spectra occur when Glycoazodye solutions are prepared, using water, acetone, or methanol solvents. Converting a parent azo dye to a Glycoazodye may produce a small hypsochromic shift in the absorption spectra.

== Environmental impact ==
Several properties may make Glycoazodyes an environmentally friendly alternative to traditional synthetic dyes. The increased hydrophilicity of Glycoazodyes allows for the elimination of surfactants, mordants, and salts, during the dyeing process and permits the aqueous dying of a variety of textiles at moderate temperatures and pressures. The unique structure may also allow for the treatment of textile effluent through biological means. Fusarium oxysporum efficiently decolourizes the first-generation Glycoazodye 4-{N,N-Bis[2-(D-galactopyranos-6-yloxy)ethyl]-amino}azobenzene. Various other Ascomycota fungi show a similar potential to decolourise Glycoazodyes, but to a lesser extent. Detoxification has been measured, using the Daphnia magna acute toxicity test, showing a 92% dye detoxification after 6 days. This detoxification method produces low concentrations of nitrobenzene, aniline, and nitrosobenzene.
