= Bern, Wisconsin =

- Town
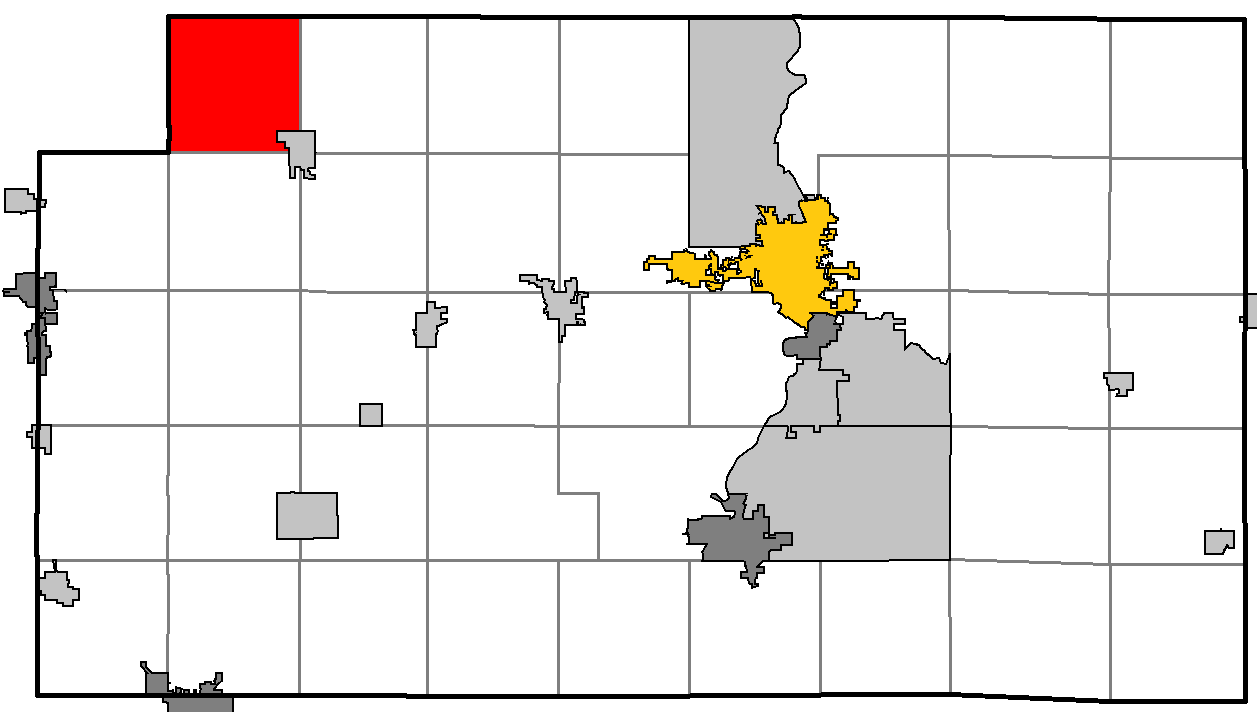
- Location of Bern, Marathon County

- Location of Marathon County, Wisconsin
- Coordinates: 45°4′23″N 90°7′48″W
- Country: United States
- State: Wisconsin
- County: Marathon
- Named for: Bavaria, Germany

Area
  - Total: 34.1 sq mi (88.3 km^{2})
  - Land: 34.1 sq mi (88.3 km^{2})
  - Water: 0 sq mi (0.0 km^{2})
- Elevation: 1,434 ft (437 m)

Population (2020)
  - Total: 614
  - Density: 18.0/sq mi (6.95/km^{2})
- Time zone: UTC-6 (Central (CST))
  - Summer (DST): UTC-5 (CDT)
- Area codes: 715 & 534
- FIPS code: 55-07000
- GNIS feature ID: 1582802

Bern is a town in Marathon County, Wisconsin, United States. It is part of the Wausau, Wisconsin Metropolitan Statistical Area. The population was 614 at the 2020 census. The unincorporated community of Gad is located partially in the town.

== Geography ==
According to the United States Census Bureau, the town has a total area of 34.1 square miles (88.3 km^{2}), of which 34.1 square miles (88.3 km^{2}) is land and 0.03% is water. The town name is a phonetically analogous rendering of German "Bayern", referring to Bavaria.

== Demographics ==
At the 2000 census there were 562 people, 170 households, and 148 families living in the town. The population density was 16.5 people per square mile (6.4/km^{2}). There were 180 housing units at an average density of 5.3 per square mile (2.0/km^{2}). The racial makeup of the town was 99.82% White, and 0.18% from two or more races. Hispanic or Latino of any race were 0.53%.

Of the 170 households 38.8% had children under the age of 18 living with them, 78.8% were married couples living together, 4.1% had a female householder with no husband present, and 12.4% were non-families. 8.2% of households were one person and 4.1% were one person aged 65 or older. The average household size was 3.31 and the average family size was 3.54.

The age distribution was 31.5% under the age of 18, 9.8% from 18 to 24, 25.6% from 25 to 44, 20.6% from 45 to 64, and 12.5% 65 or older. The median age was 33 years. For every 100 females, there were 106.6 males. For every 100 females age 18 and over, there were 108.1 males.

The median household income was $50,000 and the median family income was $51,500. Males had a median income of $30,357 versus $21,442 for females. The per capita income for the town was $15,854. About 7.7% of families and 11.2% of the population were below the poverty line, including 18.2% of those under age 18 and 15.7% of those age 65 or over.
