= Naphthol Red =

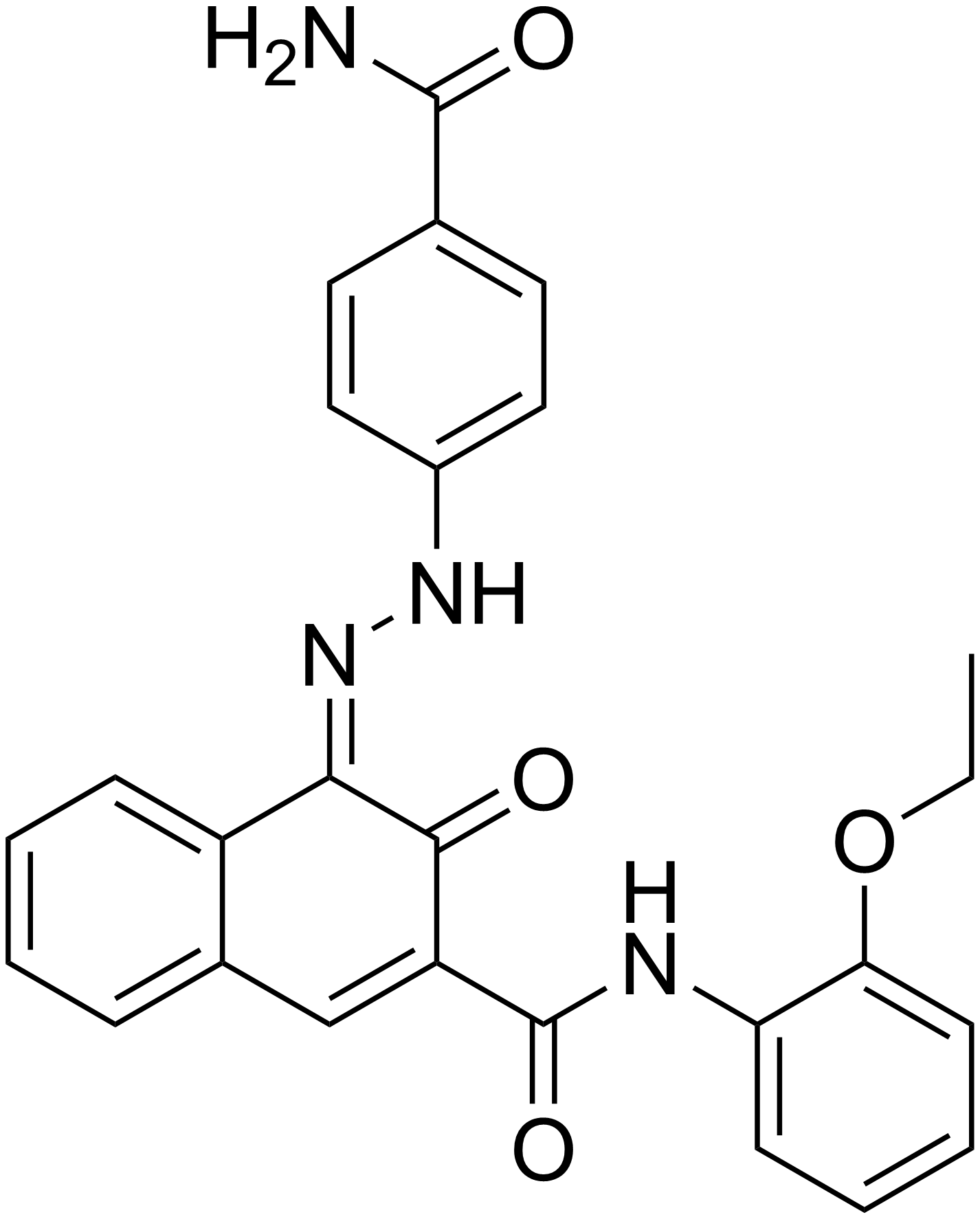

Names
- IUPAC name 4-(2-(4-carbamoylphenyl)hydrazono)-N-(2-ethoxyphenyl)-3-oxo-3,4-dihydronaphthalene-2-carboxamide
- Other names C.I. 12475; C.I. Pigment Red 170

Identifiers
CAS Number	2786-76-7
3D model (JSmol)	Interactive image
ChemSpider	4514376
ECHA InfoCard	100.018.645
PubChem CID	5359812
UNII	54O6PK8790
CompTox Dashboard (EPA)	DTXSID7029243
- InChI: InChI=1S/C26H22N4O4/c1-2-34-22-10-6-5-9-21(22)28-26(33)20-15-17-7-3-4-8-19(17)23(24(20)31)30-29-18-13-11-16(12-14-18)25(27)32/h3-15,29H,2H2,1H3,(H2,27,32)(H,28,33)/b30-23- Key: PYUYQYBDJFMFTH-WMMMYUQOSA-N
- SMILES: O=C1C(C(NC2=CC=CC=C2OCC)=O)=CC3=CC=CC=C3/C1=N/NC4=CC=C(C(N)=O)C=C4

Properties
Chemical formula	C_{26}H_{22}N_{4}O_{4}
Molar mass	454.486 g·mol^{−1}
Density	1.317 g/ml
- Except where otherwise noted, data are given for materials in their standard state (at 25 °C [77 °F], 100 kPa). verify (what is ?) Infobox references

Naphthol Red (Pigment red 170 or PR170) is an organic pigment extensively used in automotive coatings and painting.

It is produced synthetically by converting p-aminobenzamide into the corresponding diazonium compound followed by coupling with 3-hydroxy-2-naphththoic acid (2-ethoxy)anilide ("Naphtol AS-PH" dye precursor).

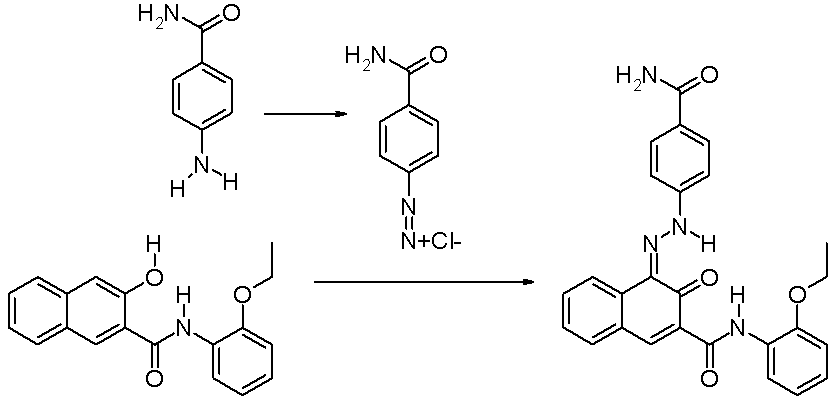

In the solid state the hydrazo tautomer forms and several crystal structures exist. In the initial α polymorph the molecules are arranged in a herringbone pattern with extensive hydrogen bonding. The φ polymorph is more dense and more stable and produced industrially by thermal treatment in water at 130°C under pressure. In this phase the molecules are planar and arranged in layers. Extensive hydrogen bonding exists within the layer but between layers the only interactions are Van der Waals forces. Dense crystal structures are preferred for pigments used in coatings because in the event of photochemical decomposition the fragments are locked in place and are able to recombine. Research shows that by replacing the ethoxy group in this compound by a methoxy group the crystal structure is less stable and in the final application and the color fades more easily. By careful selection of substituents it is possible to optimize crystal structure and improve optical properties.
