= Substantive dye =

Dye that adheres by non-ionic forces

A substantive dye or direct dye is a dye that adheres to its substrate, typically a textile, by non-ionic forces.

== Overview ==
The amount of this attraction is known as "substantivity": the higher the substantivity the greater the attraction of the dye for the fiber. Substantive dyes work best on textiles with high contents of cellulose, such as cotton.

In contrast to direct dyes, wool and leather goods are dyed by the process of ion exchange, exploiting the cationic nature of proteins near neutral pH. The development of substantive dyes helped make mordant dyes obsolete.

Substantive dyes are set in a slightly basic or neutral environment at temperatures close to boiling point. They are set by formation of aggregates of dyes within interstices of the fibres. Aggregation is enhanced by extended aromatic rings.

== Gallery ==
Representative direct dyes

Direct Blue 1

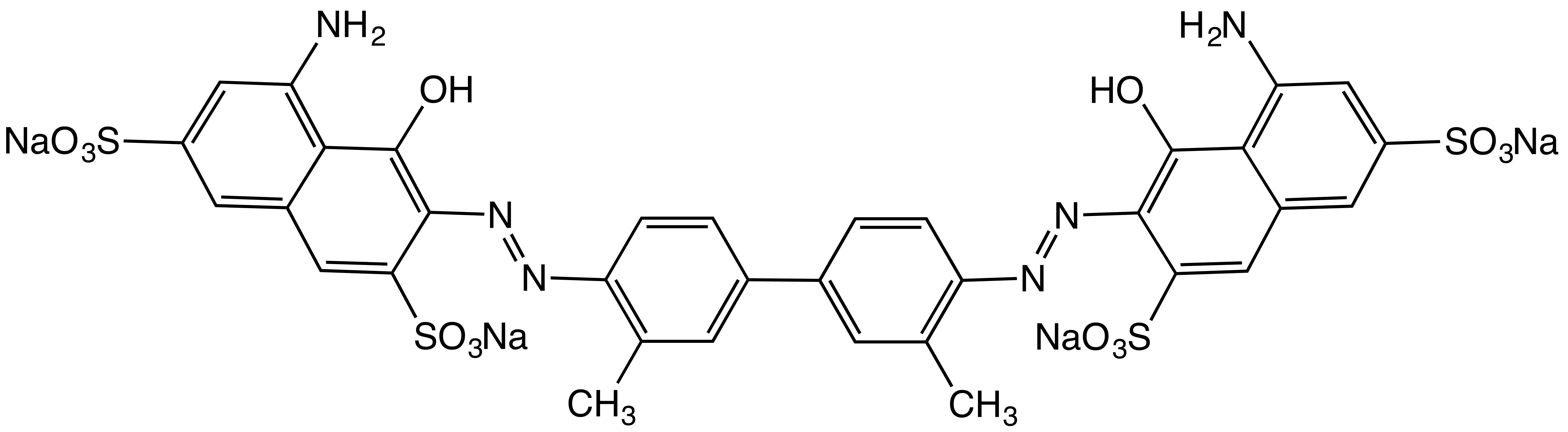
Trypan blue (Direct Blue 14), which also exhibits medicinal properties

Direct Blue 15

== See also ==
- Reactive dye
