= Gadd =

Gadd is a surname. Notable people with the surname include:

- Anthony Gadd (1917–1996), British bobsledder
- C. J. Gadd (1893–1969), British Assyriologist and curator
- Christianne Gadd (born 1971), former name of Brazilian actress Christianne Oliveira
- Eric Gadd
- Geoffrey Michael Gadd (born 1954), British-Irish microbiologist and mycologist
- Hemming Gadd (1837–1915), Swedish Army general
- Hugo Gadd (1885–1968), Swedish Army major general
- Knut Gadd (1916–1995), Swedish water polo player
- Paul Francis Gadd (born 1944), the real name of British pop singer and convicted paedophile Gary Glitter
- Renee Gadd (1908–2003), Argentine-born British film actress
- Richard Gadd (born 1989), Scottish writer, actor and comedian
- Rochelle Gadd, British actress
- Stephen Gadd (born 1964), English operatic baritone
- Steve Gadd (born 1945), American drummer
- Steve Gadd (born 1951), English vocalist of rock band Stray
- Trevor Gadd (born 1952), English athlete
- Will Gadd (born 1967), Canadian ice climber and paraglider pilot

Fictional characters:

- Elvin Gadd, fictional character
