= Disperse Orange 1 =

Chemical compound

- Chemical structure of Disperse Orange 1

Names
- Other names 4-Anilino-4'-nitroazobenzene; C.I. 11080 (Colour index numbers)

Identifiers
CAS Number	2581-69-3
3D model (JSmol)	Interactive image
ChemSpider	16477
ECHA InfoCard	100.018.141
EC Number	219-954-6
PubChem CID	17414
UNII	1592R4P97H
CompTox Dashboard (EPA)	DTXSID7062536
- InChI: InChI=1S/C18H14N4O2/c23-22(24)18-12-10-17(11-13-18)21-20-16-8-6-15(7-9-16)19-14-4-2-1-3-5-14/h1-13,19H Key: YFVXLROHJBSEDW-UHFFFAOYSA-N
- SMILES: C1=CC=C(C=C1)NC2=CC=C(C=C2)N=NC3=CC=C(C=C3)[N+](=O)[O-]

Properties
Chemical formula	C_{18}H_{14}N_{4}O_{2}
Molar mass	318.33476 g/mol
Melting point	160.0 °C (320.0 °F; 433.1 K)

Hazards
- GHS labelling
Pictograms	(GHS07: Exclamation mark)
Signal word	Warning
Hazard statements	H317
Precautionary statements	P261, P272, P280, P302+P352, P321, P333+P313, P363, P501
- Except where otherwise noted, data are given for materials in their standard state (at 25 °C [77 °F], 100 kPa). verify (what is ?) Infobox references

Disperse Orange 1, or 4-anilino-4'-nitroazobenzene, is an azo dye. Commercial samples contain approximately 25% dye by weight, with the remaining mass consisting of NaCl and other salts.

This dye is useful in conducting experiments with flash photolysis due to the isomerization effect between the trans-4A4N and cis-4A4N states that occurs during photo relaxation.
