= GADS =

GADS may refer to:

- GRAP2, GRB2-related adapter protein 2 involved in leukocyte-specific protein-tyrosine kinase signaling
- Gateway Algorithms and Data Structures
- Generating Availability Data System, US power plant information
- Gilliam Asperger's disorder scale, a diagnostic tool for Asperger syndrome
- Goose Air Defense Sector, an inactive unit of the United States Air Force
- Gate Assignment Display System, a decision support system for managing airport ground operations
- George Anthony Devolder Santos (born 1988), American convicted fraudster and former politician
