= Gad, Wisconsin =

Unincorporated community in Wisconsin, United States

- Unincorporated community
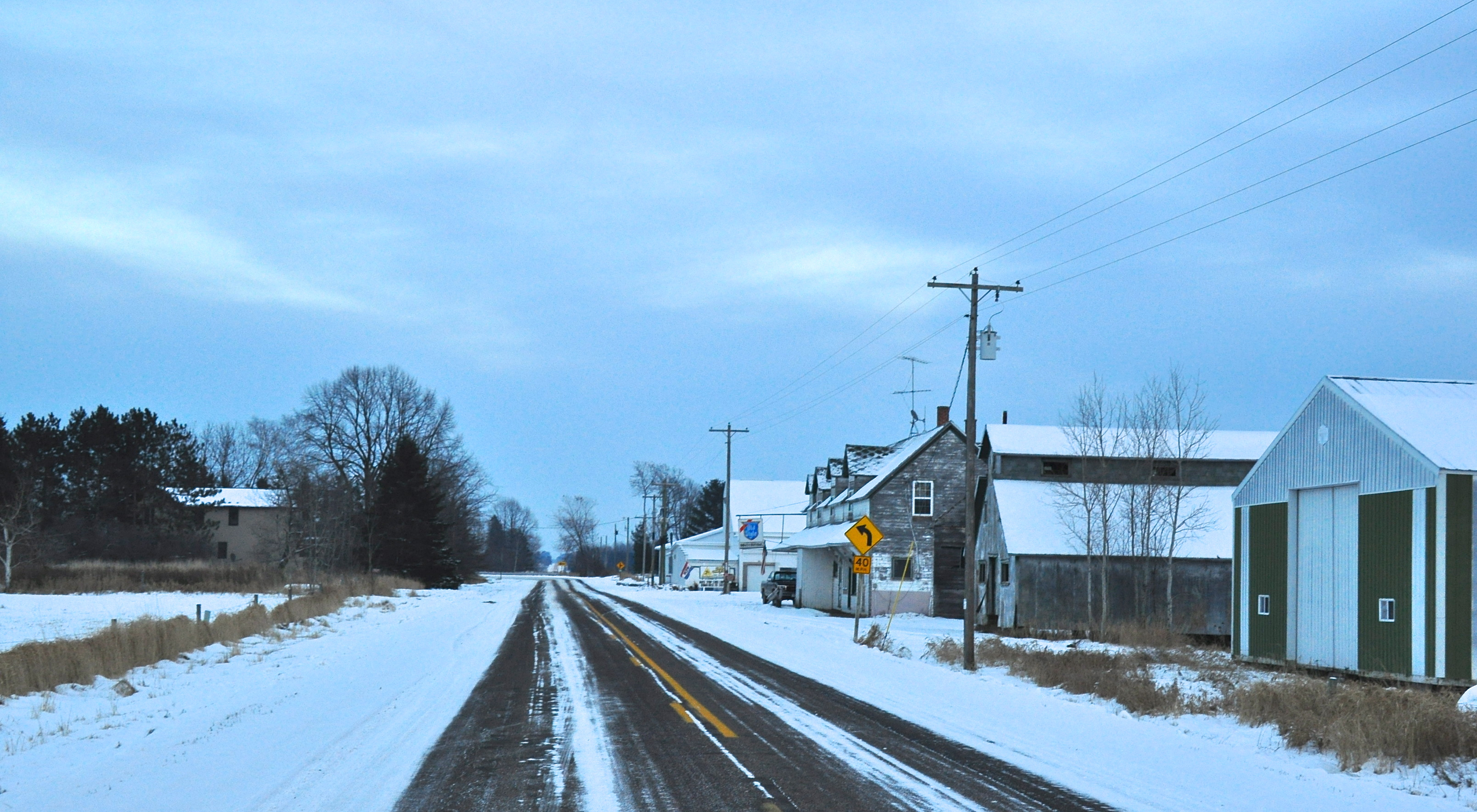
- The community of Gad in November 2013.

- Location within Wisconsin Location within the United States
- Coordinates: 45°07′15″N 90°11′20″W
- Country: United States
- State: Wisconsin
- Counties: Marathon, Taylor
- Town: Bern, Browning
- Elevation: 1,511 ft (461 m)
- Time zone: UTC-6 (Central (CST))
  - Summer (DST): UTC-5 (CDT)
- Area codes: 715 & 534

Gad is an unincorporated community located in Marathon and Taylor Counties, Wisconsin, United States. The Marathon County portion of Gad is in the town of Bern, while the Taylor County portion is in the town of Browning. Gad is located along County Highway C, 7.5 miles (12.1 km) east-southeast of Medford. The community once had a school called the Gad School; it is now part of the Medford Area School District.
