= Direct Blue 1 =

Names
- IUPAC name tetrasodium (6E)-4-amino-6-[[4-[4-[N′-(8-amino-1-oxo-5,7-disulfonato-2-naphthylidene)hydrazino]-3-methoxy-phenyl]-2-methoxy-phenyl]hydrazono]-5-oxo-naphthalene-1,3-disulfonate
- Other names Airedale Blue FFD, Amanil Sky Blue 6B, Amanil Sky Blue FF, Atlantic Resin Fast Blue

Identifiers
CAS Number	2610-05-1
3D model (JSmol)	Interactive image
ChemSpider	4514372
ECHA InfoCard	100.018.207
PubChem CID	5359775
UNII	8NN34MAQ6H
CompTox Dashboard (EPA)	DTXSID1025190
- InChI: InChI=1S/C34H28N6O16S4.4Na/c1-55-23-11-15(3-7-19(23)37-39-21-9-5-17-25(57(43,44)45)13-27(59(49,50)51)31(35)29(17)33(21)41)16-4-8-20(24(12-16)56-2)38-40-22-10-6-18-26(58(46,47)48)14-28(60(52,53)54)32(36)30(18)34(22)42;;;;/h3-14,37-38H,35-36H2,1-2H3,(H,43,44,45)(H,46,47,48)(H,49,50,51)(H,52,53,54);;;;/q;4*+1/p-4/b39-21-,40-22+;;;; Key: UPKAWFACSJWKND-ZXFFUEEESA-J
- SMILES: [Na+].[Na+].[Na+].[Na+].[O-]S(=O)(=O)c6c5\C=C/C(=N/Nc1ccc(cc1OC)c2ccc(c(OC)c2)N/N=C4\C=C/c3c(cc(c(N)c3C4=O)S([O-])(=O)=O)S([O-])(=O)=O)C(=O)c5c(N)c(c6)S([O-])(=O)=O

Properties
Chemical formula	C_{34}H_{24}N_{6}Na_{4}O_{16}S_{4}
Molar mass	992.804
Appearance	Amorphous, fine blue powder.

Hazards
- Occupational safety and health (OHS/OSH)
Main hazards	Xn
- Except where otherwise noted, data are given for materials in their standard state (at 25 °C [77 °F], 100 kPa). verify (what is ?) Infobox references

Direct Blue 1 is an organic compound that is one of many azo dyes. This salt is used as a substantive dye for textiles with high contents of cellulose, i.e. cotton. It is prepared by the azo coupling of the aminonaphthalene and diazotized derivative of o-dianisidine.
