= Azo compound =

Organic compounds with a diazenyl group (–N=N–)

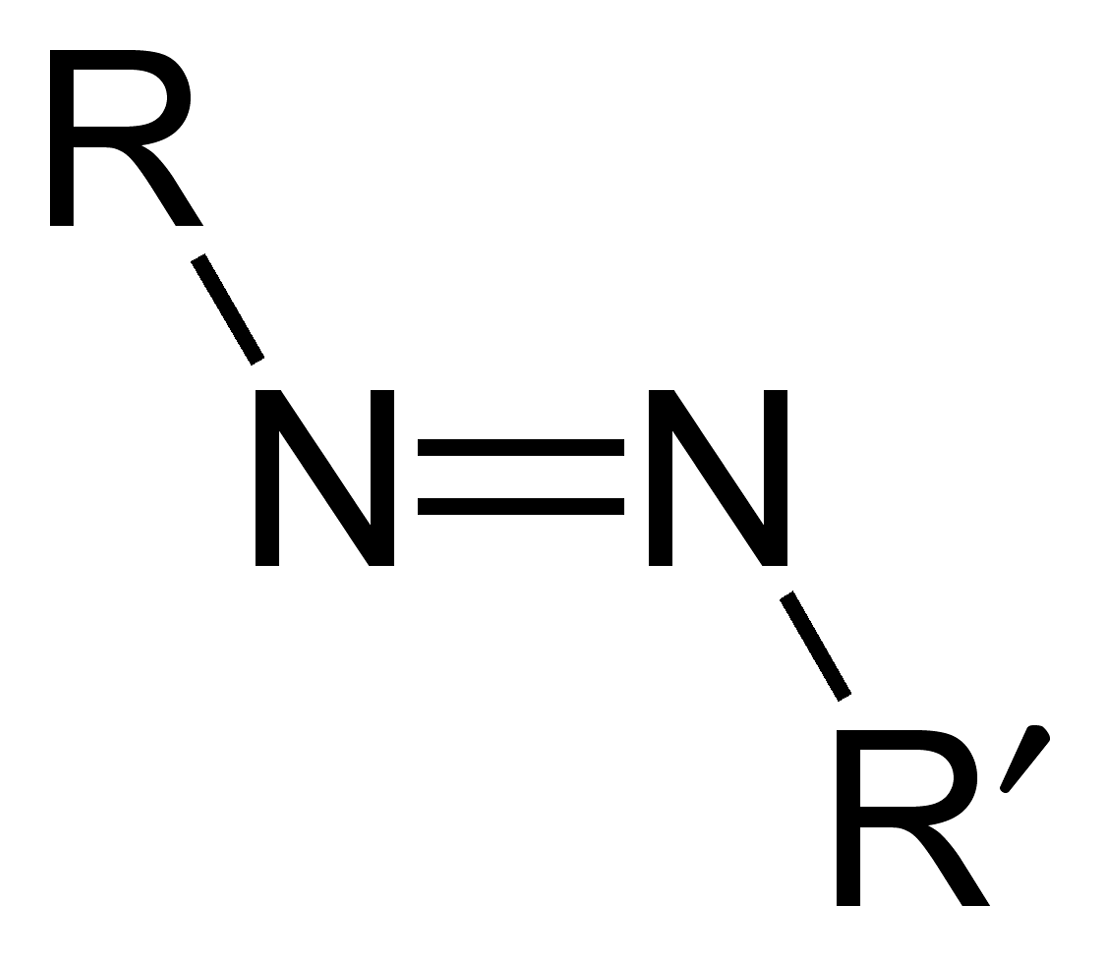
Diazenyl group of azo compounds

Azo compounds are organic compounds bearing the functional group diazenyl (R−N=N−R′, in which N is nitrogen and R and R′ can be either aryl or alkyl groups).

IUPAC defines azo compounds as: "Derivatives of diazene (diimide), HN=NH, wherein both hydrogens are substituted by hydrocarbyl groups, e.g. PhN=NPh azobenzene or diphenyldiazene.", where Ph stands for phenyl group. The more stable derivatives contain two aryl groups. The N=N group is called an azo group (from French azote 'nitrogen', from Ancient Greek ἀ- (a-) 'not' and ζωή (zōē) 'life').

Many textile and leather articles are dyed with azo dyes and pigments.

== Aryl azo compounds ==
Phenazopyridine, an aryl azo compound, is used to treat urinary tract infections

An orange azo dye Solvent Yellow 7

Aryl azo compounds are usually stable, crystalline species. Azobenzene is the prototypical aromatic azo compound. It exists mainly as the trans isomer, but upon illumination, converts to the cis isomer.

Aromatic azo compounds can be synthesized by azo coupling, which entails an electrophilic substitution reaction where an aryl diazonium cation is attacked by another aryl ring, especially those substituted with electron-donating groups:

ArN^{+}_{2} + Ar'H → ArN=NAr' + H^{+}

Since diazonium salts are often unstable near room temperature, the azo coupling reactions are typically conducted near 0 °C.

The oxidation of hydrazines (R−NH−NH−R′) also gives azo compounds. In the opposite direction, condensation of nitroaromatics with anilines gives an azoxy intermediate reducible to the diazo:

ArNO_{2} + Ar'NH_{2} → ArN(O)=NAr' + H_{2}O
ArN(O)=NAr' + C_{6}H_{12}O_{6} → ArN=NAr' + C_{6}H_{10}O_{6} + H_{2}O

As a consequence of π-delocalization, aryl azo compounds have vivid colors, especially reds, oranges, and yellows. Therefore, they are used as dyes, and are commonly known as azo dyes, an example of which is Disperse Orange 1. Some azo compounds, e.g., methyl orange, are used as acid-base indicators due to the different colors of their acid and salt forms. Most DVD-R/+R and some CD-R discs use blue azo dye as the recording layer. The commercial success of azo dyes motivated the development of azo compounds in general.

== Alkyl azo compounds ==
Aliphatic azo compounds (R and/or R′ = aliphatic) are less commonly encountered than the aryl azo compounds. A commercially important alkyl azo compound is azobisisobutyronitrile (AIBN), which is widely used as an initiator in free-radical polymerizations and other radical-induced reactions. It achieves this initiation by decomposition, eliminating a molecule of nitrogen gas to form two 2-cyanoprop-2-yl radicals:

For instance a mixture of styrene and maleic anhydride in toluene will react if heated, forming the copolymer upon addition of AIBN.

A simple dialkyl diazo compound is diethyldiazene, CH_{3}CH_{2}−N=N−CH_{2}CH_{3}, which can be synthesized through a variant of the Ramberg–Bäcklund reaction. Because of their instability, aliphatic azo compounds pose the risk of explosion.

AIBN is produced by converting acetone cyanohydrin to the hydrazine derivative followed by oxidation:

2 (CH_{3})_{2}C(CN)OH + N_{2}H_{4} → [(CH_{3})_{2}C(CN)]_{2}N_{2}H_{2} + 2 H_{2}O
[(CH_{3})_{2}C(CN)]_{2}N_{2}H_{2} + Cl_{2} → [(CH_{3})_{2}C(CN)]_{2}N_{2} + 2 HCl

== Safety and regulation ==
Many azo pigments are non-toxic, although some, such as dinitroaniline orange, ortho-nitroaniline orange, or pigment orange 1, 2, and 5 have been found to be mutagenic. Likewise, several case studies have linked azo pigments with basal cell carcinoma.

=== European regulation ===
Certain azo dyes can break down under reductive conditions to release any of a group of defined aromatic amines. Consumer goods which contain listed aromatic amines originating from azo dyes were prohibited from manufacture and sale in European Union countries in September 2003. As only a small number of dyes contained an equally small number of amines, relatively few products were affected.

== See also ==
- Azo coupling
- Disodium 4,4′-dinitrostilbene-2,2′-disulfonate – common coupling partner in azo dye synthesis
