= Azo coupling =

Chemical reaction that joins diazonium (R–N≡N) to an aromatic compound

In organic chemistry, an azo coupling is a reaction between a diazonium compound (R−N≡N^{+}) and another aromatic compound that produces an azo compound (R−N=N−R’). In this electrophilic aromatic substitution reaction, the aryldiazonium cation is the electrophile, and the activated carbon (usually from an arene, which is called coupling agent), serves as a nucleophile. Classical coupling agents are phenols and naphthols. Usually the diazonium reagent attacks at the para position of the coupling agent. When the para position is occupied, coupling occurs at a ortho position, albeit at a slower rate.

== Uses of the reaction ==
Aromatic azo compounds tend to be brightly colored due to their extended conjugated systems. Many are useful dyes (see azo dye). Important azo dyes include methyl red and pigment red 170.

Azo printing exploits this reaction as well. In this case, the diazonium ion is degraded by light, leaving a latent image in undegraded diazonium salt which is made to react with a phenol, producing a colored image: the blueprint.

Prontosil, the first sulfa drug, was once produced by azo coupling. The azo compound is a prodrug that is activated in-vivo to produce the sufanilamide.

The reaction is also used in the Pauly reaction test to detect tyrosine or histidine residues in proteins.

Additionally, through the azo coupling reaction between the aromatic diazonium ion and aromatic amino acid residues, this reaction can also be used to form or to modify proteins such as tRNA synthetase.

== Examples of azo C-coupling reactions ==
Illustrative is the reaction of phenol with benzenediazonium chloride to give a Solvent Yellow 7, a yellow-orange azo compound. The reaction is faster at high pH. Many other azo dyes have been prepared by similarly. Several procedures have been described in detail.

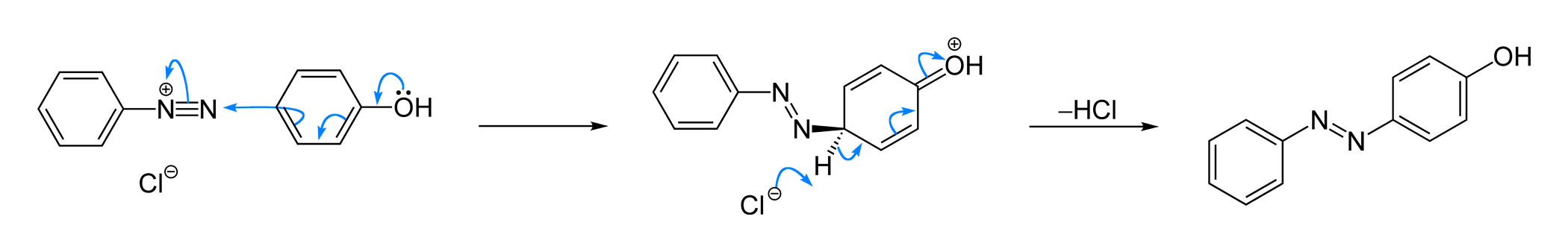

Naphthols are used as coupling agents. One example is the synthesis of the dye organol brown (4) from aniline (1) and 1-naphthol (3):

Similarly, β-naphthol couples with phenyldiazonium electrophile to produce an intense orange-red dye.

Besides activated aromatic coupling agents, other nucleophilic carbons also couple with diazonium salts as illustrated by the synthesis of azo pigments.

== Examples of azo N-coupling reactions ==
In alkaline media, diazonium salt can react with most primary and secondary amines, which exist as a free base to produce triazene. This chemical reaction is called azo N-coupling, or the synthesis of azoamines.

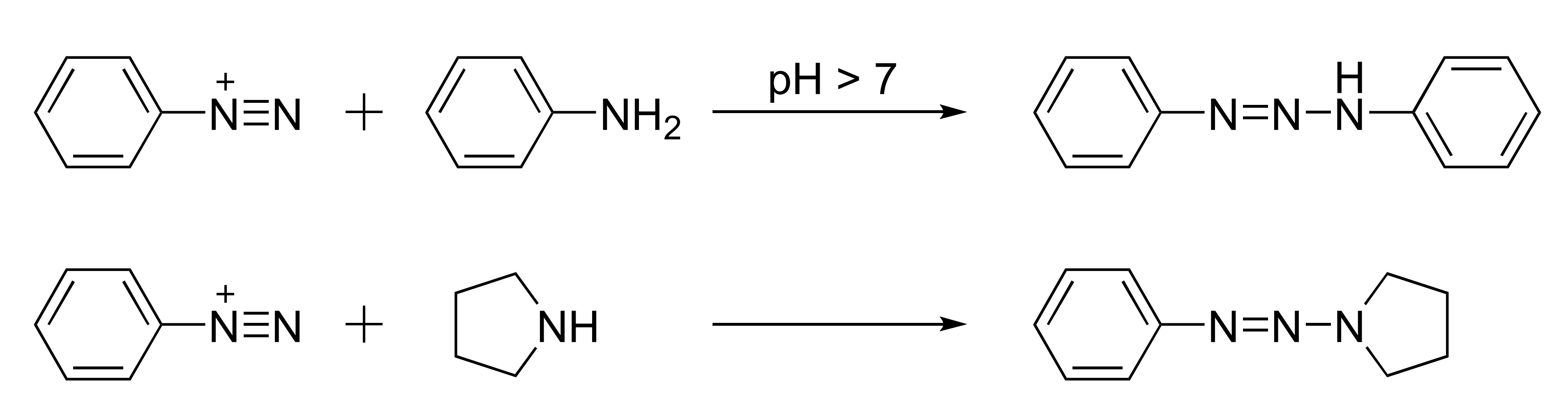
Azo N-coupling under basic condition

The dye called aniline yellow is produced by the reaction of aniline and a diazonium salt. In this case the C- and N-coupling compete.
