= Azo dye =

Class of organic compounds used as dye

Chemical structure of Solvent Yellow 7, an orange colored azo dye.

Azo dyes are organic compounds bearing the functional group R−N=N−R′, in which R and R′ are usually aryl and substituted aryl groups. They are a commercially important family of azo compounds, i.e. compounds containing the C−N=N−C linkage. Azo dyes are synthetic dyes and do not occur naturally. Azo dyes may be classified by the number of azo groups they contain, most commonly either one group (monoazo dyes) or two groups (disazo dyes), though trisazo dyes with three groups and polyazo dyes with four or more groups are also known. Azo dyes comprise 60–70% of all dyes used in food and textile industries. Azo dyes are widely used to treat textiles, leather articles, and some foods. Chemically related derivatives of azo dyes include azo pigments, which are insoluble in water and other solvents.

== Classes ==
Many kinds of azo dyes are known, and several classification systems exist. Some classes include disperse dyes, metal-complex dyes, reactive dyes, and substantive dyes. Also called direct dyes, substantive dyes are employed for cellulose-based textiles, which includes cotton. The dyes bind to the textile by non-electrostatic forces. In another classification, azo dyes can be classified according to the number of azo groups.

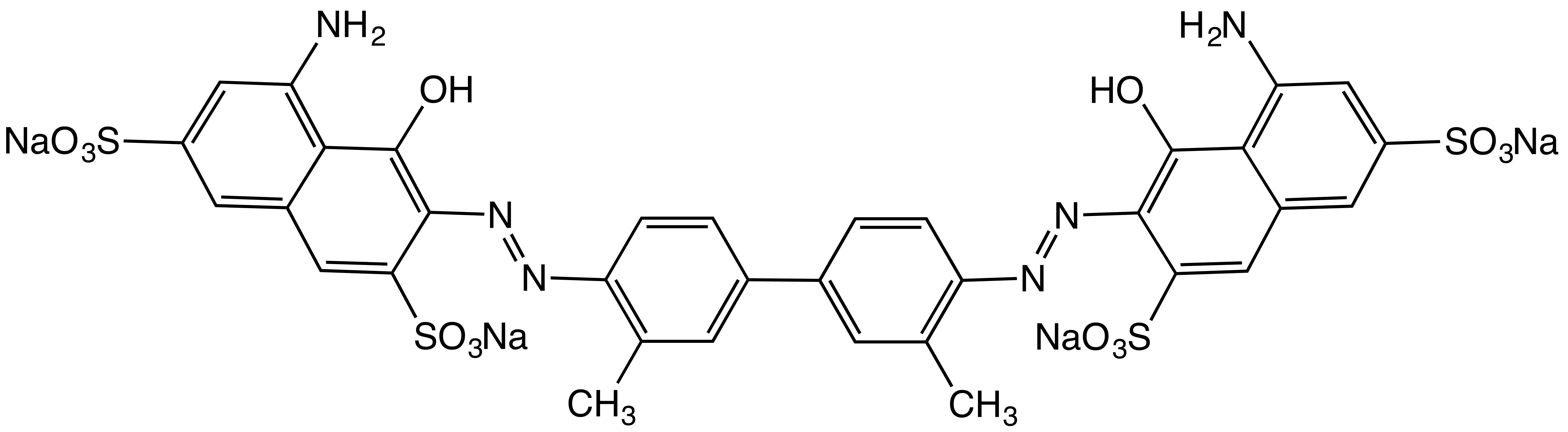
Trypan blue is an example of a direct dye, used for cotton.

== Physical properties, structure, and bonding ==
As a consequence of π-delocalization, aryl azo compounds have vivid colors, especially reds, oranges, and yellows. An example is Disperse Orange 1. Some azo compounds, e.g., methyl orange, are used as acid-base indicators. Most DVD-R/+R and some CD-R discs use blue azo dye as the recording layer.

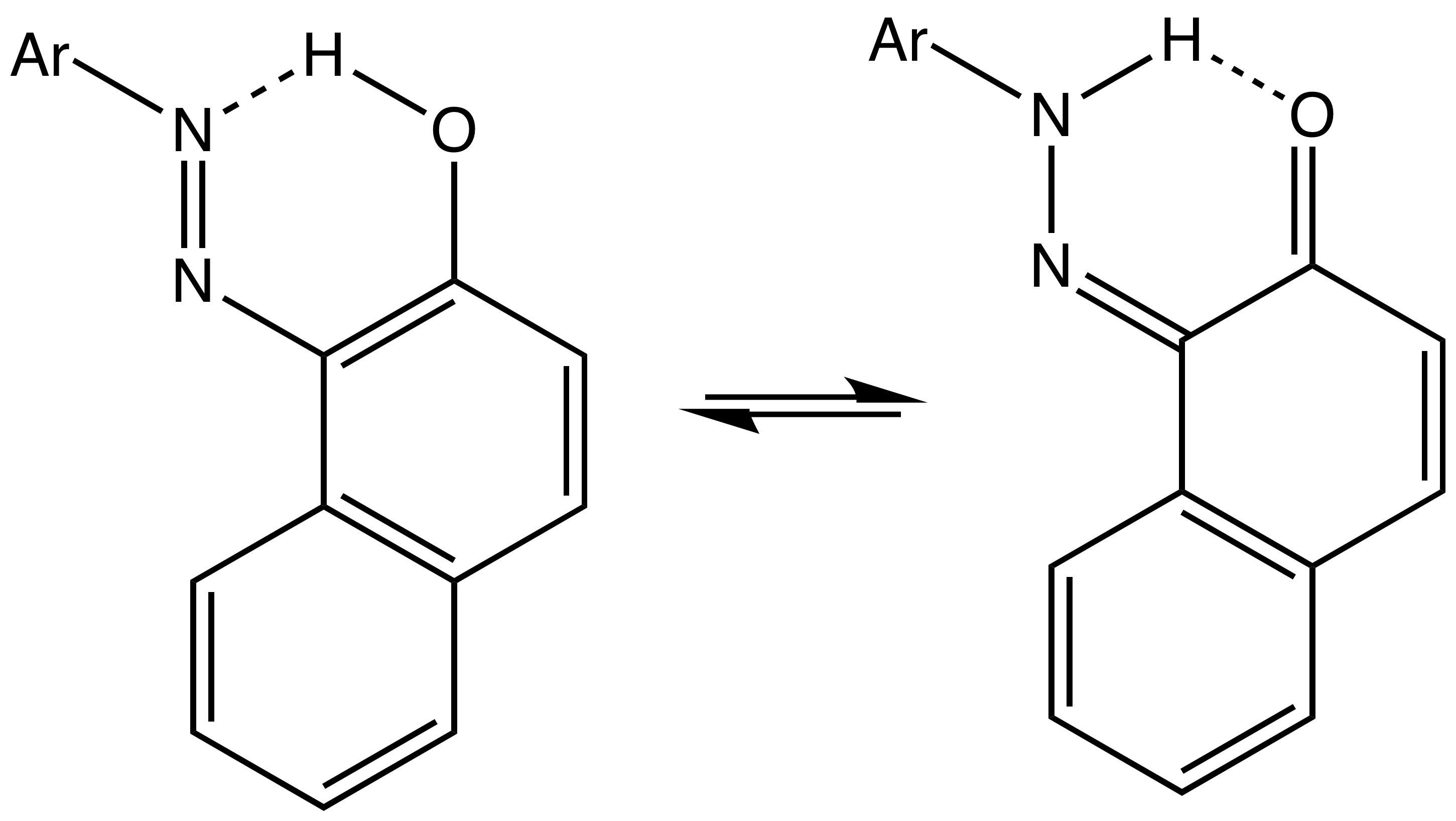
Many phenolic diazo dyes participate in tautomeric equilibria shown here in simplified form (Ar = aryl).

Azo dyes are solids. Most are salts, the colored component usually being the anion, although some cationic azo dyes are known. The anionic character of most dyes arises from the presence of 1-3 sulfonic acid groups, which are fully ionized at the pH of the dyed article:

RSO_{3}H → RSO_{3}^{−} + H^{+}

Most proteins are cationic, thus dyeing of leather and wool corresponds to an ion exchange reaction. The anionic dye adheres to these articles through electrostatic forces. Cationic azo dyes typically contain quaternary ammonium centers.

== Reversible photoisomerization ==
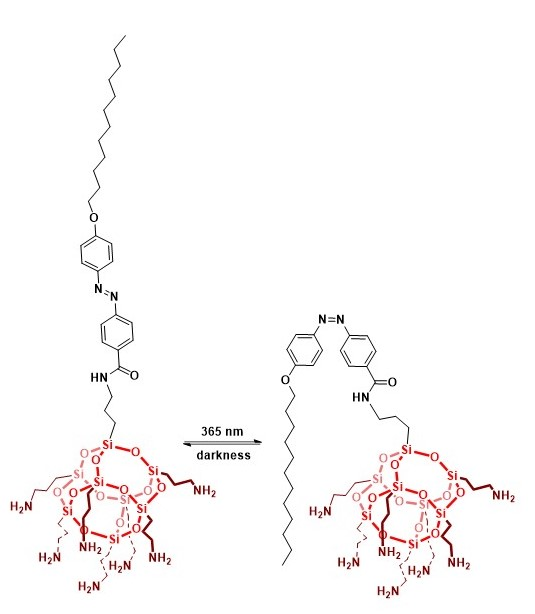
Trans-cis isomerization of azo-POSS, leading to the folding the dodecyl alkyl tail on the POSS head

A unique property of azo dyes is their ability to undergo reversible photoisomerization between trans and cis configurations. In the trans isomer, the aromatic rings (or other substituents) are on opposite sides of the double bond, resulting in a more extended and linear conformation. Upon exposure to ultraviolet (UV) light, typically at 365 nm, the molecule absorbs energy and converts to the cis isomer, where the substituents are on the same side of the N=N bond, leading to a bent or kinked structure.

This process is reversible: the cis form can thermally relax back to the trans form over time, or be actively reverted using visible light irradiation (commonly around 450–500 nm), depending on the substituents and molecular environment.

== Preparation ==
Most azo dyes are prepared by azo coupling, which entails an electrophilic substitution reaction of an aryl diazonium cation with another compound, the coupling partner. Generally, coupling partners are other aromatic compounds with electron-donating groups:

ArN^{+}_{2} + Ar′H → ArN=NAr′ + H^{+}

In practice, acetoacetanilides are widely used as coupling partners:

ArN^{+}_{2} + Ar′NHC(O)CH_{2}C(O)Me → ArN=NCH(C(O)Me)(C(O)NHAr′) + H^{+}

Azo dyes are also prepared by the condensation of nitrated aromatic compounds with anilines followed by reduction of the resulting azoxy intermediate:

ArNO_{2} + Ar′NH_{2} → ArN(O)=NAr′ + H_{2}O
ArN(O)=NAr′ + C_{6}H_{12}O_{6} → ArN=NAr′ + C_{6}H_{10}O_{6} + H_{2}O

For textile dying, a typical nitro coupling partner would be disodium 4,4′-dinitrostilbene-2,2′-disulfonate. Typical aniline partners are shown below. Since anilines are prepared from nitro compounds, some azo dyes are produced by partial reduction of aromatic nitro compounds.

Many azo dyes are produced by reactions from pre-existing azo compounds. Typical reactions include metal complexation and acylation.

Illustrative azo dyes or their precursors

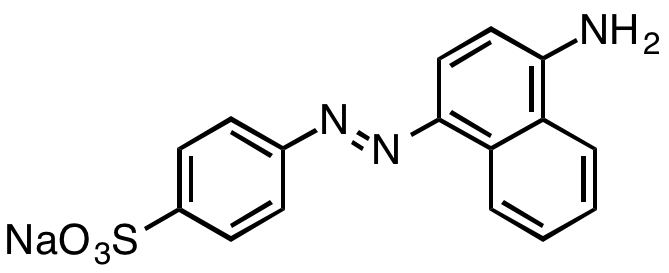
Direct Brown 78

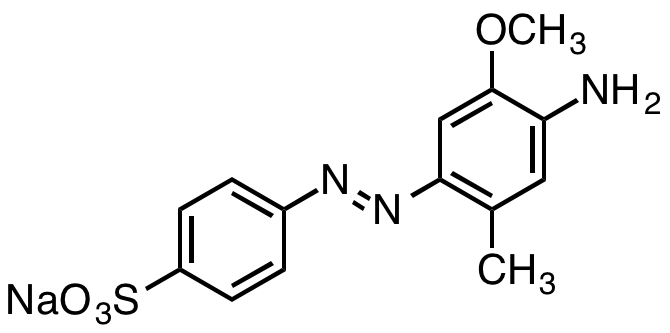

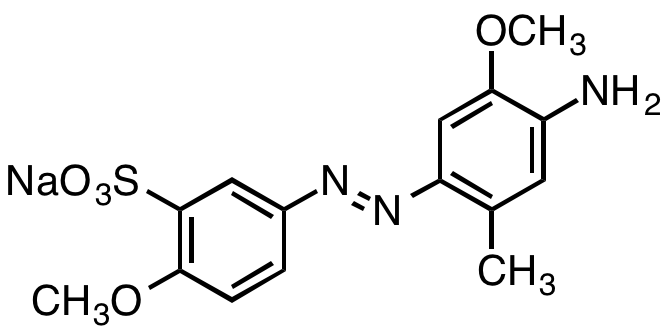

Direct Blue 1

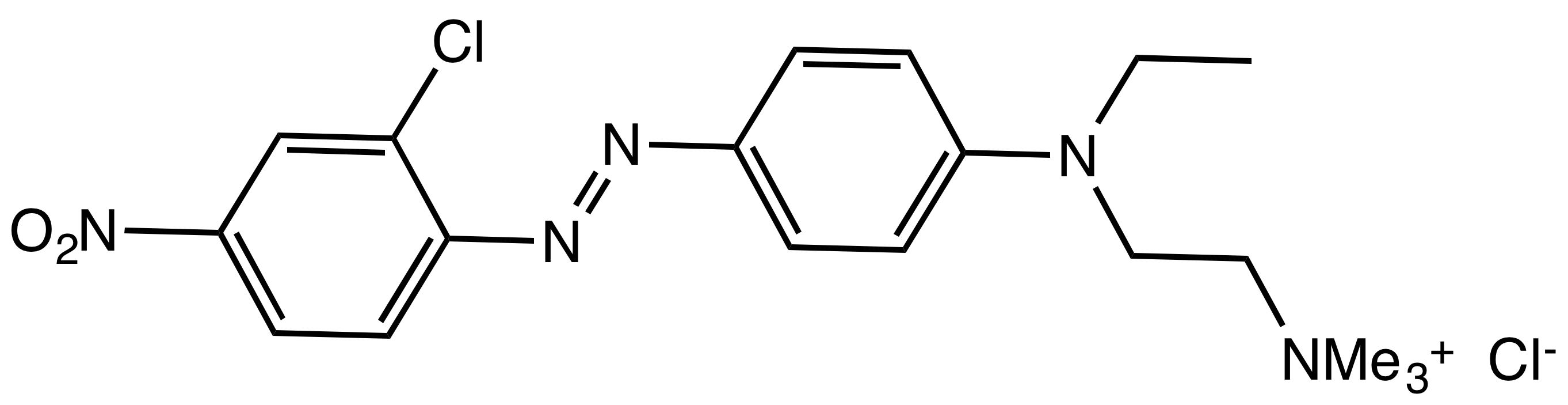
Basic Red 18, a cationic azo dye

== Azo pigments ==
Azo pigments are similar in chemical structure to azo dyes, but they lack solubilizing groups. Many so-called azo pigments are not strictly classifiable as azo compounds since they exist as keto hydrazide tautomers, which lack the -N=N- linkage.

C.I. Pigment Yellow 12, an azo pigment (also classified as a diarylide pigment).

Azo pigments are important in a variety of plastics, rubbers, and paints (including artist's paints). They have excellent coloring properties, mainly in the yellow to red range, as well as good lightfastness. The lightfastness depends not only on the properties of the organic azo compound, but also on the way they have been absorbed on the pigment carrier.

== Biodegradation ==
In order for dyes to be useful, they must possess a high degree of chemical and photolytic stability. As a result of this stability, photolysis is not considered to be a degradation pathway for azo dyes. In order to prolong the lifetime of products dyed with azo dyes, it is essential to ensure stability against microbial attack, and tests have shown that azo dyes biodegrade negligibly in short term tests under aerobic conditions. Under anaerobic conditions, however, discoloration may be observed as a consequence of biodegradation.

== Safety and regulation ==
Many azo pigments are non-toxic, although some, such as dinitroaniline orange, ortho-nitroaniline orange, or pigment orange 1, 2, and 5 are mutagenic and carcinogenic.

Azo dyes derived from benzidine are carcinogens; exposure to them has classically been associated with bladder cancer. Accordingly, the production of benzidine azo dyes was discontinued in the 1980s in many western countries.

=== European regulation ===
Certain azo dyes degrade under reductive conditions to release any of a group of defined aromatic amines. Since September 2003, the European Union has banned the manufacture or sale of consumer goods which contain the listed amines. Since only a small number of dyes produced those amines, relatively few products were actually affected.

== See also ==
- Azo coupling
- Ponceau 4R
- Ponceau S
- Glycoazodyes
