= C9H7NO =

The molecular formula C_{9}H_{7}NO (molar mass: 145.16 g/mol, exact mass: 145.0528 u) may refer to:

- 8-Hydroxyquinoline
- Indole-3-carboxaldehyde (I3A)
- Quinolones
  - 2-Quinolone
  - 4-Quinolone
