= N,N,N′,N′-Tetramethylformamidinium chloride =

Chemical compound

Names
- Preferred IUPAC name 1-(Dimethylamino)-N,N-dimethylmethaniminium chloride
- Other names (Dimethylaminomethylene)dimethylammonium chloride

Identifiers
CAS Number	1071-38-1
3D model (JSmol)	Interactive image
ChemSpider	7969557
ECHA InfoCard	100.155.312
PubChem CID	9793790
CompTox Dashboard (EPA)	DTXSID10430718
- InChI: InChI=1S/C5H13N2.ClH/c1-6(2)5-7(3)4;/h5H,1-4H3;1H/q+1;/p-1 Key: BPBLGCSAYMJJJW-UHFFFAOYSA-M
- SMILES: [Cl-].[N+](=C\N(C)C)(\C)C

Properties
Chemical formula	C_{5}H_{13}ClN_{2}
Molar mass	136.62 g·mol^{−1}
Appearance	Solid
- Except where otherwise noted, data are given for materials in their standard state (at 25 °C [77 °F], 100 kPa). Infobox references

N,N,N′,N′-Tetramethylformamidinium chloride is the simplest representative of quaternary formamidinium cations of the general formula [R_{2}N−CH=NR_{2}]^{+} with a chloride as a counterion in which all hydrogen atoms of the protonated formamidine [HC(=NH_{2})NH_{2}]^{+} are replaced by methyl groups.

Deprotonation results in the exceptionally basic bis(dimethylamino)carbene R_{2}N−C̈−NR_{2}.

== Preparation ==
It is generated by protonation of (CH_{3})_{3}COCH(N(CH_{3})_{2})_{2} (Bredereck's reagent).

(CH_{3})_{3}COCH(N(CH_{3})_{2})_{2} + H^{+} → (CH_{3})_{3}COH + [CH(N(CH_{3})_{2})_{2}]^{+}

N,N,N′,N′-Tetramethylformamidinium chloride is also obtained in high yield (95%) in the reaction of dimethylformamide (DMF) with dimethylcarbamoyl chlorideThe conversion of DMF with thionyl chloride in a ratio of 3:1 obtains the product in a is significantly lower yield (72%) which appears, however, more realistic in view of the tricky handling of the chloride salt.

Synthesis of N,N,N′,N′-tetramethylformamidinium chloride with thionyl chloride

== Properties ==
N,N,N′,N′-Tetramethylformamidinium chloride is a light yellow, strongly hygroscopic solid.

For drying, the salt is dissolved in dichloromethane and the solution is treated with solid anhydrous sodium sulfate. After several dissolutions in dichloromethane and acetone, and precipitations with tetrahydrofuran, a colorless solid is obtained, which is stable under air and moisture sealing.

The chloride counterion is substantially more (Lewis) basic than the amidinium is acidic; germanium dichloride or tin(II) chloride react with tetramethylformamidinium chloride to form trichloroadamantogenate(II) salts:

Reaction of N,N,N′,N′-tetramethylformamidinium chloride with germanium(II) chloride

The hygroscopy of the chloride salt complicates the handling of the compound. Therefore, also syntheses of the much better processible salts N,N,N′,N′-tetramethylformamidinium methylsulfate (from the dimethylformamide–dimethylsulfate complex) and of N,N,N′,N′-tetramethylformamidinium p-toluenesulfonate (from dimethylformamide and p-toluenesulfonyl chloride) were investigated.

== Applications ==
N,N,N′,N′-Tetramethylformamidinium chloride is useful as a reagent for aminomethylenation (that is, to introduce a =CH−NR^{1}R^{2} function to CH-acidic compounds). For example, ethyl cyanoacetate reacts with the formamidinium salt in the presence of solid sodium hydroxide to give ethyl (dimethylaminomethylene)cyanoacetate in practically quantitative yields.

Aminomethylenation with N,N,N′,N′-tetramethylformamidinium chloride

The aminomethylenation provides intermediates for the synthesis of heterocycles such as indoles, pyrimidines, pyridines and quinolones.

N,N,N′,N′-Tetramethylformamidinium chloride reacts with alkali metal dimethylamides (such as lithium dimethylamide or sodium dimethylamide) to tris(dimethylamino)methane in yields of 55% to 84%.

Synthesis of tris(dimethylamino)methane

The reaction product is suited as a reagent for formylation and aminomethylenation.

From N,N,N′,N′-tetramethylformamidinium chloride and sodium ethoxide in ethanol, dimethylformamide diethyl acetal is formed in 68% yield.

Synthesis of dimethylformamide diethyl acetal

In aqueous sodium cyanide, N,N,N′,N′-tetramethylformamidinium reacts to bis(dimethylamino)acetonitrile.

Synthesis of bis(dimethylamino)acetonitrile

From N,N,N′,N′-tetramethylformamidinium and anhydrous hydrogen cyanide, dimethylaminomalonic acid dinitrile is obtained in 92% yield.

Synthesis of dimethylaminomalonic acid dinitrile

N,N,N′,N′-Tetramethylformamidinium can be regaminated with cyclo-aliphatic amines to the corresponding heterocyclic formamidines.

Transamination of N,N,N′,N′-tetramethylformamidinium chloride

N,N,N′,N′-tetramethylformamidinium is a catalyst in the preparation of acyl chlorides from carboxylic acids and phosgene has been reported.

Strong bases (such as phenyllithium) can abstract a proton from the formamidinium cation of N,N,N′,N′-tetramethylformamidinium forming bis(dimethylamino)carbene.

Formation of bis(dimethylamino)carbene from N,N,N′,N′-tetramethylformamidinium chloride

== See also ==
- Bis(dimethylamino)methane
