= Tert-Butoxybis(dimethylamino)methane =

tert-Butoxybis(dimethylamino)methane

Names
- Other names Bredereck's reagent

Identifiers
CAS Number	5815-08-7
3D model (JSmol)	Interactive image
ChemSpider	72176
ECHA InfoCard	100.024.895
EC Number	227-383-9
PubChem CID	79885
UNII	JEJ0U558F7
CompTox Dashboard (EPA)	DTXSID00206888
- InChI: InChI=1S/C9H22N2O/c1-9(2,3)12-8(10(4)5)11(6)7/h8H,1-7H3 Key: HXRAMSFGUAOAJR-UHFFFAOYSA-N
- SMILES: CC(C)(C)OC(N(C)C)N(C)C

Properties
Chemical formula	C_{9}H_{22}N_{2}O
Molar mass	174.288 g·mol^{−1}
Appearance	colorless liquid
Boiling point	50-52°C at 12 mmHg

Hazards
- GHS labelling
Pictograms	(GHS02: Flammable) (GHS07: Exclamation mark)
Signal word	Warning
Hazard statements	H226, H315, H319, H335
Precautionary statements	P210, P233, P240, P241, P242, P243, P261, P264, P271, P280, P302+P352, P303+P361+P353, P304+P340, P305+P351+P338, P312, P321, P332+P313, P337+P313, P362, P370+P378, P403+P233, P403+P235, P405, P501
- Except where otherwise noted, data are given for materials in their standard state (at 25 °C [77 °F], 100 kPa). Infobox references

tert-Butoxybis(dimethylamino)methane is an organic compound with the formula (CH_{3})_{3}COCH(N(CH_{3})_{2})_{2}. The compound is classified as an aminal ester, i.e. the tert-butyl alcohol derivative of the aminal bis(dimethylamino)methane. It is a colorless liquid with a amine odor.

== Use as reagent ==
Also known as Bredereck's reagent, it is used for formylation (introduction of the CHO group). Protonation releases tert-butyl alcohol, giving tetramethylformamidinium, which displaces active C-H bonds:

(CH_{3})_{3}COCH(N(CH_{3})_{2})_{2} + H^{+} → (CH_{3})_{3}COH + [CH(N(CH_{3})_{2})_{2}]^{+}
[CH(N(CH_{3})_{2})_{2}]^{+} + CH_{2}Z_{2} → Z_{2}CHCH(N(CH_{3})_{2})_{2} + H^{+}

The resulting bis(dimethylamino)methyl derivative in turn releases dimethylamine to give an enamine, which hydrolyzes.

Z_{2}CHCH(N(CH_{3})_{2})_{2} → Z_{2}C=CHN(CH_{3})_{2} + HN(CH_{3})_{2}
Z_{2}C=CHN(CH_{3})_{2} + H_{2}O → Z_{2}CHCHO + HN(CH_{3})_{2}

== Preparation ==
Tert-Butoxybis(dimethylamino)methane is obtained from tetramethylformamidinium chloride by reaction with tert-butoxide. Tetramethylformamidinium salts are obtained by the reaction of dimethylformamide (DMF) with dimethylcarbamoyl chloride
