= Hemiaminal =

Organic compound or group with a hydroxyl and amine attached to the same carbon

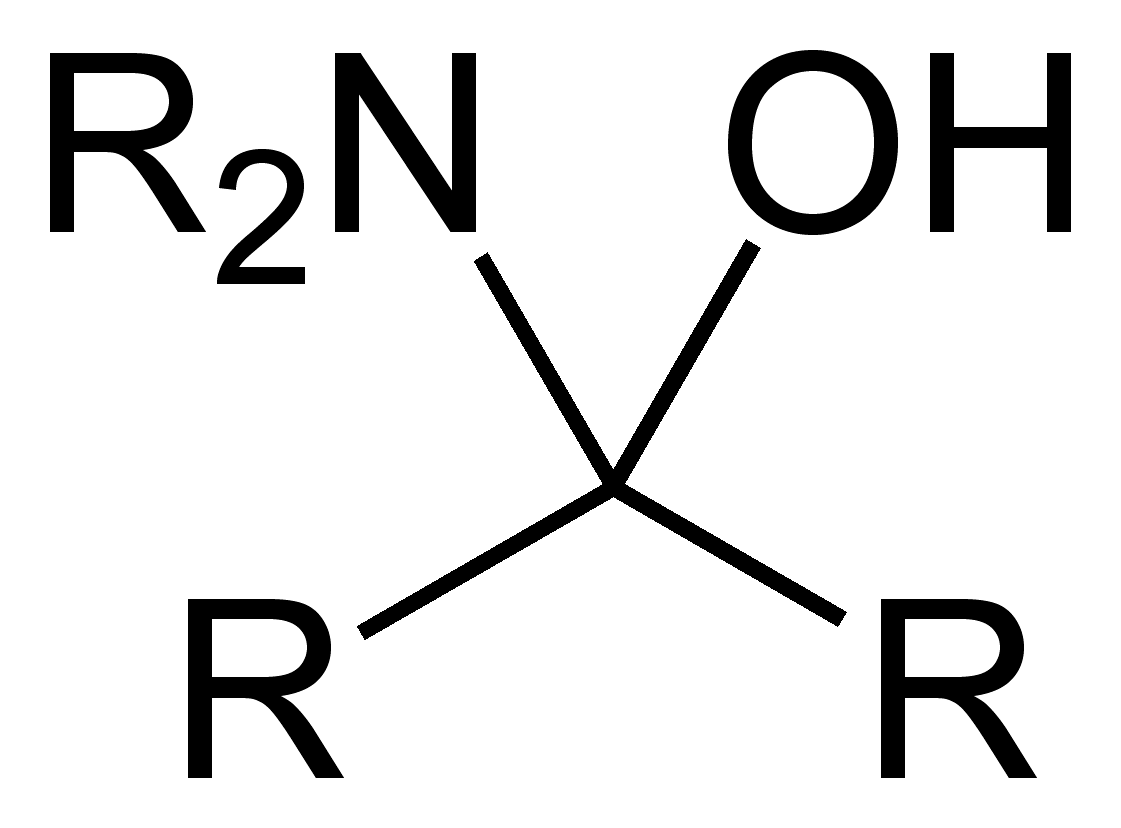
Generic hemiaminal

In organic chemistry, a hemiaminal (also carbinolamine) is a functional group or type of chemical compound that has a hydroxyl group and an amine attached to the same carbon atom: −C(OH)(NR_{2})−. R can be hydrogen or an alkyl group. Hemiaminals are intermediates in imine formation from an amine and a carbonyl by alkylimino-de-oxo-bisubstitution. Hemiaminals can be viewed as a blend of aminals and geminal diol. They are a special case of amino alcohols.

== Classification according to amine precursor ==
Hemiaminals form from the reaction of an amine and a ketone or aldehyde. The hemiaminal is sometimes isolable, but often they spontaneously dehydrate to give imines.

=== Addition of ammonia ===
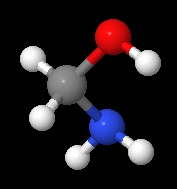
Methanolamine, a simple hemiaminal

The adducts formed by the addition of ammonia to aldehydes have long been studied. Compounds containing both a primary amino group and a hydroxyl group bonded to the same carbon atom are rarely stable ("The hemiaminal [derived from primary amines] is, except in very special cases... not observed"), as they tend to dehydrate to form imines which polymerise to hexamethylenetetramine. A rare stable example is the adduct of ammonia and hexafluoroacetone, (CF_{3})_{2}C(OH)NH_{2}.

The C-substituted derivatives are obtained by reaction of aldehydes and ammonia:

$$\ce{3 RCHO  +  3 NH3   -> (RCHNH)3  +  3 H2O}$$

=== Addition of primary amines ===
N-substituted derivatives are somewhat stable. They are invoked but rarely observed as intermediates in the Mannich reaction. These N,N',N''-trisubstituted hexahydro-1,3,5-triazines arise from the condensation of the amine and formaldehyde as illustrated by the route to 1,3,5-trimethyl-1,3,5-triazacyclohexane:

$$\ce{3 CH2O  +  3 H2NMe   ->  (CH2NMe)3  +  3 H2O}$$

Although adducts generated from primary amines or ammonia are usually unstable, the hemiaminals have been trapped in a cavity.

=== Addition of secondary amines: carbinolamines (hemiaminals) and bisaminomethanes ===
One of the simplest reactions entails condensation of formaldehyde and dimethylamine. This reaction produces first the carbinolamine (a hemiaminal) and bis(dimethylamino)methane (Me = CH_{3}):

$$\ce{Me2NH  +  CH2O  ->  Me2NCH2OH}$$
$$\ce{Me2NH  +  Me2NCH2OH  ->  Me2NCH2NMe2  +  H2O}$$

The reaction of formaldehyde with carbazole, which is weakly basic, proceed similarly:

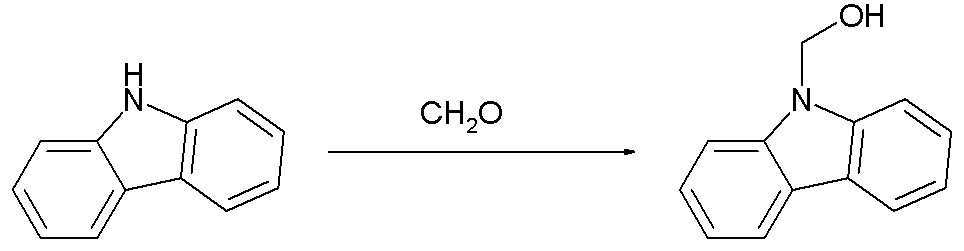

Again, this carbinol converts readily to the methylene-linked bis(carbazole).

== Hemiaminal ethers ==
Hemiaminal ethers have the following structure: R‴-C(NR'_{2})(OR")-R⁗. The glycosylamines are examples of cyclic hemiaminal ethers.

Hemiaminals and ethers

methanolamine, an intermediate in the reaction of ammonia with formaldehyde

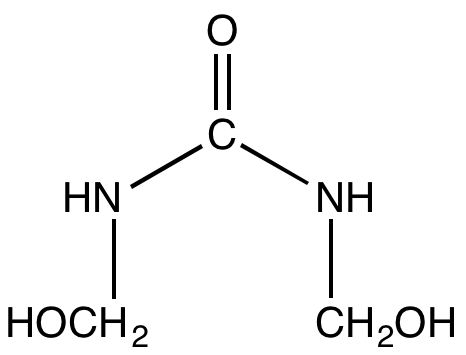
Bis(hydroxymethyl)urea is a commercially useful hemiaminal

An unusual example of an isolable, acyclic hemiaminal: the adduct of ammonia and hexafluoroacetone

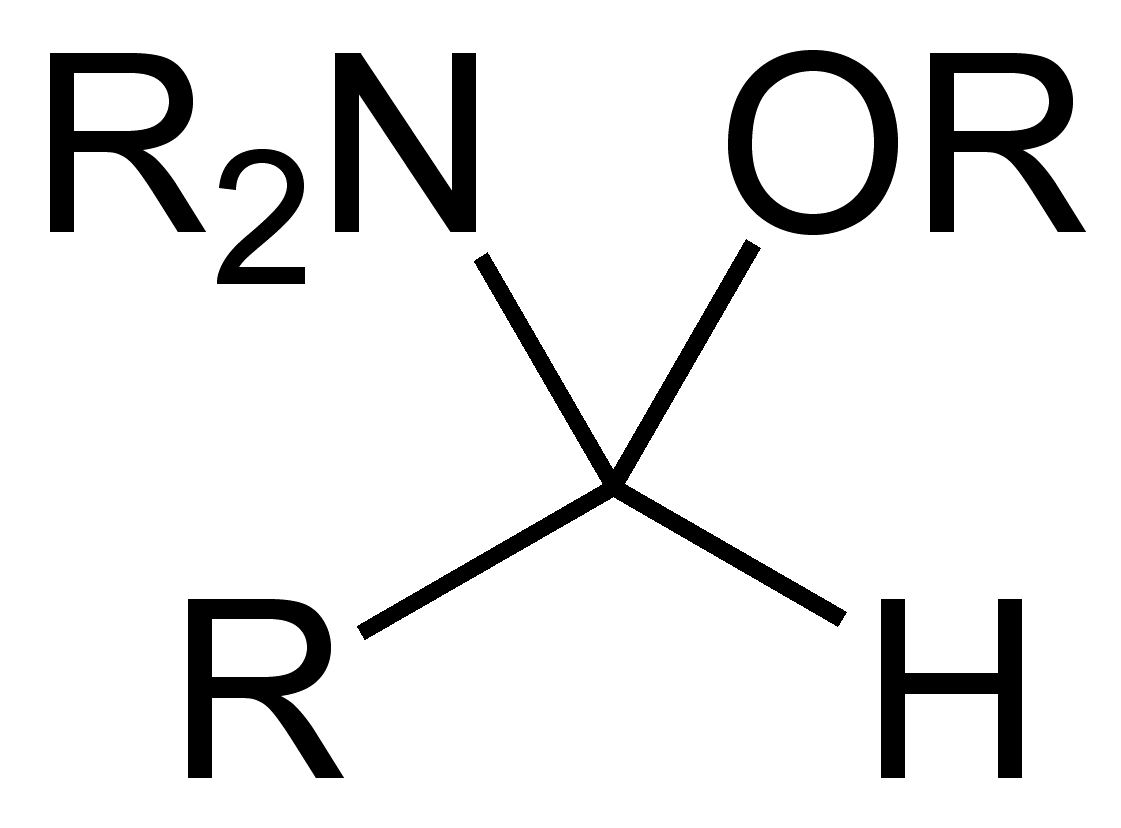
Hemiaminal ether derived from an aldehyde

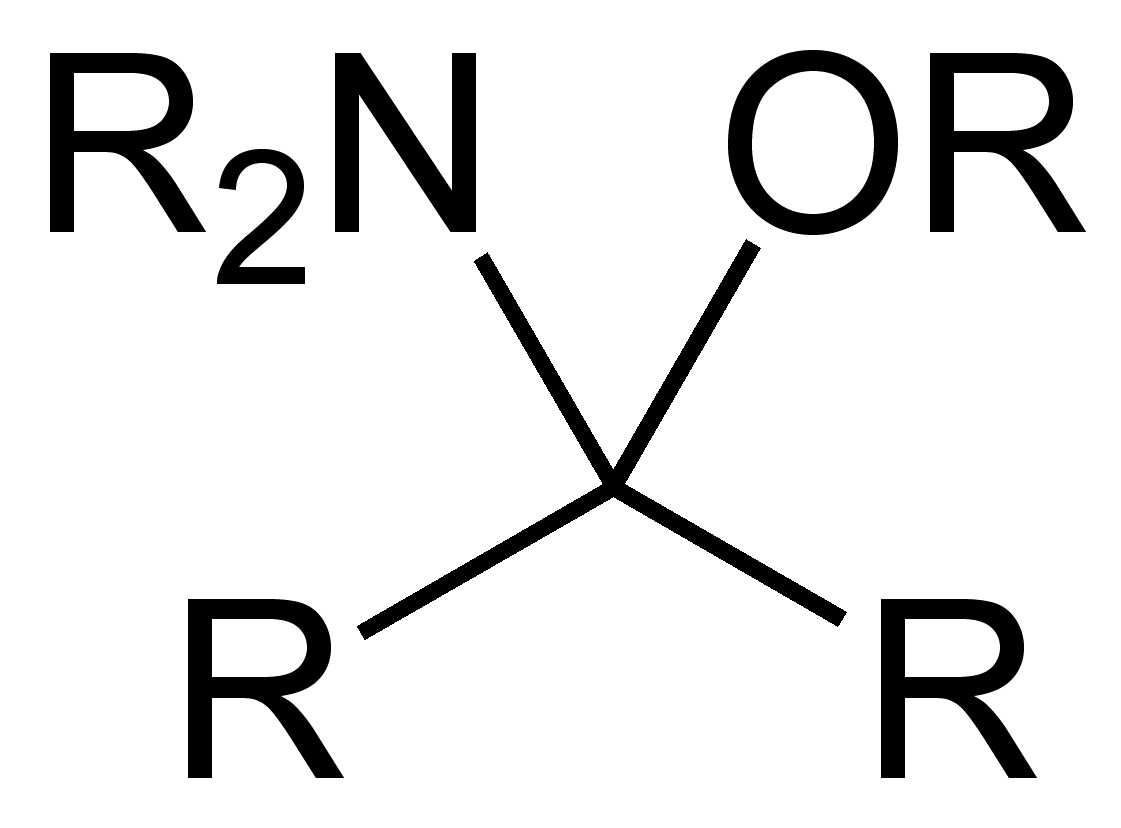
Hemiaminal ether derived from a ketone

Tert-Butoxybis(dimethylamino)methane

== Use in total synthesis ==
Hemiaminal formation is a key step in an asymmetric total synthesis of saxitoxin:

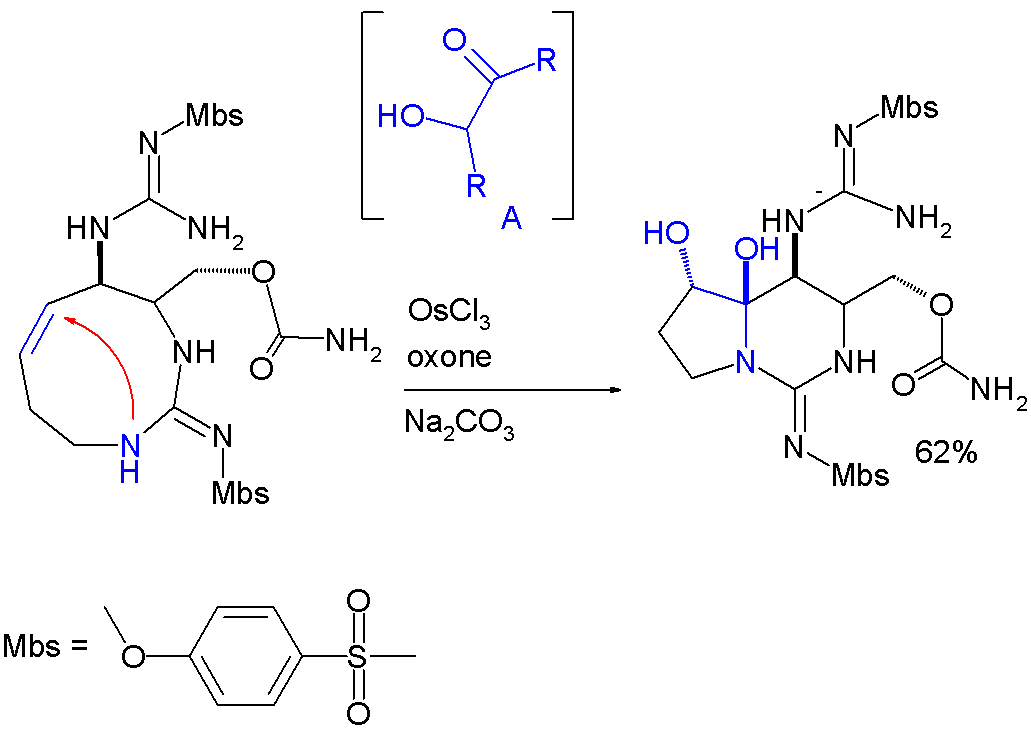

In this reaction step the alkene group is first oxidized to an intermediate acyloin by action of osmium(III) chloride, oxone (sacrificial catalyst) and sodium carbonate (base).

== See also ==
- Aminal
- Alkanolamine
- Hemiacetal
