= C7H19N3 =

The molecular formula C_{7}H_{19}N_{3} may refer to:

- Spermidine, a polyamine compound found in ribosomes and living tissues
- Tris(dimethylamino)methane, the simplest representative of the tris(dialkylamino)methanes of the general formula (R2N)3CH
