= 2-hydroxyquinoline 8-monooxygenase =

Class of enzymes

Identifiers
- EC no.: 1.14.13.61

Databases
- IntEnz: IntEnz view
- BRENDA: BRENDA entry
- ExPASy: NiceZyme view
- KEGG: KEGG entry
- MetaCyc: metabolic pathway
- PRIAM: profile
- PDB structures: RCSB PDB PDBe PDBsum
Search
- PMC: articles
- PubMed: articles
- NCBI: proteins

2-hydroxyquinoline 8-monooxygenase (EC 1.14.13.61) is an enzyme that catalyzes the chemical reaction

2-hydroxyquinoline
+ NADH + H^{+}
O_{2}
H_{2}O
2,8-dihydroxyquinoline
+ NAD^{+}

The four substrates of this enzyme are 2-hydroxyquinoline, reduced nicotinamide adenine dinucleotide (NADH), oxygen, and a proton. Its products are 2,8-dihydroxyquinoline, oxidised NAD^{+}, and water.

The enzyme is a flavin-containing monooxygenase that uses molecular oxygen as oxidant and incorporates one of its atoms into the starting material. The systematic name of this enzyme class is quinolin-2(1H)-one,NADH:oxygen oxidoreductase (8-oxygenating). This enzyme is also called 2-oxo-1,2-dihydroquinoline 8-monooxygenase. It is an iron–sulfur protein.

== Structural studies ==
As of late 2007, 3 structures have been solved for this class of enzymes, with PDB accession codes 1Z01, 1Z02, and 1Z03.
