= AsqJ =

Biosynthetic enzyme

AsqJ is an iron(II), α-ketoglutarate dependent oxygenase that catalyzes the transformation of various N4-methylated benzodiazepines to various fused, 6-membered heterocyclic scaffolds. It was first identified in a biosynthetic gene cluster of Aspergillus nidulans, in which it is involved in the production of aspoquinolones. It is a metalloprotein, relying on an iron cofactor for its catalytic activity.

== Discovery and background ==
AsqJ was first encountered in studies concerning the biosynthesis of the hydroxyquinolone viridicatin in Aspergillus nidulans. It catalyzes the ring contraction of a 6,7-benzodiazepinedione cyclopeptin to a 6,6 quinolone through a two-step process. First, AsqJ performs a radical-mediated dehydrogenation via an oxo-Fe(IV) cofactor to desaturate the exocyclic C-C bond and generate one equivalent of water. Through radical abstraction by the metal-oxo species, the Fe(IV) cofactor is reduced to Fe(III), undergoing a second reduction to Fe(II) and loss of the nascent hydroxy ligand. AsqJ's iron cofactor is then reoxidized to an oxo-Fe(IV) state, allowing oxo transfer to epoxidize the newly generated double bond via a 2-step radical mechanism, regenerating the Fe(II) cofactor and releasing the epoxidized substrate cyclopenin. The epoxide is thought to then spontaneously undergo a ring-rearrangement reaction in acidic conditions, forming the 3-hydroxy quinolone which is then further manipulated to generate viridicatin.

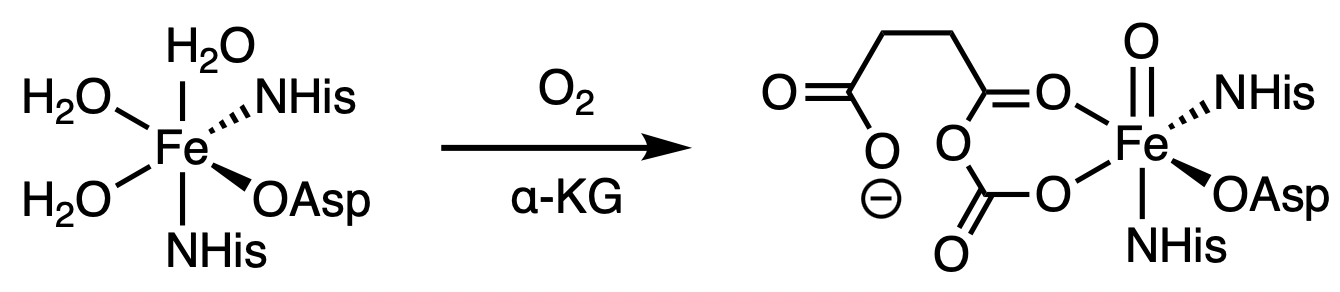
AsqJ's iron cofactor undergoes oxidation and complexation with α-ketoglutarate to perform its enzymatic reactions

== Mechanism of natural biosynthetic transformation ==
AsqJ is reliant on its iron bound cofactor for its activity. Fe2+ to Ni2+ substitution results in enzyme inactivation. AsqJ displays a characteristic H1-X-D/E-Xn-H2 binding motif of Fe(II)/αKG dioxygenases. The catalytic iron atom is held in place by three AsqJ residues, H134, H211, and D136, as well as an α-ketoglutarate molecule. In the resting state, a water molecule as well as the C-1 carboxylate and C-2 keto group of the α-ketoglutarate preserve the metal in an octahedral coordination sphere.

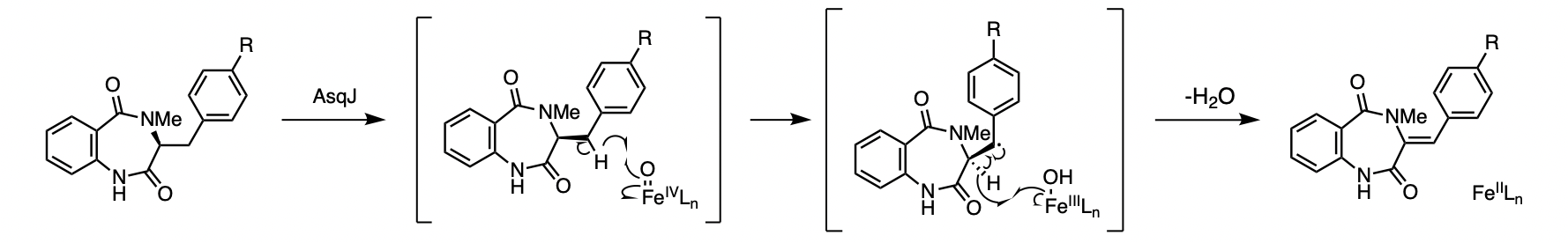

Following desaturation, the substrate is placed on the opposite face relative to the HDH triad, with the substrate fixed in a boat confirmation such that the pseudo-equatorial methoxybenzyl substituent and the exocyclic aromatic ring may form a π stacking interaction with H134, one of the three residues binding the iron cofactor. Following oxygen coordination to iron to form a peroxo ligand, the radical-mediated dehydration and epoxidation can subsequently take place. The π stacking interaction between H134 and the aromatic ring of the substrate is thought to stabilize the endo conformation of the epoxide, allowing for the cascade rearrangement to occur. Opening of the epoxide forms a methylamide bridged intermediate, which can then open and loose methyl isocyanate to generate the quinolone. This biosynthetic machinery has been investigated for its potential to diversify scaffold libraries, in which substrates that can be formed into potential cross-coupling partners have been synthesized by Tang and coworkers.

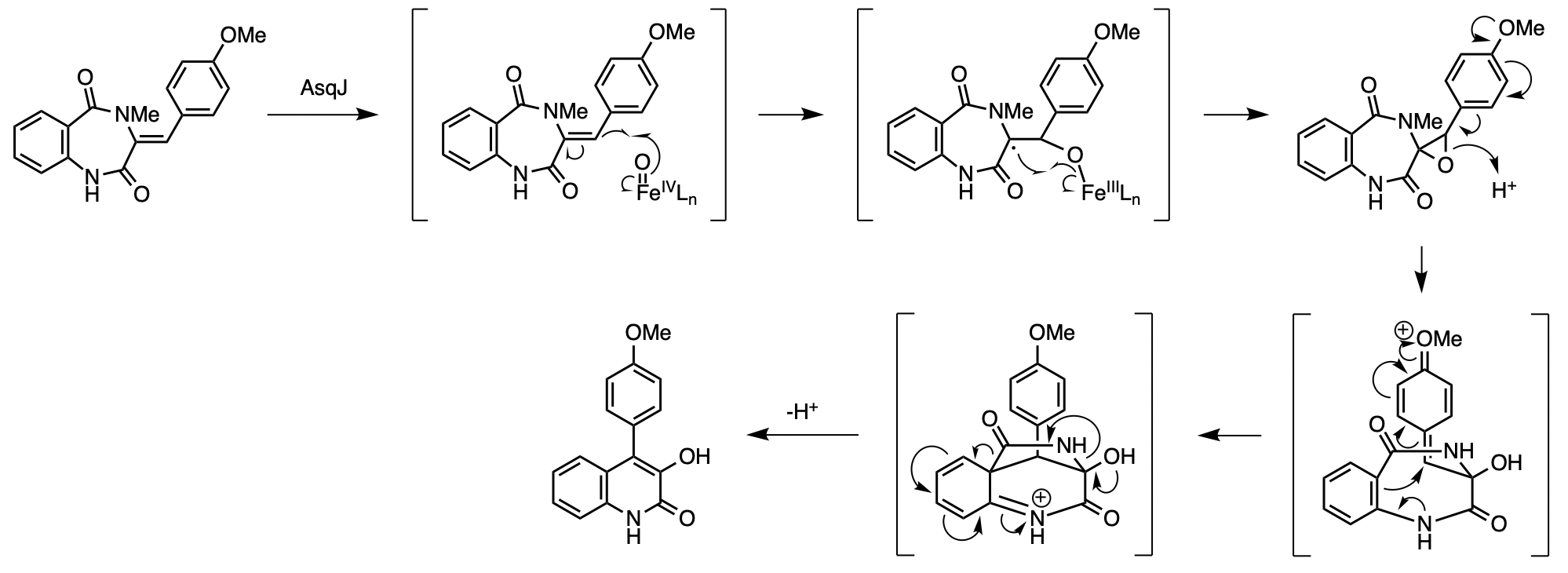

== Alternative transformations ==
Beyond its canonical biosynthetic application, AsqJ has been shown to catalyze the formation of quinazolinones. In the absence of an aromatic ring to stabilize the ”benzylic” C-10 carbon-centered radical, The Fe(IV) cofactor instead prefers to abstract a proton from the endocyclic C-3 position of the substrate. A second hydrogen atom abstraction from the amide nitrogen is then thought to generate an α-lactam intermediate through radical recombination. Hydrolytic cleavage and subsequent loss of carbon dioxide would then yield the quinazolinone. This alternative reactivity highlights the synthetic utility of AsqJ to catalyze reactions in a substrate-dependent manner. Further studies by Einsiedler and coworkers have elaborated the scope of this reactivity.

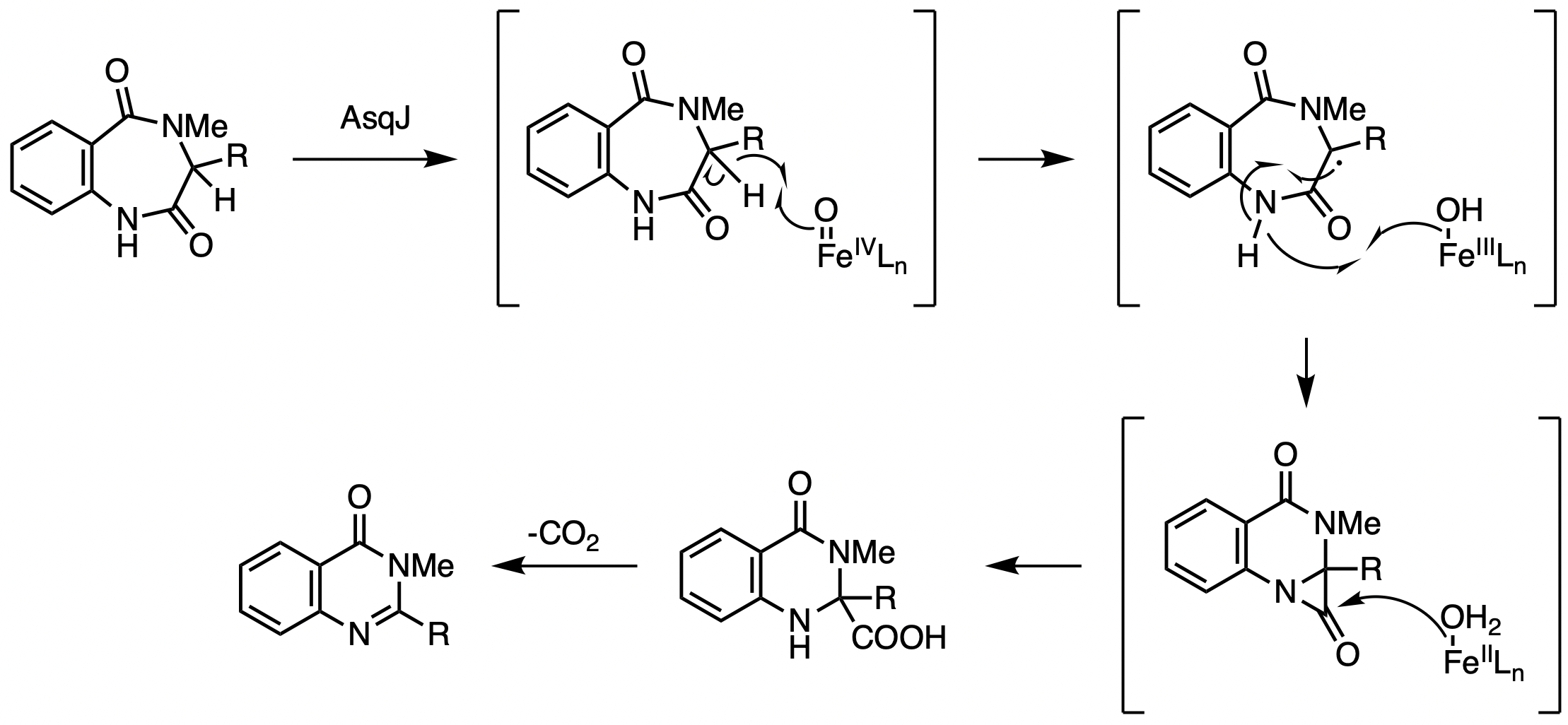
AsqJ can also undergo transformation to generate quinazolinones on non-natural substrates
