= Acetoacetanilide =

Names
- Preferred IUPAC name 3-Oxo-N-phenylbutanamide
- Other names Acetoacetylaminobenzene

Identifiers
CAS Number	102-01-2
3D model (JSmol)	Interactive image
ChEMBL	ChEMBL1604429
ChemSpider	7311
ECHA InfoCard	100.002.725
EC Number	202-996-4
PubChem CID	7592
UNII	W35JB9PY3X
CompTox Dashboard (EPA)	DTXSID0024397
- InChI: InChI=1S/C10H11NO2/c1-8(12)7-10(13)11-9-5-3-2-4-6-9/h2-6H,7H2,1H3,(H,11,13) Key: DYRDKSSFIWVSNM-UHFFFAOYSA-N; InChI=1/C10H11NO2/c1-8(12)7-10(13)11-9-5-3-2-4-6-9/h2-6H,7H2,1H3,(H,11,13) Key: DYRDKSSFIWVSNM-UHFFFAOYAR
- SMILES: CC(=O)CC(=O)NC1=CC=CC=C1

Properties
Chemical formula	C_{10}H_{11}NO_{2}
Molar mass	177.203 g·mol^{−1}
Appearance	Colourless solid
Melting point	83 to 88 °C (181 to 190 °F; 356 to 361 K)
Solubility in water	low

Hazards
- GHS labelling
Pictograms	(GHS07: Exclamation mark) (GHS08: Health hazard)
Signal word	Warning
Hazard statements	H302, H312, H332, H373
Precautionary statements	P260, P264, P270, P271, P280, P301+P312, P302+P352, P304+P312, P304+P340, P312, P314, P322, P330, P363, P501
NFPA 704 (fire diamond)	2 1 0
- Except where otherwise noted, data are given for materials in their standard state (at 25 °C [77 °F], 100 kPa). Infobox references

Acetoacetanilide is an organic compound with the formula CH_{3}C(O)CH_{2}C(O)NHC_{6}H_{5}. It is the acetoacetamide derivative of aniline. It is a white solid that is poorly soluble in water. This chemical and many related compounds (prepared from various aniline derivatives) are used in the production of organic pigments called arylide yellows, one example being Pigment Yellow 74.

== Structure ==
Acetoacetanilide crystallizes as the keto-amide tautomer according to X-ray crystallography. The molecules are linked by intermolecular hydrogen bonds, which allows the benzoyl ketone to rotate out of the plane of the amide. For the general case of substituted acetoanilides, substituents on the aryl ring affect the balance of intra- vs intermolecular hydrogen bonding. The situation is illustrated by the 2' vs. 3' vs. 4' fluoro-substituted acetoacetanilides.

== Preparation and reactions ==
Acetoacetanilide is prepared by acetoacetylation of aniline using diketene. Many analogues have been prepared.

To make the dyes, acetoacetanilides are coupled to diazonium salts, "azo coupling".

Acetoacetylation with diketene followed by diazo coupling. The ketohydrazone tautomer is shown.

In the presence of sulfuric acid, acetoacetanilide dehydrates to give 4-methyl-2-quinolone.

== Related compounds ==
- Acetoacetamide, CH_{3}COCH_{2}CONH_{2}
- C_{10}H_{11}NO_{2}
