= C10H24N4 =

The molecular formula C_{10}H_{24}N_{4} (molar mass: 200.330 g/mol, exact mass: 200.2001 u) may refer to:

- Cyclam (1,4,8,11-tetraazacyclotetradecane)
- Tetrakis(dimethylamino)ethylene (TDAE)
