= Quinoline 2-oxidoreductase =

Type of enzyme

quinoline 2-oxidoreductase

Identifiers
- EC no.: 1.3.99.17
- CAS no.: 132264-32-5

Databases
- IntEnz: IntEnz view
- BRENDA: BRENDA entry
- ExPASy: NiceZyme view
- KEGG: KEGG entry
- MetaCyc: metabolic pathway
- PRIAM: profile
- PDB structures: RCSB PDB PDBe PDBsum
- Gene Ontology: AmiGO / QuickGO
Search
- PMC: articles
- PubMed: articles
- NCBI: proteins

In enzymology, quinoline 2-oxidoreductase (EC 1.3.99.17) is an enzyme that catalyzes the chemical reaction:

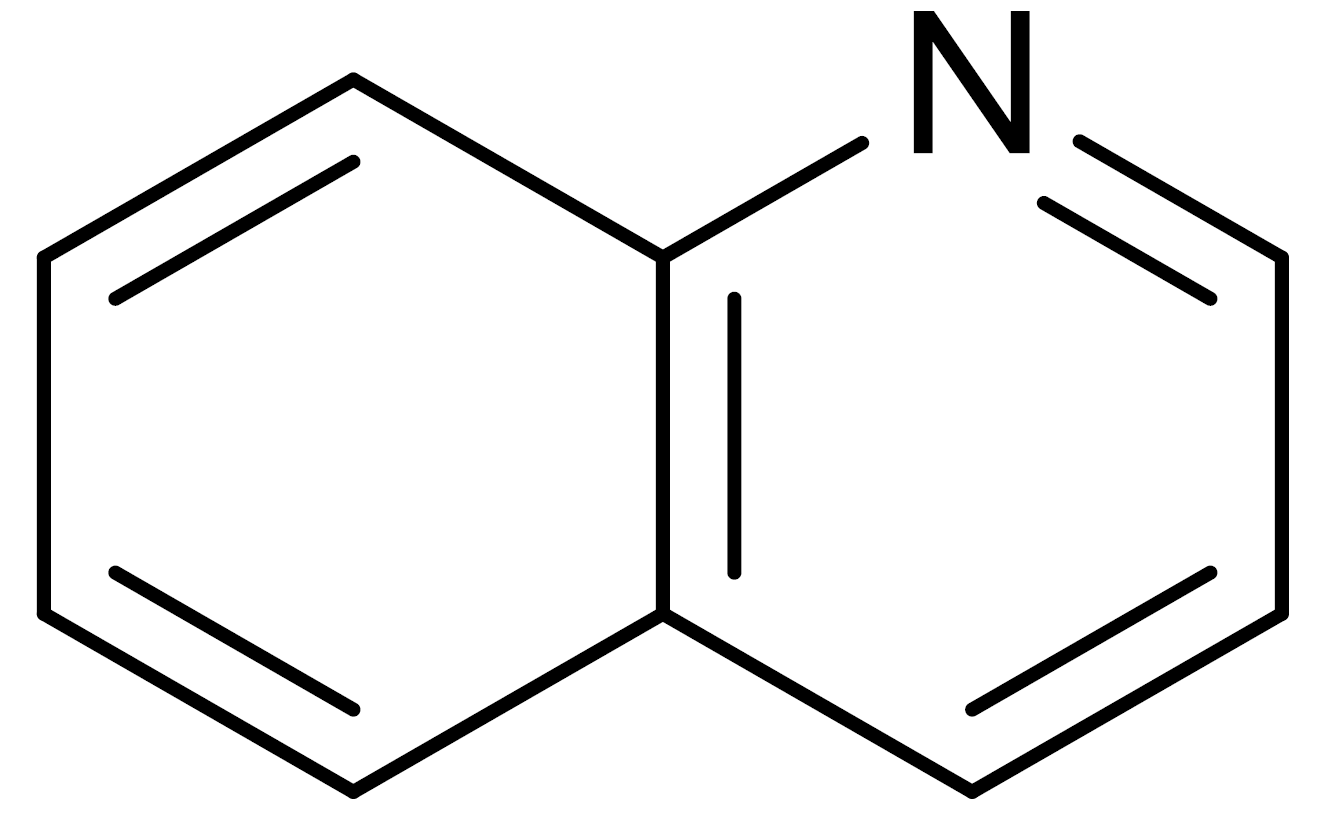
Quinoline
+ electron acceptor
H_{2}O
H_{2}O
2-Quinolone
+ reduced acceptor

The three substrates of this enzyme are quinoline, an electron acceptor, and water. Its products are 2-quinolone and reduced acceptor.

This enzyme belongs to the family of oxidoreductases, specifically those acting on the CH-CH group of donor with other acceptors. The systematic name of this enzyme class is quinoline:acceptor 2-oxidoreductase (hydroxylating).

== Structural studies ==
As of late 2007, only one structure has been solved for this class of enzymes, with the PDB accession code 1T3Q.
