= Acetoacetamide =

Chemical compound

Names
- Other names 3-oxobutanamide, 3-oxobutyramide

Identifiers
| CAS Number | 5977-14-0 |
| 3D model (JSmol) | Interactive image |
| ChEBI | CHEBI:28515 |
| ChEMBL | ChEMBL1984636 |
| ChemSpider | 72327 |
| ECHA InfoCard | 100.025.250 |
| EC Number | 227-774-4 |
| KEGG | C11106 |
| PubChem CID | 80077 |
| UNII | 6O9U7CFY0T |
| CompTox Dashboard (EPA) | DTXSID1040164 |
- InChI: InChI=1S/C4H7NO2/c1-3(6)2-4(5)7/h2H2,1H3,(H2,5,7) Key: GCPWJFKTWGFEHH-UHFFFAOYSA-N
- SMILES: CC(=O)CC(=O)N

Properties
| Chemical formula | C_{4}H_{7}NO_{2} |
| Molar mass | 101.105 g·mol^{−1} |
| Appearance | white solid |
| Melting point | 53-56 |
- Except where otherwise noted, data are given for materials in their standard state (at 25 °C [77 °F], 100 kPa). Infobox references

Acetoacetamide is an organic compound with the formula CH_{3}COCH_{2}CONH_{2}. It is the amide of acetoacetic acid. It is produced by treating diketene with aqueous ammonia

It results from degradation of the sweetener acesulfame potassium.

== Related compounds ==
Acetoacetanilide (CH_{3}COCH_{2}CONH_{2}) is the N-phenyl derivative of acetoacetamide. It is also prepared from diketene. It and various derivatives are used in the production of organic pigments called arylide yellows, one example being Pigment Yellow 74. Many analogues have been prepared. To make the dyes, acetoacetanilides are coupled to diazonium salts, "azo coupling".

Acetoacetylation with diketene followed by diazo coupling. The ketohydrazone tautomer is shown.
