= C10H11NO2 =

The molecular formula C_{10}H_{11}NO_{2} (molar mass: 177.20 g/mol, exact mass: 177.0790 u) may refer to:

- Acetoacetanilide
- MDAI (5,6-methylenedioxy-2-aminoindane)
- TDIQ
