= Yttrium triflate =

Names
- IUPAC name tris(trifluoromethanesulfonate);yttrium(3+)
- Other names: Trifluoromethanesulfonic acid yttrium(III) salt; Y(OTf)_{3}; Yttrium Trifluoromethanesulfonate

Identifiers
CAS Number	52093-30-8
3D model (JSmol)	Interactive image
ChemSpider	2015702
ECHA InfoCard	100.156.916
EC Number	628-665-8
PubChem CID	2733939
CompTox Dashboard (EPA)	DTXSID20370050
- InChI: InChI=1S/3CHF3O3S.Y/c3*2-1(3,4)8(5,6)7;/h3*(H,5,6,7);/q;;;+3/p-3 Key: JPJIEXKLJOWQQK-UHFFFAOYSA-K
- SMILES: [Y+3].[O-]S(=O)(=O)C(F)(F)F.[O-]S(=O)(=O)C(F)(F)F.[O-]S(=O)(=O)C(F)(F)F

Properties
Chemical formula	C_{3}F_{9}O_{9}S_{3}Y
Molar mass	536.10 g·mol^{−1}
Appearance	colorless solid
Density	1.7 g/cm^{3}
Melting point	300 °C (572 °F; 573 K)
Solubility in water	soluble

Hazards
- GHS labelling
Pictograms	(GHS07: Exclamation mark)
Signal word	Warning
Hazard statements	H315, H319, H335
Precautionary statements	P261, P264, P264+P265, P271, P280, P302+P352, P304+P340, P305+P351+P338, P319, P321, P332+P317, P337+P317, P362+P364, P403+P233, P405, P501
- Except where otherwise noted, data are given for materials in their standard state (at 25 °C [77 °F], 100 kPa). Infobox references

Yttrium triflate is a complex inorganic compound of yttrium, fluorine, carbon, sulphur, and oxygen with the chemical formula (CF_{3}SO_{3})_{3}Y. This is the yttrium(III) salt of triflic acid.

== Properties ==
The compound forms a colorless solid that is highly hygroscopic and forms hydrates. It is soluble in water and soluble in polar organic solvents such as acetonitrile, THF, and methanol.

Yttrium triflate is a specialised Lewis acid catalyst widely used in organic synthesis, particularly in carbon–carbon bond-forming reactions such as the aldol reactions, Diels–Alder cycloaddition, and Friedel–Crafts acylations. It is valued for its stability in water and resistance to decomposition, in contrast to traditional Lewis acids like aluminium trichloride or boron trifluoride.

== Synthesis ==
Yttrium triflate is prepared from yttrium(III) oxide and 50% aqueous trifluoromethanesulfonic acid.

Y_{2}O_{3} + 6CF_{3}SO_{3}H → 2Y(CF_{3}SO_{3})_{3} + 3H_{2}O

The product is crystallised from water or an organic solvent and can be dried to remove excess water.

Alternatively, the compound may be synthesised from yttrium(III) chloride and silver triflate, but the oxide method is preferred for large-scale preparation.

== Uses ==
The compound catalyzes aldol reactions and cycloadditions. It can be fixed to silica to obtain a heterogeneous catalyst for Michael additions and Diels-Alder reactions. Other reactions catalyzed by yttrium triflate include the polymerization of caprolactone, the trimerization of nitriles to triazines, and the addition of amines to nitriles to form amidines.
