= Dimethylcarbamoyl fluoride =

Names
- Preferred IUPAC name Dimethylcarbamoyl fluoride

Identifiers
CAS Number	431-14-1
3D model (JSmol)	Interactive image
ChemSpider	9507
PubChem CID	9891
UNII	9SWL4EET8F
CompTox Dashboard (EPA)	DTXSID20195689
- InChI: InChI=1S/C3H6FNO/c1-5(2)3(4)6/h1-2H3 Key: IRSDGYFTDVBVAK-UHFFFAOYSA-N
- SMILES: CN(C)C(=O)F

Properties
Chemical formula	C_{3}H_{6}FNO
Molar mass	91.085 g·mol^{−1}
Appearance	Colorless liquid
Solubility in water	Soluble

Hazards
- Occupational safety and health (OHS/OSH)
Main hazards	Highly toxic

Related compounds
Related compounds	Dimethylcarbamoyl chloride
- Except where otherwise noted, data are given for materials in their standard state (at 25 °C [77 °F], 100 kPa). Infobox references

Dimethylcarbamoyl fluoride is a chemical compound that can be produced by fluorination of dimethylcarbamoyl chloride with potassium fluoride. It is a colorless liquid that is soluble and stable in water.

Dimethylcarbamoyl fluoride is a potent cholinesterase inhibitor and is lethal even at low doses.

== See also ==
- Dimethylcarbamoyl chloride
