= 2-Methoxy-4-nitroaniline =

Names
- Preferred IUPAC name 2-Methoxy-4-nitroaniline
- Other names 4-Nitro-o-anisidine, 4-Nitroanisidine

Identifiers
CAS Number	97-52-9
3D model (JSmol)	Interactive image
ChEMBL	ChEMBL1518220
ChemSpider	7060
ECHA InfoCard	100.002.354
EC Number	202-588-6
PubChem CID	7337
UNII	DPU26P1846
CompTox Dashboard (EPA)	DTXSID0038700
- InChI: InChI=1S/C7H8N2O3/c1-12-7-4-5(9(10)11)2-3-6(7)8/h2-4H,8H2,1H3 Key: GVBHRNIWBGTNQA-UHFFFAOYSA-N
- SMILES: COC1=C(C=CC(=C1)[N+](=O)[O-])N

Properties
Chemical formula	C_{7}H_{8}N_{2}O_{3}
Molar mass	168.152 g·mol^{−1}
Appearance	yellow solid
Density	1.42 g/cm^{3}
Melting point	140–142 °C (284–288 °F; 413–415 K)

Hazards
- GHS labelling
Pictograms	(GHS07: Exclamation mark) (GHS08: Health hazard) (GHS09: Environmental hazard)
Signal word	Warning
Hazard statements	H302, H351, H411
Precautionary statements	P203, P261, P264, P264+P265, P270, P271, P273, P280, P301+P317, P302+P352, P304+P340, P305+P351+P338, P318, P319, P321, P330, P332+P317, P337+P317, P362+P364, P391, P403+P233, P405, P501
- Except where otherwise noted, data are given for materials in their standard state (at 25 °C [77 °F], 100 kPa). Infobox references

2-Methoxy-4-nitroaniline is an organic compound with the formula O_{2}NC_{6}H_{3}(OCH_{3})NH_{2}. It is one of four isomers of methoxynitroaniline. The compound is a precursor to the commercial Pigment Yellow 74.

== Safety ==
It induces expression of some versions of cytochrome P450.
