= Dimethylcarbamoyl chloride =

Names
- Preferred IUPAC name Dimethylcarbamoyl chloride

Identifiers
CAS Number	79-44-7
3D model (JSmol)	Interactive image
ChemSpider	6348
ECHA InfoCard	100.001.099
PubChem CID	6598
UNII	5D54S95GT6
CompTox Dashboard (EPA)	DTXSID1020512
- InChI: InChI=1S/C3H6ClNO/c1-5(2)3(4)6/h1-2H3 Key: YIIMEMSDCNDGTB-UHFFFAOYSA-N
- SMILES: CN(C)C(=O)Cl

Properties
Chemical formula	C_{3}H_{6}ClNO
- Except where otherwise noted, data are given for materials in their standard state (at 25 °C [77 °F], 100 kPa). Infobox references

Dimethylcarbamoyl chloride (DMCC) is a reagent for transferring a dimethylcarbamoyl group to alcoholic or phenolic hydroxyl groups forming dimethyl carbamates, usually having pharmacological or pesticidal activities. Because of its high toxicity and its carcinogenic properties shown in animal experiments and presumably also in humans, dimethylcarbamoyl chloride can only be used under stringent safety precautions.

== Production and occurrence ==
The production of dimethylcarbamoyl chloride from phosgene and dimethylamine was reported as early as 1879 (reported as "Dimethylharnstoffchlorid" – dimethylurea chloride).

Synthesis of dimethylcarbamoyl chloride with dimethylamine

DMCC can be produced in high yields (90%) at 275 °C by reacting phosgene with gaseous dimethylamine in a flow reactor. To suppress the formation of ureas, excess phosgene is used (in a 3:1 ratio).

The reaction can also be carried out at the laboratory scale with diphosgene or triphosgene and an aqueous dimethylamine solution in the two-phase system of benzene–xylene and water in a stirred reactor with sodium hydroxide as an acid scavenger. However, considerably lower yields (56%) are achieved due to the hydrolysis sensitivity of DMCC.

Dimethylcarbamoyl chloride is also formed (together with methyl chloride) when reacting phosgene with trimethylamine.

Synthesis of dimethylcarbamoyl chloride with trimethylamine

A more recent process is based on chlorodimethylamine, which is converted practically quantitatively to dimethylcarbamoyl chloride on a palladium catalyst under pressure with carbon monoxide at room temperature.

Synthesis of dimethylcarbamoyl chloride from chloramine

DMCC can also be formed in small amounts (up to 20 ppm) from dimethylformamide (DMF) in the Vilsmeier–Haack reaction or when DMF is used as a catalyst in the reaction of carboxylic acids with thionyl chloride to the corresponding acyl chloride.

Synthesis of dimethylcarbamoyl chloride with dimethylformamide

The tendency towards DMCC formation depends on the chlorination reagent (thionyl chloride > oxalyl chloride > phosphorus oxychloride) and is higher in the presence of a base. However, dicarbamoyl chloride hydrolyses very quickly to dimethylamine, hydrochloric acid and carbon dioxide (with a half-life of about 6 minutes at 0 °C) so that less than 3 ppm of dicarbamoyl chloride is found in the Vilsmeier product after aqueous workup.

== Properties ==
Dimethylcarbamoyl chloride is a clear, colorless, corrosive and flammable liquid with a pungent odor and a tear-penetrating effect, which decomposes rapidly in water. Because of its unpleasant, toxic, mutagenic and carcinogenic properties, it has to be used under extreme precautions.

DMCC behaves like an acyl chloride whose chlorine atom can be exchanged for other nucleophiles. Therefore, it reacts with alcohols, phenols and oximes to the corresponding N,N-dimethylcarbamates, with thiols to thiolourethanes, with amines and hydroxylamines to substituted ureas, and with imidazoles and triazoles to carbamoylazoles.

Reactions of dimethylcarbamoyl chloride with nucleophiles

DMCC is less reactive and less selective to substrates with multiple nucleophilic centers than conventional acyl chlorides.

Unsaturated conjugated aldehydes such as crotonaldehyde (trans-but-2-enal) react with DMCC forming dienyl carbamates, which can be used as dienes in Diels–Alder reactions.

Synthesis of dienyl carbamates with dimethylcarbamoyl chloride

Alkali metal carboxylates react with DMCC forming the corresponding dimethylamides. DMCC reacts with anhydrous sodium carbonate or with excess dimethylamine to form tetramethylurea.

The reaction of DMCC with DMF forms tetramethylformamidinium chloride, which is a major intermediate in the preparation of tris(dimethylamino)methane, a reagent for the introduction of enamine functions in conjunction with activated methylene groups and the preparation of amidines.

Synthesis of tris(dimethylamino)methane with dimethylcarbamoyl chloride

DMCC is a starting material for the insecticide class of the dimethyl carbamates which act as inhibitors of acetylcholinesterase, including dimetilane, and the related compounds isolane, pirimicarb and triazamate.

Synthesis of dimetilane with dimethylcarbamoyl chloride

The quaternary ammonium compounds neostigmine finds pharmaceutical applications as acetylcholinesterase inhibitors. It is obtained from 3-(dimethylamino)phenol and DMCC and subsequent quaternization with methyl bromide or dimethyl sulfate

Synthesis of neostigmine with dimethylcarbamoyl chloride

and pyridostigmine, which is obtainable from 3-hydroxypyridine and DMCC and subsequent reaction with methyl bromide.

Synthesis of pyridostigmine with dimethylcarbamoyl chloride

DMCC is also used in the synthesis of the benzodiazepine camazepam.

Synthesis of camazepam with dimethylcarbamoyl chloride

== Applications ==
Dimethylcarbamoyl chloride has a role to play in phenylurea herbicides. Conceptually, it can be used in the following list of agents: Anisuron, Chloreturon, Chlorotoluron, Chloroxuron, DCMU, Difenoxuron, Dimefuron, Fenuron, Fluometuron, Fluothiuron, Isoproturon, Isouron, Karbutilate, Methiuron, Metoxuron, Monuron, Parafluron, Phenobenzuron, Tetrafluron, Trimefluor.

S-35836-1 (fig 6), meropenem pyrolan, bambuterol & ABT-299 are other known examples.

== See also ==
- Dimethylcarbamoyl fluoride
