= Tris(dimethylamino)methane =

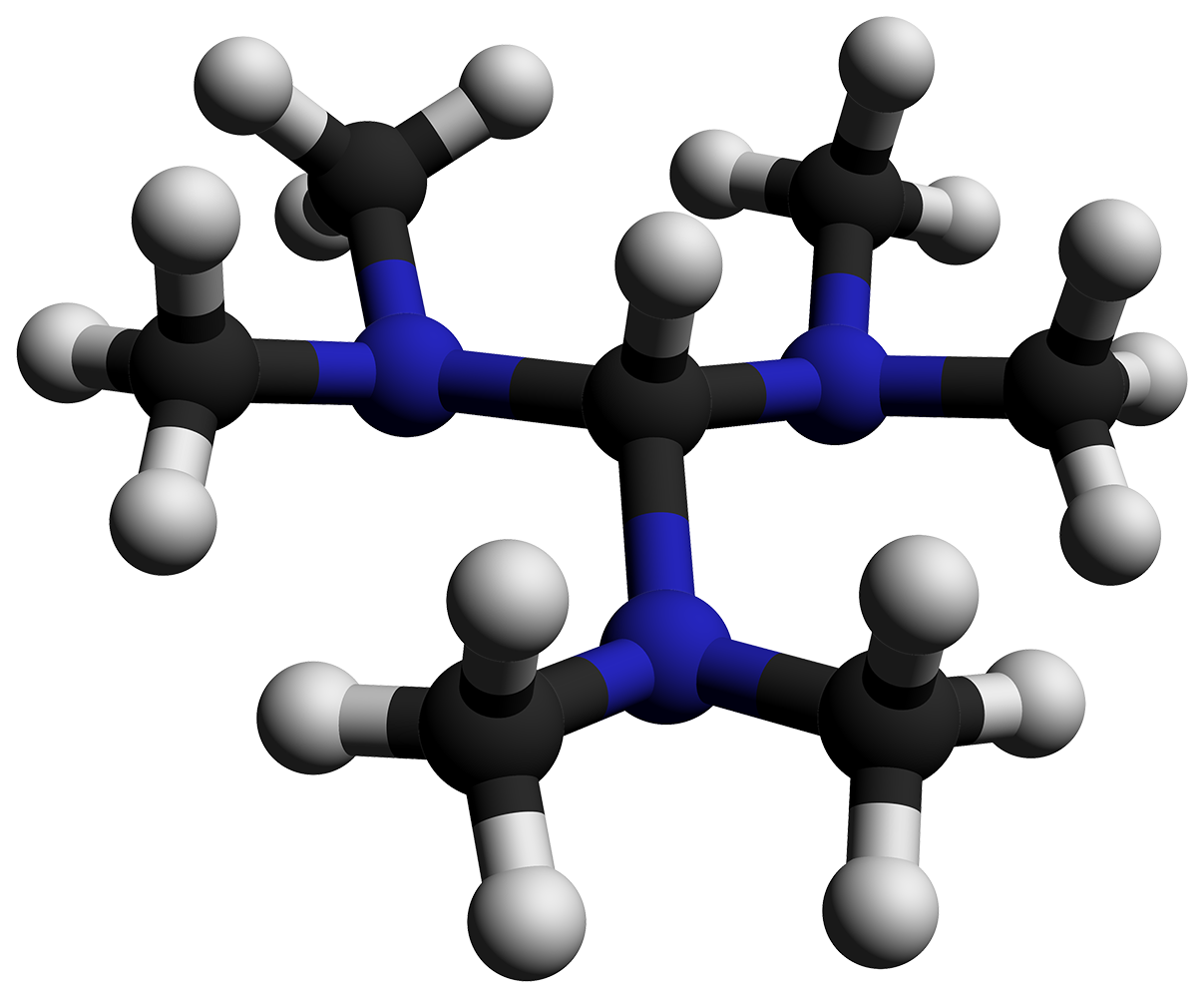

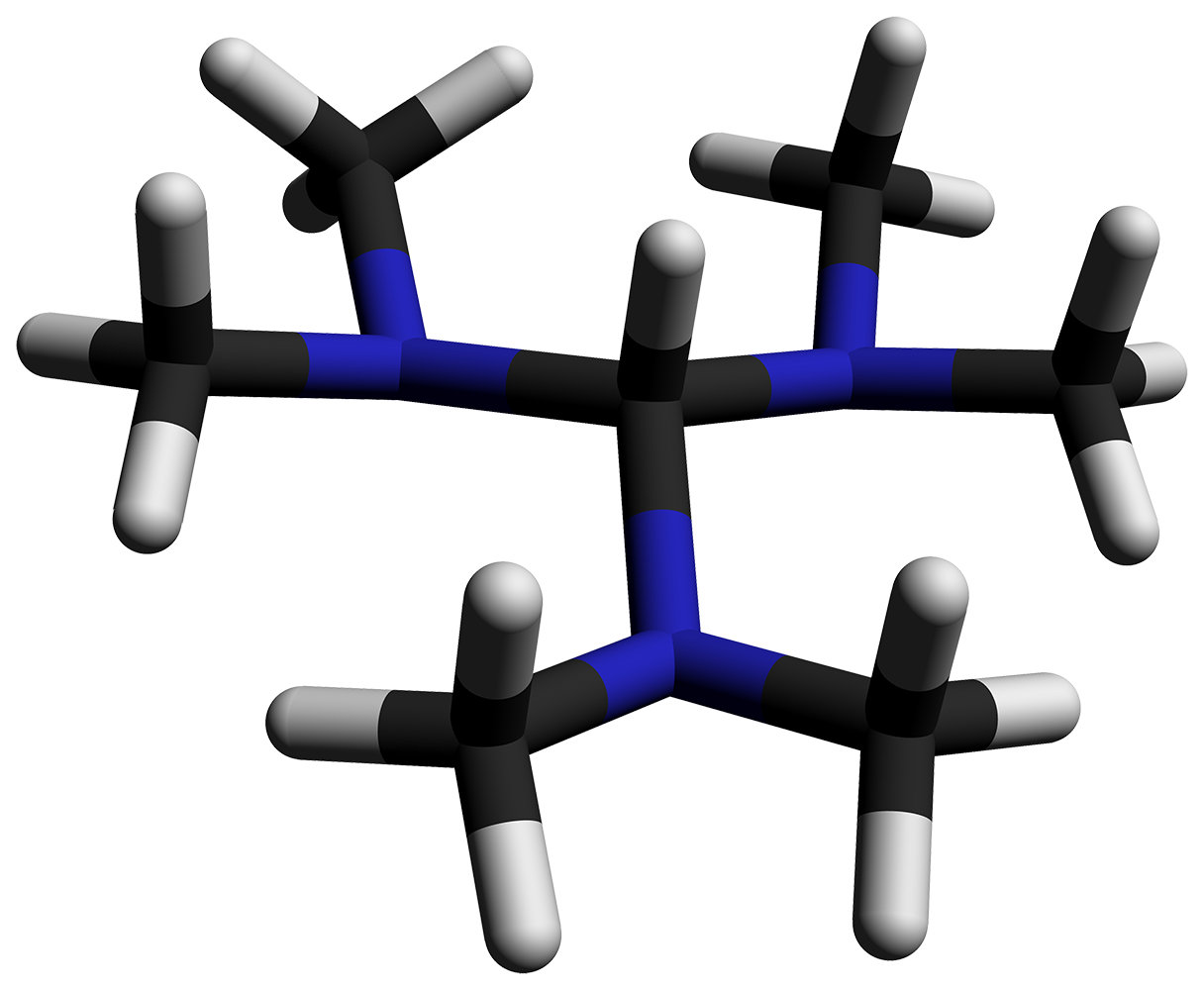

Names
- Preferred IUPAC name N,N,N′,N′,N′′,N′′-Hexamethylmethanetriamine
- Other names N,N,N,N,N,N-hexamethylmethanetriamine [bis(dimethylamino)methyl]dimethylamine

Identifiers
CAS Number	5762-56-1
3D model (JSmol)	Interactive image
ChEMBL	ChEMBL3301703
ChemSpider	72124
ECHA InfoCard	100.024.804
EC Number	227-284-0
PubChem CID	79831
UNII	8T74D2Q5VH
CompTox Dashboard (EPA)	DTXSID20206284
- InChI: InChI=1S/C7H19N3/c1-8(2)7(9(3)4)10(5)6/h7H,1-6H3 Key: MUMVIYLVHVCYGI-UHFFFAOYSA-N
- SMILES: CN(C)C(N(C)C)N(C)C

Properties
Chemical formula	C_{7}H_{19}N_{3}
Molar mass	145.250 g·mol^{−1}

Hazards
- GHS labelling
Pictograms	(GHS02: Flammable) (GHS05: Corrosive)
Signal word	Danger
Hazard statements	H225, H314
Precautionary statements	P210, P233, P240, P241, P242, P243, P260, P264, P280, P301+P330+P331, P302+P361+P354, P303+P361+P353, P304+P340, P305+P354+P338, P316, P321, P363, P370+P378, P403+P235, P405, P501
- Except where otherwise noted, data are given for materials in their standard state (at 25 °C [77 °F], 100 kPa). Infobox references

Tris(dimethylamino)methane (TDAM) is the simplest representative of the tris(dialkylamino)methanes of the general formula (R_{2}N)_{3}CH in which three of the four of methane's hydrogen atoms are replaced by dimethylamino groups (−N(CH_{3})_{2}). Tris(dimethylamino)methane can be regarded as both an amine and an orthoamide.

Tris(dimethylamino)methane is a strong base and can be used as a formylation agent, as aminomethylenation reagent and as a source for the basic bis(dimethylamino)carbene of the formula (R_{2}N)_{2}C:.

== Preparation ==
Tris(dimethylamino)methane is generally formed from dimethylaminating electron-rich formamide derivatives. For example, N,N,N′,N′-Tetramethylformamidinium chloride or bis(dimethylamino)acetonitrile react with dimethylamide salts to give TDAM:

Synthesis of TDAM from TMF-Cl and lithium dimethylamide

Likewise dimethylformamide (DMF) dimethylacetal, HC(OCH_{3})_{2}N(CH_{3})_{2}, reacts with dimethylamine in the presence of the acidic catalyst 2,4,6-tri-tert-butylphenol to give the same product:

Synthesis of TDAM from the dimethylacetal of DMF

TDAM can be produced directly from DMF with tetrakis(dimethylamino)titanium(IV):

Synthesis of TDAM from DMF with tetrakis(dimethylamino)titanium(IV)

Red-Al and other hydride reductants reduce hexamethylguanidinium chloride to TDAM:

Synthesis of TDAM from hexamethylguanidinium chloride

== Properties ==
Tris(dimethylamino)methane is a clear, colorless or pale yellow liquid with a strong ammoniacal odor. The compound is freely miscible with many non-polar aprotic and water-free solvents. However, when heated tris(dimethylamino)methane reacts with protic solvents (such as water or alcohols) but also with weak CH-acidic substances, such as acetone or acetonitrile.

Upon heating to 150–190 °C decomposition occurs to tetrakis(dimethylamino)ethylene, a strong electron donor.

Synthesis of tetrakis(dimethylamino)ethene

== Applications ==
Tris(dimethylamino)methane dissociates into N,N,N′,N′-tetramethylformamidinium cations and dimethylamide anions, which abstract protons from CH- and NH-acidic compounds. The anions thus formed add to the formamidinium cations which in turn eliminate dimethylamine and react to form dimethylaminomethylene compounds (= CH−N(CH_{3})_{2}) or amidines by aminomethyleneation.

Reaction to form a methyl α-cyano-β-dimethylaminoacrylate:

Synthesis of methyl α-cyano-β-dimethylaminoacrylate

Reaction to form N,N-dimethyl-N′-p-nitrophenylformamidine:

N,N-Dimethyl-N′-p-nitrophenylformamidine synthesis with TDAM

Aminomethylenation provides intermediates for the synthesis of heterocycles such as pyrimidines, pyrazoles, 1,4-dihydropyridines and indoles.

N,N,N′,N′-Tetramethylselenourea is accessible by the extended heating of tris(dimethylamino)methane with selenium in xylene; bis(dimethylamino)carbene is suggested as an intermediate.

Synthesis of tetramethylselenourea with TDAM

== Related reagent ==
- Bis(dimethylamino)methane
