= Tetrakis(dimethylamino)ethylene =

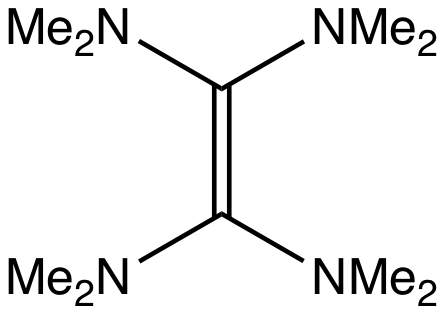

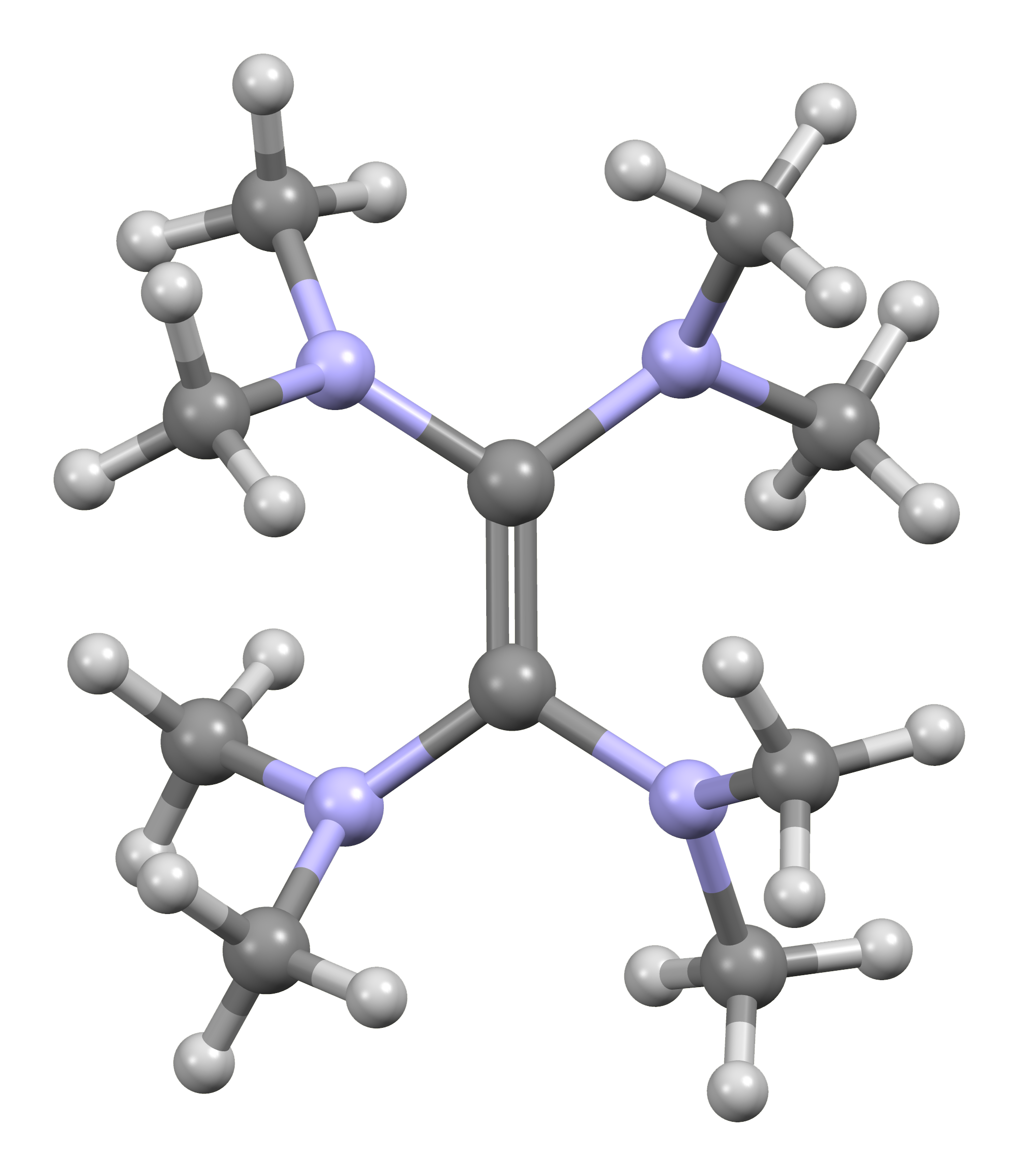

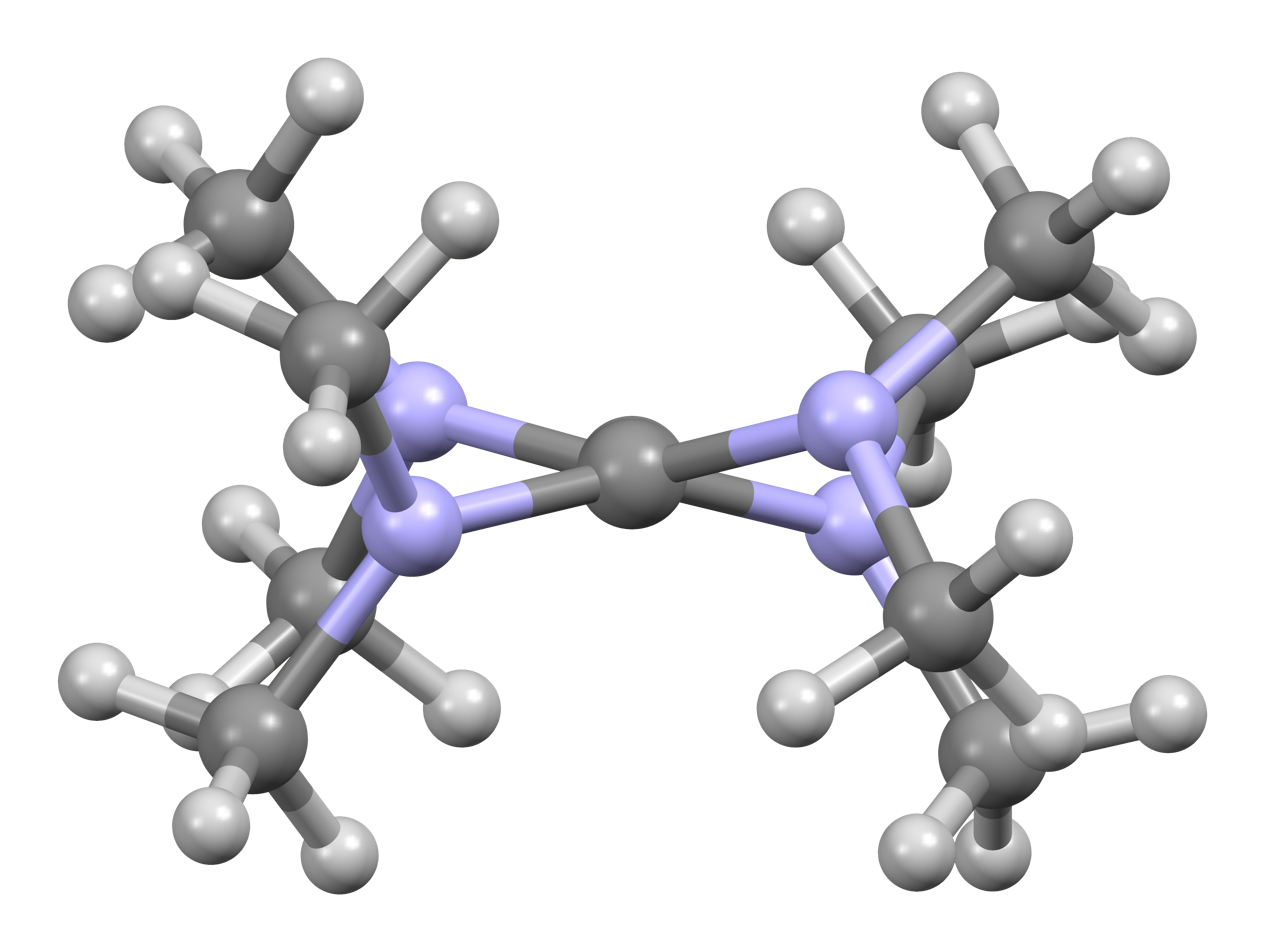

Names
- Preferred IUPAC name N^{1},N^{1},N′^{1},N′^{1},N^{2},N^{2},N′^{2},N′^{2}-Octamethylethene-1,1,2,2-tetramine
- Other names Octamethyl-ethenetetramine; TDAE

Identifiers
CAS Number	996-70-3
3D model (JSmol)	Interactive image
ChemSpider	63634
ECHA InfoCard	100.012.398
EC Number	213-638-1
PubChem CID	70455
UNII	P6737B68MN
CompTox Dashboard (EPA)	DTXSID0061371
- InChI: InChI=1S/C10H24N4/c1-11(2)9(12(3)4)10(13(5)6)14(7)8/h1-8H3 Key: CBXRMKZFYQISIV-UHFFFAOYSA-N
- SMILES: CN(C)C(=C(N(C)C)N(C)C)N(C)C

Properties
Chemical formula	C_{10}H_{24}N_{4}
Molar mass	200.330 g·mol^{−1}
Appearance	colorless liquid
Density	0.861 g/cm^{3} (25 °C)
Melting point	−4 °C (25 °F; 269 K)
Boiling point	59 °C (0.9 mm Hg)

Hazards
- GHS labelling
Pictograms	(GHS02: Flammable) (GHS05: Corrosive)
Signal word	Danger
Hazard statements	H226, H314
Precautionary statements	P210, P233, P240, P241, P242, P243, P260, P264, P280, P301+P330+P331, P303+P361+P353, P304+P340, P305+P351+P338, P310, P321, P363, P370+P378, P403+P235, P405, P501
Flash point	53 °C (127 °F; 326 K)
- Except where otherwise noted, data are given for materials in their standard state (at 25 °C [77 °F], 100 kPa). Infobox references

Tetrakis(dimethylamino)ethylene (TDAE) is an organic compound with the formula ((CH_{3})_{2}N)_{2}C=C(N(CH_{3})_{2})_{2}, It is a colorless liquid. It is classified as an enamine. Primary and secondary enamines tend to isomerize, but tertiary enamines are kinetically stable. One unusual feature of TDAE is that it is a tetra-enamine. The pi-donating tendency of the amine groups strongly enhances the basicity of the molecule, which does exhibit properties of a typical alkene.

== Reactions ==
TDAE reacts with oxygen in a chemiluminescent reaction to give tetramethylurea. The initial intermediate is (2+2) adduct, a 1,2-dioxetane. This species decomposes to electronically excited tetramethylurea. This returns to the ground state is accompanied by emission of green light with a maximum at 515 nm.

Oxidation of TDAE (chemiluminescence).

TDAE is an electron donor with E = 1.06 V vs Fc^{+/0}.

TDAE has been examined as a reductant in coupling reactions.

As one of many of examples of its redox behavior forms a charge-transfer salt with buckminsterfullerene:

C_{2}(N(CH_{3})_{2})_{4} + C_{60} → [C_{2}(N(CH_{3})_{2})_{4}^{+}][C_{60}^{−}]

Oxidation affords a dication.

== Structure ==
Crystallographic analysis show that TDAE is a highly distorted alkene, the dihedral angle for the two N2C ends is 28°. The C=C distance is alkene-like, 135 pm. The nearly isostructural tetraisopropylethylene also has a C=C distance of 135 pm, but its C6 core is planar. In contrast, [TDAE]^{2+} is an alkane with multi-C-N bonds.

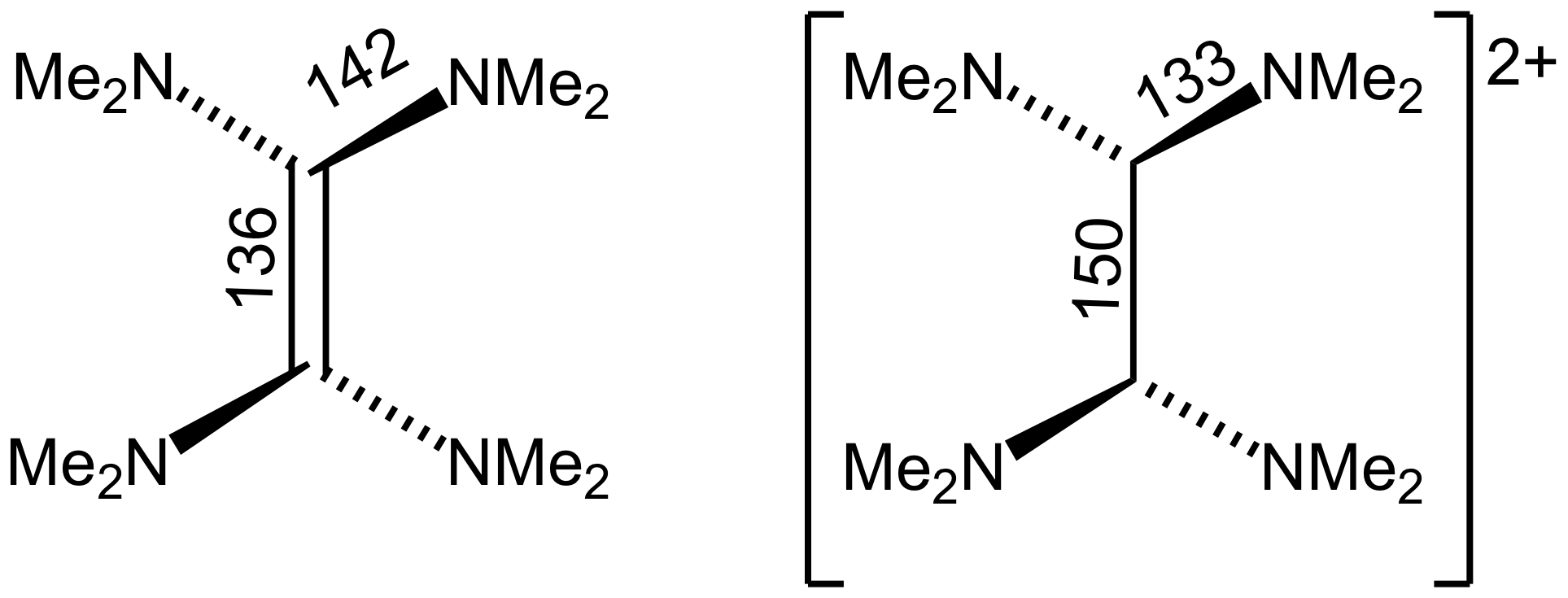
Structure of TDAE and its dication (distances in picometers).

== Synthesis ==
It is available by pyrolysis of tris(dimethylamino)methane or from chlorotrifluoroethene and dimethylamine.
