= Dienyl radical =

Organic chemical

Dienyl radicals are free radicals that can be formed by the oxidation of polyunsaturated fatty acids. These can combine with oxygen to form cis-trans lipid peroxyl radicals.

Benzene can be oxidized using a photocatalyst, QuCN+ to produce benzene radical cation. This benzene radical cation can produce a dienyl radical through nucleophilic reagent.
