= Aminal =

Type of organic compound or group

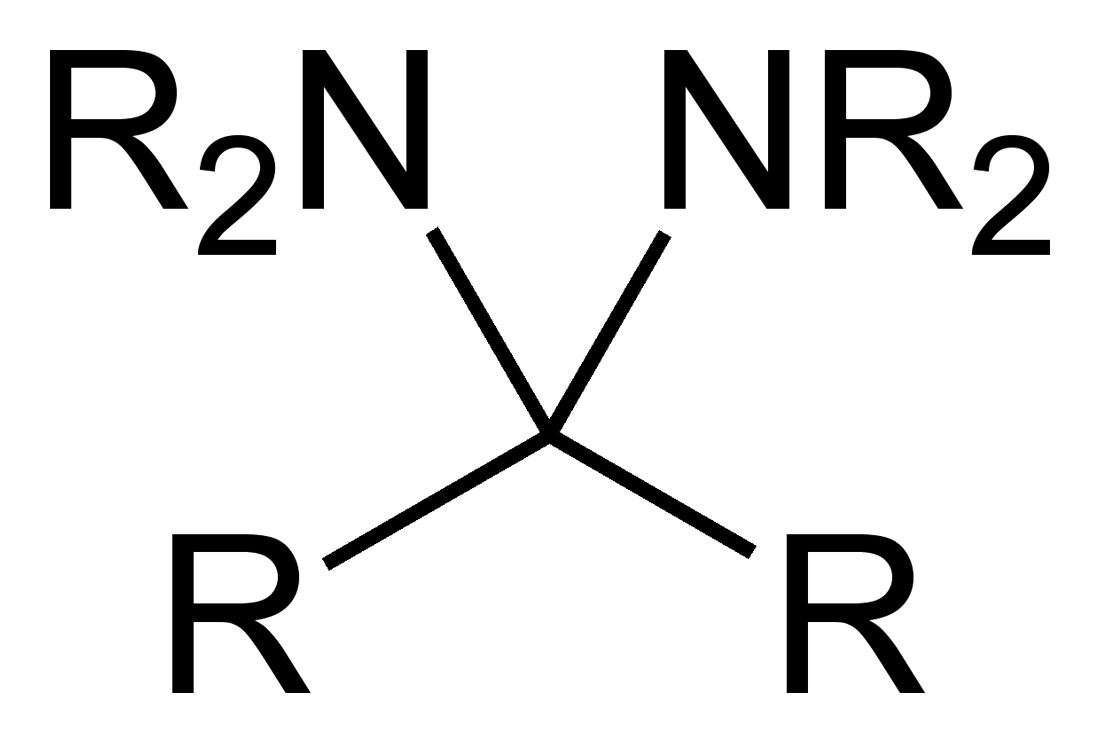
Generic aminal

In organic chemistry, an aminal or aminoacetal is a functional group or type of organic compound that has two amine groups attached to the same carbon atom: −C(NR_{2})(NR_{2})−. (As is customary in organic chemistry, R can represent hydrogen or an alkyl group). A common aminal is bis(dimethylamino)methane, a colorless liquid that is prepared by the reaction of dimethylamine and formaldehyde:

2 (CH_{3})_{2}NH + CH_{2}O → [(CH_{3})_{2}N]_{2}CH_{2} + H_{2}O

Aminals are encountered in, for instance, the Fischer indole synthesis. Several examples exist in nature.

Naturally occurring aminals

Physostigmine, a highly toxic cholinesterase inhibitor found in the Calabar bean.

Hodgkinsine, an alkaloid with antiviral, antibacterial and antifungal effects

5,10-Methylenetetrahydrofolate, an intermediate in one-carbon metabolism

Hexahydro-1,3,5-triazine ((CH_{2}NH)_{3}), an intermediate in the condensation of formaldehyde and ammonia, tends to degrade to hexamethylene tetraamine.

Cyclic aminals can be obtained by the condensation of a diamine and an aldehyde. Imidazolidines are one class of these cyclic aminals.

== See also ==
- Acetal
- Hemiaminal
