= Quinolone =

Quinolone may refer to:

- 2-Quinolone
- 4-Quinolone
- Quinolone antibiotics
