= Pigment Yellow 74 =

Names
- Other names Hansa Yellow 5GXB

Identifiers
CAS Number	6358-31-2
3D model (JSmol)	Interactive image
ChemSpider	21172327
ECHA InfoCard	100.026.153
EC Number	228-768-4
PubChem CID	22829
UNII	85338B499O
CompTox Dashboard (EPA)	DTXSID7025920
- InChI: InChI=1S/C18H18N4O6/c1-11(23)17(18(24)19-13-6-4-5-7-15(13)27-2)21-20-14-9-8-12(22(25)26)10-16(14)28-3/h4-10,17H,1-3H3,(H,19,24) Key: ZTISORAUJJGACZ-UHFFFAOYSA-N
- SMILES: N(=NC(C(NC1=C(OC)C=CC=C1)=O)C(C)=O)C2=C(OC)C=C(N(=O)=O)C=C2

Properties
Chemical formula	C_{18}H_{18}N_{4}O_{6}
Molar mass	386.364 g·mol^{−1}
Appearance	yellow powder
Density	1.436 g/cm^{3}
Melting point	290 °C (554 °F; 563 K) Decomposes
Solubility in water	7.6 µg/L
- Except where otherwise noted, data are given for materials in their standard state (at 25 °C [77 °F], 100 kPa). Infobox references

Pigment Yellow 74 (C.I. 11741) is an azo dye and classified as an arylide yellow. It is an intensely yellow-green solid.

== Extraction and presentation ==
Pigment Yellow 74 is prepared by azo coupling of diazotization 4-nitro-o-anisidine to 2-acetoacetanisidide.

== Properties ==
Pigment Yellow 74 is a flammable, hardly flammable, yellow solid that is practically insoluble in water. It decomposes when heated above > 290 °C. It has a triclinic crystal structure with the space group P1 or space group P-1 and the lattice parameters a = 16.06 ± 0.16 Å, b = 7.71 ± 0.08 Å, c = 14.977 ± 0.15 Å. The crystals of the compound are pleochroism. In polarized light, they exhibit an orange glow when the long axis of the crystals is perpendicular to the plane of polarization, as opposed to the case where the long axis of the crystals is parallel to the plane of polarization.

It is a flat molecule, enforced by the hydrogen-bonding via the ketohydrazide group.

== Use ==
Pigment Yellow 74 is used for printing inks and varnishs. The light fastness of fine-grained pigments of the compound is 2 to 3 fastness levels on the blue scale better than that of similar disazo yellow pigments, which is why these are preferably used when high light fastness is required, as is often the case in packaging printing. Similar to the other representatives of this pigment class, the solvent fastnesses are often less satisfactory. Prints with Yellow 74 pigment have poor calendering fastness and are not sterilizable. In contrast, like other monoazo yellow pigments, they are alkali-, acid- and soap-fast.

Pigment Yellow 74 is a popular component of artist's paints and tattoo inks.

== Regulation ==
Pigment Yellow 74 is regulated in the course of the CoRAP by Italy.

The use of Pigment Yellow 74 has been limited to 0.1% (1000 mg/kg) in permanent make-up or tattoo ink in the European Union since January 5, 2022.
