= Bis(dimethylamino)methane =

Names
- IUPAC name N,N,N′,N′-Tetramethylmethanediamine
- Other names N,N,N′,N′-Tetramethylmethylenediamine

Identifiers
CAS Number	51-80-9
3D model (JSmol)	Interactive image
ChemSpider	5624
ECHA InfoCard	100.000.114
EC Number	200-124-7
PubChem CID	5829
UNII	Z870I525KS
UN number	1993
CompTox Dashboard (EPA)	DTXSID1058761
- InChI: InChI=1S/C5H14N2/c1-6(2)5-7(3)4/h5H2,1-4H3 Key: VGIVLIHKENZQHQ-UHFFFAOYSA-N
- SMILES: CN(C)CN(C)C

Properties
Chemical formula	C_{5}H_{14}N_{2}
Molar mass	102.181 g·mol^{−1}
Appearance	colorless liquid
Density	0.749 g/cm^{3}
Melting point	−12 °C (10 °F; 261 K)
Boiling point	85 °C (185 °F; 358 K)

Hazards
- GHS labelling
Pictograms	(GHS02: Flammable) (GHS05: Corrosive)
Signal word	Danger
Hazard statements	H225, H314
Precautionary statements	P210, P233, P240, P241, P242, P243, P260, P264, P280, P301+P330+P331, P303+P361+P353, P304+P340, P305+P351+P338, P310, P321, P363, P370+P378, P403+P235, P405, P501
- Except where otherwise noted, data are given for materials in their standard state (at 25 °C [77 °F], 100 kPa). Infobox references

Bis(dimethylamino)methane is the organic compound with the formula [(CH_{3})_{2}N]_{2}CH_{2}. It is classified as an aminal as well as a ditertiary amine, in fact the simplest. It is a colorless liquid that is widely available. It is prepared by the reaction of dimethylamine and formaldehyde:

2 (CH_{3})_{2}NH + CH_{2}O → [(CH_{3})_{2}N]_{2}CH_{2} + H_{2}O

It is used for the dimethylaminomethylation reactions, the reaction being initiated by the addition of a strong, anhydrous acid:

[(CH_{3})_{2}N]_{2}CH_{2} + H^{+} → (CH_{3})_{2}NCH_{2}^{+} + (CH_{3})_{2}NH

Bis(dimethylamino)methane, being a Lewis base, functions as a bidentate ligand.

== Related reagents ==
- N,N,N′,N′-Tetramethylformamidinium chloride
- Eschenmoser's salt is used for similar applications.
