= 2-Quinolone =

Names
- Preferred IUPAC name Quinolin-2(1H)-one
- Other names: Carbostyril; 1,2-Dihydro-2-oxoquinoline; 1H-Quinolin-2-one

Identifiers
CAS Number	59-31-4
3D model (JSmol)	Interactive image
ChEBI	CHEBI:16365
ChEMBL	ChEMBLCHEMBL186422
ChemSpider	5816
ECHA InfoCard	100.000.382
EC Number	200-420-6
KEGG	C06338
PubChem CID	6038
UNII	803BHY7QWU
CompTox Dashboard (EPA)	DTXSID1058769
- InChI: InChI=1S/C9H7NO/c11-9-6-5-7-3-1-2-4-8(7)10-9/h1-6H,(H,10,11) Key: LISFMEBWQUVKPJ-UHFFFAOYSA-N
- SMILES: C1=CC=C2C(=C1)C=CC(=O)N2

Properties
Chemical formula	C_{9}H_{7}NO
Molar mass	145.161 g·mol^{−1}
Appearance	solid
Melting point	199.5 °C (391.1 °F; 472.6 K)
- Except where otherwise noted, data are given for materials in their standard state (at 25 °C [77 °F], 100 kPa). Infobox references

2-Quinolone is an organic compound related structurally to quinoline. It is the majority tautomer in equilibrium with 2-quinolinol. The compound can be classified as a cyclic amide, and as such is used as an isostere for peptides and other pharmaceutically inspired targets. The 4-methyl-2-quinolone can be prepared by dehydration of acetoacetanilide.

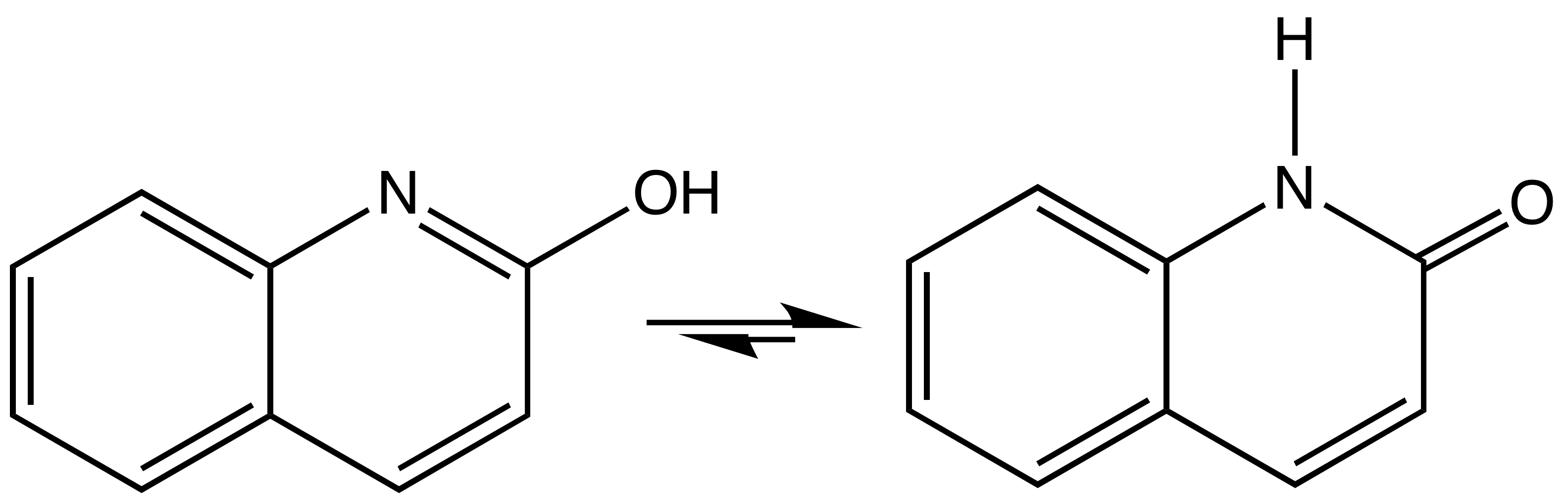
2-Quinolone (right) and its tautomer 2-hydroxyquinoline (left)

The isomer 4-quinolone is the parent of a large class of antibiotics called quinolone antibiotics. A prominent example is ciprofloxacin, a broad spectrum antibiotic commonly used for treatment of various infections such as urinary tract infections (UTIs), typhoid, meningitis, gonorrhoea, syphilis, and skin infections.
